= List of Scymnus species =

This is a list of 205 species in Scymnus, a genus of dusky lady beetles in the family Coccinellidae.

== Scymnus species ==
- Scymnus abbreviatus LeConte, 1852^{i c g}
- Scymnus abietis (Paykull, 1798)^{g}
- Scymnus alishanensis Pang & Yu, 1993^{g}
- Scymnus alpestris Mulsant & Rey, 1857^{g}
- Scymnus americanus Mulsant, 1850^{i c g b} (American scymnus lady beetle)
- Scymnus andrewsi Gordon, 2001
- Scymnus angusticollis Fauvel, 1903^{g}
- Scymnus apetzi Mulsant, 1846^{g}
- Scymnus apicanus J. Chapin, 1973^{i c g b} (apicanus lady beetle)
- Scymnus apiciflavus Motschulsky, 1858^{i c g}
- Scymnus apithanus Gordon, 1976^{i c g}
- Scymnus aquilonarius Gordon, 1976^{i c g}
- Scymnus araticus Iablokoff-Khnzorian, 1969^{g}
- Scymnus ardelio Horn, 1895^{i c g b}
- Scymnus aridoides Gordon, 1976^{i c g}
- Scymnus aridus Casey, 1899^{i c g}
- Scymnus ater Kugelann, 1794^{g}
- Scymnus auritus Thunberg, 1795^{g}
- Scymnus barberi Gordon, 1976^{i c g}
- Scymnus bennetti Gordon, 2001
- Scymnus bicolor (Germain, 1854)
- Scymnus bifurcatus Yu, 1995^{g}
- Scymnus binotulatus Boheman, 1859^{i c g}
- Scymnus bistortus Yu, 1995^{g}
- Scymnus bivulnerus Capra & Fürsch, 1967^{g}
- Scymnus brullei Mulsant, 1850^{i c g b} (Brullé's lady beetle)
- Scymnus bryanti Gordon, 1976^{i c g}
- Scymnus caffer Gordon, 1976^{i c g}
- Scymnus calabozoensis Gordon, 2001
- Scymnus calaveras Casey, 1893^{i c g b} (calaveras lady beetle)
- Scymnus canariensis Wollaston, 1864^{g}
- Scymnus caprai Canepari, 1983^{g}
- Scymnus carri Gordon, 1976^{i c g}
- Scymnus caudalis LeConte, 1850^{i c g b} (caudal lady beetle)
- Scymnus caurinus Horn, 1895^{i c g b} (northwestern lady beetle)
- Scymnus centralis Kamiya, 1965^{g}
- Scymnus cercyonoides Wollaston, 1864^{g}
- Scymnus cerinotum Gordon, 2001
- Scymnus cervicalis (Bate, 1888)^{i c g b}
- Scymnus circumspectus ^{i c g b}
- Scymnus citreus Gordon, 2001
- Scymnus cochereaui Bielawski, 1973^{g}
- Scymnus cockerelli Casey, 1899^{i c g}
- Scymnus compar (Anonymous [Bennett], 1830)^{i c g b}
- Scymnus coniferarum Abbot & Smith, 1797^{i c g b} (conifer lady beetle)
- Scymnus consobrinus LeConte, 1852^{i c g b} (consobrinous lady beetle)
- Scymnus constrictus Mulsant, 1850^{g}
- Scymnus contemptus Weise, 1923^{g}
- Scymnus coosi Hatch, 1961^{i c g}
- Scymnus creperus Mulsant, 1850^{i c g b}
- Scymnus curvus Yang, 1978^{g}
- Scymnus damryi Weise, 1879^{g}
- Scymnus demerarensis Gordon, 2001
- Scymnus diekei Gordon, 2001
- Scymnus difficilis L.^{i c g b}
- Scymnus dorcatomoides Weise, 1879^{i c g}
- Scymnus doriae Capra, 1924^{g}
- Scymnus doriai Capra, 1924^{g}
- Scymnus dozieri Gordon, 2001
- Scymnus elusivus Gordon, 1976^{i c g}
- Scymnus enochrus (Fabricius, 1792)^{i c g b}
- Scymnus epistemoides Wollaston, 1864^{g}
- Scymnus erythronotum Gordon, 1976^{i c g}
- Scymnus falli Mank, 1940^{i c g b} (Fall's lady beetle)
- Scymnus fanjingicus Ren & Pang, 1995^{g}
- Scymnus femoralis (Gyllenhal, 1827)^{g}
- Scymnus fenderi Malkin, 1943^{i c g}
- Scymnus fennicus J.Sahlberg, 1886^{g}
- Scymnus ferrugatus (Moll, 1785)^{g}
- Scymnus festatus Wingo, 1952^{i c g}
- Scymnus flagellisiphonatus (Fürsch, 1970)^{g}
- Scymnus flavescens Casey, 1899^{i c g}
- Scymnus flavicollis Redtenbacher, 1843^{g}
- Scymnus franzi Fursch & Kreissl, 1967^{g}
- Scymnus fraternus (Ortega) A. Delgado^{i c g b}
- Scymnus fraxini Mulsant, 1850^{g}
- Scymnus frontalis (Fabricius, 1787)^{g}
- Scymnus fryi Gordon, 2001
- Scymnus fulvicollis Mulsant, 1846^{g}
- Scymnus fuscatus Boheman, 1859^{g}
- Scymnus gachetensis Gordon, 2001
- Scymnus garlandicus Casey, 1899^{i c g b} (garland lady beetle)
- Scymnus gilae Casey, 1899^{i c g}
- Scymnus gnomus Gordon, 2001
- Scymnus grammicus Yu, 1995^{g}
- Scymnus haemorrhoidalis Herbst, 1797^{g}
- Scymnus hatomensis Kamiya, 1965^{g}
- Scymnus hesperius Gordon, 1976^{i c g}
- Scymnus hoffmanni Weise, 1879^{g}
- Scymnus hoocalis Pang & Gordon, 1986^{g}
- Scymnus horni Gorham, 1897^{i c g b}
- Scymnus howdeni Gordon, 1976^{i c g}
- Scymnus huachuca Gordon, 1976^{i c g}
- Scymnus hubbardi Gordon, 1976^{i c g}
- Scymnus humboldti Casey, 1899^{i c g}
- Scymnus ignarus Gordon, 1976^{i c g}
- Scymnus impexus Mulsant, 1850^{i c g b}
- Scymnus impletus Gordon, 1976^{i c g}
- Scymnus inderihensis Mulsant, 1850^{g}
- Scymnus indianensis Weise, 1929^{i c g b} (Indiana lady beetle)
- Scymnus insularis Boheman, 1859^{g}
- Scymnus interruptus (Goeze, 1777)^{g}
- Scymnus iowensis Casey, 1899^{i c g b} (Iowa lady beetle)
- Scymnus jacobianus Casey, 1899^{i c g}
- Scymnus jakowlewi Weise, 1892^{g}
- Scymnus kansanus Leconte, 1852^{i c g b} (Kansas lady beetle)
- Scymnus klapperichi Pang & Gordon, 1986^{g}
- Scymnus kraussi Gordon, 2001
- Scymnus lacustris A. Gray^{i c g b} (lacustrine lady beetle)
- Scymnus laetificus Weise, 1879^{g}
- Scymnus latemaculatus Motschulsky, 1858^{g}
- Scymnus leo Yang, 1978^{g}
- Scymnus levaillanti Mulsant, 1850^{i c g}
- Scymnus limbatus Stephens, 1832^{g}
- Scymnus limnichoides Wollaston, 1854^{g}
- Scymnus loewii Mulsant, 1850^{i c g b} (Loew's lady beetle)
- Scymnus louisianae Günther, 1870^{i c g b}
- Scymnus luctuosus Casey, 1899^{i c g}
- Scymnus luxorensis Fuersch, 1989^{g}
- Scymnus magnomaculatus Fürsch, 1958^{g}
- Scymnus majus Gordon, 1985^{i c g}
- Scymnus malleatus ^{g}
- Scymnus marginalis (Rossi, 1794)^{g}
- Scymnus marginicollis Mannerheim, 1843^{i c g b}
- Scymnus margipallens (Mulsant, 1850)^{i c g}
- Scymnus marinus (Mulsant, 1950)^{g}
- Scymnus martini Gordon, 1976^{i c g}
- Scymnus mediterraneus Iablokoff-Khnzorian, 1972^{g}
- Scymnus melanogaster Mulsant, 1853
- Scymnus menkei Gordon, 2001
- Scymnus mendocino Casey, 1899^{i c g}
- Scymnus mesasiaticus Savoyskaya, 1968^{g}
- Scymnus micros Fauvel, 1903^{g}
- Scymnus mimoides Gordon, 1976^{i c g}
- Scymnus mimulus Capra & Fürsch, 1967^{g}
- Scymnus monticola Casey, 1899^{i c g}
- Scymnus mormon Casey, 1899^{i c g}
- Scymnus muelleri Peneke, 1907^{g}
- Scymnus murilloi Gordon, 2001
- Scymnus napoensis Gordon, 2001
- Scymnus nebulosus (Linnaeus, 1758)^{i c g b} (nebulous lady beetle)
- Scymnus nemorivagus Wingo, 1952^{i c g}
- Scymnus neomexicanus Gordon, 1976^{i c g}
- Scymnus nevadensis Weise, 1929^{i c g b} (Nevada lady beetle)
- Scymnus nigricollis Gordon, 1976^{i c g}
- Scymnus nigrinus Kugelann, 1794^{g}
- Scymnus notescens (Blackburn, 1889)^{i c g}
- Scymnus novenus Yu, 1995^{g}
- Scymnus nubilus Mulsant, 1850^{g}
- Scymnus nugator Casey, 1899^{i c g}
- Scymnus nuttingi Gordon, 1976^{i c g}
- Scymnus ocellatus Sharp, 1885^{i c g}
- Scymnus oertzeni Weise, 1886^{g}
- Scymnus oestocraerus Pang & Huang, 1985^{g}
- Scymnus opaculus Horn, 1895^{i c g}
- Scymnus ovimaculatus Sasaji, 1968^{g}
- Scymnus pacificus Gilbert, 1890^{i c g b}
- Scymnus paganus Lewis, 1896^{g}
- Scymnus pallens LeConte, 1852^{i c g}
- Scymnus pallidulus Wollaston, 1867^{g}
- Scymnus pallipediformis Günther, 1958^{g}
- Scymnus pangi Fuersch, 1989^{g}
- Scymnus papago Casey, 1899^{i c g}
- Scymnus paprzyckii Gordon, 2001
- Scymnus paracanus J. Chapin, 1973^{i c g b}
- Scymnus parallelicus ^{g}
- Scymnus pauculus Gordon, 1976^{i c g}
- Scymnus pavesii Canepari, 1983^{g}
- Scymnus peninsularis Gordon, 1976^{i c g}
- Scymnus perdere Yang, 1978^{g}
- Scymnus pesenkoi Ukrainsky, 2008
- Scymnus petalinus Yu, 1995^{g}
- Scymnus pharaonis Motschulsky, 1851^{g}
- Scymnus phylloides Yu, 1995^{g}
- Scymnus pictilis Gordon, 2001
- Scymnus plutonus Mulsant, 1853^{g}
- Scymnus posticalis Sicard, 1912^{g}
- Scymnus postpictus Casey, 1899^{i c g}
- Scymnus postpinctus (Pullus) postpinctus Casey, 1899^{b} (fake-opaque ladybug)
- Scymnus pulvinatus Wingo, 1952^{i c g}
- Scymnus puncticollis LeConte, 1852^{i c g}
- Scymnus quadriguttatus Capra, 1924^{g}
- Scymnus quadrillum Motschulsky, 1858^{g}
- Scymnus quadrivittatus Mulsant, 1850^{i c g}
- Scymnus renoicus Casey, 1899^{i c g}
- Scymnus rhododendri Canepari, 1997^{g}
- Scymnus robustibasalis Yu, 2000^{g}
- Scymnus rohdendorfi Ukrainsky, 2008
- Scymnus rubicundus Erichson, 1847
- Scymnus rubricaudus Boddaert, 1783^{i c g b}
- Scymnus rubromaculatus (Goeze, 1777)^{g}
- Scymnus ruficeps (Ohta, 1929)^{g}
- Scymnus rufipes (Fabricius, 1798)^{g}
- Scymnus sacium (Roubal, 1927)^{g}
- Scymnus schmidti Fürsch, 1958^{g}
- Scymnus secula Yang, 1978^{g}
- Scymnus securus J. Chapin, 1973^{i c g b} (coastal scymnus lady)
- Scymnus semiruber (Linnaeus, 1758)^{i c g b}
- Scymnus shirozui Kamiya^{g}
- Scymnus silesiacus Weise, 1902^{g}
- Scymnus simillimus Gordon, 2001
- Scymnus simulans Gordon, 1976^{i c g}
- Scymnus smetanai Canepari, 1997^{g}
- Scymnus socer LeConte, 1852^{i c g b}
- Scymnus sodalis Weise, 1923^{g}
- Scymnus solidus Casey, 1899^{i c g}
- Scymnus spanglerorum Gordon, 2001
- Scymnus splendidulus Stenius, 1952^{g}
- Scymnus subvillosus (Goeze, 1777)^{i c g}
- Scymnus suffrianioides J.Sahlberg, 1913^{g}
- Scymnus suturalis (Linnaeus, 1758)^{i c g b}
- Scymnus syriacus Marseul, 1868^{g}
- Scymnus tahoensis Casey, 1899^{i c g}
- Scymnus takasago Kamiya^{g}
- Scymnus tenebricus Gordon, 1976^{i c g}
- Scymnus tenebrosus Gilbert, 1892^{i c g b}
- Scymnus tenuis Yang, 1978^{g}
- Scymnus tiaboensis Gordon, 2001
- Scymnus trulla Gordon, 2001
- Scymnus uncinatus Sicard, 1924^{i c g}
- Scymnus uncus Wingo, 1952^{i c g b}
- Scymnus unicolor Montrouzier^{g}
- Scymnus utahensis Gordon, 1976^{i c g}
- Scymnus uteanus Casey, 1899^{i c g}
- Scymnus varipes Blackburn, 1896^{i c g}
- Scymnus vilis Weise, 1923^{g}
- Scymnus vividus Sharp, 1885^{i c g}
- Scymnus weidti Casey, 1899^{i c g}
- Scymnus wickhami Gordon, 1976^{i c g}
- Scymnus wingoi Gordon, 1976^{i c g}
- Scymnus yangi Yu & Pang, 1993^{g}
- Scymnus yemenensis Kapur, 1959^{g}

Data sources: i = ITIS, c = Catalogue of Life, g = GBIF, b = Bugguide.net
