= Pullus (beetle) =

Scientific classification
- Kingdom: Animalia
- Phylum: Arthropoda
- Class: Insecta
- Order: Coleoptera
- Suborder: Polyphaga
- Infraorder: Cucujiformia
- Family: Coccinellidae
- Genus: Scymnus
- Subgenus: Pullus; Mulsant, 1846

Genus of beetles

Pullus is a subgenus of beetle in the family Coccinellidae.

== Species ==
=== A ===
Scymnus abbreviatus - Scymnus accamptus - Scymnus acerosus - Scymnus acutiumerosus - Scymnus adustus - Scymnus aemulus - Scymnus agnatus - Scymnus agnavus - Scymnus agrumi - Scymnus alienus - Scymnus alluaudi - Scymnus alocasia - Scymnus ambonoidea - Scymnus amphiparpicus - Scymnus ampuliformis - Scymnus ancontophyllus - Scymnus ancylophyllus - Scymnus andrewsi - Scymnus apicalis - Scymnus apicesignatus - Scymnus apithanus - Scymnus apophysatus - Scymnus aquilonarius - Scymnus arabicus - Scymnus ardelio - Scymnus argutus - Scymnus aridoides - Scymnus aridus - Scymnus arrowi - Scymnus asper - Scymnus assamensis - Scymnus auritoides - Scymnus auritulus - Scymnus auritus

=== B ===
Scymnus baoxingensis - Scymnus barbatus - Scymnus barberi - Scymnus bawanglingicus - Scymnus bengalicus - Scymnus bennetti - Scymnus besucheti - Scymnus bhaumiki - Scymnus biplagiatus - Scymnus biroi - Scymnus bispinosus - Scymnus bistortus - Scymnus bourdilloni - Scymnus brullei - Scymnus bryanti - Scymnus bulangicus

=== C ===
Scymnus caffer - Scymnus calabozoensis - Scymnus calaveras - Scymnus canariensis - Scymnus capeneri - Scymnus cardi - Scymnus carri - Scymnus casstroemi - Scymnus castaneus - Scymnus cataparpicus - Scymnus caudalis - Scymnus caudatus - Scymnus centralis - Scymnus centrorubicus - Scymnus centrorufovillosus - Scymnus cerinotum - Scymnus cervicalis - Scymnus ceylonicus - Scymnus chatchas - Scymnus chayuensis - Scymnus chelyospilicus - Scymnus chujoi - Scymnus cibagouensis - Scymnus ciliosus - Scymnus cirroticus - Scymnus citreus - Scymnus cladocerus - Scymnus clavareaui - Scymnus cnidatus - Scymnus coccivora - Scymnus cockerelli - Scymnus compar - Scymnus comperei - Scymnus compoceratus - Scymnus coniferarum - Scymnus conoidalis - Scymnus consobrinus - Scymnus contemtus - Scymnus corallinus - Scymnus corporosus - Scymnus crassus - Scymnus creperus - Scymnus cristiformis - Scymnus cryphaconicus - Scymnus curvus - Scymnus cuspidiger - Scymnus cyanescens - Scymnus cyclotus - Scymnus cypholobicus

=== D ===
Scymnus dactylicus - Scymnus dasyphyllus - Scymnus decellei - Scymnus demerarensis - Scymnus derelictus - Scymnus despectus - Scymnus devexus - Scymnus deyrollii - Scymnus dichorionicus - Scymnus dicorycus - Scymnus diekei - Scymnus dimidius - Scymnus dipetalus - Scymnus dolichocystoides - Scymnus dongjiuensis - Scymnus dorcatomoides - Scymnus dozieri - Scymnus dubitabilis - Scymnus dyadechkoi

=== E ===
Scymnus ebeninus - Scymnus ebneri - Scymnus elegans - Scymnus elusivus - Scymnus eminulus - Scymnus enochrus - Scymnus ensatus - Scymnus epimecis - Scymnus erwini - Scymnus erythrinus - Scymnus erythronotum - Scymnus exilis - Scymnus exocorycus - Scymnus exodontoides - Scymnus ezhanus

=== F ===
Scymnus facetus - Scymnus falli - Scymnus fanjingicus - Scymnus fastigiatus - Scymnus ferrugatus - Scymnus festatus - Scymnus filippovi - Scymnus flavescens - Scymnus flavipubens - Scymnus floralis - Scymnus formicarius - Scymnus formosanus - Scymnus fraternus - Scymnus fraxini - Scymnus freyi - Scymnus fruticis - Scymnus fryi - Scymnus fujianensis - Scymnus fumosipennis - Scymnus fuscus

=== G ===
Scymnus gachetensis - Scymnus garlandicus - Scymnus geminus - Scymnus giganteus - Scymnus gilae - Scymnus gnavoides - Scymnus gnavus - Scymnus gnomus - Scymnus godavariensis - Scymnus gracilis - Scymnus gratiosus - Scymnus gucheng - Scymnus guttigera

=== H ===
Scymnus hadongensis - Scymnus haemorrhous - Scymnus hainanicus - Scymnus hanmianus - Scymnus harejoides - Scymnus hatomensis - Scymnus hepaticus - Scymnus heptaspilicus - Scymnus hesperius - Scymnus heyuanus - Scymnus hilaris - Scymnus hingstoni - Scymnus hirsutus - Scymnus hiulcus - Scymnus horni - Scymnus howdeni - Scymnus huachuca - Scymnus huashansong - Scymnus hubbardi - Scymnus humboldti

=== I ===
Scymnus ictericus - Scymnus ignarus - Scymnus igneus - Scymnus impexus - Scymnus impiger - Scymnus impletus - Scymnus inclinatus - Scymnus innocuus - Scymnus integer - Scymnus iowensis

=== J ===
Scymnus jacobianus - Scymnus jaculatorius - Scymnus janetscheki - Scymnus japonicus - Scymnus jigongshan - Scymnus jingdongensis

=== K ===
Scymnus kabakovi - Scymnus kaguyahime - Scymnus kansanus - Scymnus kaszabianus - Scymnus kawamurai - Scymnus kimotoi - Scymnus kiotoensis - Scymnus klinosiphonicus - Scymnus koebelei - Scymnus kopetzi - Scymnus kosianus - Scymnus kraussi

=== L ===
Scymnus lacustris - Scymnus lagosinus - Scymnus latemaculatus - Scymnus latifolius - Scymnus latus - Scymnus lautus - Scymnus lebuensis - Scymnus leo - Scymnus leptophyllus - Scymnus linanicus - Scymnus linnei - Scymnus linzhianus - Scymnus liupanshanus - Scymnus loewii - Scymnus lonchiatus - Scymnus longicuspis - Scymnus longisiphonatus - Scymnus louisianae - Scymnus loxiphyllus - Scymnus lucicolus - Scymnus luctuosus - Scymnus luridus - Scymnus luxorensis

=== M ===
Scymnus majeri - Scymnus majus - Scymnus majusculus - Scymnus maoershanensis - Scymnus marginicollis - Scymnus margipallens - Scymnus marshalli - Scymnus martensi - Scymnus martini - Scymnus mastigoides - Scymnus mauritiusi - Scymnus medanensis - Scymnus meghalayae - Scymnus meicystoides - Scymnus melanogaster - Scymnus mellinus - Scymnus mendocino - Scymnus menglensis - Scymnus menglianicus - Scymnus mengshanus - Scymnus menkei - Scymnus mexicanus - Scymnus mimoides - Scymnus miyatakei - Scymnus monachus - Scymnus mongolicus - Scymnus monticola - Scymnus mormon - Scymnus motuoensis - Scymnus multisetosus - Scymnus murilloi - Scymnus musculus

=== N ===
Scymnus nankunicus - Scymnus napoensis - Scymnus nasti - Scymnus nemorivagus - Scymnus neomexicanus - Scymnus nepalensis - Scymnus nephrospilus - Scymnus nevadensis - Scymnus nielamuensis - Scymnus nigricollis - Scymnus nigripes - Scymnus nigrobasalis - Scymnus nigropectus - Scymnus nigrosellatus - Scymnus nobilis - Scymnus nossibeanus - Scymnus novenus - Scymnus nugator - Scymnus nuttingi - Scymnus nymphaeus

=== O ===
Scymnus obliquophyllus - Scymnus oblongoides - Scymnus oblongulus - Scymnus oblongus - Scymnus oculoformis - Scymnus oertzeni - Scymnus oestocraerus - Scymnus onagus - Scymnus oncosiphonos - Scymnus o-nigrum - Scymnus opimus - Scymnus orientalis - Scymnus osakaensis - Scymnus ovimaculatus

=== P ===
Scymnus pacificus - Scymnus pailongensis - Scymnus paleaceus - Scymnus pallens - Scymnus papago - Scymnus paprzyckii - Scymnus paraccamptus - Scymnus paraexilis - Scymnus paraperdere - Scymnus paratenuis - Scymnus parautilis - Scymnus pauculus - Scymnus pelecoides - Scymnus penicilliformis - Scymnus peninsularis - Scymnus perdere - Scymnus pesenkoi - Scymnus petalinus - Scymnus phloeus - Scymnus phylloides - Scymnus pictilis - Scymnus pilatii - Scymnus pingbianensis - Scymnus pleikuensis - Scymnus plutonus - Scymnus podoides - Scymnus porcatus - Scymnus posticalis - Scymnus postmacularis - Scymnus postpictus - Scymnus praecisus - Scymnus pretoriensis - Scymnus profusus - Scymnus prolatus - Scymnus propiptoides - Scymnus prostylotus - Scymnus pseudoblongus - Scymnus puellaris - Scymnus pulvinatus - Scymnus puncticollis - Scymnus pupulus - Scymnus pyrocheilus - Scymnus pyrrhocephalus

=== Q ===
Scymnus quadratimaculatus - Scymnus quadrivittatus - Scymnus quisquilius

=== R ===
Scymnus rajeshwariae - Scymnus rectangulus - Scymnus rectiusculus - Scymnus rectoides - Scymnus rectus - Scymnus renoicus - Scymnus rhachiatus - Scymnus rhamphiatus - Scymnus rhinoides - Scymnus rhombicus - Scymnus rohdendorfi - Scymnus rosenhaueri - Scymnus rubicundus - Scymnus rubricauda - Scymnus ruficeps - Scymnus rufomaculatus - Scymnus rufoniger - Scymnus rufosellatus - Scymnus rufostriatus - Scymnus rufus - Scymnus runcatus - Scymnus rwandensis

=== S ===
Scymnus saciformis - Scymnus salomonis - Scymnus sapporensis - Scymnus scalpratus - Scymnus schawalleri - Scymnus schoutedeni - Scymnus scrobiculatus - Scymnus securus - Scymnus selliformis - Scymnus seminiger - Scymnus semiruber - Scymnus separatus - Scymnus severus - Scymnus shirozui - Scymnus shixingicus - Scymnus silesiacus - Scymnus simillimus - Scymnus simulans - Scymnus singularis - Scymnus siphonofissus - Scymnus smithianus - Scymnus socer - Scymnus sodalis - Scymnus solidus - Scymnus spanglerorum - Scymnus sphenophyllus - Scymnus spicatus - Scymnus spirellus - Scymnus spirosiphonicus - Scymnus straeleni - Scymnus subvillosus - Scymnus sufflavoides - Scymnus suturalis - Scymnus suturaloides - Scymnus syoitii - Scymnus syriacus

=== T ===
Scymnus tahoensis - Scymnus takabayashii - Scymnus takaraensis - Scymnus takasago - Scymnus tenebricus - Scymnus tenebrosus - Scymnus tenuis - Scymnus testacecollis - Scymnus thelys - Scymnus thiolieri - Scymnus tiaboensis - Scymnus tibialis - Scymnus toxosiphonius - Scymnus trimaculatus - Scymnus tropicus - Scymnus trukensis - Scymnus trulla - Scymnus truncatus - Scymnus tschungi - Scymnus tympanus

=== U ===
Scymnus uncinatus - Scymnus uncinus - Scymnus uncus - Scymnus uninotatus - Scymnus urgensis - Scymnus ursulus - Scymnus usambaricus - Scymnus utahensis - Scymnus uteanus

=== V ===
Scymnus vencoxus - Scymnus ventricosus - Scymnus victoris - Scymnus vilis - Scymnus villiersi - Scymnus vinhphuensis - Scymnus vittipennis

=== W ===
Scymnus weidti - Scymnus weigeli - Scymnus wickhami - Scymnus wingoi - Scymnus wudangensis

=== X ===
Scymnus xanthostethus - Scymnus xerampelinus - Scymnus xiaoweishanus - Scymnus xujiabensis

=== Y ===
Scymnus yaling - Scymnus yanlingicus - Scymnus yaoquensis - Scymnus yarangicus - Scymnus yarlungzangbo - Scymnus yemenensis - Scymnus yunshanpingensis

=== Z ===
Scymnus zhidkovi - Scymnus zischkai - Scymnus zonatus - Scymnus zuritai
