= Scymnus (subgenus) =

Scientific classification
- Kingdom: Animalia
- Phylum: Arthropoda
- Class: Insecta
- Order: Coleoptera
- Suborder: Polyphaga
- Infraorder: Cucujiformia
- Family: Coccinellidae
- Genus: Scymnus
- Subgenus: Scymnus; Yang, 1978

Genus of beetles

Scymnus is a subgenus of beetle in the family Coccinellidae.

== Species ==
Scymnus acerbus - Scymnus albopilis - Scymnus americanus - Scymnus andrewesi - Scymnus apetzii - Scymnus apicanus - Scymnus apiciflavus - Scymnus arciformis - Scymnus ardosiacus - Scymnus assimilis - Scymnus axinoides - Scymnus ayaguzicus - Scymnus basinigrinus - Scymnus biconvexus - Scymnus bifurcatus - Scymnus bivulnerus - Scymnus bogdoensis - Scymnus byssinus - Scymnus caiyanghensis - Scymnus capicola - Scymnus caurinus - Scymnus cedricolus - Scymnus choui - Scymnus circumspectus - Scymnus claripes - Scymnus clavellatus - Scymnus c-luteum - Scymnus cochereaui - Scymnus comosus - Scymnus concinnus - Scymnus contortubus - Scymnus crinitus - Scymnus cyclicus - Scymnus damryi - Scymnus danielssoni - Scymnus decemmaculatus - Scymnus declaratus - Scymnus deflexus - Scymnus deltatus - Scymnus demeteri - Scymnus dipterygicus - Scymnus dissolobus - Scymnus dolichonychus - Scymnus doriae - Scymnus dorotae - Scymnus elagatisophyllus - Scymnus experientius - Scymnus externenigrum - Scymnus extumidus - Scymnus fallaciosus - Scymnus fallax - Scymnus fasciculatus - Scymnus femoralis - Scymnus fenderi - Scymnus flavicollis - Scymnus folchinii - Scymnus franzi - Scymnus frontalis - Scymnus fusinus - Scymnus ghesquierei - Scymnus gonatoides - Scymnus grammicus - Scymnus guniujiangicus - Scymnus hodeki - Scymnus icteratus - Scymnus impolitus - Scymnus inderihensis - Scymnus indianensis - Scymnus indicus - Scymnus interruptus - Scymnus jakowlewi - Scymnus kibaliensis - Scymnus kibonotensis - Scymnus laetificus - Scymnus leigongicus - Scymnus lepidulus - Scymnus longmenicus - Scymnus luxiensis - Scymnus magnomaculatus - Scymnus makuensis - Scymnus manipulus - Scymnus marginalis - Scymnus marinellus - Scymnus mediobimaculatus - Scymnus medioovatus - Scymnus mesasiaticus - Scymnus miyamotoi - Scymnus monroviae - Scymnus morelleti - Scymnus morosus - Scymnus nabangicus - Scymnus najaformis - Scymnus nandianus - Scymnus nigerianus - Scymnus nigrinus - Scymnus notidanus - Scymnus nubilus - Scymnus nummelini - Scymnus obesus - Scymnus opaculus - Scymnus paganus - Scymnus pallipes - Scymnus paracanus - Scymnus paracrinitus - Scymnus patruelis - Scymnus pavesii - Scymnus pingqianensis - Scymnus pinguis - Scymnus plautus - Scymnus plebejus - Scymnus pruinosus - Scymnus recavus - Scymnus rubromaculatus - Scymnus rufipennis - Scymnus rufipes - Scymnus sangtanabiensis - Scymnus scapanulus - Scymnus scapuliferus - Scymnus schmidti - Scymnus seminigrinus - Scymnus serratus - Scymnus signatipectus - Scymnus sufflavus - Scymnus suffrianioides - Scymnus tegminalis - Scymnus trachypus - Scymnus tristigmaticus - Scymnus trisulicus - Scymnus tsushimaensis - Scymnus unciformis - Scymnus vecors - Scymnus venalis - Scymnus viduus - Scymnus xiongfeii - Scymnus yotsuhoshi - Scymnus zhangmuensis
