= Parapullus =

Scientific classification
- Kingdom: Animalia
- Phylum: Arthropoda
- Class: Insecta
- Order: Coleoptera
- Suborder: Polyphaga
- Infraorder: Cucujiformia
- Family: Coccinellidae
- Genus: Scymnus
- Subgenus: Parapullus; Yang, 1978

Genus of beetles

Parapullus is a subgenus of beetle in the family Coccinellidae.

== Species ==
- Scymnus abietis
- Scymnus aduncatus
- Scymnus alishanensis
- Scymnus annuliformis
- Scymnus baxianshanensis
- Scymnus coosi
- Scymnus dichotomus
- Scymnus difficilis
- Scymnus hastatus
- Scymnus laojielingensis
- Scymnus malleatus
- Scymnus nanlingicus
- Scymnus nebulosus
- Scymnus papillatus
- Scymnus parallelicus
- Scymnus secula
- Scymnus shenmuensis
- Scymnus solus
- Scymnus tsugae
- Scymnus yanzigouensis
