= Scymnus fujianensis =

Scientific classification
- Kingdom: Animalia
- Phylum: Arthropoda
- Clade: Pancrustacea
- Class: Insecta
- Order: Coleoptera
- Suborder: Polyphaga
- Infraorder: Cucujiformia
- Family: Coccinellidae
- Genus: Scymnus
- Species: S. fujianensis

Binomial name
- Scymnus fujianensis Pang & Gordon, 1986

Species of beetle

Scymnus fujianensis is a species of beetle of the family Coccinellidae. It is found in China (Fujian).

== Description ==
Adults reach a length of about 2 mm. They have a yellow head and pronotum. The elytron is black, although the apical one-fourth is yellow.
