= Scymnus longulum =

Scientific classification
- Kingdom: Animalia
- Phylum: Arthropoda
- Clade: Pancrustacea
- Class: Insecta
- Order: Coleoptera
- Suborder: Polyphaga
- Infraorder: Cucujiformia
- Family: Coccinellidae
- Genus: Scymnus
- Species: S. longulum

Binomial name
- Scymnus longulum Casey, 1899

Synonyms
- Scymnus longulus; Didion longulus; Didion longulum; Didion parviceps Casey, 1899; Scymnus (Pullus) occiduus Casey, 1899

Species of beetle

Scymnus longulum is a species of dusky lady beetle in the family Coccinellidae. It is found in North America, where it has been recorded from Alberta to British Columbia, south to California.

== Description ==
Adults reach a length of about 1.38-1.75 mm. They have a black or piceous body.
