= Scymnus nanum =

Scientific classification
- Kingdom: Animalia
- Phylum: Arthropoda
- Clade: Pancrustacea
- Class: Insecta
- Order: Coleoptera
- Suborder: Polyphaga
- Infraorder: Cucujiformia
- Family: Coccinellidae
- Genus: Scymnus
- Species: S. nanum

Binomial name
- Scymnus nanum LeConte, 1852

Synonyms
- Scymnus nanus; Didion nanum; Didion nana

Species of beetle

Scymnus nanum is a species of beetle of the family Coccinellidae. It is found in North America, where it has been recorded from Ontario, Iowa, Illinois, Kansas, Massachusetts and Pennsylvania.

== Description ==
Adults reach a length of about 1.50–1.80 mm. They have a black body, while the anterolateral angle of the pronotum, mouthparts and legs are dark reddish brown.
