= Scymnus fuscatus =

Scientific classification
- Kingdom: Animalia
- Phylum: Arthropoda
- Clade: Pancrustacea
- Class: Insecta
- Order: Coleoptera
- Suborder: Polyphaga
- Infraorder: Cucujiformia
- Family: Coccinellidae
- Genus: Scymnus
- Species: S. fuscatus

Binomial name
- Scymnus fuscatus Boheman, 1859

Species of beetle

Scymnus (Neopullus) fuscatus, is a species of lady beetle found in Japan, Formosa, China, Philippines, Sunda Islands, India, Sri Lanka, Nepal and Australia.
