= Scymnus comperei =

Scientific classification
- Kingdom: Animalia
- Phylum: Arthropoda
- Clade: Pancrustacea
- Class: Insecta
- Order: Coleoptera
- Suborder: Polyphaga
- Infraorder: Cucujiformia
- Family: Coccinellidae
- Genus: Scymnus
- Species: S. comperei

Binomial name
- Scymnus comperei Pang & Gordon, 1986

Species of beetle

Scymnus comperei is a species of beetle of the family Coccinellidae. It is found in China (Guangdong).

== Description ==
Adults reach a length of about 1.9–2 mm. They have a yellow head and yellowish brown pronotum. The elytron is reddish brown with the apical one-sixth yellow.
