= Scymnus folchinii =

Scientific classification
- Kingdom: Animalia
- Phylum: Arthropoda
- Clade: Pancrustacea
- Class: Insecta
- Order: Coleoptera
- Suborder: Polyphaga
- Infraorder: Cucujiformia
- Family: Coccinellidae
- Genus: Scymnus
- Species: S. folchinii

Binomial name
- Scymnus folchinii Canepari, 1979

Synonyms
- Scymnus (Scymnus) hainanensis Pang & Gordon, 1986

Species of beetle

Scymnus folchinii is a species of beetle of the family Coccinellidae. It is found in China (Hebei, Henan, Guizhou, Peking).

== Description ==
Adults reach a length of about 2-2.2 mm. They have a yellow head and legs. The pronotum is also yellow, but with a dark brown spot. The elytron is black.
