= Scymnus quadrillum =

Scientific classification
- Kingdom: Animalia
- Phylum: Arthropoda
- Clade: Pancrustacea
- Class: Insecta
- Order: Coleoptera
- Suborder: Polyphaga
- Infraorder: Cucujiformia
- Family: Coccinellidae
- Genus: Scymnus
- Species: S. quadrillum

Binomial name
- Scymnus quadrillum Motschulsky, 1858

Species of beetle

Scymnus (Pullus) quadrillum, is a species of lady beetle found in India, Bangladesh, Sri Lanka, Thailand, Taiwan, Nepal, Vietnam, Laos, China, and Pakistan.

== Description ==
The total length of an adult scymnus quadrillum is about 1.6 to 2.0 mm. The body appears glabrous and clothed with dense pubescence. The head is brownish black and the eyes are comparably large. The pronotum and the elytra are dark to blue and shiny. The scutellum is black. There are two reddish spots found on each elytron, and the ventrum is brownish black. The abdominal postcoxal process is bifurcated and the postcoxal line is complete.

== Biology ==
It is a predator of wide range of whiteflies, mealybugs and aphids including: Aphis gossypii, Paracoccus marginatus and Pentalonia nigronervosa.
