= Scymnus hainanicus =

Scientific classification
- Kingdom: Animalia
- Phylum: Arthropoda
- Clade: Pancrustacea
- Class: Insecta
- Order: Coleoptera
- Suborder: Polyphaga
- Infraorder: Cucujiformia
- Family: Coccinellidae
- Genus: Scymnus
- Species: S. hainanicus

Binomial name
- Scymnus hainanicus Pang & Gordon, 1986

Species of beetle

Scymnus hainanicus is a species of beetle of the family Coccinellidae. It is found in China (Hainan).

== Description ==
Adults reach a length of about 2.6 mm. They have a reddish brown head. The pronotum is reddish brown with a dark brown spot. The elytron is dark brown with a reddish brown apex.
