= Scymnus bicolor =

Scientific classification
- Kingdom: Animalia
- Phylum: Arthropoda
- Clade: Pancrustacea
- Class: Insecta
- Order: Coleoptera
- Suborder: Polyphaga
- Infraorder: Cucujiformia
- Family: Coccinellidae
- Genus: Scymnus
- Species: S. bicolor

Binomial name
- Scymnus bicolor (Germain, 1854)

Synonyms
- Coccinella bicolor Germain, 1854

Species of beetle

Scymnus bicolor is a species of beetle of the family Coccinellidae. It is found in Chile.

== Description ==
Adults reach a length of about 1.6–2.1 mm. Adults are yellow. The elytron is black, with the apical one-eight yellow.
