= Scymnus kawamurai =

Scientific classification
- Kingdom: Animalia
- Phylum: Arthropoda
- Clade: Pancrustacea
- Class: Insecta
- Order: Coleoptera
- Suborder: Polyphaga
- Infraorder: Cucujiformia
- Family: Coccinellidae
- Genus: Scymnus
- Species: S. kawamurai

Binomial name
- Scymnus kawamurai (Ohta, 1929)

Synonyms
- Pullus kawamurai Ohta, 1929; Scymnus (Pullus) kamiyai Araki, 1964

Species of beetle

Scymnus kawamurai is a species of beetle of the family Coccinellidae. It is found in Japan and China (Fujian, Guangdong, Sichuan, Yunnan).

== Description ==
Adults reach a length of about 1.8–2.6 mm. They have a reddish brown to yellowish brown head. The pronotum is also reddish brown to yellowish brown, but with a black spot. The elytron is black with a yellowish brown apex.
