= Scymnus hoffmanni =

Scientific classification
- Kingdom: Animalia
- Phylum: Arthropoda
- Clade: Pancrustacea
- Class: Insecta
- Order: Coleoptera
- Suborder: Polyphaga
- Infraorder: Cucujiformia
- Family: Coccinellidae
- Genus: Scymnus
- Species: S. hoffmanni

Binomial name
- Scymnus hoffmanni Weise, 1879

Species of beetle

Scymnus hoffmanni is a species of beetle of the family Coccinellidae. It is found in Japan and China (Beijing, Jilin, Jiangsu, Liaoning, Shandong, Zhejiang).

== Description ==
Adults reach a length of about 1.9–2.2 mm. They have a reddish brown to yellowish brown head. The pronotum has a large black spot and the elytron is reddish brown, with a black sutural spot and a black lateral margin.
