= Scymnus simillimus =

Scientific classification
- Kingdom: Animalia
- Phylum: Arthropoda
- Clade: Pancrustacea
- Class: Insecta
- Order: Coleoptera
- Suborder: Polyphaga
- Infraorder: Cucujiformia
- Family: Coccinellidae
- Genus: Scymnus
- Species: S. simillimus

Binomial name
- Scymnus simillimus Gordon, 2001

Species of beetle

Scymnus simillimus is a species of beetle of the family Coccinellidae. It is found in Ecuador, Bolivia and Peru.

== Description ==
Adults reach a length of about 1.8-2.3 mm. Adults are medium to dark brown, with the head, anterior and lateral margins of the pronotum and sutural, lateral and apical areas of the elytron medium reddish brown.

== Etymology ==
The species name is derived from Latin simillimus (meaning similar) and refers to the resemblance to Scymnus murilloi.
