= Scymnus formosanus =

Scientific classification
- Kingdom: Animalia
- Phylum: Arthropoda
- Clade: Pancrustacea
- Class: Insecta
- Order: Coleoptera
- Suborder: Polyphaga
- Infraorder: Cucujiformia
- Family: Coccinellidae
- Genus: Scymnus
- Species: S. formosanus

Binomial name
- Scymnus formosanus (Weise, 1923)

Synonyms
- Rhyzobius formosanus Weise, 1923; Scymnus (Pullus) habaciensis Hoang, 1982

Species of beetle

Scymnus formosanus is a species of beetle of the family Coccinellidae. It is found in Taiwan and China (Sichuan).

== Description ==
Adults reach a length of about 2.45 mm. They have a yellow head and pronotum. The elytron is dark violet with the apical one-third yellow and with a dark red spot on the disc.
