= Scymnus binotulatus =

Scientific classification
- Kingdom: Animalia
- Phylum: Arthropoda
- Clade: Pancrustacea
- Class: Insecta
- Order: Coleoptera
- Suborder: Polyphaga
- Infraorder: Cucujiformia
- Family: Coccinellidae
- Genus: Scymnus
- Species: S. binotulatus

Binomial name
- Scymnus binotulatus Boheman, 1859

Species of beetle

Scymnus binotulatus is a species of beetle in the family Coccinellidae. It is found in Oceania and Southern Asia.
