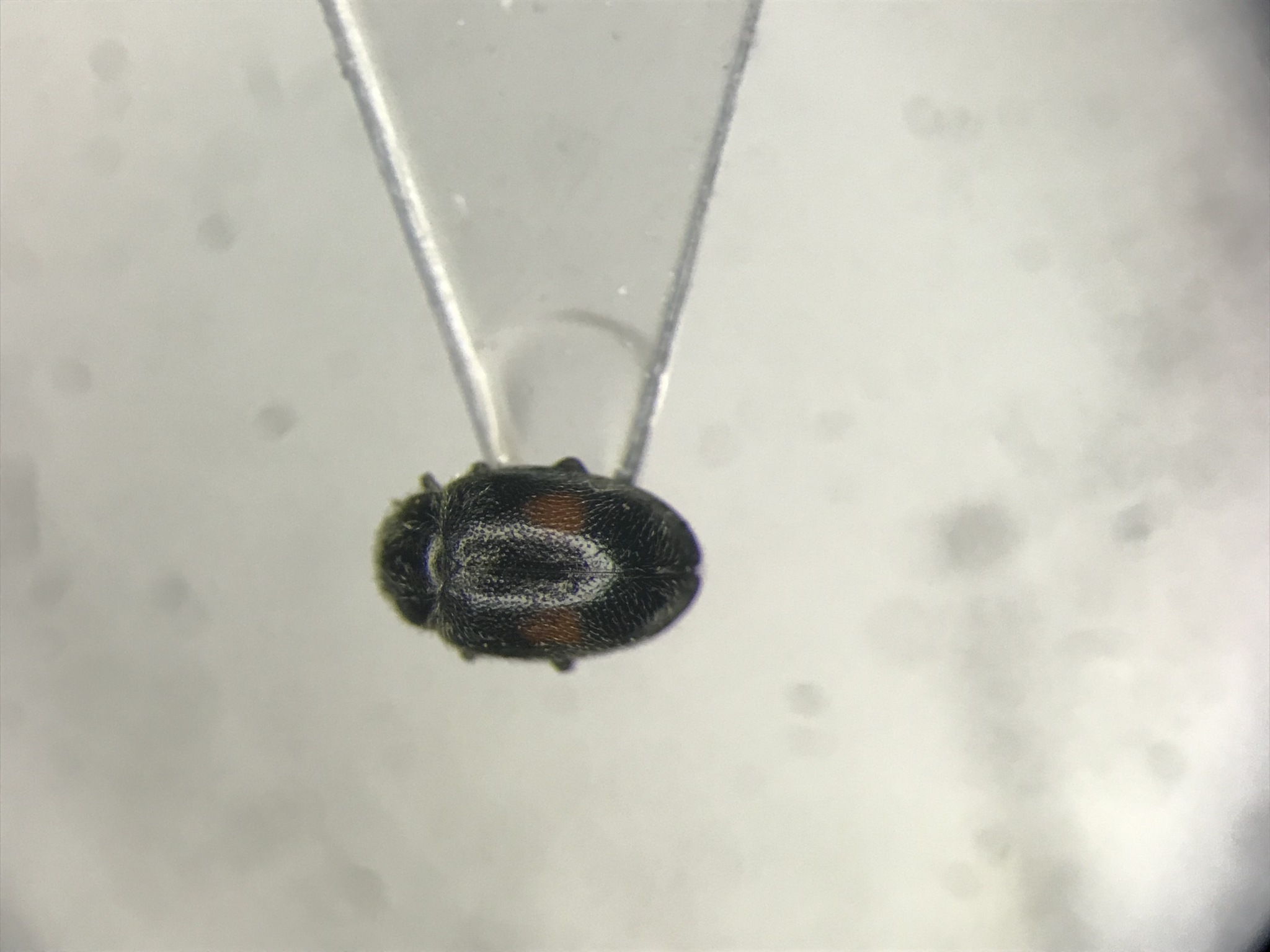

Scientific classification
- Kingdom: Animalia
- Phylum: Arthropoda
- Clade: Pancrustacea
- Class: Insecta
- Order: Coleoptera
- Suborder: Polyphaga
- Infraorder: Cucujiformia
- Family: Coccinellidae
- Genus: Scymnus
- Species: S. punctatum

Binomial name
- Scymnus punctatum (Melsheimer, 1847)

Synonyms
- Scymnus punctatus Melsheimer, 1847; Scymnus punctatum; Didion punctatum

= Scymnus punctatum =

Species of beetle

Scymnus punctatum, the twice-stained ladybug, is a species of dusky lady beetle in the family Coccinellidae. It is found in North America, where it has been recorded from Quebec to Alabama, west to British Columbia and California.

== Description ==
Adults reach a length of about 1.45-1.80 mm. They have a black or dark brown body, while the pronotal angle is pale. The elytron has a reddish-orange spot.
