= Scymnus ater =

Scientific classification
- Kingdom: Animalia
- Phylum: Arthropoda
- Clade: Pancrustacea
- Class: Insecta
- Order: Coleoptera
- Suborder: Polyphaga
- Infraorder: Cucujiformia
- Family: Coccinellidae
- Genus: Scymnus
- Species: S. ater

Binomial name
- Scymnus ater Kugelann, 1794

Species of beetle

Scymnus ater, is a species of beetle found in the family Coccinellidae. It is found in Central and Eastern Europe.
