= Scymnus nuttingi =

Scientific classification
- Kingdom: Animalia
- Phylum: Arthropoda
- Clade: Pancrustacea
- Class: Insecta
- Order: Coleoptera
- Suborder: Polyphaga
- Infraorder: Cucujiformia
- Family: Coccinellidae
- Genus: Scymnus
- Species: S. nuttingi

Binomial name
- Scymnus nuttingi Gordon, 1976

Species of beetle

Scymnus nuttingi, is a species of beetle found in the family Coccinellidae discovered by J. Gordon Edwards in 1976. It is found in North America.

For its visual system it has ocelli for eyes.
