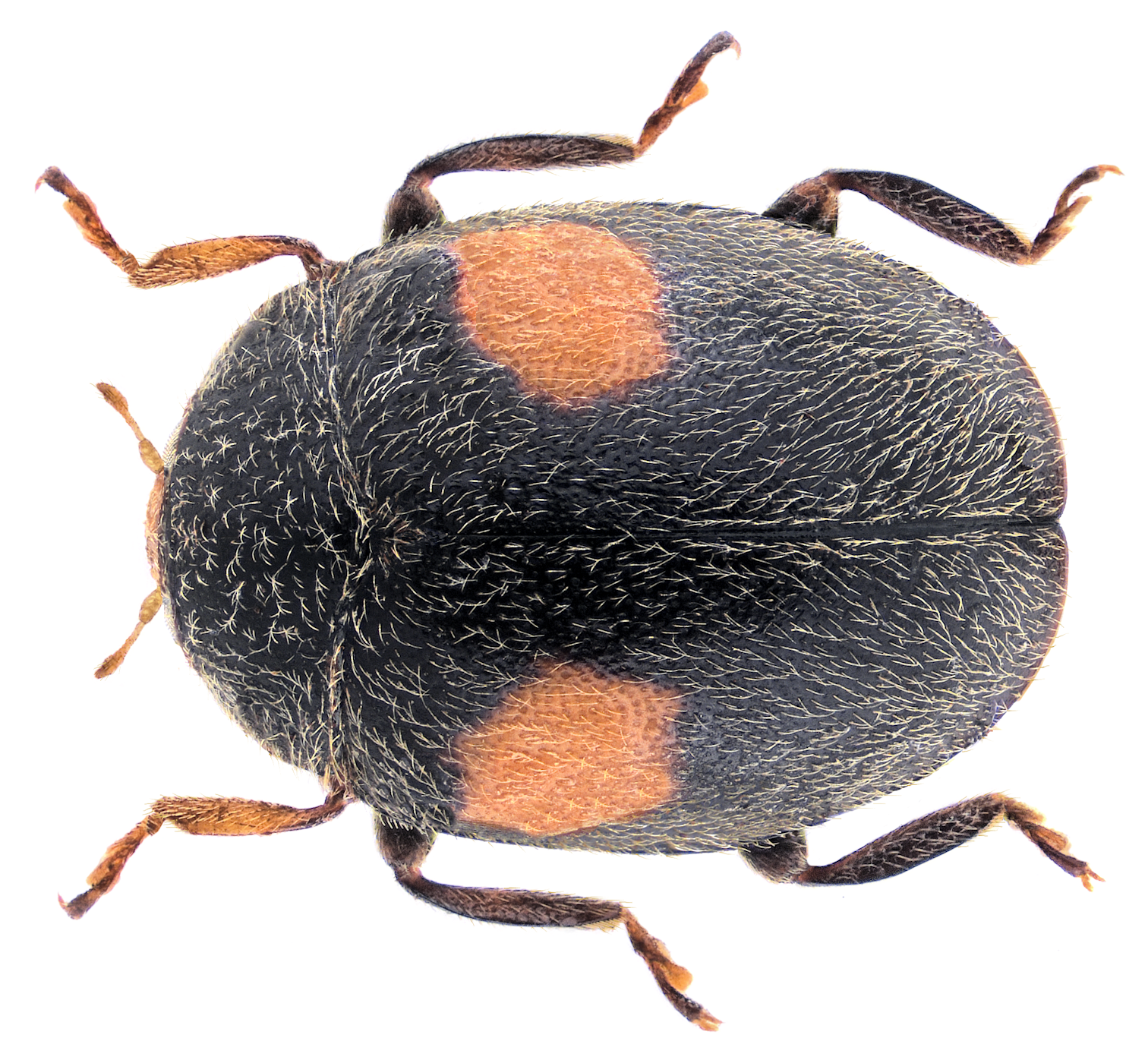

Scientific classification
- Kingdom: Animalia
- Phylum: Arthropoda
- Clade: Pancrustacea
- Class: Insecta
- Order: Coleoptera
- Suborder: Polyphaga
- Infraorder: Cucujiformia
- Family: Coccinellidae
- Genus: Scymnus
- Species: S. apetzi

Binomial name
- Scymnus apetzi Mulsant, 1846

= Scymnus apetzi =

Species of beetle

Scymnus apetzi is a species of beetle found in the family Coccinellidae. It is found in Europe.

It lives on common crops, for example Apple trees and feeds on aphids.
