= Scymnus koebelei =

Scientific classification
- Kingdom: Animalia
- Phylum: Arthropoda
- Clade: Pancrustacea
- Class: Insecta
- Order: Coleoptera
- Suborder: Polyphaga
- Infraorder: Cucujiformia
- Family: Coccinellidae
- Genus: Scymnus
- Species: S. koebelei

Binomial name
- Scymnus koebelei (Pang & Gordon, 1986)

Synonyms
- Keiscymnus koebelei Pang & Gordon, 1986

Species of beetle

Scymnus koebelei is a species of beetle of the family Coccinellidae. It is found in China (Hainan).

== Description ==
Adults reach a length of about 1.7 mm. Adults have a yellow head and pronotum and the elytron is dark brown, while the apical one-fourth is yellow.
