= Scymnus melanogaster =

Scientific classification
- Kingdom: Animalia
- Phylum: Arthropoda
- Clade: Pancrustacea
- Class: Insecta
- Order: Coleoptera
- Suborder: Polyphaga
- Infraorder: Cucujiformia
- Family: Coccinellidae
- Genus: Scymnus
- Species: S. melanogaster

Binomial name
- Scymnus melanogaster Mulsant, 1853

Species of beetle

Scymnus melanogaster is a species of beetle of the family Coccinellidae. It is found in Colombia and Venezuela.

== Description ==
Adults reach a length of about 2.0-2.5 mm. Adults are black with a reddish yellow head and pronotum.
