= Scymnus margipallens =

Scientific classification
- Kingdom: Animalia
- Phylum: Arthropoda
- Clade: Pancrustacea
- Class: Insecta
- Order: Coleoptera
- Suborder: Polyphaga
- Infraorder: Cucujiformia
- Family: Coccinellidae
- Genus: Scymnus
- Species: S. margipallens

Binomial name
- Scymnus margipallens Mulsant, 1850

Species of beetle

Scymnus margipallens, is a species of beetle found in the family Coccinellidae described by Étienne Mulsant in 1850. It is found in North America.
