= Scymnus paracanus =

Scientific classification
- Kingdom: Animalia
- Phylum: Arthropoda
- Clade: Pancrustacea
- Class: Insecta
- Order: Coleoptera
- Suborder: Polyphaga
- Infraorder: Cucujiformia
- Family: Coccinellidae
- Genus: Scymnus
- Species: S. paracanus

Binomial name
- Scymnus paracanus J. Chapin, 1973

Species of beetle

Scymnus paracanus is a species of dusky lady beetle in the family Coccinellidae. It is found in North America.

== Subspecies ==
These two subspecies belong to the species Scymnus paracanus:

- Scymnus paracanus linearis Gordon, 1976
- Scymnus paracanus paracanus J. Chapin, 1973
