= Scymnus tiaboensis =

Scientific classification
- Kingdom: Animalia
- Phylum: Arthropoda
- Clade: Pancrustacea
- Class: Insecta
- Order: Coleoptera
- Suborder: Polyphaga
- Infraorder: Cucujiformia
- Family: Coccinellidae
- Genus: Scymnus
- Species: S. tiaboensis

Binomial name
- Scymnus tiaboensis Gordon, 2001

Species of beetle

Scymnus tiaboensis is a species of beetle of the family Coccinellidae. It is found in Argentina.

== Description ==
Adults reach a length of about 1.7 mm. Adults are reddish yellow. The base, sutural and lateral margins of the elytron are piceous.

== Etymology ==
The species is named for the type location.
