= Scymnus pesenkoi =

Scientific classification
- Kingdom: Animalia
- Phylum: Arthropoda
- Clade: Pancrustacea
- Class: Insecta
- Order: Coleoptera
- Suborder: Polyphaga
- Infraorder: Cucujiformia
- Family: Coccinellidae
- Genus: Scymnus
- Species: S. pesenkoi

Binomial name
- Scymnus pesenkoi Ukrainsky, 2008

Synonyms
- Scymnus triangularis Gordon, 2001 (preocc.)

Species of beetle

Scymnus pesenkoi is a species of beetle of the family Coccinellidae. It is found in Colombia.

== Description ==
Adults reach a length of about 1.7 mm. Adults are black with a reddish yellow head. The anterior margin of the pronotum is also reddish yellow.
