= Scymnus demerarensis =

Scientific classification
- Kingdom: Animalia
- Phylum: Arthropoda
- Clade: Pancrustacea
- Class: Insecta
- Order: Coleoptera
- Suborder: Polyphaga
- Infraorder: Cucujiformia
- Family: Coccinellidae
- Genus: Scymnus
- Species: S. demerarensis

Binomial name
- Scymnus demerarensis Gordon, 2001

Species of beetle

Scymnus demerarensis is a species of beetle of the family Coccinellidae. It is found in Peru, Brazil, Bolivia, Suriname and Guyana.

== Description ==
Adults reach a length of about 1.6–1.7 mm. Adults are black with a yellow head. The apical border and anterior angle of the pronotum, as well as the apical one-tenth of the elytron are also yellow.

== Etymology ==
The species is named for the holotype locality.
