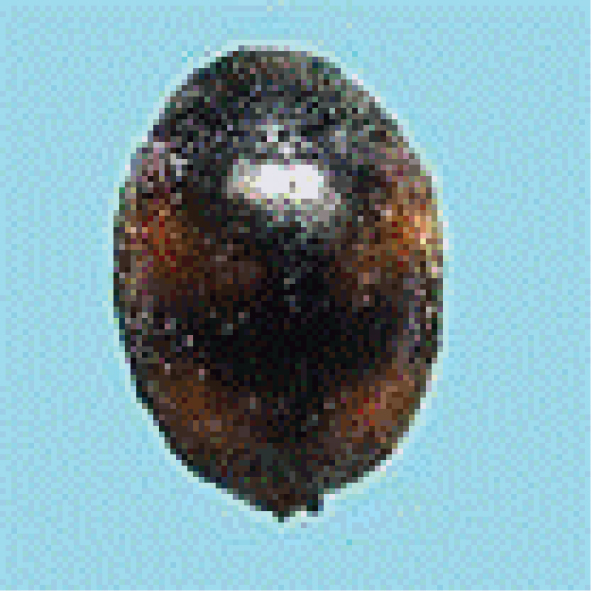

Scientific classification
- Kingdom: Animalia
- Phylum: Arthropoda
- Clade: Pancrustacea
- Class: Insecta
- Order: Coleoptera
- Suborder: Polyphaga
- Infraorder: Cucujiformia
- Family: Coccinellidae
- Genus: Scymnus
- Species: S. latemaculatus

Binomial name
- Scymnus latemaculatus Motschulsky, 1858

Synonyms
- Scymnus transversoplagiatus Motschulsky, 1858; Scymnus quadrinotatus Boheman, 1859 (preocc.); Pullus belophallus Capra, 1925; Pullus taiwanus Ohta, 1929; Scymnus (Pullus) elegans var. clathratus Sicard, 1929

= Scymnus latemaculatus =

Species of beetle

Scymnus (Pullus) latemaculatus is a species of lady beetle found in Pakistan, India, Bangladesh, Sri Lanka, Thailand, and Taiwan.

== Description ==
Body length is 1.5 to 2.0 mm. The body is long and dark brown in color. The elytra are densely pubescent.

== Biology ==
It is a predator of several whiteflies, aphids and scale insects such as Aphis punicae, Aphis craccivora, Brevicoryne brassicae, Lipaphis erysimi, Myzus persicae, Aphis gossypii, Hyadaphis coriandri, Hysteroneura setariae, Rhopalosiphum maidis, Therioaphis trifolii, Macrosiphum granarium, Schizaphis graminum, Phenacoccus solenopsis, Ferrisia virgata, Dactylopius opuntiae, Drosicha mangiferae, Amrasca devastans, Amrasca biguttula, Bemisia tabaci and Tetranychus atlanticus.

Host plants of the beetle include mustard, lucerne, cabbage, cauliflower, potato, turnip, bottle gourd, brinjal, okra, wheat, cotton, and rose.
