= Scymnus diekei =

Scientific classification
- Kingdom: Animalia
- Phylum: Arthropoda
- Clade: Pancrustacea
- Class: Insecta
- Order: Coleoptera
- Suborder: Polyphaga
- Infraorder: Cucujiformia
- Family: Coccinellidae
- Genus: Scymnus
- Species: S. diekei

Binomial name
- Scymnus diekei Gordon, 2001

Species of beetle

Scymnus diekei is a species of beetle of the family Coccinellidae. It is found in Colombia.

== Description ==
Adults reach a length of about 1.8 mm. Adults are reddish brown. The pronotum has a large piceous area.

== Etymology ==
The species is named for Gerhard Dieke, who collected the holotype.
