= Scymnus abbreviatus =

Scientific classification
- Kingdom: Animalia
- Phylum: Arthropoda
- Clade: Pancrustacea
- Class: Insecta
- Order: Coleoptera
- Suborder: Polyphaga
- Infraorder: Cucujiformia
- Family: Coccinellidae
- Genus: Scymnus
- Species: S. abbreviatus

Binomial name
- Scymnus abbreviatus LeConte, 1852

Species of beetle

Scymnus abbreviatus is a species of beetle found in the family Coccinellidae. It is found in Canada.

The beetle is less than 2mm in length with its range extending to southeastern Canada.
