= Scymnus fenderi =

Scientific classification
- Kingdom: Animalia
- Phylum: Arthropoda
- Clade: Pancrustacea
- Class: Insecta
- Order: Coleoptera
- Suborder: Polyphaga
- Infraorder: Cucujiformia
- Family: Coccinellidae
- Genus: Scymnus
- Species: S. fenderi

Binomial name
- Scymnus fenderi Malkin, 1943

Species of beetle

Scymnus fenderi, commonly known as Fender's lady beetle, is a species of beetle in the family Coccinellidae. It is found in North America, where it has been recorded from Oregon and Montana.
