= Scymnus bennetti =

Scientific classification
- Kingdom: Animalia
- Phylum: Arthropoda
- Clade: Pancrustacea
- Class: Insecta
- Order: Coleoptera
- Suborder: Polyphaga
- Infraorder: Cucujiformia
- Family: Coccinellidae
- Genus: Scymnus
- Species: S. bennetti

Binomial name
- Scymnus bennetti Gordon, 2001

Species of beetle

Scymnus bennetti is a species of beetle of the family Coccinellidae. It is found in Brazil.

== Description ==
Adults reach a length of about 2.1 mm. Adults are black. The discal area of the elytron is dark brown, while the apical one-eighth is yellow.

== Etymology ==
The species is named for the collector of the holotype.
