= Scymnus dozieri =

Scientific classification
- Kingdom: Animalia
- Phylum: Arthropoda
- Clade: Pancrustacea
- Class: Insecta
- Order: Coleoptera
- Suborder: Polyphaga
- Infraorder: Cucujiformia
- Family: Coccinellidae
- Genus: Scymnus
- Species: S. dozieri

Binomial name
- Scymnus dozieri Gordon, 2001

Species of beetle

Scymnus dozieri is a species of beetle of the family Coccinellidae. It is found in Ecuador.

== Description ==
Adults reach a length of about 2.0-2.2 mm. Adults are black with the head, pronotum and apical one-eight of the elytron reddish yellow. There is a small spot on the pronotum.

== Etymology ==
The species is named for Herbert Dozier, a colleague of the author.
