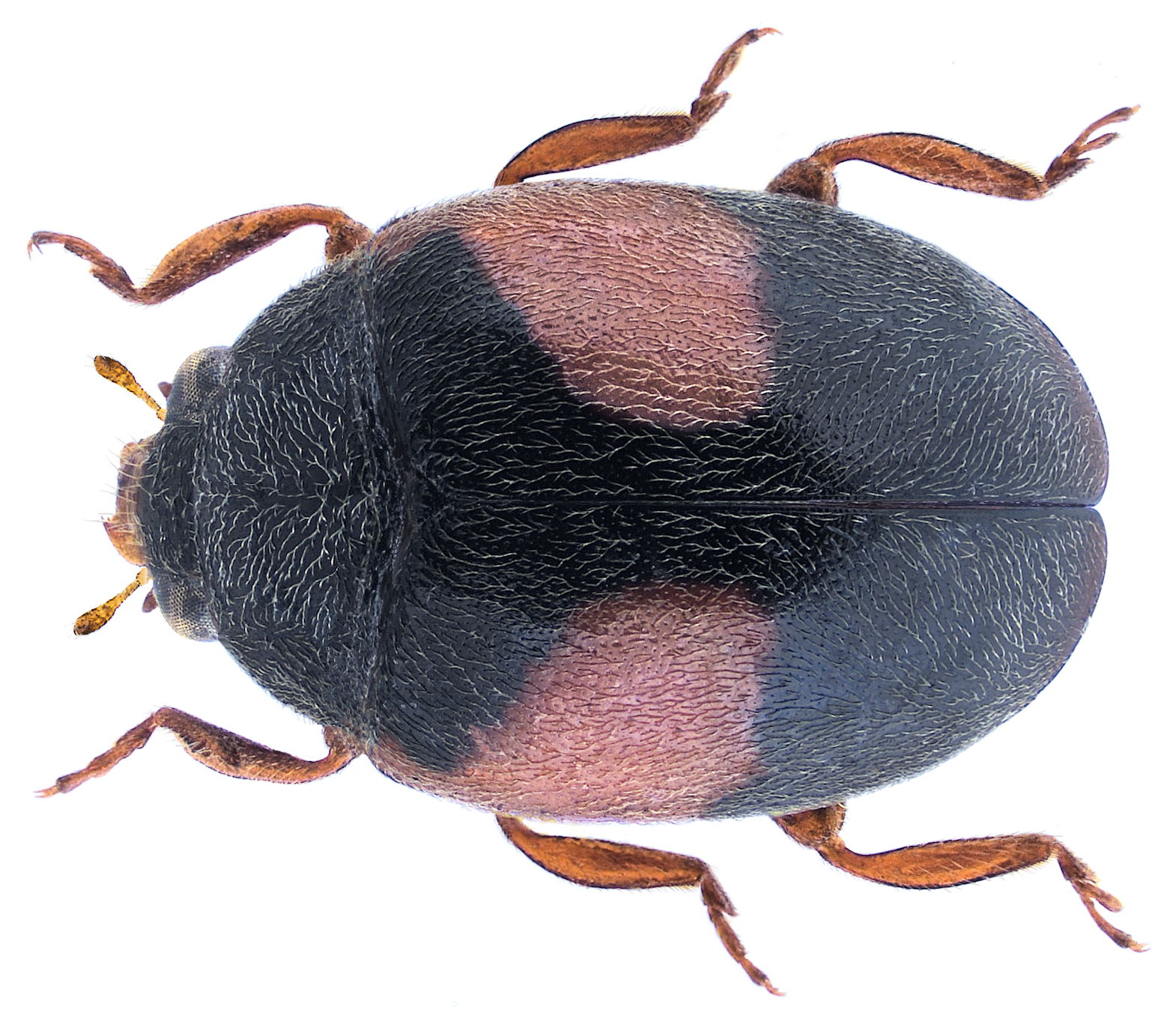
- S. marginalis

Scientific classification
- Kingdom: Animalia
- Phylum: Arthropoda
- Clade: Pancrustacea
- Class: Insecta
- Order: Coleoptera
- Suborder: Polyphaga
- Infraorder: Cucujiformia
- Family: Coccinellidae
- Genus: Scymnus
- Species: S. marginalis

Binomial name
- Scymnus marginalis Rossi, 1794

= Scymnus marginalis =

Species of beetle

Scymnus marginalis, is a species of beetle found in the family Coccinellidae. It is found in Europe.
