= Scymnus apicanus =

Scientific classification
- Kingdom: Animalia
- Phylum: Arthropoda
- Clade: Pancrustacea
- Class: Insecta
- Order: Coleoptera
- Suborder: Polyphaga
- Infraorder: Cucujiformia
- Family: Coccinellidae
- Genus: Scymnus
- Species: S. apicanus

Binomial name
- Scymnus apicanus J. Chapin, 1973

Synonyms
- Scymnus (Scymnus) apicanus borealis Gordon, 1976 (nec Hatch, 1961)

Species of beetle

Scymnus apicanus, the apicanus lady beetle, is a species of dusky lady beetle in the family Coccinellidae. It is found in North America.

== Subspecies ==
These three subspecies belong to the species Scymnus apicanus:

- Scymnus apicanus apicanus J. Chapin, 1973
- Scymnus apicanus pseudapicanus Gordon, 1985
