= Scymnus nebulosus =

Scientific classification
- Kingdom: Animalia
- Phylum: Arthropoda
- Clade: Pancrustacea
- Class: Insecta
- Order: Coleoptera
- Suborder: Polyphaga
- Infraorder: Cucujiformia
- Family: Coccinellidae
- Genus: Scymnus
- Species: S. nebulosus

Binomial name
- Scymnus nebulosus LeConte, 1852

Synonyms
- Scymnus infuscatus Boheman, 1859; Scymnus phelpsii Crotch, 1874; Scymnus (Scymnus) harneyi Hatch, 1961

Species of beetle

Scymnus nebulosus, the nebulous lady beetle, is a species of dusky lady beetle in the family Coccinellidae. It is found in North America and Oceania.
