= Scymnus gachetensis =

Scientific classification
- Kingdom: Animalia
- Phylum: Arthropoda
- Clade: Pancrustacea
- Class: Insecta
- Order: Coleoptera
- Suborder: Polyphaga
- Infraorder: Cucujiformia
- Family: Coccinellidae
- Genus: Scymnus
- Species: S. gachetensis

Binomial name
- Scymnus gachetensis Gordon, 2001

Species of beetle

Scymnus gachetensis is a species of beetle of the family Coccinellidae. It is found in Colombia and Venezuela.

== Description ==
Adults reach a length of about 2.0-2.4 mm. Adults are black, with the apical two-third of the head yellow. The lateral one-fourth of the pronotum is also yellow.

== Etymology ==
The species is named for one of the collection sites of this species.
