= Scymnus kansanus =

Scientific classification
- Kingdom: Animalia
- Phylum: Arthropoda
- Clade: Pancrustacea
- Class: Insecta
- Order: Coleoptera
- Suborder: Polyphaga
- Infraorder: Cucujiformia
- Family: Coccinellidae
- Genus: Scymnus
- Species: S. kansanus

Binomial name
- Scymnus kansanus Leconte, 1852

Species of beetle

Scymnus kansanus, the Kansas lady beetle, is a species of dusky lady beetle in the family Coccinellidae. It is found in North America.
