= Scymnus rubicundus =

Scientific classification
- Kingdom: Animalia
- Phylum: Arthropoda
- Clade: Pancrustacea
- Class: Insecta
- Order: Coleoptera
- Suborder: Polyphaga
- Infraorder: Cucujiformia
- Family: Coccinellidae
- Genus: Scymnus
- Species: S. rubicundus

Binomial name
- Scymnus rubicundus Erichson, 1847

Synonyms
- Scymnus (Pullus) limbaticollis Mulsant, 1850; Pullus argentinicus Weise, 1905; Pullus piceipennis Brèthes, 1925; Pullus hians Brèthes, 1925; Pullus errator Brèthes, 1925b; Pullus percomis Brèthes, 1925

Species of beetle

Scymnus rubicundus is a species of beetle of the family Coccinellidae. It is found in all of South America, except Chile and southern Argentina.

== Description ==
Adults reach a length of about 1.5–2.1 mm. Adults are yellow. The pronotum has a black spot. The elytron is light reddish brown with black borders.
