= Scymnus difficilis =

Scientific classification
- Kingdom: Animalia
- Phylum: Arthropoda
- Clade: Pancrustacea
- Class: Insecta
- Order: Coleoptera
- Suborder: Polyphaga
- Infraorder: Cucujiformia
- Family: Coccinellidae
- Genus: Scymnus
- Species: S. difficilis

Binomial name
- Scymnus difficilis Casey, 1899

Species of beetle

Scymnus difficilis is a species of dusky lady beetle in the family Coccinellidae. It is found in North America, where it is recorded from southern California.

== Description ==
Adults reach a length of about 1.8-2.1 mm.
