= Scymnus spanglerorum =

Scientific classification
- Kingdom: Animalia
- Phylum: Arthropoda
- Clade: Pancrustacea
- Class: Insecta
- Order: Coleoptera
- Suborder: Polyphaga
- Infraorder: Cucujiformia
- Family: Coccinellidae
- Genus: Scymnus
- Species: S. spanglerorum

Binomial name
- Scymnus spanglerorum Gordon, 2001

Species of beetle

Scymnus spanglerorum is a species of beetle of the family Coccinellidae. It is found in Bolivia, Ecuador, Brazil and Peru.

== Description ==
Adults reach a length of about 2.0-2.3 mm. Adults are dark brown with a brownish yellow head. The anterior border and lateral one-sixth of the pronotum are also brownish yellow.

== Etymology ==
The specie is named for the collectors of the holotype.
