= Scymnus napoensis =

Scientific classification
- Kingdom: Animalia
- Phylum: Arthropoda
- Clade: Pancrustacea
- Class: Insecta
- Order: Coleoptera
- Suborder: Polyphaga
- Infraorder: Cucujiformia
- Family: Coccinellidae
- Genus: Scymnus
- Species: S. napoensis

Binomial name
- Scymnus napoensis Gordon, 2001

Species of beetle

Scymnus napoensis is a species of beetle of the family Coccinellidae. It is found in Ecuador.

== Description ==
Adults reach a length of about 1.7–2.5 mm. Adults are piceous. The anterior border of the pronotum and the apical one-eight of the elytron are brownish yellow.

== Etymology ==
The species is named for the province of Ecuador.
