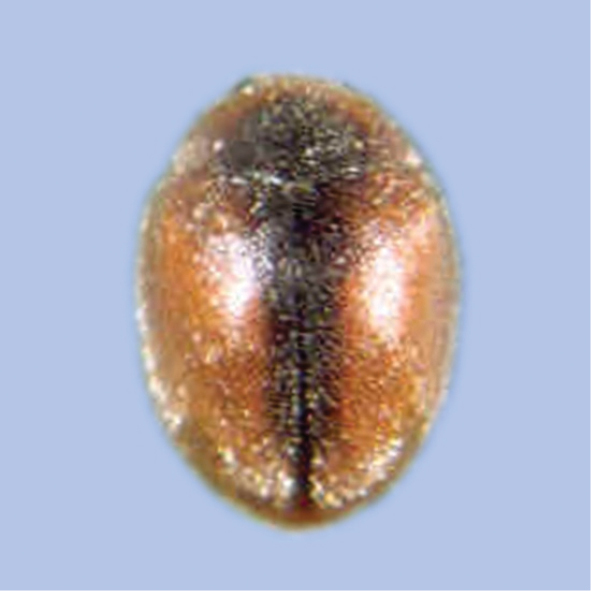

Scientific classification
- Kingdom: Animalia
- Phylum: Arthropoda
- Clade: Pancrustacea
- Class: Insecta
- Order: Coleoptera
- Suborder: Polyphaga
- Infraorder: Cucujiformia
- Family: Coccinellidae
- Genus: Scymnus
- Species: S. nubilus

Binomial name
- Scymnus nubilus Mulsant, 1850

Synonyms
- Scymnus curtisii Mulsant, 1850; Scymnus stabilis Motschulsky, 1866; Scymnus lateralis Sicard, 1913

= Scymnus nubilus =

Species of beetle

Scymnus (Scymnus) nubilus, is a species of lady beetle found in Pakistan, India, Bangladesh, Sri Lanka, Nepal, Myanmar, China, and Asia Minor.

== Description ==
Body length is 1.5 to 2.0 mm. Maximum body weight is about 1.5 mg. Body small, elongate, and moderately convex. Body dark brown ventrally, and densely covered with fine, short, transparent, yellowish hairs. Head light brown to dark brown in color. Eyes are large and brown. Antennae small, and segmented. Pronotum dark brown, in which middle part is much darker and posterior, anterior margins are lighter reddish brown. Elytra mainly yellowish to reddish brown, and punctate. There is a dark brown to black sutural stripe from basal margin of elytra.

== Biology ==
Primarily an aphidophagous species, it is also a predator of several mealybugs and scale insects. The diet include: Aphis craccivora, Aphis fabae, Brevicoryne brassicae, Lipaphis erysimi, Myzus persicae, Aphis gossypii, Aphis spiraecola, Aphis frangulae, Cinara juniperi, Hyadaphis coriandri, Hysteroneura setariae, Rhopalosiphum maidis, Therioaphis trifolii, Macrosiphum granarium, Schizaphis graminum, Phenacoccus solenopsis, Ferrisia virgata, Drosicha mangiferae, Amrasca devastans, Amrasca biguttula, Bemisia tabaci, Tetranychus atlanticus, Toxoptera aurantii, Adelges joshii, Aonidiella auranti, Aonidiella citrina, Aonidiella orientalis, Aspidiotus destructor, Hemiberiesia latanias, Rhopalosiphum padi, Leucaspis coniferarum, Parlatoria, Pentalonia nigronervosa, Pinnaspis strachani, Quadraspidiotus perniciosus, Maconellicoccus hirsutus and Tecaspis.

Host plants of the beetle include: mustard, lucerne, cabbage, cauliflower, potato, turnip, bottle gourd, brinjal, okra, wheat, cotton and rose. Mating occurs about 4 to 5 days after emergence of the adult. Then oviposition followed after 6 days. Eggs are laid singly during an oviposition period of more than a month, where the female lays about 9 eggs each. Larva produces a wax layer by dorsal epidermal cells, which is an effective defensive mechanism.
