= Scymnus calabozoensis =

Scientific classification
- Kingdom: Animalia
- Phylum: Arthropoda
- Clade: Pancrustacea
- Class: Insecta
- Order: Coleoptera
- Suborder: Polyphaga
- Infraorder: Cucujiformia
- Family: Coccinellidae
- Genus: Scymnus
- Species: S. calabozoensis

Binomial name
- Scymnus calabozoensis Gordon, 2001

Species of beetle

Scymnus calabozoensis is a species of beetle of the family Coccinellidae. It is found in Venezuela.

== Description ==
Adults reach a length of about 2.1-2.3 mm. Adults are dark brown with a reddish yellow head. The anterior and lateral areas of the pronotum are also reddish yellow.

== Etymology ==
The species is named for the type locality.
