= Scymnus kraussi =

Scientific classification
- Kingdom: Animalia
- Phylum: Arthropoda
- Clade: Pancrustacea
- Class: Insecta
- Order: Coleoptera
- Suborder: Polyphaga
- Infraorder: Cucujiformia
- Family: Coccinellidae
- Genus: Scymnus
- Species: S. kraussi

Binomial name
- Scymnus kraussi Gordon, 2001

Species of beetle

Scymnus kraussi is a species of beetle of the family Coccinellidae. It is found in Brazil.

== Description ==
Adults reach a length of about 1.7–1.8 mm. Adults are black, with the apical margin of the pronotum and apical one-tenth of the elytron yellow.

== Etymology ==
The species is named for the collector of the type series.
