= Scymnus barberi =

Scientific classification
- Kingdom: Animalia
- Phylum: Arthropoda
- Clade: Pancrustacea
- Class: Insecta
- Order: Coleoptera
- Suborder: Polyphaga
- Infraorder: Cucujiformia
- Family: Coccinellidae
- Genus: Scymnus
- Species: S. barberi

Binomial name
- Scymnus barberi Gordon, 1976

Species of beetle

Scymnus barberi is a species of beetle found in the family Coccinellidae. It is found in North America.
