= Scymnus majus =

Scientific classification
- Kingdom: Animalia
- Phylum: Arthropoda
- Clade: Pancrustacea
- Class: Insecta
- Order: Coleoptera
- Suborder: Polyphaga
- Infraorder: Cucujiformia
- Family: Coccinellidae
- Genus: Scymnus
- Species: S. majus

Binomial name
- Scymnus majus Gordon, 1985

Synonyms
- Scymnus (Pullus) majusculus Wingo, 1952 (preocc.)

Species of beetle

Scymnus majus, is a species of beetle found in the family Coccinellidae. It is found in North America.

== Etymology ==
The species name is derived from Latin majus and refers to the large size, of the species.
