= Scymnus trulla =

Scientific classification
- Kingdom: Animalia
- Phylum: Arthropoda
- Clade: Pancrustacea
- Class: Insecta
- Order: Coleoptera
- Suborder: Polyphaga
- Infraorder: Cucujiformia
- Family: Coccinellidae
- Genus: Scymnus
- Species: S. trulla

Binomial name
- Scymnus trulla Gordon, 2001

Species of beetle

Scymnus trulla is a species of beetle of the family Coccinellidae. It is found in Ecuador.

== Description ==
Adults reach a length of about 1.6–2.1 mm. Adults are light reddish brown, while the pronotum is piceous with a light reddish brown anterior margin and anterolateral area. The basal margin of the elytron is piceous.

== Etymology ==
The species name is derived from Latin trulla (meaning spoon) and refers to the short, spatulate paramere of the male genitalia.
