= Scymnus andrewsi =

Scientific classification
- Kingdom: Animalia
- Phylum: Arthropoda
- Clade: Pancrustacea
- Class: Insecta
- Order: Coleoptera
- Suborder: Polyphaga
- Infraorder: Cucujiformia
- Family: Coccinellidae
- Genus: Scymnus
- Species: S. andrewsi

Binomial name
- Scymnus andrewsi Gordon, 2001

Species of beetle

Scymnus andrewsi is a species of beetle of the family Coccinellidae. It is found in Argentina.

== Description ==
Adults reach a length of about 1.8-2.0 mm. Adults are pale reddish yellow.

== Etymology ==
The species is named for Fred Andrews, who provided the holotype of this species for study.
