= Scymnus coosi =

Scientific classification
- Kingdom: Animalia
- Phylum: Arthropoda
- Clade: Pancrustacea
- Class: Insecta
- Order: Coleoptera
- Suborder: Polyphaga
- Infraorder: Cucujiformia
- Family: Coccinellidae
- Genus: Scymnus
- Species: S. coosi

Binomial name
- Scymnus coosi Hatch, 1961

Species of beetle

Scymnus coosi is a species of beetle of the family Coccinellidae. It is found in North America, where it has been recorded from Oregon.
