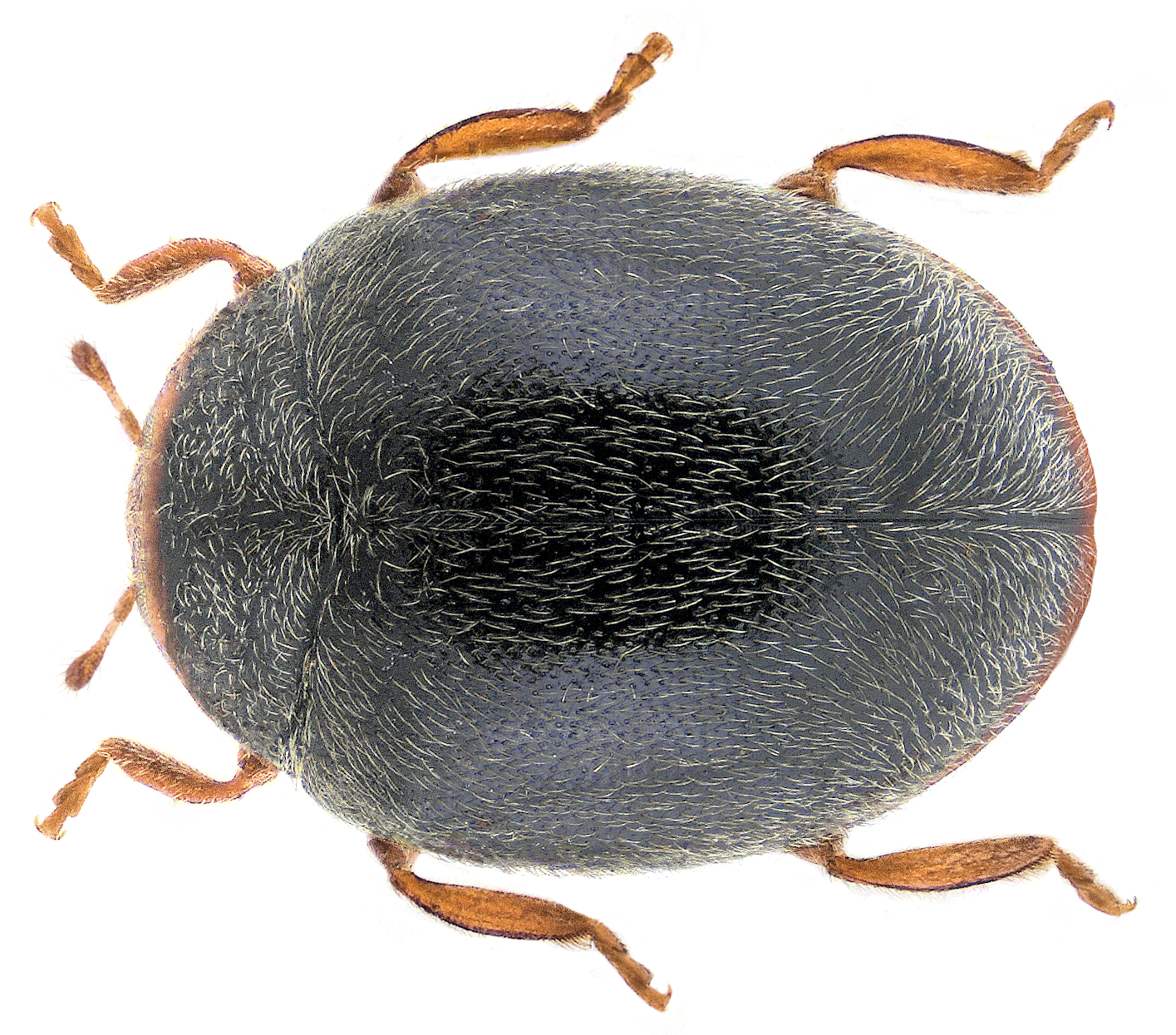

Scientific classification
- Kingdom: Animalia
- Phylum: Arthropoda
- Clade: Pancrustacea
- Class: Insecta
- Order: Coleoptera
- Suborder: Polyphaga
- Infraorder: Cucujiformia
- Family: Coccinellidae
- Genus: Scymnus
- Species: S. auritus

Binomial name
- Scymnus auritus Thunberg, 1795

= Scymnus auritus =

Species of beetle

Scymnus auritus is a species of beetle in family Coccinellidae. It is found in the Palearctic. It is a tiny (2mm. -2.5 2mm.) black ladybird associated with Quercus robur woodland.

== Biology ==
In Central Europe it is a mainly found in deciduous forests, groves, and light forests. In spring, the beetles were found on flowering Prunus padus and Crataegus monogyna and later, on oaks and Tilia × europaea The insects feed on aphids on oaks, less frequently on other trees. S. auritus was also reported as a predator of mites occurring on the underside of oak leaves; it also feeds on Phylloxeridae

== Distribution ==
Europe, Cyprus, European Russia, the Caucasus, Siberia, the Russian Far East; Belarus, Ukraine, Moldova, Transcaucasia, Middle Asia, Western Asia, China.
