= Scymnus creperus =

Scientific classification
- Kingdom: Animalia
- Phylum: Arthropoda
- Clade: Pancrustacea
- Class: Insecta
- Order: Coleoptera
- Suborder: Polyphaga
- Infraorder: Cucujiformia
- Family: Coccinellidae
- Genus: Scymnus
- Species: S. creperus

Binomial name
- Scymnus creperus Mulsant, 1850

Synonyms
- Scymnus (Pullus) medionotans Casey, 1899; Scymnus (Pullus) subtropicus Casey, 1899; Scymnus (Pullus) hortensis Wingo, 1952

Species of beetle

Scymnus creperus is a species of dusky lady beetle in the family Coccinellidae. It is found in North America, where it has been recorded from Pennsylvania to Colorado, south to Texas and Florida. It is also found in Bermuda.

== Description ==
Adults reach a length of about 1.76-2.68 mm. Adults have a yellowish red head. The pronotum is yellowish red with a small black spot. The elytron is black with a red apex.

== Biology ==
They probably prey on aphid species.
