= Scymnus citreus =

Scientific classification
- Kingdom: Animalia
- Phylum: Arthropoda
- Clade: Pancrustacea
- Class: Insecta
- Order: Coleoptera
- Suborder: Polyphaga
- Infraorder: Cucujiformia
- Family: Coccinellidae
- Genus: Scymnus
- Species: S. citreus

Binomial name
- Scymnus citreus Gordon, 2001

Species of beetle

Scymnus citreus is a species of beetle of the family Coccinellidae. It is found in Argentina.

== Description ==
Adults reach a length of about 1.8-2.0 mm. Adults are yellow, with the median half of the pronotum reddish yellow. The elytron has reddish brown sutural and lateral margins and a small reddish brown spot.

== Etymology ==
The species name is derived from Latin citreus and refers to the lemon yellow colour of the species.
