= Scymnus cerinotum =

Scientific classification
- Kingdom: Animalia
- Phylum: Arthropoda
- Clade: Pancrustacea
- Class: Insecta
- Order: Coleoptera
- Suborder: Polyphaga
- Infraorder: Cucujiformia
- Family: Coccinellidae
- Genus: Scymnus
- Species: S. cerinotum

Binomial name
- Scymnus cerinotum Gordon, 2001

Species of beetle

Scymnus cerinotum is a species of beetle of the family Coccinellidae. It is found in Colombia, Peru and Venezuela.

== Description ==
Adults reach a length of about 1.9–2.1 mm. Adults are yellow. The elytron is black with the apical one-tenth yellow.

== Etymology ==
The species name is derived from Latin cerinus (meaning waxy yellow) and notum (meaning upper side of a segment) and refers to the yellow pronotum.
