= Scymnus coniferarum =

Scientific classification
- Kingdom: Animalia
- Phylum: Arthropoda
- Clade: Pancrustacea
- Class: Insecta
- Order: Coleoptera
- Suborder: Polyphaga
- Infraorder: Cucujiformia
- Family: Coccinellidae
- Genus: Scymnus
- Species: S. coniferarum

Binomial name
- Scymnus coniferarum Abbot & Smith, 1797

Species of beetle

Scymnus coniferarum, the conifer lady beetle, is a species of dusky lady beetle in the family Coccinellidae. It is found in western North America.

S. coniferarum is being evaluated as a potential biological control for the Hemlock woolly adelgid infestation of the eastern hemlock on the east coast.
