= Scymnus monticola =

Scientific classification
- Kingdom: Animalia
- Phylum: Arthropoda
- Class: Insecta
- Order: Coleoptera
- Suborder: Polyphaga
- Infraorder: Cucujiformia
- Family: Coccinellidae
- Genus: Scymnus
- Species: S. monticola

Binomial name
- Scymnus monticola Casey, 1899

Species of beetle

Scymnus monticola, is a species of beetle found in the family Coccinellidae discovered by Thomas Lincoln Casey Jr. in 1899. It is found in North America.
