= Scymnus opaculus =

Scientific classification
- Kingdom: Animalia
- Phylum: Arthropoda
- Clade: Pancrustacea
- Class: Insecta
- Order: Coleoptera
- Suborder: Polyphaga
- Infraorder: Cucujiformia
- Family: Coccinellidae
- Genus: Scymnus
- Species: S. opaculus

Binomial name
- Scymnus opaculus Horn, 1895

Species of beetle

Scymnus opaculus is a species of beetle of the family Coccinellidae. It is found in North America, where it has been recorded from Colorado.
