= Scymnus rohdendorfi =

Scientific classification
- Kingdom: Animalia
- Phylum: Arthropoda
- Clade: Pancrustacea
- Class: Insecta
- Order: Coleoptera
- Suborder: Polyphaga
- Infraorder: Cucujiformia
- Family: Coccinellidae
- Genus: Scymnus
- Species: S. rohdendorfi

Binomial name
- Scymnus rohdendorfi Ukrainsky, 2008

Synonyms
- Scymnus (Pullus) hamatus Gordon, 2001 (preocc.)

Species of beetle

Scymnus rohdendorfi is a species of beetle of the family Coccinellidae. It is found in Suriname, Ecuador, Colombia and Venezuela.

== Description ==
Adults reach a length of about 1.6–2.1 mm. Adults are black with a yellow head. The apical margin and anterolateral area of the pronotum are also yellow.
