= Scymnus gnomus =

Scientific classification
- Kingdom: Animalia
- Phylum: Arthropoda
- Clade: Pancrustacea
- Class: Insecta
- Order: Coleoptera
- Suborder: Polyphaga
- Infraorder: Cucujiformia
- Family: Coccinellidae
- Genus: Scymnus
- Species: S. gnomus

Binomial name
- Scymnus gnomus Gordon, 2001

Species of beetle

Scymnus gnomus is a species of beetle of the family Coccinellidae. It is found in Brazil.

== Description ==
Adults reach a length of about 1.7 mm. Adults are piceous. The anterior border and lateral one-sixth of the pronotum are brownish yellow.

== Etymology ==
The species name is derived from Latin gnomus and refers to the small size.
