= Scymnus menkei =

Scientific classification
- Kingdom: Animalia
- Phylum: Arthropoda
- Clade: Pancrustacea
- Class: Insecta
- Order: Coleoptera
- Suborder: Polyphaga
- Infraorder: Cucujiformia
- Family: Coccinellidae
- Genus: Scymnus
- Species: S. menkei

Binomial name
- Scymnus menkei Gordon, 2001

Species of beetle

Scymnus menkei is a species of beetle of the family Coccinellidae. It is found in Venezuela.

== Description ==
Adults reach a length of about 1.7-1.9 mm. Adults are piceous, with most of the pronotum and the apical one-sixth of the elytron reddish yellow.

== Etymology ==
The species is named for Arnold Menke, the collector of the holotype.
