= Scymnus horni =

Scientific classification
- Kingdom: Animalia
- Phylum: Arthropoda
- Clade: Pancrustacea
- Class: Insecta
- Order: Coleoptera
- Suborder: Polyphaga
- Infraorder: Cucujiformia
- Family: Coccinellidae
- Genus: Scymnus
- Species: S. horni

Binomial name
- Scymnus horni Gorham, 1897

Species of beetle

Scymnus horni is a species of dusky lady beetle in the family Coccinellidae. It is found in Central America, North America, and Oceania.
