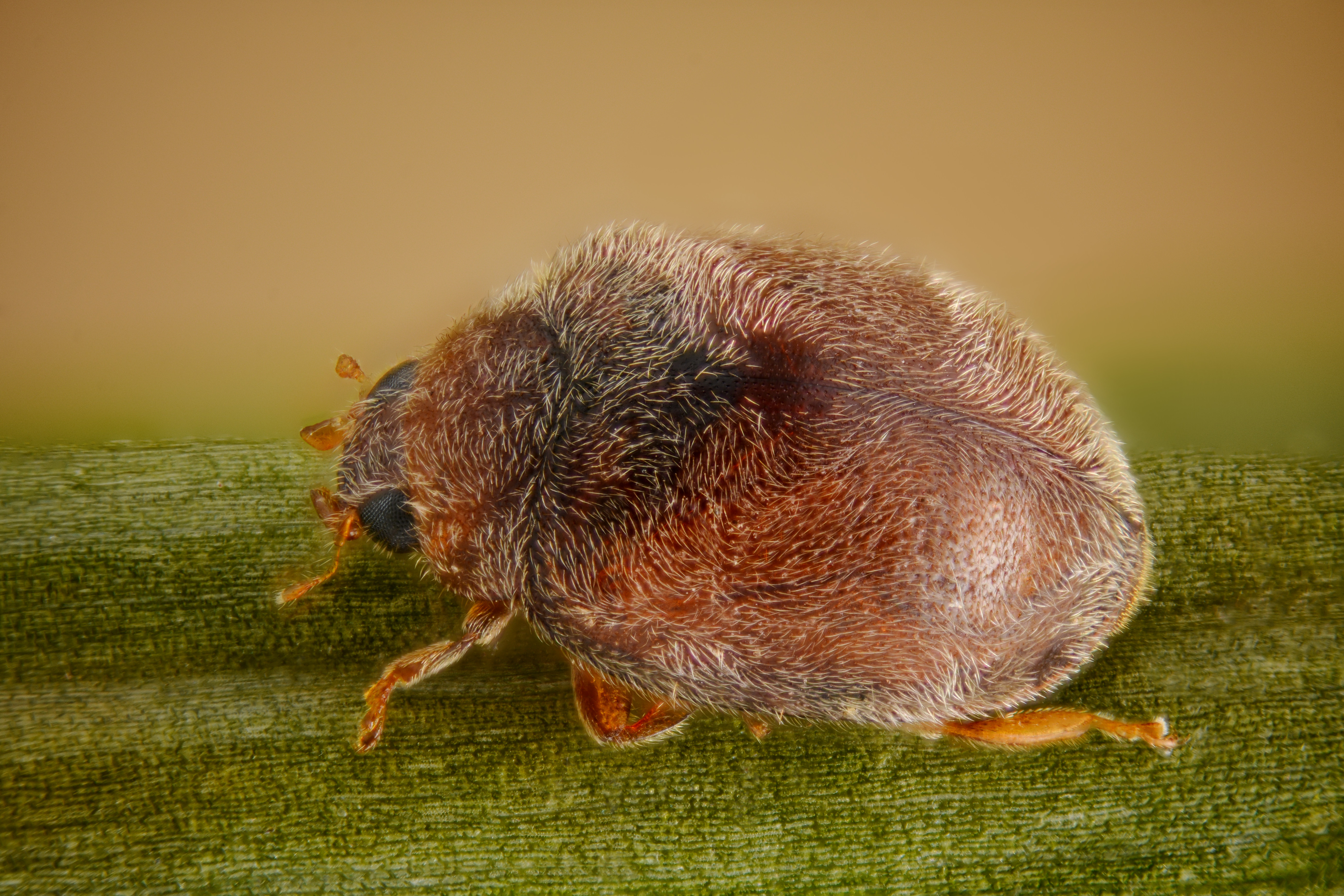

Scientific classification
- Kingdom: Animalia
- Phylum: Arthropoda
- Clade: Pancrustacea
- Class: Insecta
- Order: Coleoptera
- Suborder: Polyphaga
- Infraorder: Cucujiformia
- Family: Coccinellidae
- Genus: Scymnus
- Species: S. impexus

Binomial name
- Scymnus impexus Mulsant, 1850

Synonyms
- Scymnus (Pullus) abietis Mulsant, 1846 (not Paykull, 1798)

= Scymnus impexus =

Species of beetle

Scymnus impexus is a species of dusky lady beetle in the family Coccinellidae. It is found in Europe and Northern Asia (excluding China) and North America.

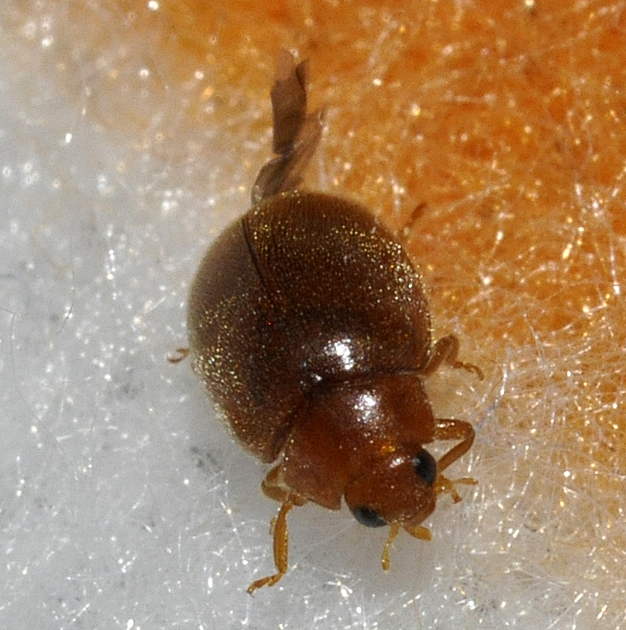
