= Scymnus pacificus =

Scientific classification
- Kingdom: Animalia
- Phylum: Arthropoda
- Clade: Pancrustacea
- Class: Insecta
- Order: Coleoptera
- Suborder: Polyphaga
- Infraorder: Cucujiformia
- Family: Coccinellidae
- Genus: Scymnus
- Species: S. pacificus

Binomial name
- Scymnus pacificus Crotch, 1874

Synonyms
- Scymnus strabus Horn, 1895

Species of beetle

Scymnus pacificus is a species of beetle of the family Coccinellidae. It is found in North America, where it has been recorded from California to western Texas, Colorado and Utah.

== Description ==
Adults reach a length of about 2-2.8 mm.
