= Scymnus paprzyckii =

Scientific classification
- Kingdom: Animalia
- Phylum: Arthropoda
- Clade: Pancrustacea
- Class: Insecta
- Order: Coleoptera
- Suborder: Polyphaga
- Infraorder: Cucujiformia
- Family: Coccinellidae
- Genus: Scymnus
- Species: S. paprzyckii

Binomial name
- Scymnus paprzyckii Gordon, 2001

Species of beetle

Scymnus paprzyckii is a species of beetle of the family Coccinellidae. It is found in Peru.

== Description ==
Adults reach a length of about 2.7-3.0 mm. Adults are black with a reddish brown head. The anterior margin of the pronotum is also reddish brown.

== Etymology ==
The species is named for the collector of the holotype.
