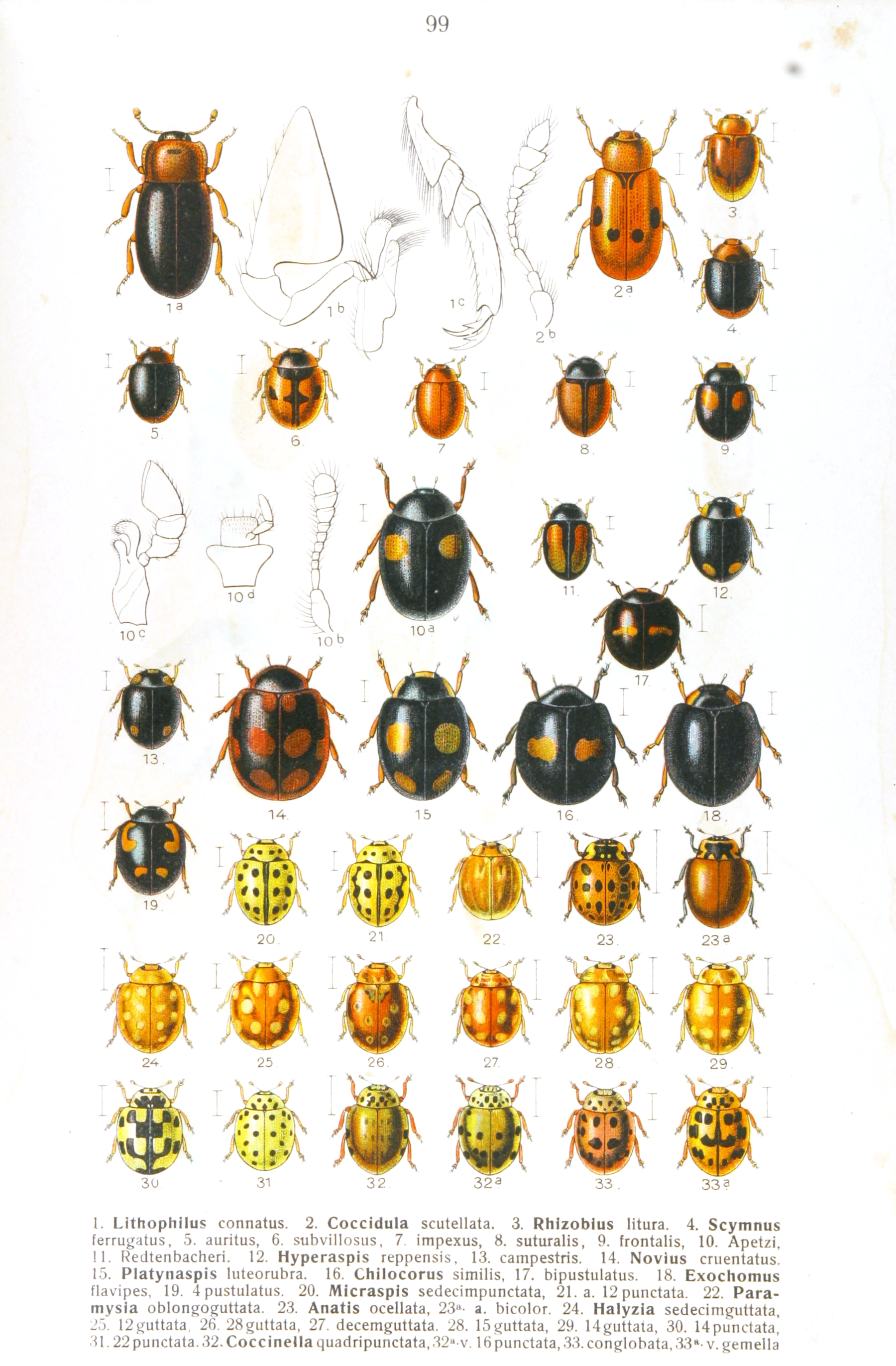
- Scymnus suturalis no. 8
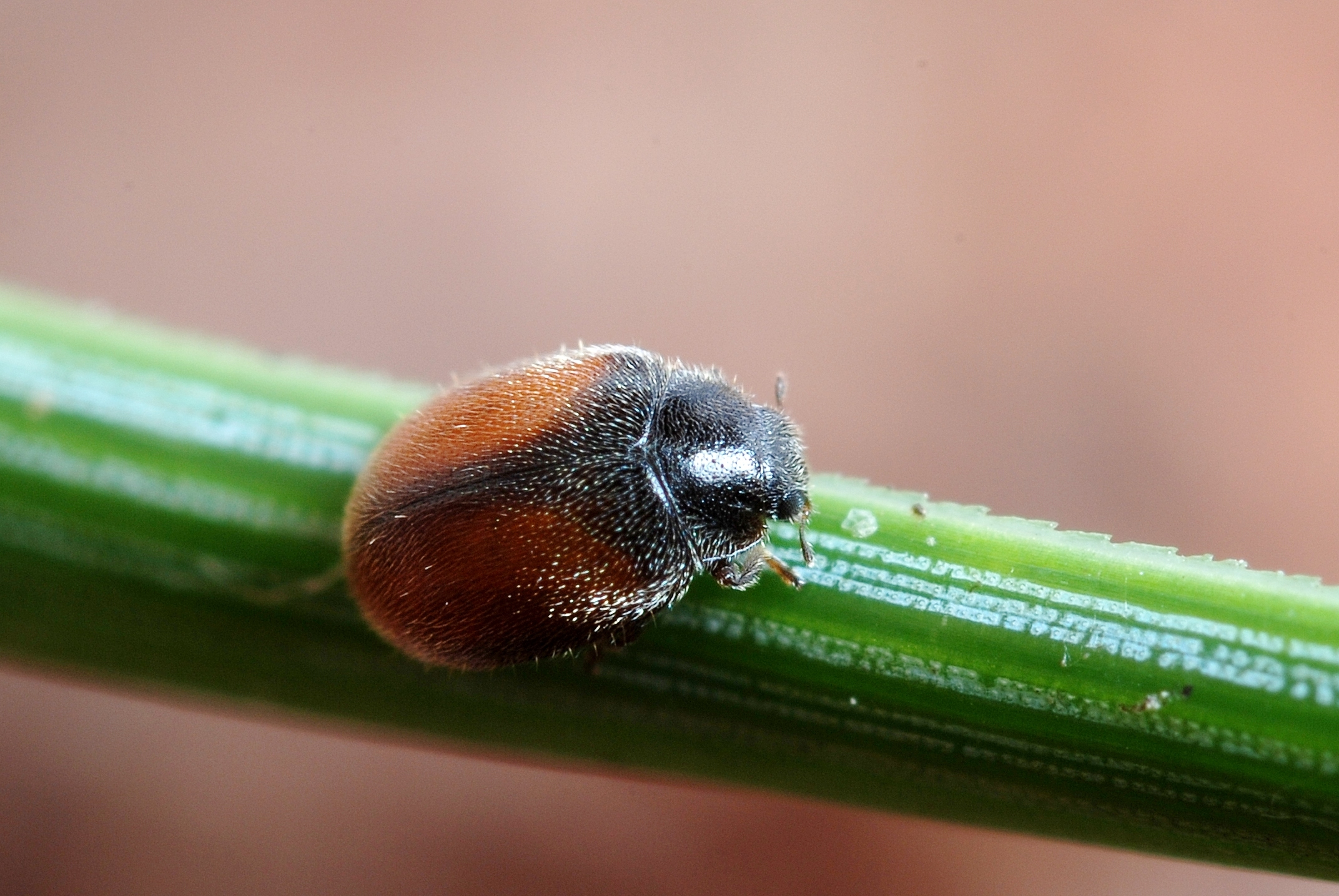

Scientific classification
- Kingdom: Animalia
- Phylum: Arthropoda
- Clade: Pancrustacea
- Class: Insecta
- Order: Coleoptera
- Suborder: Polyphaga
- Infraorder: Cucujiformia
- Family: Coccinellidae
- Genus: Scymnus
- Species: S. suturalis

Binomial name
- Scymnus suturalis Thunberg, 1795

Synonyms
- Coccinella pusilla Müller, 1776; Scymnus pilosus Herbst, 1797; Coccinella discoidea Illiger, 1798; Byrrhus pini Marsham, 1802; Coccinella plagiata Beck, 1817 (preocc.); Scymnus atriceps Stephens, 1832; Scymnus (Pullus) quercus Mulsant, 1850

= Scymnus suturalis =

Species of beetle

Scymnus suturalis is a species of beetle in family Coccinellidae. It is found in the Palearctic - Europe, North Africa, European Russia, the Caucasus, Siberia, the Russian Far East, Belarus, Ukraine, Moldova, Transcaucasia, Western Asia, Mongolia, North America (introduced to the United States).

It is a tiny (2mm. -2.5 2mm.) ladybird. The elytra which bear long, mainly backward-pointing hairs are red or chestnut brown usually with a dark brown mark behind the scutellum and extending along the median. It is common. In Central Europe it is a forest species which feeds on Coccoidea—it is associated with the scale Chionaspis salicis. S. suturalis occurs in conifer (especially Pinus sylvestris and other Pinus species) and mixed forests, also in marshes, gardens, and parks. In Russia and Poland, it feeds on Adelgidae and other aphids on Pinus, less frequently, on Betula pendula and other Betula species and Ligustrum vulgare. It was also found under flakes of bark, in moss on the trunks, and in the litter of coniferous trees.
