= Scymnus pictilis =

Scientific classification
- Kingdom: Animalia
- Phylum: Arthropoda
- Clade: Pancrustacea
- Class: Insecta
- Order: Coleoptera
- Suborder: Polyphaga
- Infraorder: Cucujiformia
- Family: Coccinellidae
- Genus: Scymnus
- Species: S. pictilis

Binomial name
- Scymnus pictilis Gordon, 2001

Species of beetle

Scymnus pictilis is a species of beetle of the family Coccinellidae. It is found in Argentina.

== Description ==
Adults reach a length of about 1.6–1.8 mm. Adults are light reddish brown, while the basomedian area of the pronotum is brown. The basal, lateral and sutural margins of the elytron have a brown border.

== Etymology ==
The species name is derived from Latin pictilis (meaning pictured or painted).
