= Scymnus fryi =

Scientific classification
- Kingdom: Animalia
- Phylum: Arthropoda
- Clade: Pancrustacea
- Class: Insecta
- Order: Coleoptera
- Suborder: Polyphaga
- Infraorder: Cucujiformia
- Family: Coccinellidae
- Genus: Scymnus
- Species: S. fryi

Binomial name
- Scymnus fryi Gordon, 2001

Species of beetle

Scymnus fryi is a species of beetle of the family Coccinellidae. It is found in Brazil.

== Description ==
Adults reach a length of about 1.9–2.0 mm. Adults are black. The apical one-eight of the elytron is reddish yellow.

== Etymology ==
The species is named for the collector of the holotype.
