= Scymnus indianensis =

Scientific classification
- Kingdom: Animalia
- Phylum: Arthropoda
- Clade: Pancrustacea
- Class: Insecta
- Order: Coleoptera
- Suborder: Polyphaga
- Infraorder: Cucujiformia
- Family: Coccinellidae
- Genus: Scymnus
- Species: S. indianensis

Binomial name
- Scymnus indianensis Weise, 1929

Synonyms
- Scymnus (Scymnus) rusticus Casey, 1899

Species of beetle

Scymnus indianensis, the Indiana lady beetle, is a species of dusky lady beetle in the family Coccinellidae. It is found in North America.
