= Scymnus tenuis =

Scientific classification
- Kingdom: Animalia
- Phylum: Arthropoda
- Clade: Pancrustacea
- Class: Insecta
- Order: Coleoptera
- Suborder: Polyphaga
- Infraorder: Cucujiformia
- Family: Coccinellidae
- Genus: Scymnus
- Species: S. tenuis

Binomial name
- Scymnus tenuis Yang, 1978

Synonyms
- Scymnus (Pullus) longisiphonulus Cao & Xiao, 1984; Scymnus (Pullus) longisiphonulus Pang & Gordon, 1986

Species of beetle

Scymnus tenuis is a species of beetle of the family Coccinellidae. It is found in Taiwan and China (Guangdong).

== Description ==
Adults reach a length of about 1.7–1.9 mm. They have a reddish brown head and pronotum. The elytron is dark brown with a yellowish brown apex.
