= Scymnus marginicollis =

Scientific classification
- Kingdom: Animalia
- Phylum: Arthropoda
- Clade: Pancrustacea
- Class: Insecta
- Order: Coleoptera
- Suborder: Polyphaga
- Infraorder: Cucujiformia
- Family: Coccinellidae
- Genus: Scymnus
- Species: S. marginicollis

Binomial name
- Scymnus marginicollis Mannerheim, 1843

Species of beetle

Scymnus marginicollis is a species of dusky lady beetle in the family Coccinellidae. It is found in North America.

== Subspecies ==
These two subspecies belong to the species Scymnus marginicollis:

- Scymnus marginicollis borealis Hatch
- Scymnus marginicollis marginicollis
