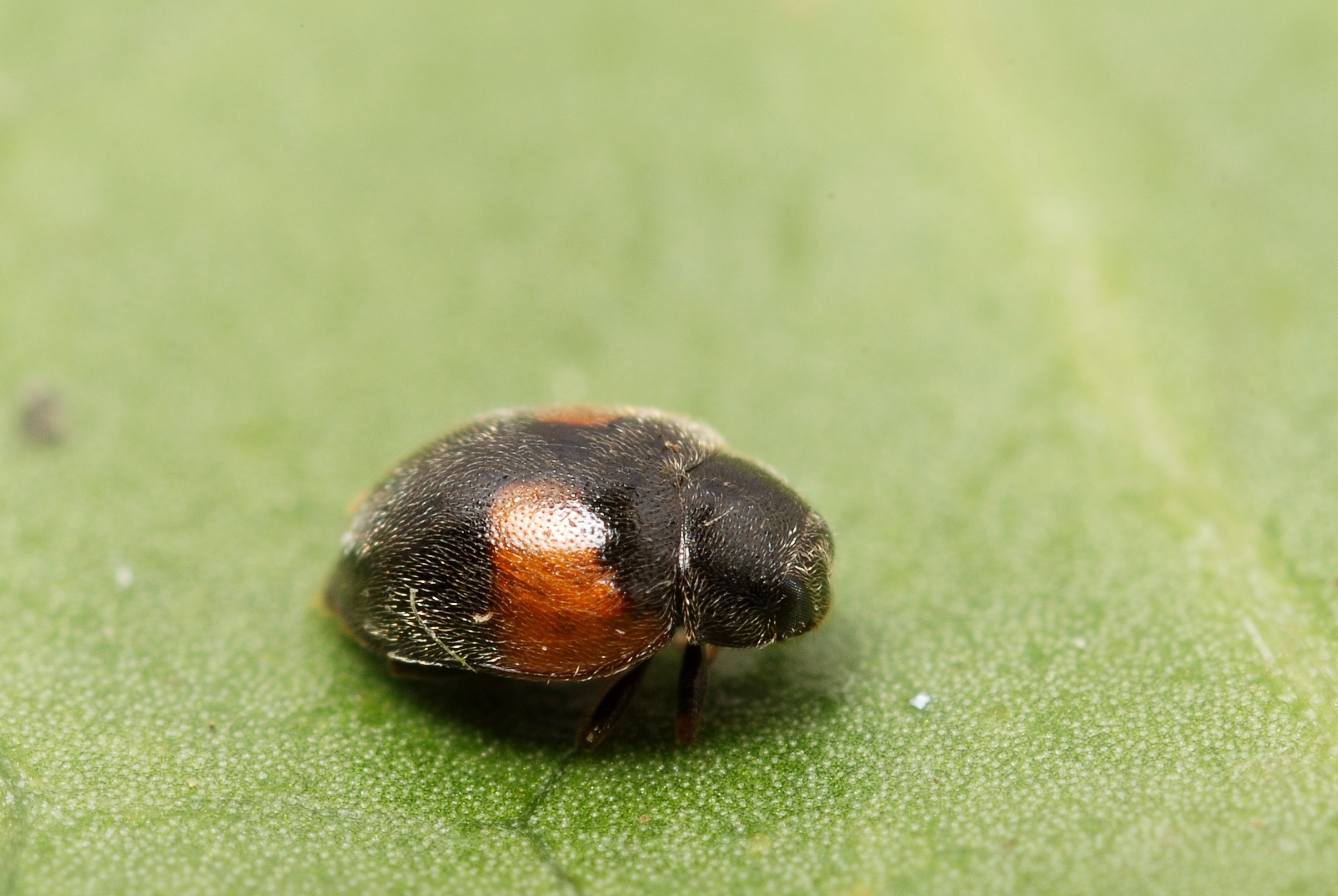

Scientific classification
- Kingdom: Animalia
- Phylum: Arthropoda
- Clade: Pancrustacea
- Class: Insecta
- Order: Coleoptera
- Suborder: Polyphaga
- Infraorder: Cucujiformia
- Family: Coccinellidae
- Genus: Scymnus
- Species: S. interruptus

Binomial name
- Scymnus interruptus (Goeze, 1777)

Synonyms
- Coccinella interrupta Goeze, 1777; Sphaeridium bimaculatum Herbst, 1792; Sphaeridium bipustulatum Thunberg, 1794; Coccinella morio Fabricius, 1801; Scymnus bimaculatus Motschulsky, 1837; Scymnus bilunulatus Motschulsky, 1837; Scymnus basalis Redtenbacher, 1843; Scymnus (Pullus) pallidivestis Mulsant, 1853; Pharus basalis Kirsch, 1871

= Scymnus interruptus =

Species of beetle

Scymnus interruptus is a species of beetle of the family Coccinellidae. This species is native to the West Palearctic region, but it was introduced into the United States as a biological control agent and then spread to other regions of the New World. It has been recorded in South America (Chile and Ecuador).
