= J. Gordon Edwards (entomologist) =

American entomologist

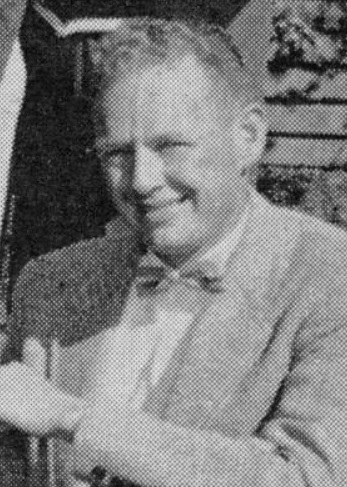
- Edwards circa 1956
- Born: August 24, 1919; Wilmington, Ohio
- Died: July 19, 2004 (aged 84); Glacier National Park
- Education: Butler University; Ohio State University
- Known for: DDT-advocacy; A Climber's Guide to Glacier National Park
- Scientific career
- Fields: Entomology
- Workplaces: San Jose State University
- Thesis: Taxonomy and bionomics of superfamily Scarabaeoidea in eastern half of United States (1949)

J. Gordon Edwards (August 24, 1919 – July 19, 2004) was an American entomologist and proponent of the use and safety of the pesticide DDT. He was professor of entomology at San Jose State University for 40 years, and namesake to the university's entomology museum. He was an outspoken critic of Rachel Carson and efforts to ban DDT, famously eating the substance to demonstrate its safety to humans. He was also a noted mountain climber, spending nine seasons as a ranger-naturalist in Glacier National Park during the 1940s and '50s, and returning often to collect insects and map routes. His 1961 book A Climber's Guide to Glacier National Park, republished several times since, made him known as the "patron saint of climbing" in the park, where he died while hiking, aged 84.

== Early life and education ==
J. Gordon Edwards was born on August 24, 1919, in Wilmington, Ohio, to parents Gus and Evadne Edwards (née Spears). He was named after the silent film director J. Gordon Edwards. He grew up in Indianapolis, Indiana, and joined the Boy Scouts at age 12. He studied botany at Butler University, Indiana, graduating in 1942, then enlisted in the United States Army during World War II, serving as a combat medic with the 95th Infantry Division in Europe. He wrote about eradicating bed bugs in the barracks, and dusting personnel with DDT to control body lice and prevent typhus. He was discharged from the military after the 1945 bombings of Hiroshima and Nagasaki, having spent nearly four years with the army.

His graduate education was at Ohio State University, where he earned his MS degree in 1946 and his PhD in Entomology in 1949. He also worked as an ornithological assistant to Donald J. Borror. At Ohio State he met Alice Althaus and they were married on October 13, 1946.

== Entomology ==
In 1949 Edwards joined the faculty of San Jose State University (then San Jose State College), where he was professor of entomology until his retirement in 1990, after which he continued research and teaching as professor emeritus. He specialized in beetles, and published several articles on the insects of Glacier National Park. He was elected a life fellow of the California Academy of Sciences in 1977, and served as president of the Pacific Coast Entomological Society in 1948 and 1953, elected as honorary member in 1993. During his career he supervised 90 master's students in entomology, including scientists such as Terry L. Erwin, who credits Edwards with inspiring his interest in entomology. To students and friends he was widely called "Doc". In 1991 the university's entomology museum was dedicated to him and renamed the J. Gordon Edwards Entomology Museum. He is commemorated in the scientific names of the beetles Bembidion edwardsi and Nebria arkansana edwardsi. Dr. Michael Ivie, past president of the Entomological Society of America, calls Edwards an "unsung mentor", writing that despite his influence he is little-known among entomologists beyond his students, a trait Ivie attributes to his teaching at a non-PhD granting university. In 2007 The Coleopterists Society established the annual J. Gordon Edwards Prize for the best published paper based on a Master's Thesis dealing with beetles.

== DDT and environmental issues ==
Edwards was a prominent supporter of the use of DDT and critic of Rachel Carson. He claimed that bans of DDT were not based on good science, and accused environmentalists of politicizing issues regarding pesticides.

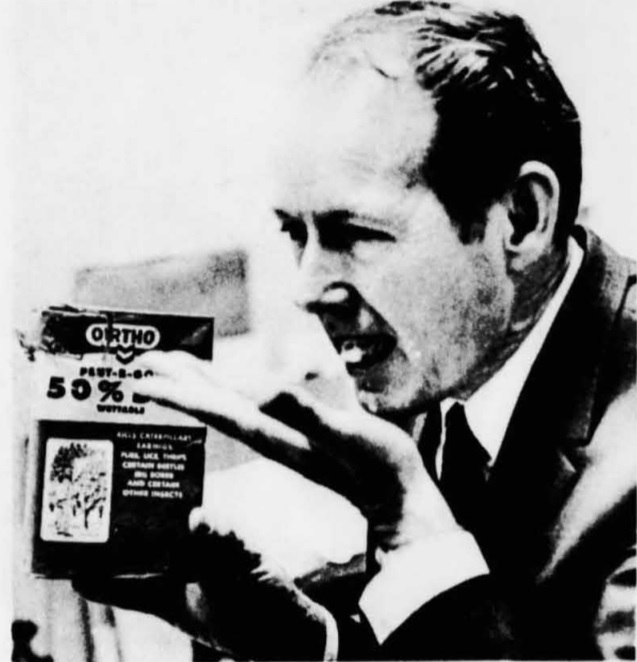
Edwards was known for eating DDT before lecturing on its safety.

He was active as a member of, or consultant for, a wide range of lobby groups opposed to environmental regulation, including the American Council on Science and Health. According to Edwards, he was also active as a member of several environmental groups, such as the Sierra Club (which published one of his books), and the Audubon Society. Edwards was a fellow of the California Academy of Sciences. He published his ideas in 21st Century Science and Technology, a publication of the Lyndon LaRouche Movement. Edwards last work, titled DDT: A Case Study in Scientific Fraud was published in 2004 after his death in the fringe partizan Journal of American Physicians and Surgeons, in which he makes the impassioned plea "The ban on DDT, founded on erroneous or fraudulent reports and imposed by one powerful bureaucrat, has caused millions of deaths, while sapping the strength and productivity of countless human beings in underdeveloped countries. It is time for an honest appraisal and for immediate deployment of the best currently available means to control insect-borne diseases. This means DDT."

In 1971 he gave testimony before the Congressional House Committee on Agriculture which was widely cited and circulated, despite having published no scientific papers on DDT or birds at the time.

In the 1970s Edwards was involved in a libel suit against the New York Times and the National Audubon Society. In April 1972, Robert Arbib Jr., the editor of the Society's American Birds journal, wrote in an editorial that representatives of pesticide industries and "paid 'scientist-spokesmen'" were misleadingly using data from Christmas Bird Count to claim that bird populations were increasing despite the usage of DDT, and that apparent increases in songbirds were the result of more birdwatchers rather than more birds. Arbib did not name any individuals in his article, but when contacted by the Times, said they included Edwards, Thomas H. Jukes, and Robert H. White-Stevens, among others. Edwards, Jukes, and White-Stevens sued the Times for libel, and in 1976 were awarded $61,000, a ruling that was overturned the following year by a Federal appeals court citing freedom of the press to report on public figures.

== Mountaineering ==
Edwards was a seasonal park ranger-naturalist in Glacier National Park for nine years beginning in 1947, and returned almost every summer in the years afterward for research. He spent much of his free time exploring the rugged terrain of the park, and pioneered many different routes up a variety of its spectacular mountains. In 1961 he produced A Climber's Guide to Glacier National Park, published by the Sierra Club, which quickly became a classic work, the definitive mountain guide to the park. I The book was revised and reprinted in the 1970s, 1990s, and as recently as 2017. In the foreword to its 1995 edition, Rolf Larson gave him the unofficial title of "patron saint of climbing" in the park. Ansel Adams personally gave Edwards permission to use his iconic photographs in the book. Edwards was also a founding member of the Glacier Mountaineering Society, a group that publishes an annual climbing journal and continues to be active in organizing hikes and climbs throughout the park.

On July 19, 2004, Edwards died of a heart attack at the age of 84 while hiking up Divide Mountain on the eastern edge of Glacier National Park with his wife, Alice. A memorial issue of the Glacier Park Foundation's newsletter called him "a legendary mountaineer and one of the most distinguished and famous figures in Glacier's history". He had a daughter, Jane who died in 2005, followed by his wife in 2015.

== Books ==
- Coleoptera or Beetles East of the Great Plains (1949) Edwards Bros. OCLC 977027546
- A Climber's Guide to Glacier National Park (1961) OCLC 480252
- Insects (with Matthew F. Vessel and Herbert H. Wong) (1971) Fearon. Western Environmental Science Series OCLC 1441270
