= Scymnus murilloi =

Scientific classification
- Kingdom: Animalia
- Phylum: Arthropoda
- Clade: Pancrustacea
- Class: Insecta
- Order: Coleoptera
- Suborder: Polyphaga
- Infraorder: Cucujiformia
- Family: Coccinellidae
- Genus: Scymnus
- Species: S. murilloi

Binomial name
- Scymnus murilloi Gordon, 2001

Species of beetle

Scymnus murilloi is a species of beetle of the family Coccinellidae. It is found in Colombia, Venezuela and Brazil.

== Description ==
Adults reach a length of about 2-2.4 mm. Adults are black, with the apical border and anterior angle of the pronotum and one-sixth of the elytron reddish brown.

== Etymology ==
The species is named for L. M. Murillo, a Colombian entomologist.
