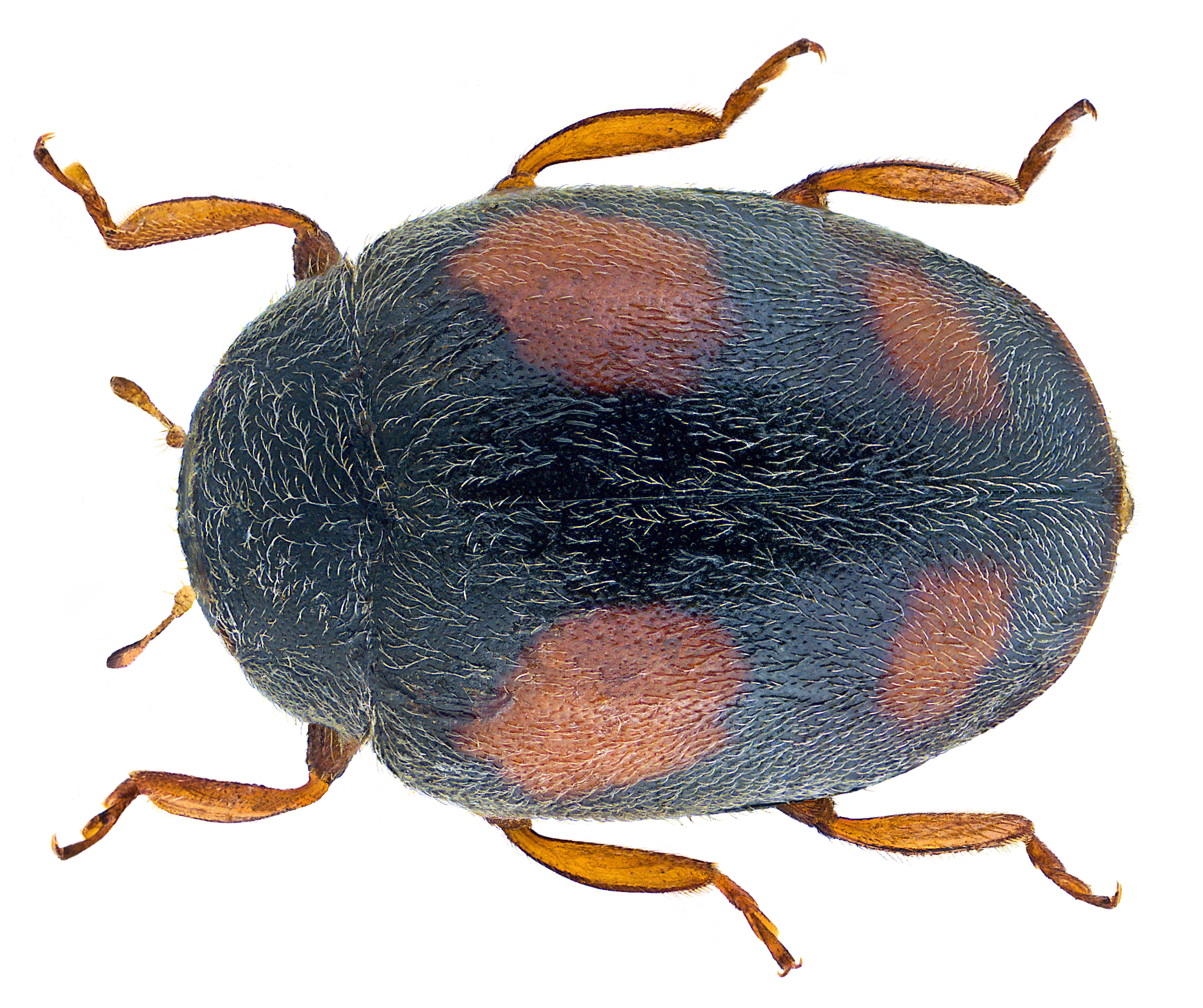
- Scymnus frontalis

Scientific classification
- Kingdom: Animalia
- Phylum: Arthropoda
- Clade: Pancrustacea
- Class: Insecta
- Order: Coleoptera
- Suborder: Polyphaga
- Infraorder: Cucujiformia
- Family: Coccinellidae
- Tribe: Coccidulini
- Genus: Scymnus; Kugelann, 1794

Synonyms
- Anisoscymnus Crotch, 1874; Didion Casey, 1899; Mimopullus Fürsch, 1987; Neopullus Sasaji, 1971; Nipponopullus Kamiya, 1961; Pullus Mulsant, 1846; Scymnomorpha Blackburn, 1892

= Scymnus (beetle) =

Genus of beetles

Scymnus is a genus of beetle in the family Coccinellidae. It is the type genus of the former subfamily Scymninae and the former tribe Scymnini.

== Subgenera ==
- Subgenus Caledonus Bielawski, 1973
  - Scymnus angusticollis Fauvel, 1903
- Subgenus Canalipullus Lafer, 2000
  - Scymnus kunashirensis Lafer, 2000
- Subgenus Didion Casey, 1899
  - Scymnus hoocalis Pang & Gordon, 1986
  - Scymnus longulum Casey, 1899
  - Scymnus nanum (LeConte, 1852)
  - Scymnus pirikamenoko Kamiya, 1961
  - Scymnus punctatum (Melsheimer, 1847)^{i c g b} (twice-stained ladybug)
- Subgenus Keiscymnus Sasaji, 1971
  - Scymnus kimon Kitano, 2012
  - Scymnus securiformis (Yu & Pang, 1992)
  - Scymnus tosaensis (Sasaji, 1971)
- Subgenus Mimopullus Fürsch, 1987
  - Scymnus cercyonides Wollaston, 1864
  - Scymnus epistemoides Wollaston, 1867
  - Scymnus fennicus Sahlberg, 1886
  - Scymnus flagellisiphonatus (Fürsch, 1970)
  - Scymnus fulvicollis Mulsant, 1846
  - Scymnus limnichoides Wollaston, 1854
  - Scymnus marinus (Mulsant, 1850)
  - Scymnus pharaonis Motschulsky, 1851
  - Scymnus sacium (Roubal, 1927)
- Subgenus Neopullus
- Subgenus Orthoscymnus Canepari, 1997
  - Scymnus crispatus Chen & Ren in Chen, Canepari, Wang & Ren, 2016
  - Scymnus duomaculatus Chen & Ren in Chen, Canepari, Wang & Ren, 2016
  - Scymnus jilongicus Chen & Ren in Chen, Canepari, Wang & Ren, 2016
  - Scymnus paradoxus Chen & Ren in Chen, Canepari, Wang & Ren, 2016
  - Scymnus rhododendri Canepari, 1997
  - Scymnus robustibasalis Yu in Yu et al. 2000
  - Scymnus smetanai Canepari, 1997
- Subgenus Parapullus
- Subgenus Pullus
- Subgenus Scymnus

== See also ==
- List of Scymnus species
