= Archegleis =

Scientific classification
- Kingdom: Animalia
- Phylum: Arthropoda
- Clade: Pancrustacea
- Class: Insecta
- Order: Coleoptera
- Suborder: Polyphaga
- Infraorder: Cucujiformia
- Family: Coccinellidae
- Subfamily: Coccidulinae
- Tribe: Coccidulini
- Genus: Archegleis; Iablokoff-Khnzorian, 1984

Genus of beetles

Archegleis is a genus of beetles belonging to the family Coccinellidae.

== Species ==
- Archegleis duplicata
- Archegleis edwardsii
- Archegleis interrupta
- Archegleis kingii
