= Scymnodes =

Scientific classification
- Kingdom: Animalia
- Phylum: Arthropoda
- Clade: Pancrustacea
- Class: Insecta
- Order: Coleoptera
- Suborder: Polyphaga
- Infraorder: Cucujiformia
- Family: Coccinellidae
- Subfamily: Coccidulinae
- Tribe: Coccidulini
- Genus: Scymnodes; Blackburn, 1889

Synonyms
- Scymnodes (Dolinus) Weise, 1923

Genus of beetles

Scymnodes is a genus of beetles belonging to the family Coccinellidae.

== Species ==
- Scymnodes aciculatus
- Scymnodes bellus
- Scymnodes consimilis
- Scymnodes difficilis
- Scymnodes fulvohirtus
- Scymnodes hirtus
- Scymnodes howdenorum
- Scymnodes koebeli
- Scymnodes laticollis
- Scymnodes luteohirtus
- Scymnodes magnus
- Scymnodes metallicus
- Scymnodes obscuricollis
- Scymnodes riedeli
- Scymnodes styx
