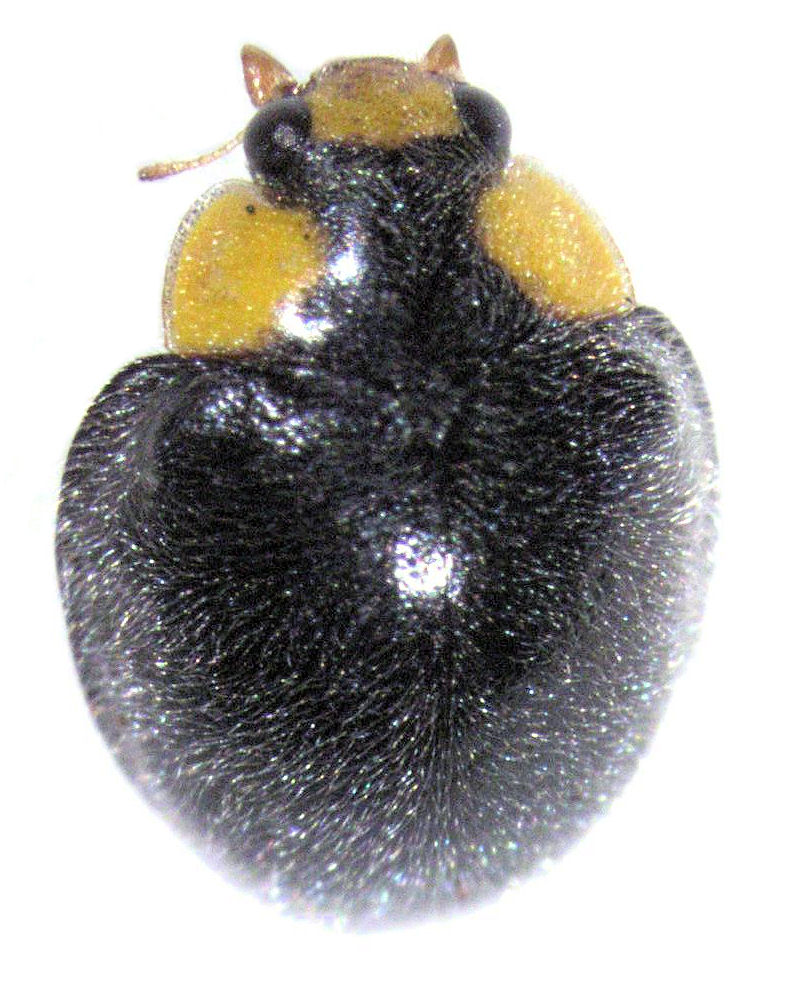
- Apolinus lividigaster

Scientific classification
- Kingdom: Animalia
- Phylum: Arthropoda
- Clade: Pancrustacea
- Class: Insecta
- Order: Coleoptera
- Suborder: Polyphaga
- Infraorder: Cucujiformia
- Family: Coccinellidae
- Subfamily: Coccidulinae
- Tribe: Coccidulini
- Genus: Apolinus; Pope & Lawrence, 1990

Synonyms
- Platyomus Mulsant, 1853 (preocc.); Scymnodes (Apolinus)

= Apolinus =

Genus of beetles

Apolinus is a genus of beetles belonging to the family Coccinellidae.

== Species ==
- Apolinus cribratus
- Apolinus irian
- Apolinus jaya
- Apolinus lividigaster
- Apolinus longicornis
- Apolinus rotundus
- Apolinus terminalis
