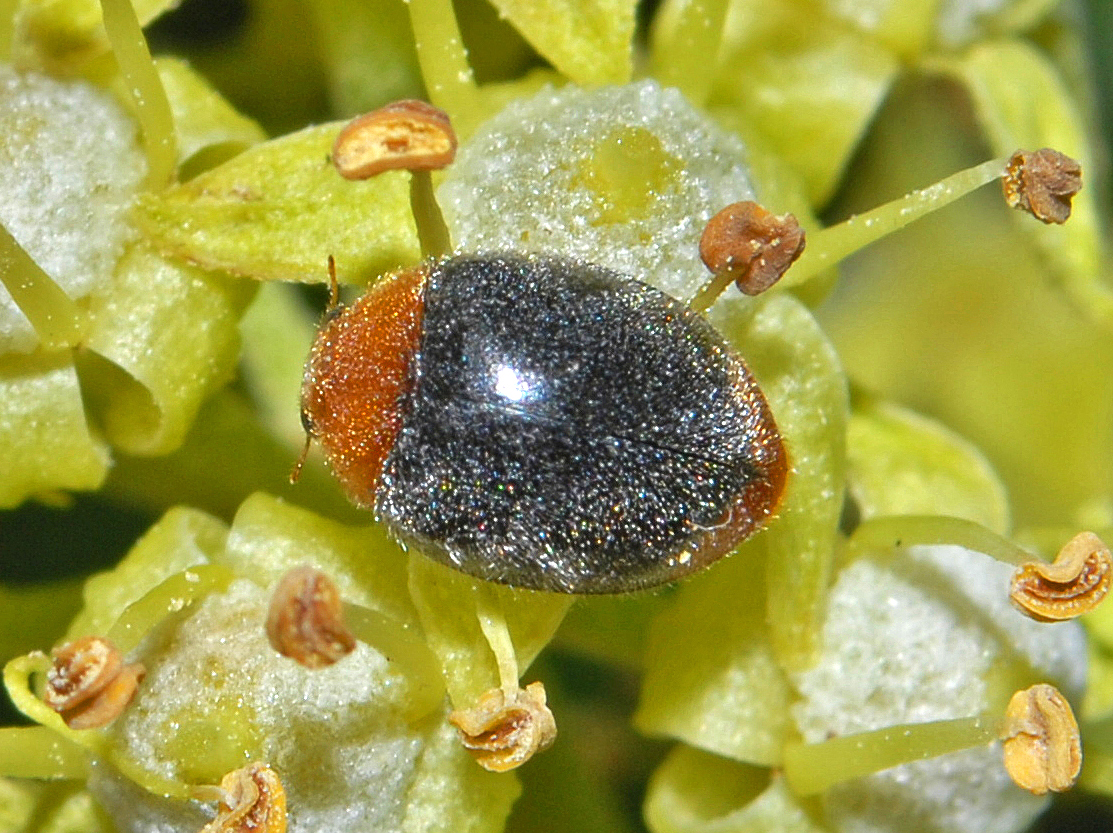
- Cryptolaemus montrouzieri

Scientific classification
- Kingdom: Animalia
- Phylum: Arthropoda
- Clade: Pancrustacea
- Class: Insecta
- Order: Coleoptera
- Suborder: Polyphaga
- Infraorder: Cucujiformia
- Family: Coccinellidae
- Subfamily: Coccidulinae
- Tribe: Coccidulini
- Genus: Cryptolaemus; Mulsant, 1853

Species
- See text

= Cryptolaemus =

Genus of beetles

The genus Cryptolaemus consists of predatory beetles of the family Coccinellidae, whose larvae and adults mostly prey upon scale insects on ornamental plants.

== Taxonomy ==
There are several species in the genus, in two groups, all originally from eastern Australia, New Guinea, and Indonesia. Of these, Cryptolaemus montrouzieri Mulsant, 1850 is the most well-known.

== Species ==
- Cryptolaemus affinis
- Cryptolaemus ambiguus
- Cryptolaemus asymmetricus
- Cryptolaemus atratus
- Cryptolaemus bicolor
- Cryptolaemus concinnus
- Cryptolaemus crotchi
- Cryptolaemus distinctus
- Cryptolaemus dualis
- Cryptolaemus dubius
- Cryptolaemus fraternus
- Cryptolaemus gressitti
- Cryptolaemus guineensis
- Cryptolaemus incertus
- Cryptolaemus incrassatus
- Cryptolaemus iodes
- Cryptolaemus magnificus
- Cryptolaemus metallicus
- Cryptolaemus montrouzieri
- Cryptolaemus parvus
- Cryptolaemus prominens
- Cryptolaemus pulchellus
- Cryptolaemus purpureus
- Cryptolaemus regalis
- Cryptolaemus riedeli
- Cryptolaemus robustus
- Cryptolaemus sedlaceki
- Cryptolaemus sigmoidus
- Cryptolaemus similis
- Cryptolaemus simulatus
- Cryptolaemus sinestria
- Cryptolaemus splendens
- Cryptolaemus splendidus
- Cryptolaemus subviolaceus
- Cryptolaemus tetrahedron
- Cryptolaemus trochanteratus
- Cryptolaemus typicus
- Cryptolaemus wallacii
