= Epipleuria =

Scientific classification
- Kingdom: Animalia
- Phylum: Arthropoda
- Clade: Pancrustacea
- Class: Insecta
- Order: Coleoptera
- Suborder: Polyphaga
- Infraorder: Cucujiformia
- Family: Coccinellidae
- Subfamily: Coccidulinae
- Tribe: Coccidulini
- Genus: Epipleuria; Fürsch, 2001

Type species
- Rhyzobius epipleuralis Pope, 1957

Diversity
- 24 species

Genus of beetles

Epipleuria is a genus in the lady beetle family (Coccinellidae). It belongs to tribe Coccidulini of subfamily Coccidulinae, which is sometimes subsumed in the Coccinellinae as a tribe with the Coccidulini downranked to subtribe. As of 2005, two dozen species are known, all from the southern half of Africa.

The genus was only established in 2001, with the discovery of a number of beetles closely related to "Rhyzobius" epipleuralis but not actually part of the genus Rhyzobius.

== Species ==
As of 2005, the species of Epipleuria are:

- Epipleuria caputabdita Fürsch, 2007
- Epipleuria endroedyi Fürsch, 2001
- Epipleuria epipleuralis (Pope, 1957)
- Epipleuria globosa Fürsch, 2001
- Epipleuria gussmannae Fürsch, 2001
- Epipleuria hirsutula Fürsch, 2007
- Epipleuria hirta Fürsch, 2007
- Epipleuria inexspectata Fürsch, 2001
- Epipleuria katbergensis Fürsch, 2001
- Epipleuria lapidaria Fürsch, 2007
- Epipleuria longissima Fürsch, 2001
- Epipleuria mahnerti Fürsch, 2001
- Epipleuria namaquaensis Fürsch, 2001
- Epipleuria natalensis Fürsch, 2001
- Epipleuria parcepunctata Fürsch, 2001
- Epipleuria parva Fürsch, 2001
- Epipleuria popei Fürsch, 2001
- Epipleuria punctillum Fürsch, 2001
- Epipleuria rufosuturalis Fürsch, 2001
- Epipleuria rugata Fürsch, 2007
- Epipleuria ruthmuellerae Fürsch, 2007
- Epipleuria saxicola Fürsch, 2007
- Epipleuria trianguliloba Fürsch, 2001
- Epipleuria ventricosa Fürsch, 2001
