= Pseudoepipleuria =

Scientific classification
- Kingdom: Animalia
- Phylum: Arthropoda
- Clade: Pancrustacea
- Class: Insecta
- Order: Coleoptera
- Suborder: Polyphaga
- Infraorder: Cucujiformia
- Family: Coccinellidae
- Subfamily: Coccidulinae
- Tribe: Coccidulini
- Genus: Pseudoepipleuria; Czerwiński & Szawaryn, 2025

Genus of beetles

Pseudoepipleuria is a genus of beetles belonging to the family Scarabaeidae.

== Species ==
- Pseudoepipleuria endroedyi (Fürsch, 2001)
- Pseudoepipleuria mahnerti (Fürsch, 2001)
- Pseudoepipleuria stillata (Fürsch, 1992)
