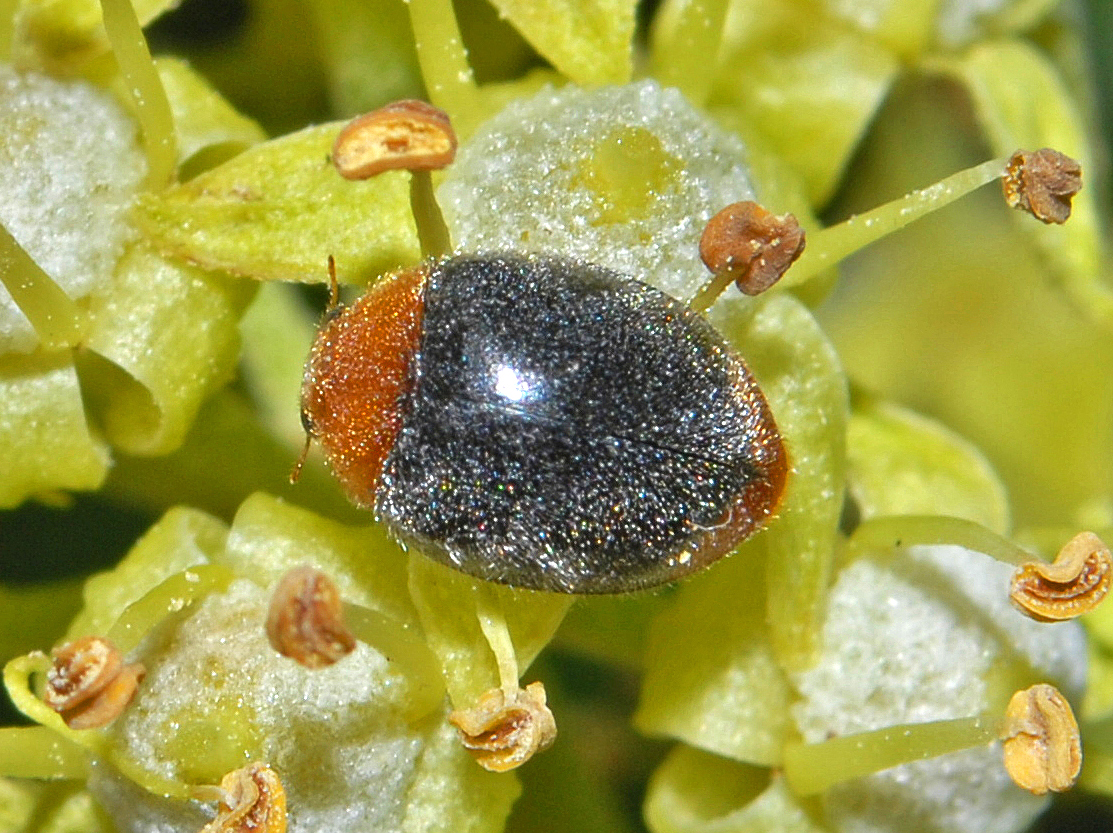
- Cryptolaemus montrouzieri. Dorsal view
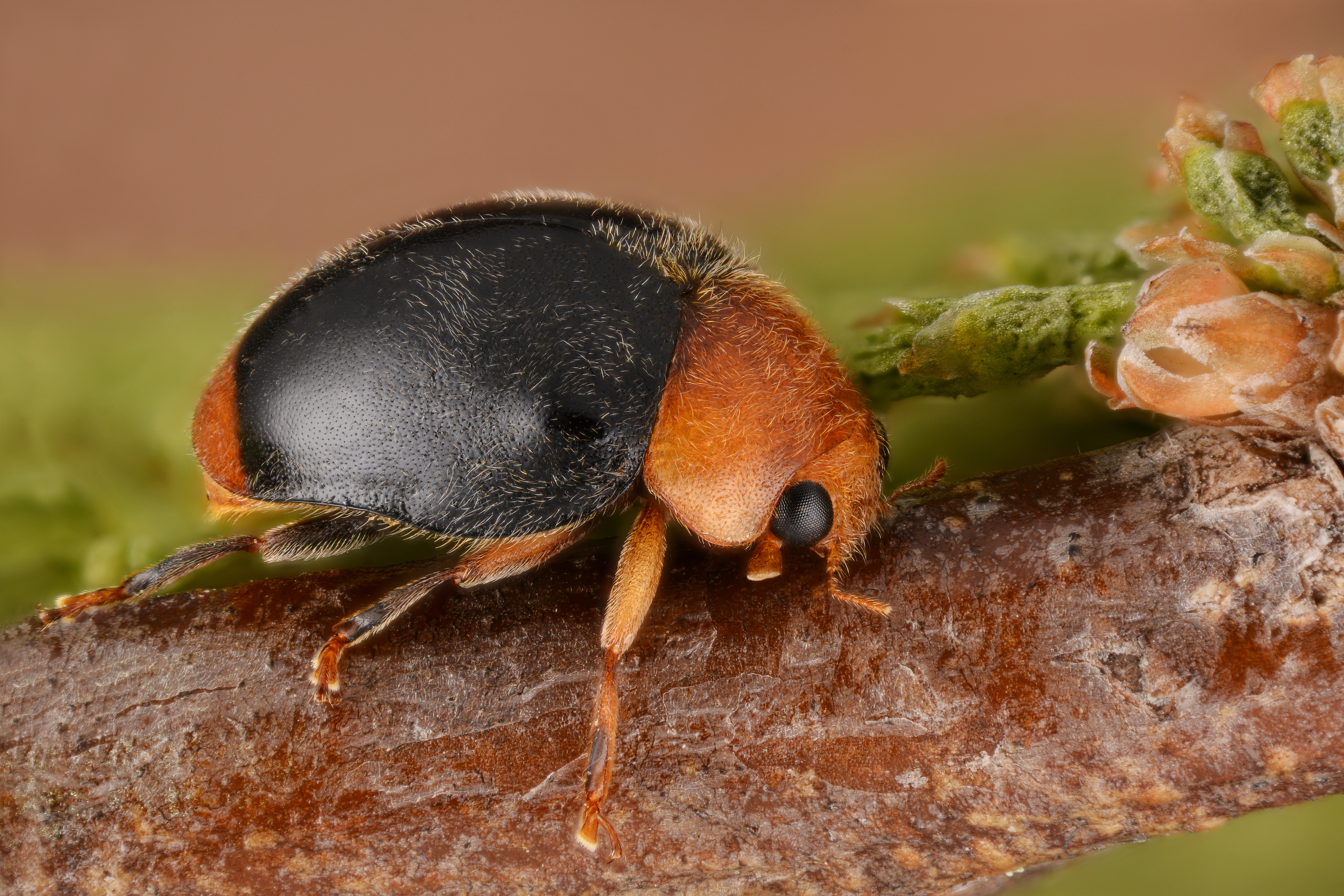
- Side view

Scientific classification
- Kingdom: Animalia
- Phylum: Arthropoda
- Clade: Pancrustacea
- Class: Insecta
- Order: Coleoptera
- Suborder: Polyphaga
- Infraorder: Cucujiformia
- Family: Coccinellidae
- Genus: Cryptolaemus
- Species: C. montrouzieri

Binomial name
- Cryptolaemus montrouzieri Mulsant, 1850

Synonyms
- Cryptolaemus simplex Blackburn, 1889; Cryptolaemus montrouzieri simplex

= Cryptolaemus montrouzieri =

Beetle that eats pest mealybugs

Cryptolaemus montrouzieri, common name mealybug ladybird or mealybug destroyer, is a species of ladybird beetle native to eastern Australia. The beetle feeds on mealybugs and other scale insects, and is used to control those pests on citrus orchards worldwide.

== Etymology ==
Étienne Mulsant described C. montrouzieri, naming the new species after a Marist brother and missionary, Abbe Montrouzier, who wrote an "Insect Fauna of Woodlark Island".

== Distribution ==
Cryptolaemus montrouzieri is endemic to Queensland and New South Wales, Australia. It is now also present in Europe (France, Italy, Spain, Greece, Cyprus and as far as Northern Germany), in North Africa, in the Afrotropical realm, in the Nearctic realm, and in the Neotropical realm.

== Description ==
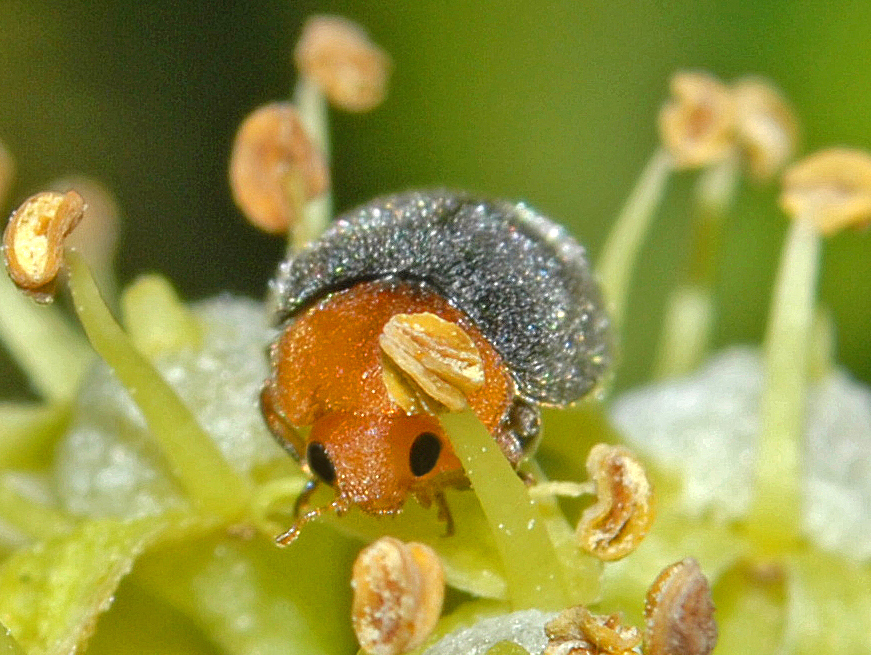
Front view

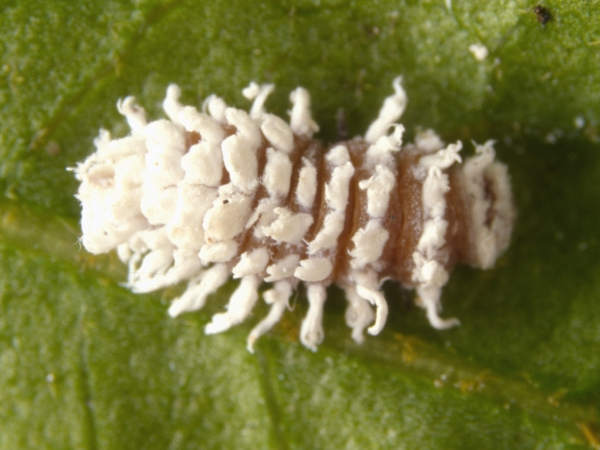
Cryptolaemus montrouzieri larva

Cryptolaemus montrouzieri can reach a length of about 6 millimetres (0.24 in). Adults of this species have the typical ladybird shape but, unlike many of the often brightly coloured Coccinellidae, the elytra of these small ladybirds are predominantly dark brown and have no spots. Head, antennae, pronotum, the end of the elytra and the legs are orange-brown. Larvae can reach a length of 14–15 millimetres (0.55–0.59 in). They show a waxy covering that makes them apparently look like the mealybugs they prey on, a case of aggressive mimicry.

== Biology ==
The adults and larvae of these insects eat scale insects, especially mealybugs. Females lay their eggs among the egg sac of mealybugs. Larvae feed on mealybug eggs, young crawlers and their honeydew. They become adults in 24 days, after four larval stages and a pupal stage. The life span is two months.

== Biological control agent ==
This species has been used as a biological control agent against mealybugs and other scale insects. It was introduced to Western Australia. In California it was introduced in 1891 by Albert Koebele to control the citrus mealybug. It has also been introduced to New Zealand for biocontrol. As biological control agent outside Australia, C. montrouzieri has the common name Mealy bug destroyer. C. montrouzieri predates on mealybug and soft scale insect parasites of Araucaria cunninghamii, and can be easily handled without dying or becoming inactive, making it a good biocontrol for use in plantations. Although they are less interested in other trees – by many multiples – they do hunt the same pests in custard apple and citrus plantations.

== See also ==
- Hoangus venustus (a native New Zealand species which also feeds on mealybugs)

== General and cited references ==
- Chako, M.K., P. Bhatt, L.V. Rao, A. Deepak Singh, M.B.E.P. Ramnarayana and K. Sreedharan, 1978. "The use of the lady bird beetle (Cryptolaemus montrouzieri Mulsant) for the control of coffee mealybug". Journal of Coffee Research 8: 14–19
- Crowe, A. Which New Zealand Insect?. Auckland, N.Z.: Penguin Books, 2002. p. 47
- Gordon, Robert D. (1985). "The Coccinellidae (Coleoptera) of America North of Mexico", Journal of the New York Entomological Society, vol. 93, no. 1
- Korschefsky, R. / Schenkling, S., ed. (1931) Coccinellidae I, Coleopterorum Catalogus, Pars 118
- Mineo, G., 1967. "Cryptolaemus montrouzieri, Observations on morphology and bionomics". Bulletin of the Institute of Entomology and Agriculture 6: 99–143.
- Murthy, M.S., 1982. Studies on the biology and habits of Cryptolaemus montrouzieri Mulsant (Coccinellidae: Coleoptera). MSc (Agriculture) Thesis, Andhra Pradesh Agricultural University, Hyderabad, India.
- Ramesh, T., BabuK. M. Azam. "Biology of Cryptolaemus montrouzieri Mulsant [Coccinellidae: Coleoptera] in relation with temperature". Entomophaga (1987) 32: 381.
- Ślipiński, A. "Australian Ladybird Beetles (Coleoptera: Coccinellidae) Their biology and classification". Australian Biological Resources, 2007, p. 94.
