= Rodatus =

Scientific classification
- Kingdom: Animalia
- Phylum: Arthropoda
- Clade: Pancrustacea
- Class: Insecta
- Order: Coleoptera
- Suborder: Polyphaga
- Infraorder: Cucujiformia
- Family: Coccinellidae
- Subfamily: Coccidulinae
- Tribe: Coccidulini
- Genus: Rodatus; Mulsant, 1850

Genus of ladybirds

Rodatus is a genus of ladybirds native to Australia.
