= Axinoscymnus puttarudriahi =

Scientific classification
- Kingdom: Animalia
- Phylum: Arthropoda
- Clade: Pancrustacea
- Class: Insecta
- Order: Coleoptera
- Suborder: Polyphaga
- Infraorder: Cucujiformia
- Family: Coccinellidae
- Genus: Axinoscymnus
- Species: A. puttarudriahi

Binomial name
- Axinoscymnus puttarudriahi Kapur and Munshi, 1965

Species of beetle

Axinoscymnus puttarudriahi, is a species of lady beetle native to India and Sri Lanka.

== Description ==
Body length is about 1 to 2 mm. Body brownish. Elytra hairy with black patches.

== Biology ==
Adult lady beetles can be used to control the whitefly species Aleurothrixus trachoides that infesting Capsicum annuum. It is also a major predator of Aleurodicus dispersus that attack banana plantations, guava and Bemisia tabaci on chillie and star gooseberry. Adults usually feed on the eggs of the whitefly. In Sri Lanka, it is known to feed on two major pests, Aphis gossypii and Myzus persicae.

The peak abundance of the beetle has observed in the months of September to October.
