= Gordonita =

Scientific classification
- Kingdom: Animalia
- Phylum: Arthropoda
- Clade: Pancrustacea
- Class: Insecta
- Order: Coleoptera
- Suborder: Polyphaga
- Infraorder: Cucujiformia
- Family: Coccinellidae
- Subfamily: Coccidulinae
- Tribe: Coccidulini
- Genus: Gordonita; González, 2013

Genus of beetles

Gordonita is a genus of beetles belonging to the family Coccinellidae.

== Species ==
- Gordonita anomala González, 2013
- Gordonita guillermoi Churata & Almeida, 2026
- Gordonita norae Churata & Almeida, 2026
- Gordonita tijeoi Churata & Almeida, 2026
