= Axinoscymnus =

Scientific classification
- Kingdom: Animalia
- Phylum: Arthropoda
- Clade: Pancrustacea
- Class: Insecta
- Order: Coleoptera
- Suborder: Polyphaga
- Infraorder: Cucujiformia
- Family: Coccinellidae
- Tribe: Coccidulini
- Genus: Axinoscymnus; Kamiya, 1963

Genus of insects

Axinoscymnus is a genus of beetles belonging to the family Coccinellidae.

== Species ==
- Axinoscymnus apioides
- Axinoscymnus beneficus
- Axinoscymnus cardilobus
- Axinoscymnus fumatus
- Axinoscymnus glotticus
- Axinoscymnus gongxinensis
- Axinoscymnus hamulatus
- Axinoscymnus macrosiphonatus
- Axinoscymnus navicularis
- Axinoscymnus nigripennis
- Axinoscymnus pingxiangicus
- Axinoscymnus puttarudriahi
- Axinoscymnus rai
- Axinoscymnus singaporicus
