= Scymnodes koebeli =

Scientific classification
- Kingdom: Animalia
- Phylum: Arthropoda
- Clade: Pancrustacea
- Class: Insecta
- Order: Coleoptera
- Suborder: Polyphaga
- Infraorder: Cucujiformia
- Family: Coccinellidae
- Genus: Scymnodes
- Species: S. koebeli

Binomial name
- Scymnodes koebeli Blackburn, 1892

Synonyms
- Platyomus baccaeformis Blackburn, 1895; Scymnodes (Dolinus) fulvipes Weise, 1923; Scymnodes (Dolinus) maculiger Weise, 1923; Scymnodes (Dolinus) tristis Weise, 1923; Scymnodes koebeli var. eugeniae Blackburn, 1892; Scymnodes koebeli var. immaculatus Blackburn, 1892

Species of beetle

Scymnodes koebeli is a species of beetle of the family Coccinellidae. It is found in Australia (Queensland, New South Wales, Victoria).

== Description ==
Adults reach a length of about 2.5–4 mm (0.098–0.157 in). They have an elongate to broad oval to subrounded, moderately to strongly convex body. It is a very variable species. The head is yellowish-testaceous, while the pronotum ranges from completely black, black with yellowish-testaceous margins or even completely yellowish-testaceous or yellow with black markings. The elytra are very variable, ranging from black, black with reddish-testaceous areas, black with a two reddish to orange-yellow spots or with a large discal black patch leaving only the lateral margins yellowish-testaceous. The ventral surface is yellowish-testaceous to black.

== Life history ==
They have been recorded feeding on various scale insects, including Eriococcus leptospermi, Chionaspis eugeniae, Aspidiotus cyncarpiae, Fiorinia species, Chrysomphalus aonidum, Coccus viridis and Coccus hesperidum.
