= Gordonita guillermoi =

Scientific classification
- Kingdom: Animalia
- Phylum: Arthropoda
- Clade: Pancrustacea
- Class: Insecta
- Order: Coleoptera
- Suborder: Polyphaga
- Infraorder: Cucujiformia
- Family: Coccinellidae
- Genus: Gordonita
- Species: G. guillermoi

Binomial name
- Gordonita guillermoi Churata & Almeida, 2026

Species of beetle

Gordonita guillermoi is a species of beetle of the family Coccinellidae. It is found in Bolivia.

== Description ==
Adults reach a length of about 2.99–3.1 mm (0.118–0.122 in) for males and 2.97–3.3 mm (0.117–0.130 in) for females. They have a rounded body with thin, short and yellowish pubescence. The integument is yellow with larger black spots. The head is black, with the antennae and mouthparts yellowish. The pronotum is yellow, with a central piriform black spot. The scutellar shield is black and each elytron is yellow with one large, diffuse black spot. The legs have brownish femora, yellowish tibiae with sharp angulation on the outer edge, and bifid claws.

== Etymology ==
The species is named in honour of the Chilean entomologist Guillermo González.
