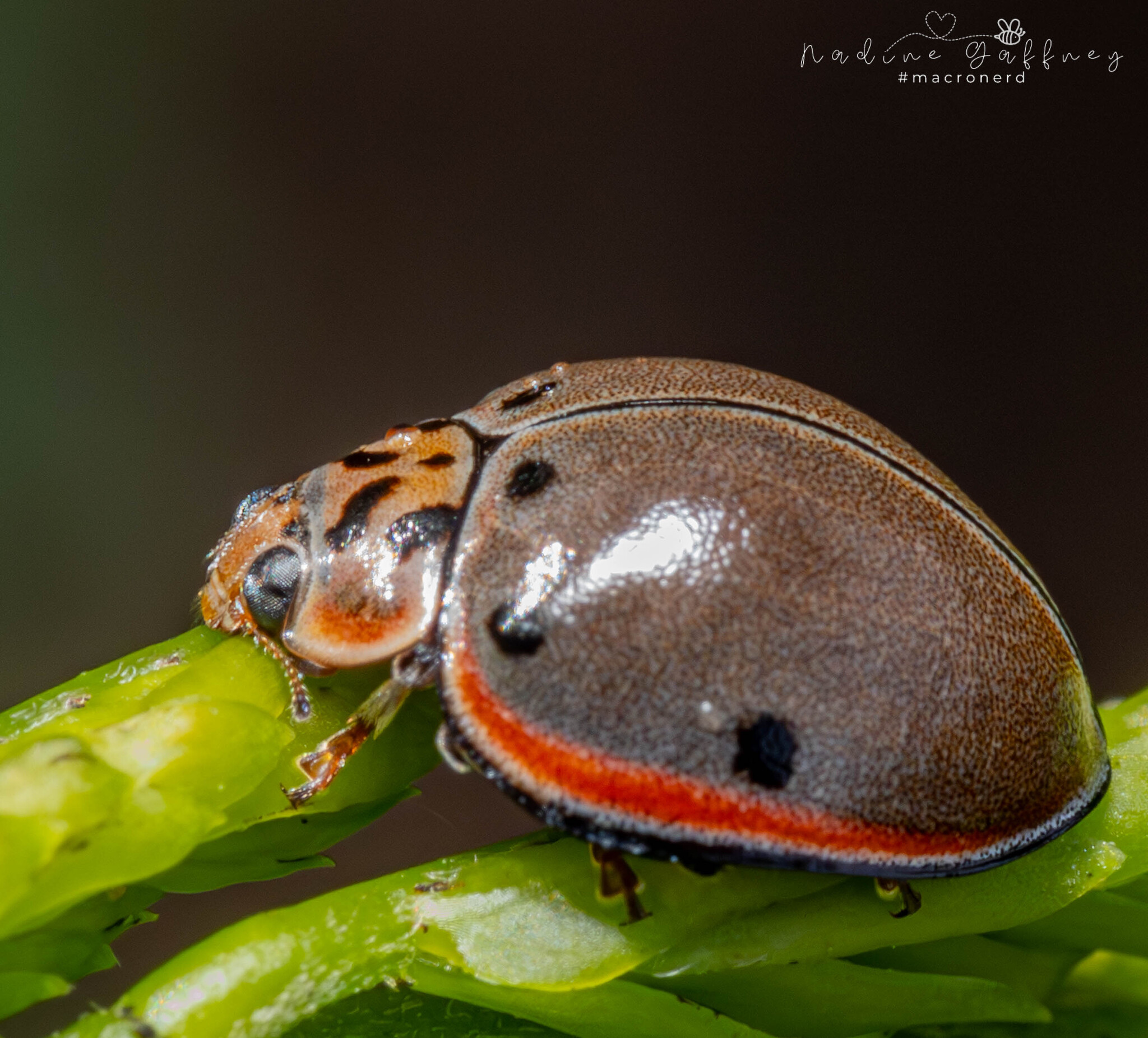

Scientific classification
- Kingdom: Animalia
- Phylum: Arthropoda
- Clade: Pancrustacea
- Class: Insecta
- Order: Coleoptera
- Suborder: Polyphaga
- Infraorder: Cucujiformia
- Family: Coccinellidae
- Genus: Archegleis
- Species: A. kingii

Binomial name
- Archegleis kingii (Macleay, 1827)

Synonyms
- Coccinella kingii Macleay, 1827; Egleis varicolor Mulsant, 1850

= Archegleis kingii =

Species of beetle

Archegleis kingii is a species of beetle of the family Coccinellidae. It is found in Australia (north-eastern Queensland, northern New South Wales).

== Description ==
Adults reach a length of about 4.8–7.3 mm (0.19–0.29 in). The head is yellow with two transverse black markings. The pronotum is pale yellow with four or five black markings and the scutellum is black with a pale area at the base. The elytra are creamy-yellow with a reddish stripe along the lateral border and three black spots and black borders. The ventral surface is mostly yellow.
