= Pseudoazya trinitatis =

Scientific classification
- Kingdom: Animalia
- Phylum: Arthropoda
- Clade: Pancrustacea
- Class: Insecta
- Order: Coleoptera
- Suborder: Polyphaga
- Infraorder: Cucujiformia
- Family: Coccinellidae
- Genus: Pseudoazya
- Species: P. trinitatis

Binomial name
- Pseudoazya trinitatis (Marshall, 1912)

Synonyms
- Azya trinitatis Marshall, 1912

Species of beetle

Pseudoazya trinitatis is a species of beetle of the family Coccinellidae. It is found in Trinidad.

== Description ==
Adults reach a length of about 2.35-2.65 mm. They have a greenish black head and pronotum, while the elytron is bluish black.
