= Pseudoryssomus =

Scientific classification
- Kingdom: Animalia
- Phylum: Arthropoda
- Clade: Pancrustacea
- Class: Insecta
- Order: Coleoptera
- Suborder: Polyphaga
- Infraorder: Cucujiformia
- Family: Coccinellidae
- Tribe: Coccidulini
- Genus: Pseudoryssomus; Gordon, 1974

Genus of insects

Pseudoryssomus is a genus of beetles belonging to the family Coccinellidae.

== Species ==
- Pseudoryssomus brevipilosus Gordon, 1974
- Pseudoryssomus brulei Almeida & Santos, 2014
- Pseudoryssomus crucifer Almeida & Santos, 2014
- Pseudoryssomus formosus Gordon, 1974
- Pseudoryssomus pumilus Gordon, 1974
- Pseudoryssomus rufomarginatus Almeida & Santos, 2014
- Pseudoryssomus triangulus Almeida & Santos, 2014
