= Scymnodes luteohirtus =

Scientific classification
- Kingdom: Animalia
- Phylum: Arthropoda
- Clade: Pancrustacea
- Class: Insecta
- Order: Coleoptera
- Suborder: Polyphaga
- Infraorder: Cucujiformia
- Family: Coccinellidae
- Genus: Scymnodes
- Species: S. luteohirtus

Binomial name
- Scymnodes luteohirtus Poorani & Ślipiński, 2009

Species of beetle

Scymnodes luteohirtus is a species of beetle of the family Coccinellidae. It is found in Australia (Queensland).

== Description ==
Adults reach a length of about 2.5 mm (0.098 in). They have a broad and short oval, convex body. The dorsal surface is black and covered with silvery white pubescence on the head and elytra, while the pubescence on the pronotum is bright yellowish. The ventral surface is black, but the antennae are lighter and testaceous.

== Etymology ==
The name of the species refers to the bright yellow pubescence on the pronotum.
