= Eupalea reticularis =

Scientific classification
- Kingdom: Animalia
- Phylum: Arthropoda
- Clade: Pancrustacea
- Class: Insecta
- Order: Coleoptera
- Suborder: Polyphaga
- Infraorder: Cucujiformia
- Family: Coccinellidae
- Genus: Eupalea
- Species: E. reticularis

Binomial name
- Eupalea reticularis González, 2015

Species of beetle

Eupalea reticularis is a species of beetle of the family Coccinellidae. It is found in Ecuador.

== Description ==
Adults reach a length of about 3.8 mm. Adults a shiny metallic green head and a pale yellow pronotum with a large black spot, which encloses two small yellow spots. The elytron is black with five large pale yellow spots.
