= Slipinskiscymnus pallidicollis =

Scientific classification
- Kingdom: Animalia
- Phylum: Arthropoda
- Clade: Pancrustacea
- Class: Insecta
- Order: Coleoptera
- Suborder: Polyphaga
- Infraorder: Cucujiformia
- Family: Coccinellidae
- Genus: Slipinskiscymnus
- Species: S. pallidicollis

Binomial name
- Slipinskiscymnus pallidicollis (Mulsant, 1853)

Synonyms
- Scymnus (Pullus) pallidicollis Mulsant, 1853; Pseudoscymnus pallidicollis; Keiscymnus taiwanensis Yang & Wu, 1972; Scymnus (Pullus) sternitus Pang & Gordon, 1986

Species of beetle

Slipinskiscymnus pallidicollis is a species of beetle of the family Coccinellidae. It is found in Mauritius, India, Taiwan, China, the Philippines and Thailand.

== Description ==
Adults reach a length of about 1.4 mm. They have a yellow head and pronotum. The elytron is piceous with the apical one-third yellow.

== Biology ==
It preys on Phenacoccus hirsutus.
