= Zilus horni =

Scientific classification
- Kingdom: Animalia
- Phylum: Arthropoda
- Clade: Pancrustacea
- Class: Insecta
- Order: Coleoptera
- Suborder: Polyphaga
- Infraorder: Cucujiformia
- Family: Coccinellidae
- Genus: Zilus
- Species: Z. horni

Binomial name
- Zilus horni Gordon, 1985

Species of beetle

Zilus horni is a species of lady beetle in the family Coccinellidae. It is found in North America, where it has been recorded from Maryland to Florida, west to Wisconsin. It has also been recorded from Louisiana.

== Description ==
Adults reach a length of about 1.40-1.60 mm. They have a black body, while the antennae, mouthparts and legs are yellowish brown.

== Etymology ==
The species is named in honour of George H. Horn.
