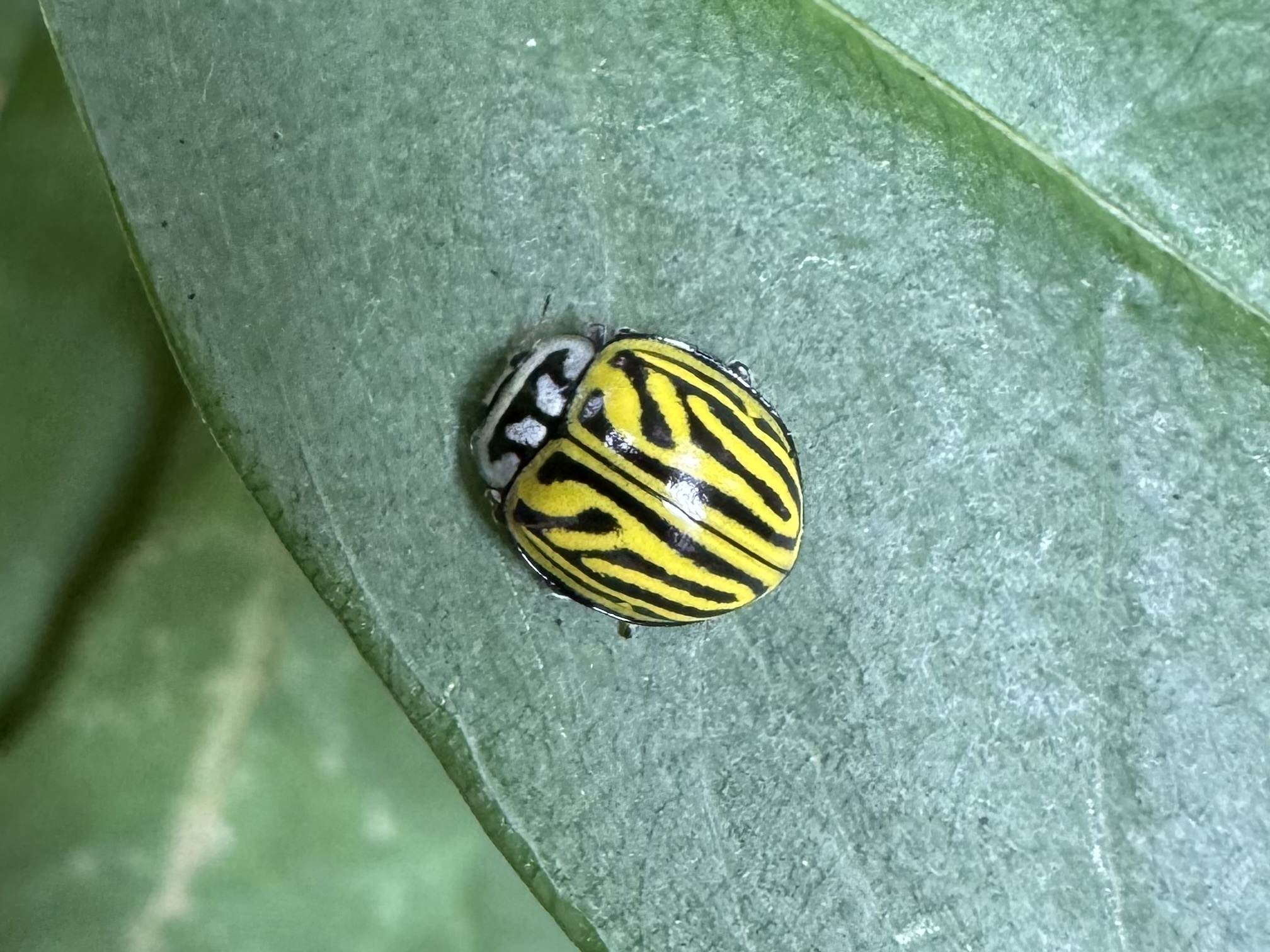

Scientific classification
- Kingdom: Animalia
- Phylum: Arthropoda
- Clade: Pancrustacea
- Class: Insecta
- Order: Coleoptera
- Suborder: Polyphaga
- Infraorder: Cucujiformia
- Family: Coccinellidae
- Genus: Archegleis
- Species: A. edwardsii

Binomial name
- Archegleis edwardsii (Mulsant, 1850)

Synonyms
- Egleis edwardsii Mulsant, 1850; Egleis pascoei Crotch, 1874

= Archegleis edwardsii =

Species of beetle

Archegleis edwardsii is a species of beetle of the family Coccinellidae. It is found in Australia (southern Queensland, New South Wales).

== Description ==
Adults reach a length of about 5–6.7 mm (0.20–0.26 in). They have a greenish-yellow body with black markings. The frons and antennae are yellow. The pronotum is yellow with black stripes and the scutellum is black. The elytra are greenish yellow with black stripes and borders.
