= Pseudoryssomus formosus =

Scientific classification
- Kingdom: Animalia
- Phylum: Arthropoda
- Clade: Pancrustacea
- Class: Insecta
- Order: Coleoptera
- Suborder: Polyphaga
- Infraorder: Cucujiformia
- Family: Coccinellidae
- Genus: Pseudoryssomus
- Species: P. formosus

Binomial name
- Pseudoryssomus formosus Gordon, 1974

Species of beetle

Pseudoryssomus formosus is a species of beetle of the family Coccinellidae. It is found in Costa Rica and Guatemala.

== Description ==
Adults reach a length of about 4.25–5.38 mm. Adults are yellowish red. The pronotum is red with two oval yellow areas and a small black spot. The elytron is black with a red lateral border.
