= Oryssomus lineatus =

Scientific classification
- Kingdom: Animalia
- Phylum: Arthropoda
- Clade: Pancrustacea
- Class: Insecta
- Order: Coleoptera
- Suborder: Polyphaga
- Infraorder: Cucujiformia
- Family: Coccinellidae
- Genus: Oryssomus
- Species: O. lineatus

Binomial name
- Oryssomus lineatus Gordon, 1974

Species of beetle

Oryssomus lineatus is a species of beetle of the family Coccinellidae. It is found in Bolivia and Trinidad.

== Description ==
Adults reach a length of about 3.72–4.70 mm. Adults are brownish red. The pronotum is black, although the apical five-eighths are yellow and the elytron is black with a red area.
