= Pseudoepipleuria stillata =

Scientific classification
- Kingdom: Animalia
- Phylum: Arthropoda
- Clade: Pancrustacea
- Class: Insecta
- Order: Coleoptera
- Suborder: Polyphaga
- Infraorder: Cucujiformia
- Family: Coccinellidae
- Genus: Pseudoepipleuria
- Species: P. stillata

Binomial name
- Pseudoepipleuria stillata (Fürsch, 1992)

Synonyms
- Rhyzobius stillatus Fürsch, 1992

Species of beetle

Pseudoepipleuria stillata is a species of beetle of the family Coccinellidae. It is found in South Africa (Western Cape, Eastern Cape).

== Description ==
Adults reach a length of about 1.93–2.75 mm (0.076–0.108 in). They have an elongate and almost parallel-sided, flattened body. The pronotum is black and the elytra are black with one or two orange or yellowish spots. The antennae and legs are brown. The pubescence on the dorsum consists of appresed setae and darker stiff bristles.
