= Scymnodes styx =

Scientific classification
- Kingdom: Animalia
- Phylum: Arthropoda
- Clade: Pancrustacea
- Class: Insecta
- Order: Coleoptera
- Suborder: Polyphaga
- Infraorder: Cucujiformia
- Family: Coccinellidae
- Genus: Scymnodes
- Species: S. styx

Binomial name
- Scymnodes styx (Blackburn, 1895)

Synonyms
- Scymnus styx Blackburn, 1895

Species of beetle

Scymnodes styx is a species of beetle of the family Coccinellidae. It is found in Australia (Queensland, New South Wales) and Indonesia (Irian Jaya).

== Description ==
Adults reach a length of about 1.8–2.5 mm (0.071–0.098 in). They have an elongate to short oval, convex body. The dorsal surface is covered with silvery white pubescence and the elytra with recumbent and semi-erect hairs. The dorsal surface is dark reddish-brown to black. while the ventral surface and antennae are yellowish brown to testaceous and the legs dark reddish brown.
