= Ponaria daviesi =

Scientific classification
- Kingdom: Animalia
- Phylum: Arthropoda
- Clade: Pancrustacea
- Class: Insecta
- Order: Coleoptera
- Suborder: Polyphaga
- Infraorder: Cucujiformia
- Family: Coccinellidae
- Genus: Ponaria
- Species: P. daviesi

Binomial name
- Ponaria daviesi Gordon & Hanley, 2017

Species of beetle

Ponaria daviesi is a species of beetle of the family Coccinellidae. It is found in Bolivia.

== Description ==
Adults reach a length of about 1.1 mm. Adults are black or sometimes greenish black. The lateral margin of the pronotum and elytron are reddish brown.
