= Gordonita norae =

Scientific classification
- Kingdom: Animalia
- Phylum: Arthropoda
- Clade: Pancrustacea
- Class: Insecta
- Order: Coleoptera
- Suborder: Polyphaga
- Infraorder: Cucujiformia
- Family: Coccinellidae
- Genus: Gordonita
- Species: G. norae

Binomial name
- Gordonita norae Churata & Almeida, 2026

Species of beetle

Gordonita norae is a species of beetle of the family Coccinellidae. It is found in Bolivia.

== Description ==
Adults reach a length of about 3.07–3.39 mm (0.121–0.133 in) for males and 3.06–3.56 mm (0.120–0.140 in) for females. They have a rounded body with whitish, fine, dense and short pubescence. The integument is black with a bluish metallic reflection and yellow spots forming a V-shape on the elytral disc. The head is black, with the antennae and mouthparts yellowish. The pronotum is black, with a continuous yellow spot across the anterior margin. The scutellar shield is black and the elytra are black with a bluish metallic reflection and with two spots on each elytron. The legs are yellowish black.

== Etymology ==
The species is named in honour of the Argentinian entomologist Dr. Nora Cabrera.
