= Ponaria hurtadoi =

Scientific classification
- Kingdom: Animalia
- Phylum: Arthropoda
- Clade: Pancrustacea
- Class: Insecta
- Order: Coleoptera
- Suborder: Polyphaga
- Infraorder: Cucujiformia
- Family: Coccinellidae
- Genus: Ponaria
- Species: P. hurtadoi

Binomial name
- Ponaria hurtadoi Gordon & Hanley, 2017

Species of beetle

Ponaria hurtadoi is a species of beetle of the family Coccinellidae. It is found in Brazil.

== Description ==
Adults reach a length of about 1.1–1.2 mm. Adults are black with a greenish tint and a black head. The pronotum and elytron have a reddish brown margin.

== Etymology ==
The species is named for the collector of the type series.
