= Psorolyma doyeni =

Scientific classification
- Kingdom: Animalia
- Phylum: Arthropoda
- Clade: Pancrustacea
- Class: Insecta
- Order: Coleoptera
- Suborder: Polyphaga
- Infraorder: Cucujiformia
- Family: Coccinellidae
- Genus: Psorolyma
- Species: P. doyeni

Binomial name
- Psorolyma doyeni Gordon, 1994

Species of beetle

Psorolyma doyeni is a species of beetle of the family Coccinellidae. It is found in Jamaica.

== Description ==
Adults reach a length of about 2-2.5 mm. Adults are black, the head and pronotum with a green sheen and the elytron with a purple sheen.

== Etymology ==
The species is named for John Doyen, collector of the type series.
