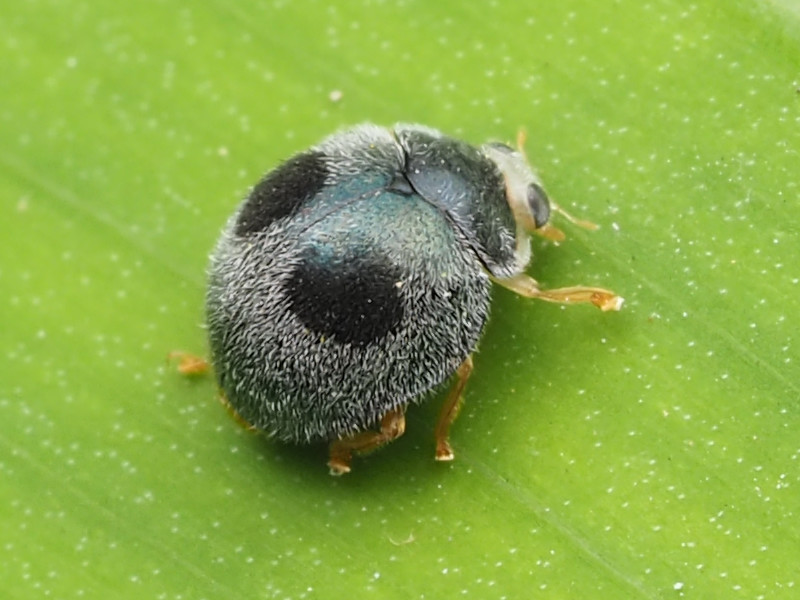

Scientific classification
- Kingdom: Animalia
- Phylum: Arthropoda
- Clade: Pancrustacea
- Class: Insecta
- Order: Coleoptera
- Suborder: Polyphaga
- Infraorder: Cucujiformia
- Family: Coccinellidae
- Genus: Azya
- Species: A. orbigera

Binomial name
- Azya orbigera Mulsant, 1850

= Azya orbigera =

Species of beetle

Azya orbigera, the globe-marked lady beetle, is a species of lady beetle in the family Coccinellidae. It is found in North America, Oceania, and South America.

== Description ==
Adults reach a length of about 2.90-4.25 mm. They have a yellow head and greenish black dorsum. The elytron has a round discal spot.

== Subspecies ==
These two subspecies belong to the species Azya orbigera:

- Azya orbigera ecuadorica Gordon, 1980
- Azya orbigera orbigera Mulsant, 1850
