= Siola atra =

Scientific classification
- Kingdom: Animalia
- Phylum: Arthropoda
- Clade: Pancrustacea
- Class: Insecta
- Order: Coleoptera
- Suborder: Polyphaga
- Infraorder: Cucujiformia
- Family: Coccinellidae
- Genus: Siola
- Species: S. atra

Binomial name
- Siola atra González, 2015

Species of beetle

Siola atra is a species of beetle of the family Coccinellidae. It is found in Ecuador.

== Description ==
Adults reach a length of about 2.7 mm. Adults are black with an iridescent sheen.
