= Scymnodes howdenorum =

Scientific classification
- Kingdom: Animalia
- Phylum: Arthropoda
- Clade: Pancrustacea
- Class: Insecta
- Order: Coleoptera
- Suborder: Polyphaga
- Infraorder: Cucujiformia
- Family: Coccinellidae
- Genus: Scymnodes
- Species: S. howdenorum

Binomial name
- Scymnodes howdenorum Poorani & Ślipiński, 2009

Species of beetle

Scymnodes howdenorum is a species of beetle of the family Coccinellidae. It is found in Australia (Queensland, New South Wales, Western Australia).

== Description ==
Adults reach a length of about 2.5–3.5 mm (0.098–0.138 in). They have an elongate oval body. The dorsal surface is black to dark brown and covered with yellowish white pubescence. The anterolateral corners of the pronotum are dull reddish testaceous and the anterior margin is dark reddish brown. The elytra are dark pitchy brown to black. The ventral surface is dark reddish brown, but the antennae are reddish brown to yellowish testaceous.

== Etymology ==
The species is dedicated to the collectors of the type series, Drs Anne and Henry Howden.
