= Psorolyma maxillosa =

Scientific classification
- Kingdom: Animalia
- Phylum: Arthropoda
- Clade: Pancrustacea
- Class: Insecta
- Order: Coleoptera
- Suborder: Polyphaga
- Infraorder: Cucujiformia
- Family: Coccinellidae
- Genus: Psorolyma
- Species: P. maxillosa

Binomial name
- Psorolyma maxillosa Sicard, 1922

Species of beetle

Psorolyma maxillosa is a species of beetle of the family Coccinellidae. It is found in Puerto Rico.

== Description ==
Adults are metallic blue or green.
