= Parastethorus truncatus =

Scientific classification
- Kingdom: Animalia
- Phylum: Arthropoda
- Clade: Pancrustacea
- Class: Insecta
- Order: Coleoptera
- Suborder: Polyphaga
- Infraorder: Cucujiformia
- Family: Coccinellidae
- Genus: Parastethorus
- Species: P. truncatus

Binomial name
- Parastethorus truncatus (Kapur, 1948)

Synonyms
- Stethorus truncatus Kapur, 1948

Species of beetle

Parastethorus truncatus is a species of beetle of the family Coccinellidae. It is found in China (Guangdong) and Peninsular Malaysia.

== Description ==
Adults reach a length of about 1.15–1.2 mm (0.045–0.047 in). The dorsum and underside are entirely black, except for the yellowish brown antennae and mouthparts. The legs are also yellowish brown, but the femora are mostly dark brown.
