= Pseudoazya =

Scientific classification
- Kingdom: Animalia
- Phylum: Arthropoda
- Clade: Pancrustacea
- Class: Insecta
- Order: Coleoptera
- Suborder: Polyphaga
- Infraorder: Cucujiformia
- Family: Coccinellidae
- Tribe: Coccidulini
- Genus: Pseudoazya; Gordon, 1980

Genus of beetles

Pseudoazya is a genus of minute lady beetles in the family Coccinellidae.

== Species ==
- Pseudoazya aberrans Gordon, 1980
- Pseudoazya boliviana Gordon, 1980
- Pseudoazya gnoma Gordon, 1980
- Pseudoazya massayo Duarte-de-Mélo & Almeida, 2024
- Pseudoazya mirabilis Duarte-de-Mélo & Almeida, 2024
- Pseudoazya nana (Marshall, 1912)
- Pseudoazya pusilla (Weise, 1922)
- Pseudoazya trinitatis (Marshall, 1912)
