= Psorolyma =

Scientific classification
- Kingdom: Animalia
- Phylum: Arthropoda
- Clade: Pancrustacea
- Class: Insecta
- Order: Coleoptera
- Suborder: Polyphaga
- Infraorder: Cucujiformia
- Family: Coccinellidae
- Tribe: Coccidulini
- Genus: Psorolyma; Sicard, 1922

Genus of beetles

Psorolyma is a genus of minute lady beetles in the family Coccinellidae.

== Species ==
- Psorolyma baorucensis Gordon, 1994
- Psorolyma cyanella Gordon, 1974
- Psorolyma doyeni Gordon, 1994
- Psorolyma maxillosa Sicard, 1922
- Psorolyma sicardi Gordon, 1974
