= Parastethorus grandoaperturus =

Scientific classification
- Kingdom: Animalia
- Phylum: Arthropoda
- Clade: Pancrustacea
- Class: Insecta
- Order: Coleoptera
- Suborder: Polyphaga
- Infraorder: Cucujiformia
- Family: Coccinellidae
- Genus: Parastethorus
- Species: P. grandoaperturus

Binomial name
- Parastethorus grandoaperturus Li et al., 2015

Species of beetle

Parastethorus grandoaperturus is a species of beetle of the family Coccinellidae. It is found in China (Yunnan).

== Description ==
Adults reach a length of about 1.25 mm (0.049 in). The dorsum and underside are entirely black, except for the yellowish brown antennae, mouthparts and legs.

== Etymology ==
The species name is derived from Latin and refers to the deeply semicircular notched apex of penis guide in ventral view.
