= Parastethorus miniaperturus =

Scientific classification
- Kingdom: Animalia
- Phylum: Arthropoda
- Clade: Pancrustacea
- Class: Insecta
- Order: Coleoptera
- Suborder: Polyphaga
- Infraorder: Cucujiformia
- Family: Coccinellidae
- Genus: Parastethorus
- Species: P. miniaperturus

Binomial name
- Parastethorus miniaperturus Li et al., 2015

Species of beetle

Parastethorus miniaperturus is a species of beetle of the family Coccinellidae. It is found in China (Zhejiang).

== Description ==
Adults reach a length of about 1.23–1.27 mm (0.048–0.050 in). The dorsum and underside are entirely black, except for the testaceous antennae and mouthparts and yellow legs.

== Etymology ==
The species name is derived from Latin and refers to the small U-shaped apical notch of the penis guide in ventral view.
