= Scymnodes fulvohirtus =

Scientific classification
- Kingdom: Animalia
- Phylum: Arthropoda
- Clade: Pancrustacea
- Class: Insecta
- Order: Coleoptera
- Suborder: Polyphaga
- Infraorder: Cucujiformia
- Family: Coccinellidae
- Genus: Scymnodes
- Species: S. fulvohirtus

Binomial name
- Scymnodes fulvohirtus (Blackburn, 1892)

Synonyms
- Scymnodes koebeli var. fulvohirtus Blackburn, 1892

Species of beetle

Scymnodes fulvohirtus is a species of beetle of the family Coccinellidae. It is found in Australia (New South Wales, Queensland).

== Description ==
Adults reach a length of about 2.75–3 mm (0.108–0.118 in). They have an elongate oval, convex body. The dorsal surface is mostly black, although the anterolateral corners of the pronotum are somewhat paler, dark testaceous brown. They are covered with yellowish pubescence. The ventral surface is dark reddish brown to pitchy brown. The antennae are yellowish to testaceous.
