= Scymnodes metallicus =

Scientific classification
- Kingdom: Animalia
- Phylum: Arthropoda
- Clade: Pancrustacea
- Class: Insecta
- Order: Coleoptera
- Suborder: Polyphaga
- Infraorder: Cucujiformia
- Family: Coccinellidae
- Genus: Scymnodes
- Species: S. metallicus

Binomial name
- Scymnodes metallicus Poorani & Ślipiński, 2009

Species of beetle

Scymnodes metallicus is a species of beetle of the family Coccinellidae. It is found in Papua New Guinea.

== Description ==
Adults reach a length of about 3–3.5 mm (0.12–0.14 in). They have an oval-elliptic, convex body with dense silvery white pubescence. The head is black and the pronotum is black with yellowish testaceous anterolateral corners. The elytra are black with a dark bluish to aeneous tint. The ventral surface is dark pitchy brown to black, while the antennae are yellowish-testaceous.

== Etymology ==
The species name refers to the metallic bluish, iridescent elytra.
