= Parastethorus pinicola =

Scientific classification
- Kingdom: Animalia
- Phylum: Arthropoda
- Clade: Pancrustacea
- Class: Insecta
- Order: Coleoptera
- Suborder: Polyphaga
- Infraorder: Cucujiformia
- Family: Coccinellidae
- Genus: Parastethorus
- Species: P. pinicola

Binomial name
- Parastethorus pinicola Seki & Maruyama, 2025

Species of beetle

Parastethorus pinicola is a species of beetle of the family Coccinellidae. It is found in Japan (Honshu, Kyushu, Ryukyu Islands).

== Description ==
Adults reach a length of about 1.03–1.23 mm (0.041–0.048 in). They have an elongate oval, moderately convex body, which is densely covered with yellowish-white setae. The dorsum and underside are entirely black, except for the yellowish-brown antennae, mouthparts and legs.

== Etymology ==
The species name is derived from Latin pinus (meaning pine) and incola (meaning inhabitant) and refers to the fact that the species is frequently collected from pine trees.
