= Psorolyma baorucensis =

Scientific classification
- Kingdom: Animalia
- Phylum: Arthropoda
- Clade: Pancrustacea
- Class: Insecta
- Order: Coleoptera
- Suborder: Polyphaga
- Infraorder: Cucujiformia
- Family: Coccinellidae
- Genus: Psorolyma
- Species: P. baorucensis

Binomial name
- Psorolyma baorucensis Gordon, 1994

Species of beetle

Psorolyma baorucensis is a species of beetle of the family Coccinellidae. It is found in the Dominican Republic.

== Description ==
Adults reach a length of about 1.75–2.3 mm. Adults are black, the head and pronotum with a purple sheen and the elytron with a green sheen.

== Etymology ==
The species is named for the mountains where the type series originated.
