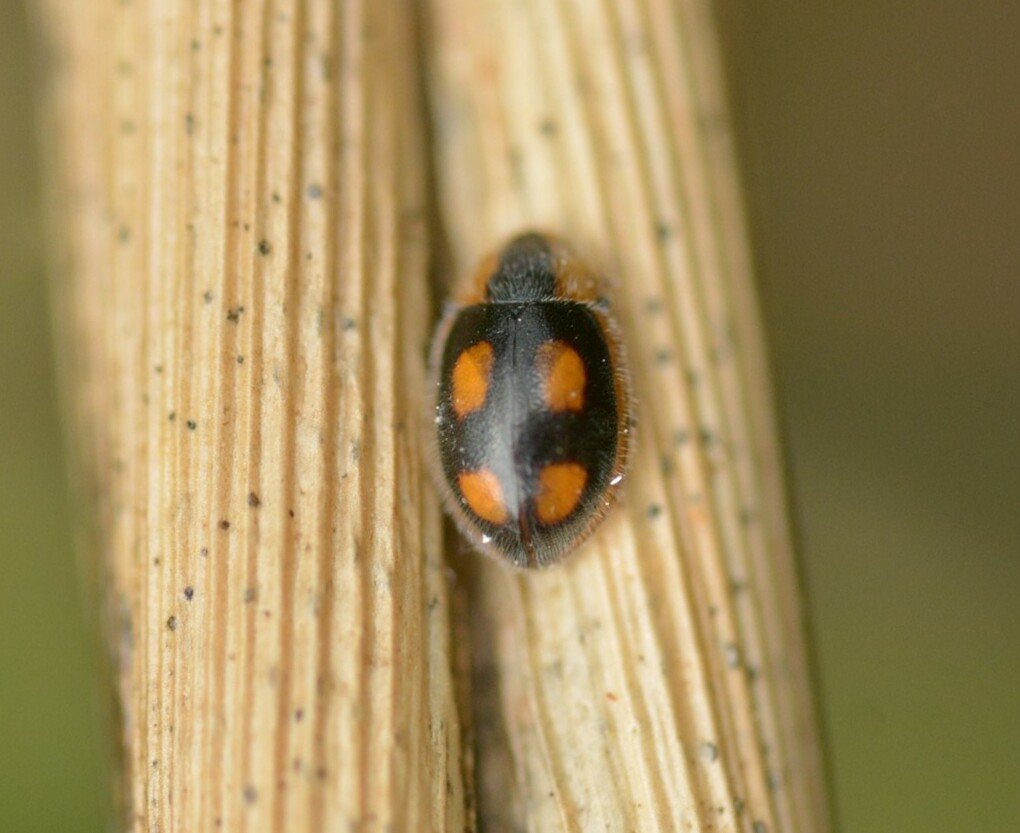

Scientific classification
- Kingdom: Animalia
- Phylum: Arthropoda
- Clade: Pancrustacea
- Class: Insecta
- Order: Coleoptera
- Suborder: Polyphaga
- Infraorder: Cucujiformia
- Family: Coccinellidae
- Subfamily: Coccidulinae
- Tribe: Coccidulini
- Genus: Hoangus; Ukrainsky, 2007
- Species: H. venustus

Binomial name
- Hoangus venustus (Pascoe, 1875)

Synonyms
- Cranophorus venustus (Pascoe, 1875); Cassiculus venustus Weise, 1895

= Hoangus =

Genus of beetles

Hoangus venustus, commonly known as the flax ladybird, is a species of ladybird beetle that is endemic to New Zealand. It is widespread in the North Island and in the northern half of the South Island. It can be found on New Zealand flax reportedly eating the mealybugs that live there. Previously known as Cassiculus venustus and Cranophorus venustus, the valid name of the species is now Hoangus venustus. It is the only species in the genus Hoangus.

== Taxonomy ==
This species was first described as Cranophorus venustus in 1875 by English entomologist Francis Polkinghorne Pascoe from a single specimen collected in the Waikato region by Frederick Hutton. The holotype is stored in the Natural History Museum of London. In 1880, the description was repeated by Thomas Broun in his landmark "Manual of the New Zealand Coleoptera" book, in which he noted the species was also found in Auckland and Tairua. In 1895, the species was moved to the Cassiculus genus. In 2006, it underwent another revision where it was moved into the Hoangus genus, of which it is the only species. It was most recently revised in 2019, in which it was given a comprehensive redescription.

== Description ==
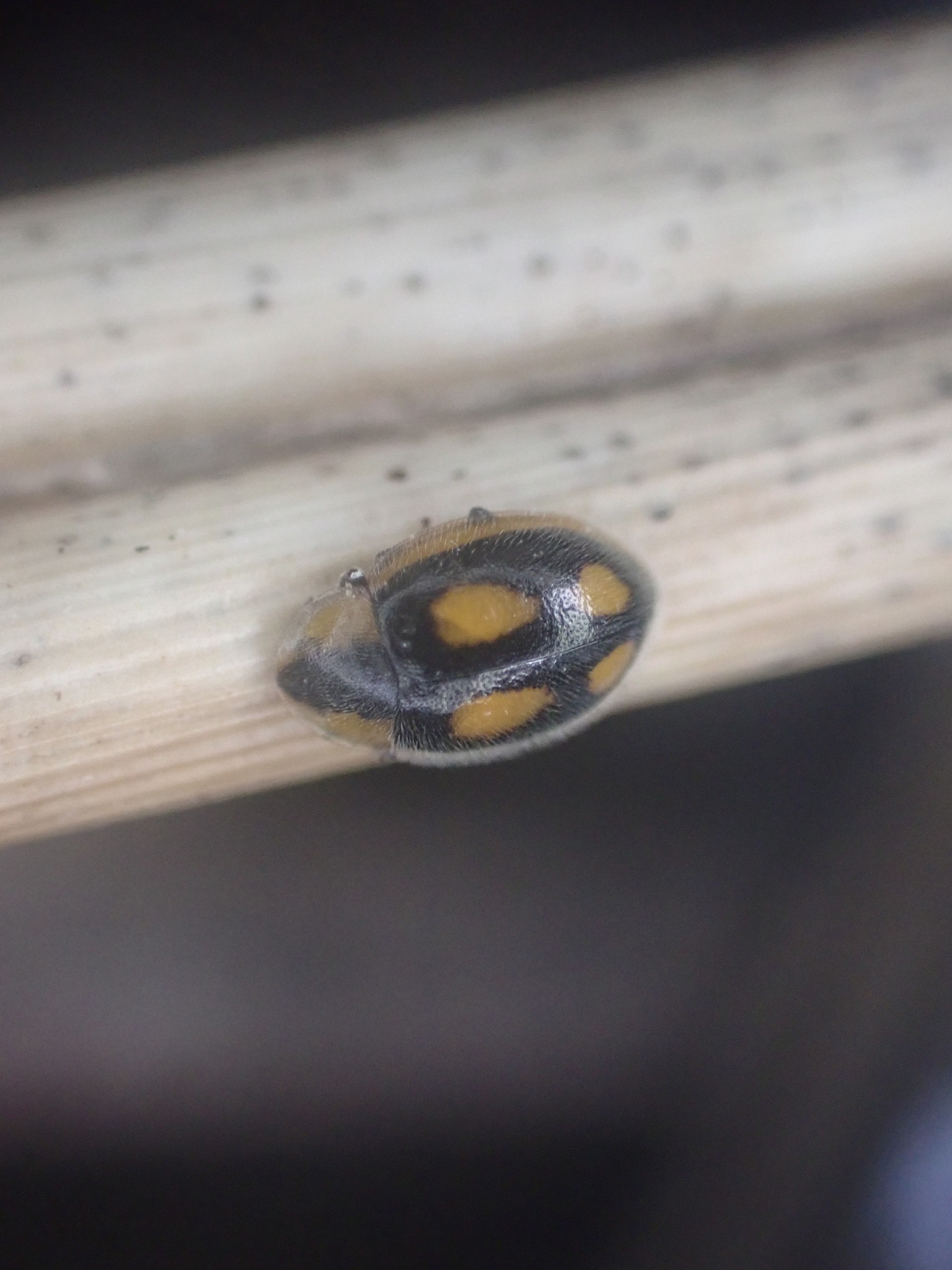

As adults, the beetles are 4.3-4.4mm in length. They are coloured black and orange. The head is orange on each side with black running down the middle, while its elytra or wing cases (which cover the abdomen) are orange around the edge with black covering much of the area. The elytra also have two pairs of orange dots.

== Distribution and habitat ==
Hoangus venustus are endemic to New Zealand, where they are widespread throughout the North Island. They are also known from the northern half of the South Island. They are typically associated with New Zealand Flax (Phormium tenax).

== Diet ==
Because of their association with flax, they are presumed to be active predators that feed on mealybugs specialised on flax.

== See also ==
- Coccinella leonina, another native ladybird
