= Scymnodes hirtus =

Scientific classification
- Kingdom: Animalia
- Phylum: Arthropoda
- Clade: Pancrustacea
- Class: Insecta
- Order: Coleoptera
- Suborder: Polyphaga
- Infraorder: Cucujiformia
- Family: Coccinellidae
- Genus: Scymnodes
- Species: S. hirtus

Binomial name
- Scymnodes hirtus Poorani & Ślipiński, 2009

Species of beetle

Scymnodes hirtus is a species of beetle of the family Coccinellidae. It is found in Papua New Guinea.

== Description ==
Adults reach a length of about 3–3.5 mm (0.12–0.14 in). They have a broadly oval, strongly convex body. The head is yellow and the pronotum is either yellow or with a black or fuscous marking. The elytra are black with reddish-yellowish apices.

== Etymology ==
The species name refers to the dense dorsal pubescence.
