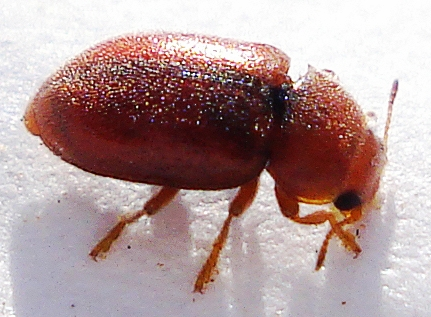
- Coccidula rufa

Scientific classification
- Kingdom: Animalia
- Phylum: Arthropoda
- Clade: Pancrustacea
- Class: Insecta
- Order: Coleoptera
- Suborder: Polyphaga
- Infraorder: Cucujiformia
- Family: Coccinellidae
- Tribe: Coccidulini
- Genus: Coccidula; Kugelann, 1798

Synonyms
- Strongylus Panzer, 1813; Cacidula Dejean, 1821; Cacicula Stephens, 1831

= Coccidula =

Genus of lady beetles

Coccidula is a genus of lady beetles in the family Coccinellidae. There are five species described in Coccidula.

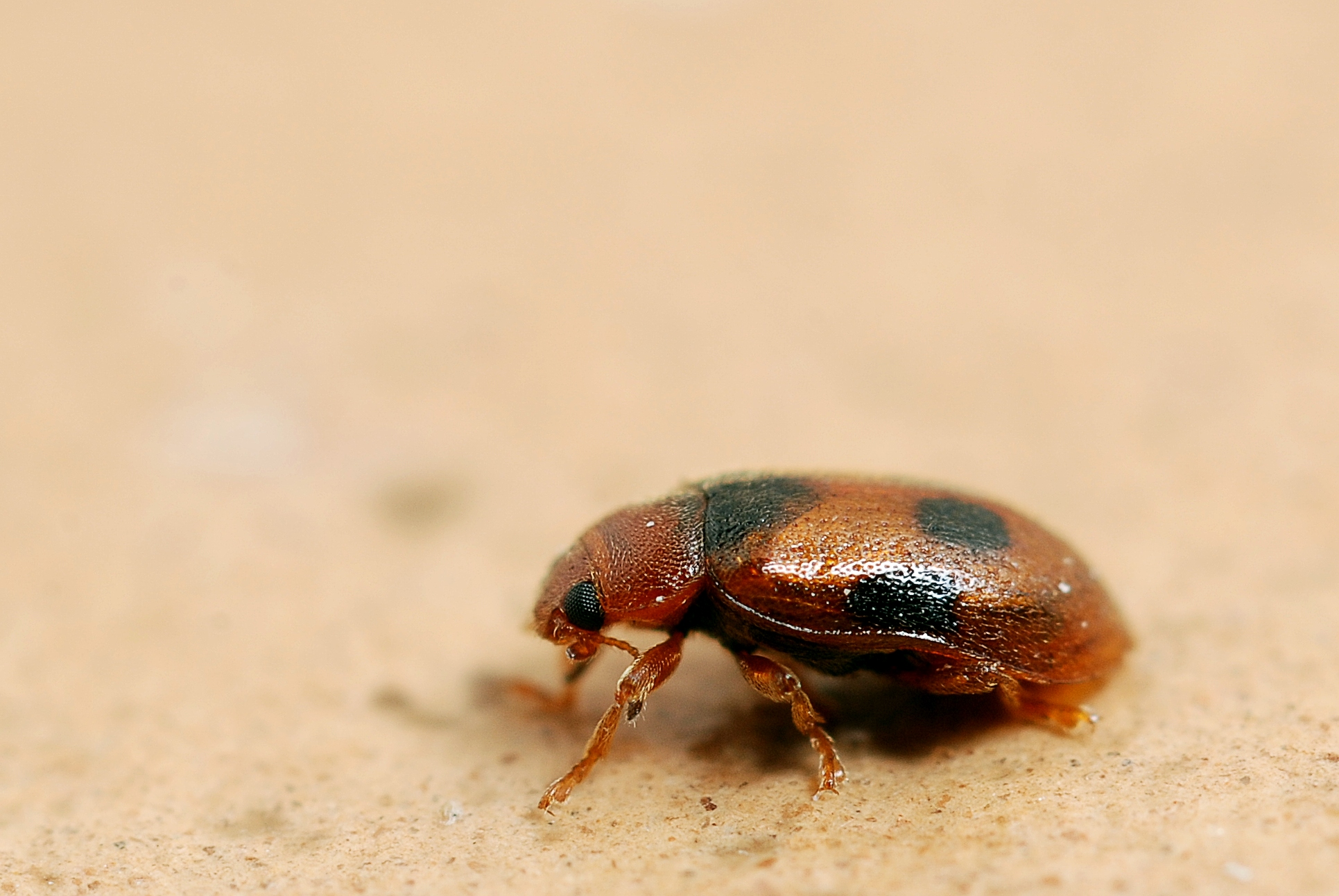
Coccidula scutellata

== Species ==
These five species belong to the genus Coccidula:

- Coccidula lepida LeConte, 1852 (snow lady beetle)
- Coccidula litophiloides Reitter, 1890
- Coccidula reitteri Dodge, 1938
- Coccidula rufa (Herbst, 1783)
- Coccidula scutellata (Herbst, 1783)
