= Scymnodes laticollis =

Scientific classification
- Kingdom: Animalia
- Phylum: Arthropoda
- Clade: Pancrustacea
- Class: Insecta
- Order: Coleoptera
- Suborder: Polyphaga
- Infraorder: Cucujiformia
- Family: Coccinellidae
- Genus: Scymnodes
- Species: S. laticollis

Binomial name
- Scymnodes laticollis (Weise, 1913)

Synonyms
- Rhizobius laticollis Weise, 1913

Species of beetle

Scymnodes laticollis is a species of beetle of the family Coccinellidae. It is found in Indonesia (Irian Jaya) and Papua New Guinea.

== Description ==
Adults reach a length of about 4 mm (0.16 in). They have an elongate oblong-oval, strongly convex body. The dorsal surface is covered with whitish pubescence. The head is yellowish and the pronotum is black with testaceous anterolateral corners. The elytra are mostly black. The ventral surface and antennae are yellowish.
