= Zilus subtropicus =

Scientific classification
- Kingdom: Animalia
- Phylum: Arthropoda
- Clade: Pancrustacea
- Class: Insecta
- Order: Coleoptera
- Suborder: Polyphaga
- Infraorder: Cucujiformia
- Family: Coccinellidae
- Genus: Zilus
- Species: Z. subtropicus

Binomial name
- Zilus subtropicus (Casey, 1924)

Synonyms
- Delphastus subtropicus Casey, 1924

Species of beetle

Zilus subtropicus is a species of lady beetle in the family Coccinellidae. It is found in North America, where it has been recorded from Florida.

== Description ==
Adults reach a length of about 1.60-1.80 mm. They have a metallic purple or blue body, while the pronotum is often metallic green.
