= Parastethorus baiyunshanensis =

Scientific classification
- Kingdom: Animalia
- Phylum: Arthropoda
- Clade: Pancrustacea
- Class: Insecta
- Order: Coleoptera
- Suborder: Polyphaga
- Infraorder: Cucujiformia
- Family: Coccinellidae
- Genus: Parastethorus
- Species: P. baiyunshanensis

Binomial name
- Parastethorus baiyunshanensis (Ren & Pang, 1996)

Synonyms
- Stethorus baiyunshanensis Ren & Pang, 1996

Species of beetle

Parastethorus baiyunshanensis is a species of beetle of the family Coccinellidae. It is found in China (Guangdong).

== Description ==
Adults reach a length of about 1.02 mm (0.040 in). The dorsum and underside are entirely black, except for the yellow antennae and mouthparts. The legs are also yellow, but the femora are mostly brown.
