= Axinoscymnus singaporicus =

Scientific classification
- Kingdom: Animalia
- Phylum: Arthropoda
- Clade: Pancrustacea
- Class: Insecta
- Order: Coleoptera
- Suborder: Polyphaga
- Infraorder: Cucujiformia
- Family: Coccinellidae
- Genus: Axinoscymnus
- Species: A. singaporicus

Binomial name
- Axinoscymnus singaporicus Pang & Gordon, 1986

Species of beetle

Axinoscymnus singaporicus is a species of beetle of the family Coccinellidae. It is found in Singapore.

== Description ==
Adults reach a length of about 1.4–1.6 mm. Adults have a yellow head and pronotum and the elytron is dark brown with a yellow basal border.
