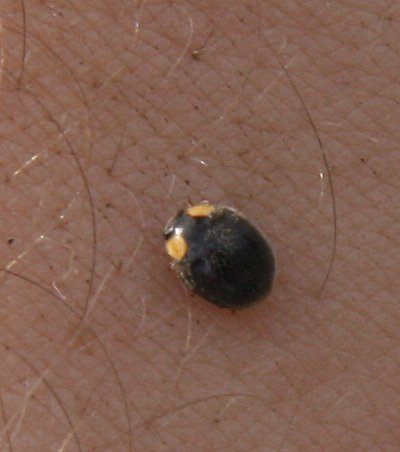

Scientific classification
- Kingdom: Animalia
- Phylum: Arthropoda
- Clade: Pancrustacea
- Class: Insecta
- Order: Coleoptera
- Suborder: Polyphaga
- Infraorder: Cucujiformia
- Family: Coccinellidae
- Genus: Apolinus
- Species: A. lividigaster

Binomial name
- Apolinus lividigaster (Mulsant, 1853)

Synonyms
- Platyomus lividigaster Mulsant, 1853; Scymnodes lividigaster; Scymnodes chapuisi Weise, 1923; Ortalia wallacii Crotch, 1874

= Apolinus lividigaster =

Species of beetle

Apolinus lividigaster, the yellow-shouldered ladybird, is a small ladybird beetle found in Australia and New Guinea, and introduced to New Zealand, New Caledonia, the Cook Islands, French Polynesia, Samoa and Hawaii.

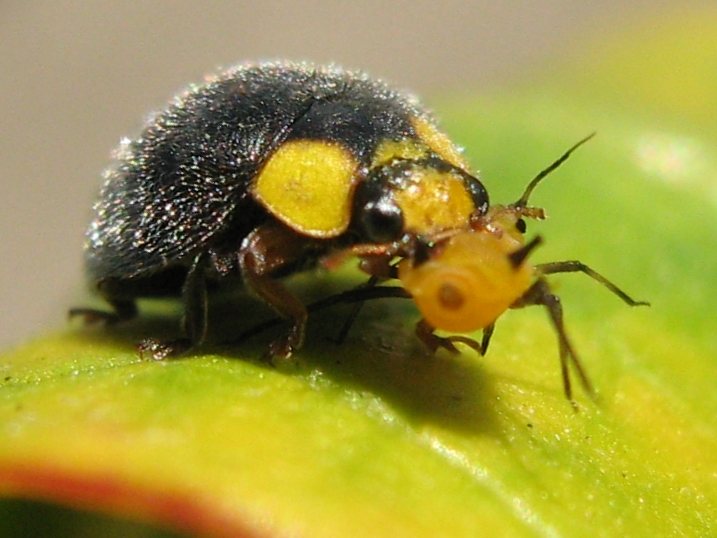
Apolinus lividigaster with Aphis nerii

== Subspecies ==
- Apolinus lividigaster lividigaster (Australia [Australian Capital Territory, Queensland, New South Wales, South Australia, Victoria, Western Australia]), introduced to New Zealand, New Caledonia, Cook Islands, French Polynesia, Samoa, Hawaii)
- Apolinus lividigaster wallacii (Crotch, 1874) (New Guinea, Irian Jaya)
