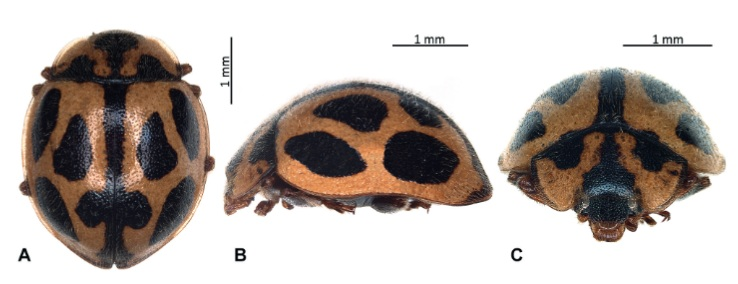

Scientific classification
- Kingdom: Animalia
- Phylum: Arthropoda
- Clade: Pancrustacea
- Class: Insecta
- Order: Coleoptera
- Suborder: Polyphaga
- Infraorder: Cucujiformia
- Family: Coccinellidae
- Genus: Eupalea
- Species: E. borowieci

Binomial name
- Eupalea borowieci Szawaryn & Czerwiński, 2022

= Eupalea borowieci =

Species of beetle

Eupalea borowieci is a species of beetle of the family Coccinellidae. It is found in Ecuador.

== Description ==
Adults reach a length of about 3.50 mm. They have a black head and the pronotum is yellow with the basal margin and half length of the lateral margins black. There are also three black maculae. The elytron is yellow with the suture and apex black, and with four black spots.

== Etymology ==
The species is named for the Polish entomologist and world expert in Cassidinae (Chrysomelidae), collector of the type series, Lech Borowiec (University of Wrocław).
