= Coccidula lepida =

Scientific classification
- Kingdom: Animalia
- Phylum: Arthropoda
- Clade: Pancrustacea
- Class: Insecta
- Order: Coleoptera
- Suborder: Polyphaga
- Infraorder: Cucujiformia
- Family: Coccinellidae
- Genus: Coccidula
- Species: C. lepida

Binomial name
- Coccidula lepida LeConte, 1852

Synonyms
- Coccidula occidentalis Horn, 1895; Coccidula lepida var. suturalis Weise, 1895

Species of beetle

Coccidula lepida, known generally as the snow lady beetle or black arrow lady beetle, is a species of lady beetle in the family Coccinellidae. It is found in North America, where it has been recorded from Quebec to New Jersey, west to Alaska and Colorado.

== Description ==
Adults reach a length of about 2.75-3.45 mm. They are yellow, with a black head. The elytron is yellow with black spots.
