= Scymnodes obscuricollis =

Scientific classification
- Kingdom: Animalia
- Phylum: Arthropoda
- Clade: Pancrustacea
- Class: Insecta
- Order: Coleoptera
- Suborder: Polyphaga
- Infraorder: Cucujiformia
- Family: Coccinellidae
- Genus: Scymnodes
- Species: S. obscuricollis

Binomial name
- Scymnodes obscuricollis (Blackburn, 1895)

Synonyms
- Platyomus obscuricollis Blackburn, 1895

Species of beetle

Scymnodes obscuricollis is a species of beetle of the family Coccinellidae. It is found in Australia (Queensland).

== Description ==
Adults reach a length of about 3.5 mm (0.14 in). They have an oblong-oval, convex body. The head is black and the pronotum is reddish-testaceous, with a triangular black marking and the anterior margin black, while the lateral margins are dark brown. The elytra are mostly black. The ventral surface is dark pitchy brown to black, but the antennae and legs are testaceous.
