= Archegleis duplicata =

Scientific classification
- Kingdom: Animalia
- Phylum: Arthropoda
- Clade: Pancrustacea
- Class: Insecta
- Order: Coleoptera
- Suborder: Polyphaga
- Infraorder: Cucujiformia
- Family: Coccinellidae
- Genus: Archegleis
- Species: A. duplicata

Binomial name
- Archegleis duplicata (Crotch, 1874)

Synonyms
- Callineda duplicata Crotch, 1874

Species of beetle

Archegleis duplicata is a species of beetle of the family Coccinellidae. It is found in Australia (Western Australia).

== Description ==
Adults reach a length of about 5.6–6 mm (0.22–0.24 in). The head, antennae and legs are yellow, while the pronotum is peach-yellow, with two black spots. The scutellum is pale with black lateral borders and the elytra are pale testaceous with six black spots and black borders. The ventral surface is yellow.
