= Parastethorus indira =

Scientific classification
- Kingdom: Animalia
- Phylum: Arthropoda
- Clade: Pancrustacea
- Class: Insecta
- Order: Coleoptera
- Suborder: Polyphaga
- Infraorder: Cucujiformia
- Family: Coccinellidae
- Genus: Parastethorus
- Species: P. indira

Binomial name
- Parastethorus indira (Kapur, 1950)

Synonyms
- Stethorus indira Kapur, 1950

Species of beetle

Parastethorus indira is a species of beetle of the family Coccinellidae. It is found in China (Zhejiang, Guangxi, Guizhou), India and Thailand.

== Description ==
Adults reach a length of about 1.18–1.27 mm (0.046–0.050 in). The dorsum and underside are entirely black, except for the yellowish brown antennae, mouthparts and legs.
