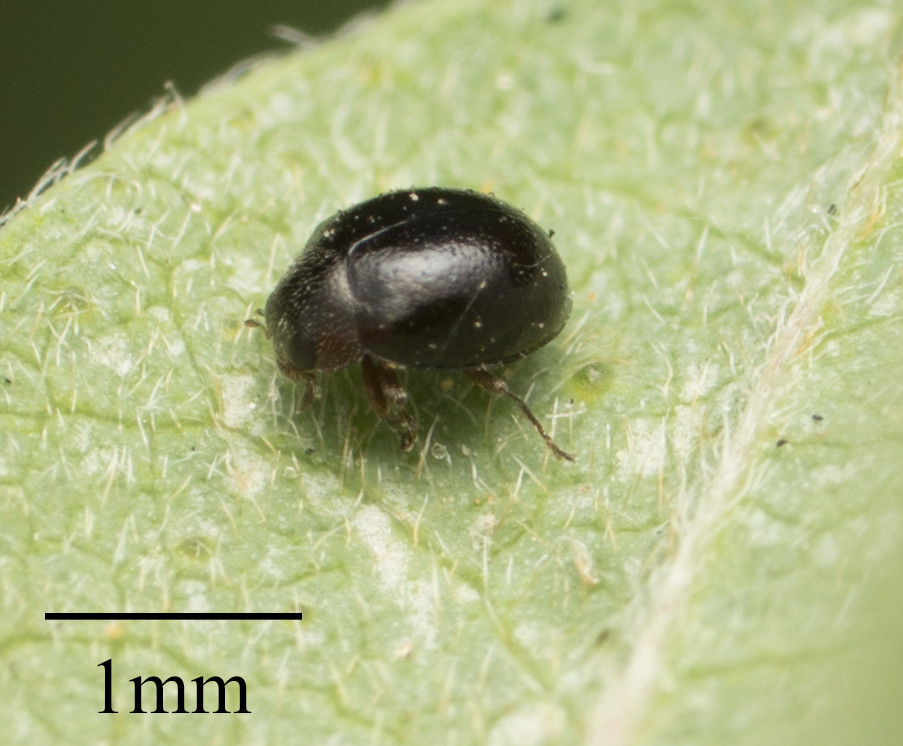

Scientific classification
- Kingdom: Animalia
- Phylum: Arthropoda
- Clade: Pancrustacea
- Class: Insecta
- Order: Coleoptera
- Suborder: Polyphaga
- Infraorder: Cucujiformia
- Family: Coccinellidae
- Genus: Zilus
- Species: Z. aterrimus

Binomial name
- Zilus aterrimus (Horn, 1895)

Synonyms
- Scymnillus aterrimus Horn, 1895; Scymnillus cochisiensis Nunenmacher, 1912

= Zilus aterrimus =

Species of beetle

Zilus aterrimus is a species of lady beetle in the family Coccinellidae. It is found in North America, where it has been recorded from Idaho and Washington to California and Arizona.

== Description ==
Adults reach a length of about 1.25-1.60 mm. They have a reddish brown body, while the antennae, mouthparts and legs are yellowish brown.
