= Parastethorus dichiapiculus =

Scientific classification
- Kingdom: Animalia
- Phylum: Arthropoda
- Clade: Pancrustacea
- Class: Insecta
- Order: Coleoptera
- Suborder: Polyphaga
- Infraorder: Cucujiformia
- Family: Coccinellidae
- Genus: Parastethorus
- Species: P. dichiapiculus

Binomial name
- Parastethorus dichiapiculus (Xiao & Li, 1993)

Synonyms
- Stethorus dichiapiculus Xiao & Li, 1993

Species of beetle

Parastethorus dichiapiculus is a species of beetle of the family Coccinellidae. It is found in China (Chongqing, Sichuan, Guangdong).

== Description ==
Adults reach a length of about 1.2–1.28 mm (0.047–0.050 in). The dorsum and underside are entirely black, except for the yellowish brown antennae, mouthparts and legs.
