= Zilus eleutherae =

Scientific classification
- Kingdom: Animalia
- Phylum: Arthropoda
- Clade: Pancrustacea
- Class: Insecta
- Order: Coleoptera
- Suborder: Polyphaga
- Infraorder: Cucujiformia
- Family: Coccinellidae
- Genus: Zilus
- Species: Z. eleutherae

Binomial name
- Zilus eleutherae (Casey, 1899)

Synonyms
- Scymnillus eleutherae Casey, 1899

Species of beetle

Zilus eleutherae is a species of lady beetle in the family Coccinellidae. It is found in the Caribbean and North America. It is found on the Bahamas and in Florida.

== Description ==
Adults reach a length of about 0.90-1 mm. They have a purplish black body. The lateral border of the pronotum, ventral surface and most of the legs are dark brown and the antennae, mouthparts and tarsus are yellow.
