= Parastethorus platyphyllus =

Scientific classification
- Kingdom: Animalia
- Phylum: Arthropoda
- Clade: Pancrustacea
- Class: Insecta
- Order: Coleoptera
- Suborder: Polyphaga
- Infraorder: Cucujiformia
- Family: Coccinellidae
- Genus: Parastethorus
- Species: P. platyphyllus

Binomial name
- Parastethorus platyphyllus Li et al., 2015

Species of beetle

Parastethorus platyphyllus is a species of beetle of the family Coccinellidae. It is found in China (Guangdong).

== Description ==
Adults reach a length of about 1.17–1.2 mm (0.046–0.047 in). The dorsum and underside are entirely black, except for the yellowish brown antennae, mouthparts and legs.

== Etymology ==
The species name is derived from Latin and refers to the broad penis guide in ventral view.
