= Scymnodes magnus =

Scientific classification
- Kingdom: Animalia
- Phylum: Arthropoda
- Clade: Pancrustacea
- Class: Insecta
- Order: Coleoptera
- Suborder: Polyphaga
- Infraorder: Cucujiformia
- Family: Coccinellidae
- Genus: Scymnodes
- Species: S. magnus

Binomial name
- Scymnodes magnus Poorani & Ślipiński, 2009

Species of beetle

Scymnodes magnus is a species of beetle of the family Coccinellidae. It is found in Papua New Guinea.

== Description ==
Adults reach a length of about 6.5 mm (0.26 in). They have an elongate-oval body. The head is reddish testaceous and the pronotum is testaceous with a black marking. The elytra are black with metallic bluish violet reflections and with the apical area testaceous. The ventral surface is black, but the antennae are testaceous.

== Etymology ==
The species name refers to the large size of the species.
