= Ponaria caerulea =

Scientific classification
- Kingdom: Animalia
- Phylum: Arthropoda
- Clade: Pancrustacea
- Class: Insecta
- Order: Coleoptera
- Suborder: Polyphaga
- Infraorder: Cucujiformia
- Family: Coccinellidae
- Genus: Ponaria
- Species: P. caerulea

Binomial name
- Ponaria caerulea (Gorham, 1899)

Synonyms
- Neaporia caerulea Gorham, 1899

Species of beetle

Ponaria caerulea is a species of beetle of the family Coccinellidae. It is found in Panama.

== Description ==
Adults reach a length of about 1.7 mm. Adults are bluish black, with a black head and pronotum.
