= Ponaria paprzyckii =

Scientific classification
- Kingdom: Animalia
- Phylum: Arthropoda
- Clade: Pancrustacea
- Class: Insecta
- Order: Coleoptera
- Suborder: Polyphaga
- Infraorder: Cucujiformia
- Family: Coccinellidae
- Genus: Ponaria
- Species: P. paprzyckii

Binomial name
- Ponaria paprzyckii Gordon & Hanley, 2017

Species of beetle

Ponaria paprzyckii is a species of beetle of the family Coccinellidae. It is found in Peru.

== Description ==
Adults reach a length of about 1.9–2.0 mm. Adults are black.
