= Psorolyma cyanella =

Scientific classification
- Kingdom: Animalia
- Phylum: Arthropoda
- Clade: Pancrustacea
- Class: Insecta
- Order: Coleoptera
- Suborder: Polyphaga
- Infraorder: Cucujiformia
- Family: Coccinellidae
- Genus: Psorolyma
- Species: P. cyanella

Binomial name
- Psorolyma cyanella Gordon, 1974

Species of beetle

Psorolyma cyanella is a species of beetle of the family Coccinellidae. It is found in the Dominican Republic and Haiti.

== Description ==
Adults reach a length of about 1.98–2.39 mm. Adults are black, the head with a violet metallic sheen, the pronotum with a greenish violet metallic sheen and the elytron with a green metallic sheen.
