= Apolinus jaya =

Scientific classification
- Kingdom: Animalia
- Phylum: Arthropoda
- Clade: Pancrustacea
- Class: Insecta
- Order: Coleoptera
- Suborder: Polyphaga
- Infraorder: Cucujiformia
- Family: Coccinellidae
- Genus: Apolinus
- Species: A. jaya

Binomial name
- Apolinus jaya Poorani & Ślipiński, 2009

Species of beetle

Apolinus jaya is a species of beetle of the family Coccinellidae. It is found in Indonesia (Irian Jaya).

== Description ==
Adults reach a length of about 3.5 mm (0.14 in). They have an elongate-oval body. The head is yellow with a black marking and the pronotum is yellow, also with a black marking. The elytra are black with testaceous apices. The ventral surface is dark pitchy brown to black, while the antennae are yellowish testaceous.

== Etymology ==
The species name refers to the type locality.
