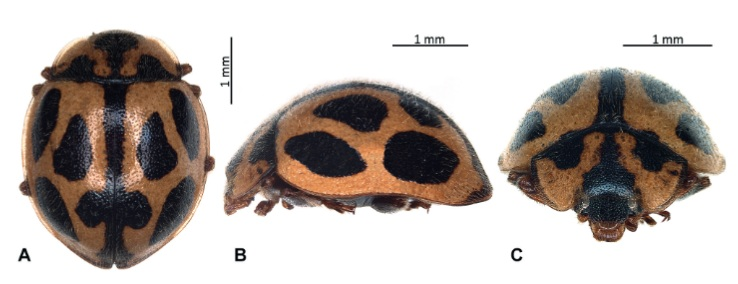
- Eupalea borowieci

Scientific classification
- Kingdom: Animalia
- Phylum: Arthropoda
- Clade: Pancrustacea
- Class: Insecta
- Order: Coleoptera
- Suborder: Polyphaga
- Infraorder: Cucujiformia
- Family: Coccinellidae
- Tribe: Coccidulini
- Genus: Eupalea; Mulsant, 1850

= Eupalea =

Genus of insects

Eupalea is a genus of beetles belonging to the family Coccinellidae.

== Species ==
- Eupalea andicola
- Eupalea aurantia
- Eupalea boliviana
- Eupalea borowieci
- Eupalea clarki
- Eupalea colombiensis
- Eupalea conglomerata
- Eupalea formosa
- Eupalea fryii
- Eupalea melzeri
- Eupalea mniszechii
- Eupalea picta
- Eupalea pulchra
- Eupalea reinhardtii
- Eupalea reticularis
- Eupalea suffriani
- Eupalea venusta
