= Parastethorus =

Scientific classification
- Kingdom: Animalia
- Phylum: Arthropoda
- Clade: Pancrustacea
- Class: Insecta
- Order: Coleoptera
- Suborder: Polyphaga
- Infraorder: Cucujiformia
- Family: Coccinellidae
- Tribe: Coccidulini
- Genus: Parastethorus; Pang & Mao, 1975

Genus of insects

Parastethorus is a genus of beetles belonging to the family Coccinellidae.

== Species ==
- Parastethorus baiyunshanensis
- Parastethorus biconvexus
- Parastethorus dichiapiculus
- Parastethorus grandoaperturus
- Parastethorus guangxiensis
- Parastethorus gutierrezi
- Parastethorus hanoiensis
- Parastethorus histrio
- Parastethorus indira
- Parastethorus malaicus
- Parastethorus miniaperturus
- Parastethorus nigripes
- Parastethorus obscuripennis
- Parastethorus pinicola
- Parastethorus platyphyllus
- Parastethorus truncatus
- Parastethorus yunnanensis
