= Psorolyma sicardi =

Scientific classification
- Kingdom: Animalia
- Phylum: Arthropoda
- Clade: Pancrustacea
- Class: Insecta
- Order: Coleoptera
- Suborder: Polyphaga
- Infraorder: Cucujiformia
- Family: Coccinellidae
- Genus: Psorolyma
- Species: P. sicardi

Binomial name
- Psorolyma sicardi Gordon, 1974

Species of beetle

Psorolyma sicardi is a species of beetle of the family Coccinellidae. It is found in Jamaica.

== Description ==
Adults reach a length of about 2-2.31 mm. Adults are yellow. The elytron has two large black spots.
