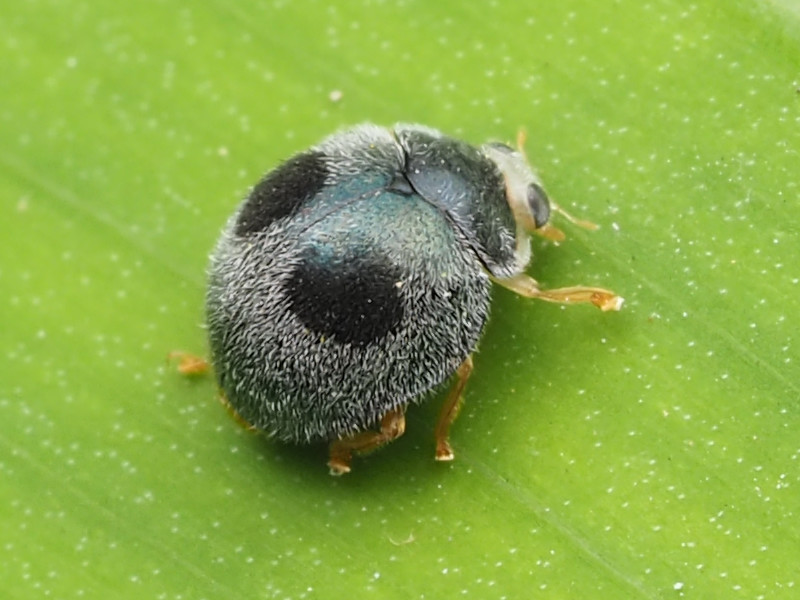
- Azya orbigera

Scientific classification
- Kingdom: Animalia
- Phylum: Arthropoda
- Clade: Pancrustacea
- Class: Insecta
- Order: Coleoptera
- Suborder: Polyphaga
- Infraorder: Cucujiformia
- Family: Coccinellidae
- Tribe: Coccidulini
- Genus: Azya; Mulsant, 1850

= Azya =

Genus of beetles

Azya is a genus of lady beetles in the family Coccinellidae. There are about 12 described species in Azya.

== Species ==
These 12 species belong to the genus Azya:

- Azya bioculata Gordon
- Azya elegans Gordon
- Azya exuta Gordon
- Azya ilicis Almeida & Carvalho, 1996
- Azya imitator Gordon, 1980
- Azya luteipes Mulsant, 1850
- Azya mexicana Gordon
- Azya mulsanti Gordon
- Azya murilloi Gordon
- Azya orbigera Mulsant, 1850 (globe-marked lady beetle)
- Azya satipoi Gordon
- Azya scutata Mulsant, 1850
- Azya weyrauchi Gordon
