= Neorhizobius =

Scientific classification
- Kingdom: Animalia
- Phylum: Arthropoda
- Clade: Pancrustacea
- Class: Insecta
- Order: Coleoptera
- Suborder: Polyphaga
- Infraorder: Cucujiformia
- Family: Coccinellidae
- Tribe: Coccidulini
- Genus: Neorhizobius; Crotch, 1874

Genus of insects

Neorhizobius is a genus of beetles belonging to the family Coccinellidae.

== Species ==
- Neorhizobius barrigai González, 2013
- Neorhizobius coquimbensis González & Gordon, 2007
- Neorhizobius fuegensis Brèthes, 1925
- Neorhizobius robustus González & Gordon, 2007
- Neorhizobius sanguinolentus (Germain, 1854)
