= Apolinus rotundus =

Scientific classification
- Kingdom: Animalia
- Phylum: Arthropoda
- Clade: Pancrustacea
- Class: Insecta
- Order: Coleoptera
- Suborder: Polyphaga
- Infraorder: Cucujiformia
- Family: Coccinellidae
- Genus: Apolinus
- Species: A. rotundus

Binomial name
- Apolinus rotundus (Blackburn, 1889)

Synonyms
- Eupalea rotunda Blackburn, 1889

Species of beetle

Apolinus rotundus is a species of beetle of the family Coccinellidae. It is found in Australia (Australian Capital Territory, New South Wales, Western Australia).

== Description ==
Adults reach a length of about 1.75–2 mm (0.069–0.079 in). They have an elongate to short oval, convex body, covered with silvery white pubescence. The head is reddish brown to testaceous and the pronotum is testaceous with a fuscous or blackish marking. The scutellum is black and the elytra are dark brown to black with the lateral margins lighter testaceous. The ventral surface is mostly reddish-testaceous.
