= Parastethorus hanoiensis =

Scientific classification
- Kingdom: Animalia
- Phylum: Arthropoda
- Clade: Pancrustacea
- Class: Insecta
- Order: Coleoptera
- Suborder: Polyphaga
- Infraorder: Cucujiformia
- Family: Coccinellidae
- Genus: Parastethorus
- Species: P. hanoiensis

Binomial name
- Parastethorus hanoiensis (Hoang, 1982)

Synonyms
- Stethorus hanoiensis Hoang, 1982

Species of beetle

Parastethorus hanoiensis is a species of beetle of the family Coccinellidae. It is found in Vietnam.
