= Apolinus irian =

Scientific classification
- Kingdom: Animalia
- Phylum: Arthropoda
- Clade: Pancrustacea
- Class: Insecta
- Order: Coleoptera
- Suborder: Polyphaga
- Infraorder: Cucujiformia
- Family: Coccinellidae
- Genus: Apolinus
- Species: A. irian

Binomial name
- Apolinus irian Poorani & Ślipiński, 2009

Species of beetle

Apolinus irian is a species of beetle of the family Coccinellidae. It is found in Papua New Guinea and Indonesia (Irian Jaya).

== Description ==
Adults reach a length of about 2.9–3.5 mm (0.11–0.14 in). They have an elongate-oval, convex body. The head is yellow or black with two yellowish-testaceous spots. The pronotum is mostly black or yellow with a dark brown to black marking. The elytra are dark metallic green or purple with greenish and coppery iridescence.

== Etymology ==
The species name refers to the type locality.
