= Gordonita tijeoi =

Scientific classification
- Kingdom: Animalia
- Phylum: Arthropoda
- Clade: Pancrustacea
- Class: Insecta
- Order: Coleoptera
- Suborder: Polyphaga
- Infraorder: Cucujiformia
- Family: Coccinellidae
- Genus: Gordonita
- Species: G. tijeoi

Binomial name
- Gordonita tijeoi Churata & Almeida, 2026

Species of beetle

Gordonita tijeoi is a species of beetle of the family Coccinellidae. It is found in Peru.

== Description ==
Adults reach a length of about 2.89 mm (0.114 in). They have a rounded body with thin, short, whitish pubescence. The integument is yellow with black spots. The head is black, with the antennae and mouthparts yellowish. The pronotum is yellow with a black spot in the middle and the scutellar shield is black. The elytra are yellowish with black spots. The legs are brownish.

== Etymology ==
The species is named in honour of José Tijé Huarao, one of the last leaders of the indigenous Harakbut town and founder of the Arasaeri native community, in Madre de Dios (Peru).
