= Scymnodes bellus =

Scientific classification
- Kingdom: Animalia
- Phylum: Arthropoda
- Clade: Pancrustacea
- Class: Insecta
- Order: Coleoptera
- Suborder: Polyphaga
- Infraorder: Cucujiformia
- Family: Coccinellidae
- Genus: Scymnodes
- Species: S. bellus

Binomial name
- Scymnodes bellus Pope & Lawrence, 1990

Species of beetle

Scymnodes bellus is a species of beetle of the family Coccinellidae. It is found in Australia (Australian Capital Territory, New South Wales, Victoria).

== Description ==
Adults reach a length of about 3.75–4 mm (0.148–0.157 in). They have an oblong-oval, convex body. They are covered with silvery white pubescence, forming a symmetrical pattern. The dorsum is black, with yellowish-testaceous antennae. The ventral surface is mostly black.

== Life history ==
The larvae have been found with ants of the Iridomyrmex genus on Eucalyptus. They possibly also feed on coccoids.
