= Apolinus cribratus =

Scientific classification
- Kingdom: Animalia
- Phylum: Arthropoda
- Clade: Pancrustacea
- Class: Insecta
- Order: Coleoptera
- Suborder: Polyphaga
- Infraorder: Cucujiformia
- Family: Coccinellidae
- Genus: Apolinus
- Species: A. cribratus

Binomial name
- Apolinus cribratus (Blackburn, 1895)

Synonyms
- Platyomus cribratus Blackburn, 1895

Species of beetle

Apolinus cribratus is a species of beetle of the family Coccinellidae. It is found in Australia (Queensland).

== Description ==
Adults reach a length of about 2.5–3.5 mm (0.098–0.138 in). They have an elongate oval, convex body. The dorsal surface is covered with silvery white pubescence. The head is yellow with a black marking. The pronotum is bright luteous-yellow with a black marking. The scutellum and elytra are black. The ventral surface is dark brown to black, but the antennae are yellowish brown.
