= Scymnodes consimilis =

Scientific classification
- Kingdom: Animalia
- Phylum: Arthropoda
- Clade: Pancrustacea
- Class: Insecta
- Order: Coleoptera
- Suborder: Polyphaga
- Infraorder: Cucujiformia
- Family: Coccinellidae
- Genus: Scymnodes
- Species: S. consimilis

Binomial name
- Scymnodes consimilis (Blackburn, 1895)

Synonyms
- Platyomus consimilis Blackburn, 1895

Species of beetle

Scymnodes consimilis is a species of beetle of the family Coccinellidae. It is found in Australia (Queensland, New South Wales, South Australia).

== Description ==
Adults reach a length of about 2.5–3 mm (0.098–0.118 in). They have an oblong-oval, weakly convex body. They are covered with dense silvery white pubescence. The head is black and the pronotum is usually also black, but sometimes dark reddish brown with black patches, or even completely dark reddish with a dark brown to black border. The elytra are black with a yellow-orange marking. The legs and abdomen are yellowish testaceous.
