= Apolinus longicornis =

Scientific classification
- Kingdom: Animalia
- Phylum: Arthropoda
- Clade: Pancrustacea
- Class: Insecta
- Order: Coleoptera
- Suborder: Polyphaga
- Infraorder: Cucujiformia
- Family: Coccinellidae
- Genus: Apolinus
- Species: A. longicornis

Binomial name
- Apolinus longicornis (Weise, 1917)

Synonyms
- Scymnodes longicornis Weise, 1917

Species of beetle

Apolinus longicornis is a species of beetle of the family Coccinellidae. It is found in Papua New Guinea and Indonesia (Irian Jaya).

== Description ==
Adults reach a length of about 3.5–4 mm (0.14–0.16 in). They have an elongate, broadly oval body. The dorsal surface is covered with whitish pubescence. The head is yellowish to testaceous and the pronotum is yellowish-testaceous with a black marking. The elytra are dark pitchy brown to black with metallic, dark aeneous reflections. The ventral surface is yellowish brown to testaceous.
