= Ponaria (beetle) =

Scientific classification
- Kingdom: Animalia
- Phylum: Arthropoda
- Clade: Pancrustacea
- Class: Insecta
- Order: Coleoptera
- Suborder: Polyphaga
- Infraorder: Cucujiformia
- Family: Coccinellidae
- Tribe: Coccidulini
- Genus: Ponaria; Gordon & Hanley, 2017

Genus of beetles

Ponaria is a genus of minute lady beetles in the family Coccinellidae.

== Species ==
- Ponaria caerulea (Gorham, 1899)
- Ponaria daviesi Gordon & Hanley, 2017
- Ponaria hurtadoi Gordon & Hanley, 2017
- Ponaria paprzyckii Gordon & Hanley, 2017
