= Siola karpish =

Scientific classification
- Kingdom: Animalia
- Phylum: Arthropoda
- Clade: Pancrustacea
- Class: Insecta
- Order: Coleoptera
- Suborder: Polyphaga
- Infraorder: Cucujiformia
- Family: Coccinellidae
- Genus: Siola
- Species: S. karpish

Binomial name
- Siola karpish González & Větrovec, 2021

Species of beetle

Siola karpish is a species of beetle of the family Coccinellidae. It is found in Peru (Amazonas, Huánuco).

== Description ==
Adults reach a length of about 2.8–3 mm (0.11–0.12 in). The head is black, while the antennae are yellowish brown. The pronotum is black with a greenish metallic sheen and with the anterior border yellow. The scutellum is black and the elytra are black with a greenish metallic sheen. The ventral surface is black and the abdomen is mostly yellowish-brown. The legs are mostly yellow. The pubescence is yellowish white.

== Etymology ==
The species is named after the Karpish Tunnel, the collection site of the holotype.
