= Nephaspis oculata =

Scientific classification
- Kingdom: Animalia
- Phylum: Arthropoda
- Clade: Pancrustacea
- Class: Insecta
- Order: Coleoptera
- Suborder: Polyphaga
- Infraorder: Cucujiformia
- Family: Coccinellidae
- Genus: Nephaspis
- Species: N. oculata

Binomial name
- Nephaspis oculata (Blatchley, 1917)

Synonyms
- Scymnus oculatus Blatchley, 1917; Nephaspis oculatus; Clitostethus oculatus; Nephaspis amnicola Wingo, 1952

Species of beetle

Nephaspis oculata is a species of dusky lady beetle in the family Coccinellidae. It is found in North America, where it has been recorded from Texas, Louisiana, Florida, Iowa and New Hampshire, where it acts as a biological control agent of whiteflies.

== Description ==
Adults reach a length of about 1.19-1.48 mm. They have a yellow body. The elytron is usually piceous to black along base and lateral margin, while the central area is yellowish brown.

== See also ==
- Coccinellidae
- Biological pest control
- Whitefly
