= Nephaspis nigra =

Scientific classification
- Kingdom: Animalia
- Phylum: Arthropoda
- Clade: Pancrustacea
- Class: Insecta
- Order: Coleoptera
- Suborder: Polyphaga
- Infraorder: Cucujiformia
- Family: Coccinellidae
- Genus: Nephaspis
- Species: N. nigra

Binomial name
- Nephaspis nigra Gordon, 1978

Species of beetle

Nephaspis nigra is a species of beetle of the family Coccinellidae. It is found in Trinidad.

== Description ==
Adults reach a length of about 1.36 mm. Adults are black, while the head, pronotum and legs are pale yellow.

== Etymology ==
The species name refers to the black colour of the species.
