= Scymnodes riedeli =

Scientific classification
- Kingdom: Animalia
- Phylum: Arthropoda
- Clade: Pancrustacea
- Class: Insecta
- Order: Coleoptera
- Suborder: Polyphaga
- Infraorder: Cucujiformia
- Family: Coccinellidae
- Genus: Scymnodes
- Species: S. riedeli

Binomial name
- Scymnodes riedeli Poorani & Ślipiński, 2009

Species of beetle

Scymnodes riedeli is a species of beetle of the family Coccinellidae. It is found in Indonesia (Irian Jaya).

== Description ==
Adults reach a length of about 4 mm (0.16 in). They have a broadly oval body. The dorsal surface is covered with silvery white pubescence. The head is reddish-testaceous and the pronotum is black with the anterior and lateral margins testaceous. The elytra are black with the apical area reddish-testaceous. The ventral surface and antennae are reddish brown-testaceous.

== Etymology ==
The species is named in honour of Dr. Alexander Riedel.
