= Pseudoryssomus pumilus =

Scientific classification
- Kingdom: Animalia
- Phylum: Arthropoda
- Clade: Pancrustacea
- Class: Insecta
- Order: Coleoptera
- Suborder: Polyphaga
- Infraorder: Cucujiformia
- Family: Coccinellidae
- Genus: Pseudoryssomus
- Species: P. pumilus

Binomial name
- Pseudoryssomus pumilus Gordon, 1974

Species of beetle

Pseudoryssomus pumilus is a species of beetle of the family Coccinellidae. It is found in Panama.

== Description ==
Adults reach a length of about 3.58 mm. Adults are brownish yellow. The pronotum is reddish yellow with a pale yellow anterior border and an oval black spot. The elytron is black with two large reddish yellow spots.
