= Nephaspis =

Scientific classification
- Kingdom: Animalia
- Phylum: Arthropoda
- Clade: Pancrustacea
- Class: Insecta
- Order: Coleoptera
- Suborder: Polyphaga
- Infraorder: Cucujiformia
- Family: Coccinellidae
- Tribe: Coccidulini
- Genus: Nephaspis; Casey, 1899

Synonyms
- Nephasis Korschefsky, 1931 (misspell.)

Genus of beetles

Nephaspis is a genus of minute lady beetles in the family Coccinellidae.

== Species ==
- Nephaspis andromeda
- Nephaspis antlia
- Nephaspis apus
- Nephaspis aquarius
- Nephaspis aquila
- Nephaspis ara
- Nephaspis aries
- Nephaspis bicolor
- Nephaspis bootes
- Nephaspis caelum
- Nephaspis cancer
- Nephaspis capricornus
- Nephaspis carina
- Nephaspis centaurus
- Nephaspis cepheus
- Nephaspis cetus
- Nephaspis chamaeleon
- Nephaspis circinus
- Nephaspis cocois
- Nephaspis convexa
- Nephaspis crux
- Nephaspis cygnus
- Nephaspis delphinus
- Nephaspis dispar
- Nephaspis dorado
- Nephaspis draco
- Nephaspis equuleus
- Nephaspis eridanus
- Nephaspis fornax
- Nephaspis gemini
- Nephaspis gorhami
- Nephaspis grus
- Nephaspis horologium
- Nephaspis hydra
- Nephaspis indus
- Nephaspis isabelae
- Nephaspis lacerta
- Nephaspis lynx
- Nephaspis maesi
- Nephaspis magnopunctata
- Nephaspis namolica
- Nephaspis nigra
- Nephaspis oculata
- Nephaspis picturata
- Nephaspis torresi
