= Siola =

Scientific classification
- Kingdom: Animalia
- Phylum: Arthropoda
- Clade: Pancrustacea
- Class: Insecta
- Order: Coleoptera
- Suborder: Polyphaga
- Infraorder: Cucujiformia
- Family: Coccinellidae
- Tribe: Coccidulini
- Genus: Siola; Mulsant, 1850

Genus of beetles

Siola is a genus of lady beetles in the family Coccinellidae. There are about two described species in Siola.

== Species ==
- Siola atra González, 2015
- Siola boillaei Mulsant, 1850
- Siola garnieri Mulsant, 1850
- Siola karpish González & Větrovec, 2021
