= Pseudoryssomus brevipilosus =

Scientific classification
- Kingdom: Animalia
- Phylum: Arthropoda
- Clade: Pancrustacea
- Class: Insecta
- Order: Coleoptera
- Suborder: Polyphaga
- Infraorder: Cucujiformia
- Family: Coccinellidae
- Genus: Pseudoryssomus
- Species: P. brevipilosus

Binomial name
- Pseudoryssomus brevipilosus Gordon, 1974

Species of beetle

Pseudoryssomus brevipilosus is a species of beetle of the family Coccinellidae. It is found in Venezuela.

== Description ==
Adults reach a length of about 3.45 mm. Adults are brownish red. The pronotum is red with a dark brown spot. The lateral half of the elytron is red, while the median half is dark brown.
