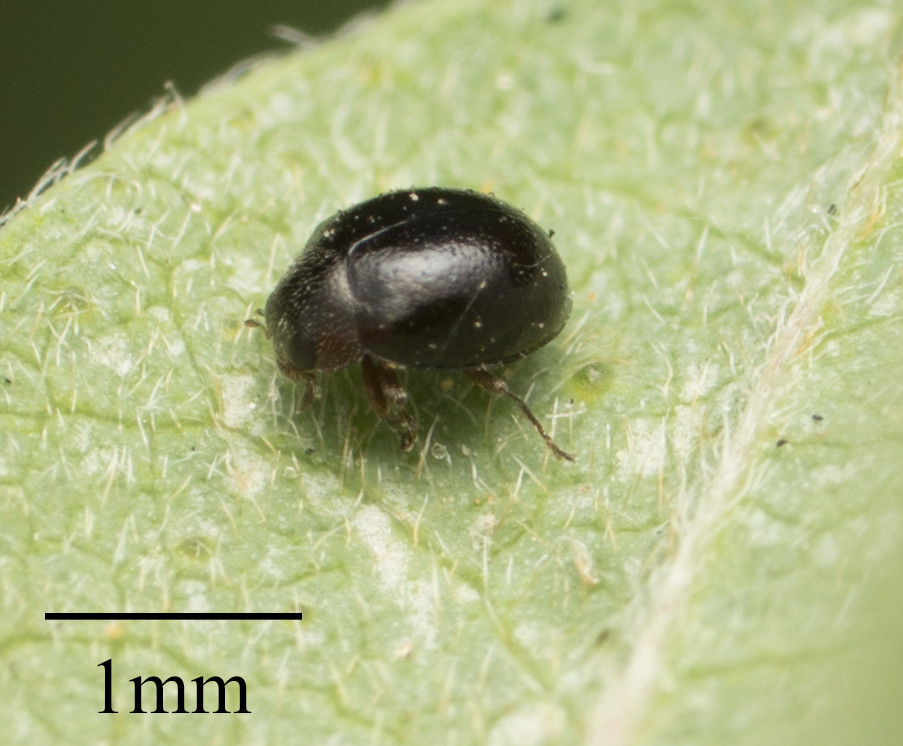
- Zilus aterrimus

Scientific classification
- Kingdom: Animalia
- Phylum: Arthropoda
- Clade: Pancrustacea
- Class: Insecta
- Order: Coleoptera
- Suborder: Polyphaga
- Infraorder: Cucujiformia
- Family: Coccinellidae
- Tribe: Coccidulini
- Genus: Zilus; Mulsant, 1850

Synonyms
- Scymnillus Horn, 1895; Scymnillodes Sicard, 1922

= Zilus =

Genus of beetles

Zilus is a genus of lady beetles in the family Coccinellidae.

== Species of the United States ==
These species belong to the genus Zilus:

- Zilus aeneus (Sicard, 1922)
- Zilus aterrimus (Horn, 1895)
- Zilus atrox (Chapin, 1930)
- Zilus badius (Weise, 1929)
- Zilus barbosi Segarra, 2021
- Zilus bruneri (Chapin, 1930)
- Zilus caeruleicollis (Champion, 1913)
- Zilus caseyi (Chapin, 1930)
- Zilus cyanescens (Sicard, 1922)
- Zilus eleutherae (Casey, 1899)
- Zilus fulvipes (Mulsant, 1850)
- Zilus gilvifrons (Chapin, 1930)
- Zilus horni Gordon, 1985
- Zilus inexpectatus González & Aguilera, 2009
- Zilus iris (Chapin, 1930)
- Zilus lateralis (Casey, 1899)
- Zilus miroi González & Aguilera, 2009
- Zilus splendidus (Chapin, 1930)
- Zilus subtropicus (Casey, 1924)
- Zilus variipennis (Sicard, 1922)
- Zilus viridimicans (Sicard, 1922)
