= Parastethorus malaicus =

Scientific classification
- Kingdom: Animalia
- Phylum: Arthropoda
- Clade: Pancrustacea
- Class: Insecta
- Order: Coleoptera
- Suborder: Polyphaga
- Infraorder: Cucujiformia
- Family: Coccinellidae
- Genus: Parastethorus
- Species: P. malaicus

Binomial name
- Parastethorus malaicus (Xiao & Li, 1993)

Synonyms
- Stethorus malaicus Xiao & Li, 1993

Species of beetle

Parastethorus malaicus is a species of beetle of the family Coccinellidae. It is found in China (Guizhou, Sichuan).

== Description ==
Adults reach a length of about 1.17 mm (0.046 in). The dorsum and underside are entirely black, except for the yellowish brown antennae, mouthparts and legs.
