= Oryssomus =

Scientific classification
- Kingdom: Animalia
- Phylum: Arthropoda
- Clade: Pancrustacea
- Class: Insecta
- Order: Coleoptera
- Suborder: Polyphaga
- Infraorder: Cucujiformia
- Family: Coccinellidae
- Tribe: Coccidulini
- Genus: Oryssomus; Mulsant, 1850

Genus of insects

Oryssomus is a genus of beetles belonging to the family Coccinellidae.

== Species ==
- Oryssomus calix Almeida & Santos, 2014
- Oryssomus guillermo Almeida & Santos, 2014
- Oryssomus guyanensis Almeida & Santos, 2014
- Oryssomus lineatus Gordon, 1974
- Oryssomus paschoali Almeida & Santos, 2014
- Oryssomus rhombus Almeida & Santos, 2014
- Oryssomus rogeri Almeida & Santos, 2014
- Oryssomus subterminatus Mulsant, 1850
- Oryssomus unimaculatus Almeida & Lima, 1995
