= Scymnodes difficilis =

Scientific classification
- Kingdom: Animalia
- Phylum: Arthropoda
- Clade: Pancrustacea
- Class: Insecta
- Order: Coleoptera
- Suborder: Polyphaga
- Infraorder: Cucujiformia
- Family: Coccinellidae
- Genus: Scymnodes
- Species: S. difficilis

Binomial name
- Scymnodes difficilis Blackburn, 1889

Species of beetle

Scymnodes difficilis is a species of beetle of the family Coccinellidae. It is found in Australia (New South Wales, South Australia, Victoria).

== Description ==
Adults reach a length of about 3.12–3.84 mm (0.123–0.151 in). They have an narrow, elongate-oval, moderately convex body. The head is mostly black and the pronotum is reddish testaceous, but black medially and with the lateral grooves dark brown. The scutellum is black and the elytra are dark pitchy brown to black, with a metallic coppery sheen. The pronotum and elytra are covered with dense pubescence.
