= Parastethorus histrio =

Scientific classification
- Kingdom: Animalia
- Phylum: Arthropoda
- Clade: Pancrustacea
- Class: Insecta
- Order: Coleoptera
- Suborder: Polyphaga
- Infraorder: Cucujiformia
- Family: Coccinellidae
- Genus: Parastethorus
- Species: P. histrio

Binomial name
- Parastethorus histrio (Chazeau, 1974)

Synonyms
- Stethorus histrio Chazeau, 1974; Stethorus incompletus Chazeau, 1979

Species of beetle

Parastethorus histrio is a species of beetle of the family Coccinellidae. It is found in Réunion, Chile and Mexico.

== Description ==
Adults reach a length of about 1-3 mm. Adults are black with yellow antennae and legs.
