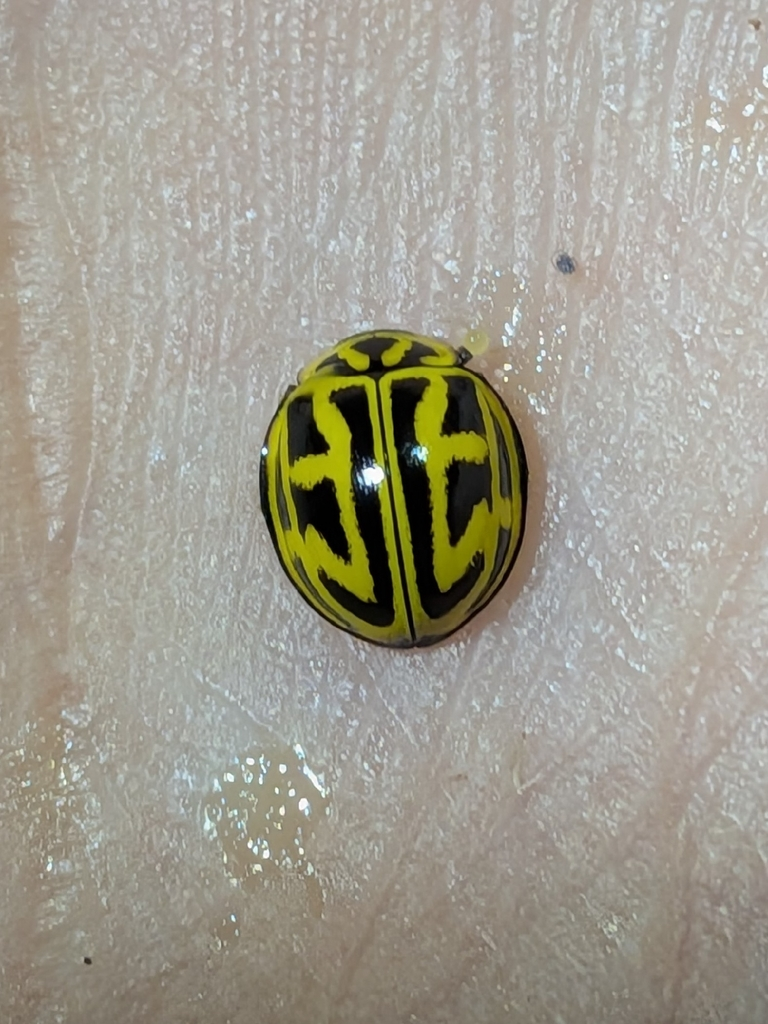

Scientific classification
- Kingdom: Animalia
- Phylum: Arthropoda
- Clade: Pancrustacea
- Class: Insecta
- Order: Coleoptera
- Suborder: Polyphaga
- Infraorder: Cucujiformia
- Family: Coccinellidae
- Genus: Archegleis
- Species: A. interrupta

Binomial name
- Archegleis interrupta (Weise, 1926)

Synonyms
- Egleis interrupta Weise, 1926

= Archegleis interrupta =

Species of beetle

Archegleis interrupta is a species of beetle of the family Coccinellidae. It is found in Australia (northern Queensland).

== Description ==
Adults reach a length of about 5–5.9 mm (0.20–0.23 in). They have a greenish-yellow body, with a black pattern. The head is pale yellow with two black marks. The scutellum is black and the elytra are greenish-yellow, with a black pattern and external borders. The anterior and middle legs are pale with dark areas, while the hindlegs are dark.
