= Apolinus terminalis =

Scientific classification
- Kingdom: Animalia
- Phylum: Arthropoda
- Clade: Pancrustacea
- Class: Insecta
- Order: Coleoptera
- Suborder: Polyphaga
- Infraorder: Cucujiformia
- Family: Coccinellidae
- Genus: Apolinus
- Species: A. terminalis

Binomial name
- Apolinus terminalis (Blackburn, 1895)

Synonyms
- Platyomus terminalis Blackburn, 1895; Scymnodes spilotus Weise, 1923; Scymnodes papuanus Weise, 1917; Scymnodes punctiger Weise, 1917

Species of beetle

Apolinus terminalis is a species of beetle of the family Coccinellidae. It is found in Australia (Queensland, Hammond Island New South Wales, Northern Territory), Papua New Guinea and Indonesia (Western New Guinea, Kai Islands).

== Description ==
Adults reach a length of about 2.5–4 mm (0.098–0.157 in). They have a broadly oval, convex body. The dorsal surface is covered with silvery white pubescence. The head is yellowish brown to testaceous and the pronotum is testaceous with a black marking. The scutellum is black and the elytra are dark reddish brown to black with reddish brown or testaceous apices.
