= Scymnodes aciculatus =

Scientific classification
- Kingdom: Animalia
- Phylum: Arthropoda
- Clade: Pancrustacea
- Class: Insecta
- Order: Coleoptera
- Suborder: Polyphaga
- Infraorder: Cucujiformia
- Family: Coccinellidae
- Genus: Scymnodes
- Species: S. aciculatus

Binomial name
- Scymnodes aciculatus Poorani & Ślipiński, 2009

Species of beetle

Scymnodes aciculatus is a species of beetle of the family Coccinellidae. It is found in Australia (Queensland), Indonesia (Irian Jaya) and Papua New Guinea.

== Description ==
Adults reach a length of about 4.5–5 mm (0.18–0.20 in). They have an elongate oval, strongly convex body. The head is yellowish-testaceous and the pronotum is yellowish with a black marking. The scutellum is black and the elytra are black, with an apical area yellowish-testaceous. The ventral surface is dark reddish brown, but the antennae are yellowish brown to testaceous.

== Etymology ==
The species name refers to the long, needle-like apex of the penis of male genitalia.
