= Slipinskiscymnus =

Scientific classification
- Kingdom: Animalia
- Phylum: Arthropoda
- Clade: Pancrustacea
- Class: Insecta
- Order: Coleoptera
- Suborder: Polyphaga
- Infraorder: Cucujiformia
- Family: Coccinellidae
- Tribe: Coccidulini
- Genus: Slipinskiscymnus; Peng et al., 2023

Genus of beetles

Slipinskiscymnus is a genus of lady beetles in the family Coccinellidae.

== Species ==
- Slipinskiscymnus confertus Peng & Chen, 2023
- Slipinskiscymnus interstricus Peng & Chen, 2023
- Slipinskiscymnus keralensis Poorani, 2023
- Slipinskiscymnus pallidicollis (Mulsant, 1853)
- Slipinskiscymnus saciformis (Motschulsky, 1858)
- Slipinskiscymnus siculiformis Peng & Chen, 2023
- Slipinskiscymnus spiculatus Peng & Chen, 2023
