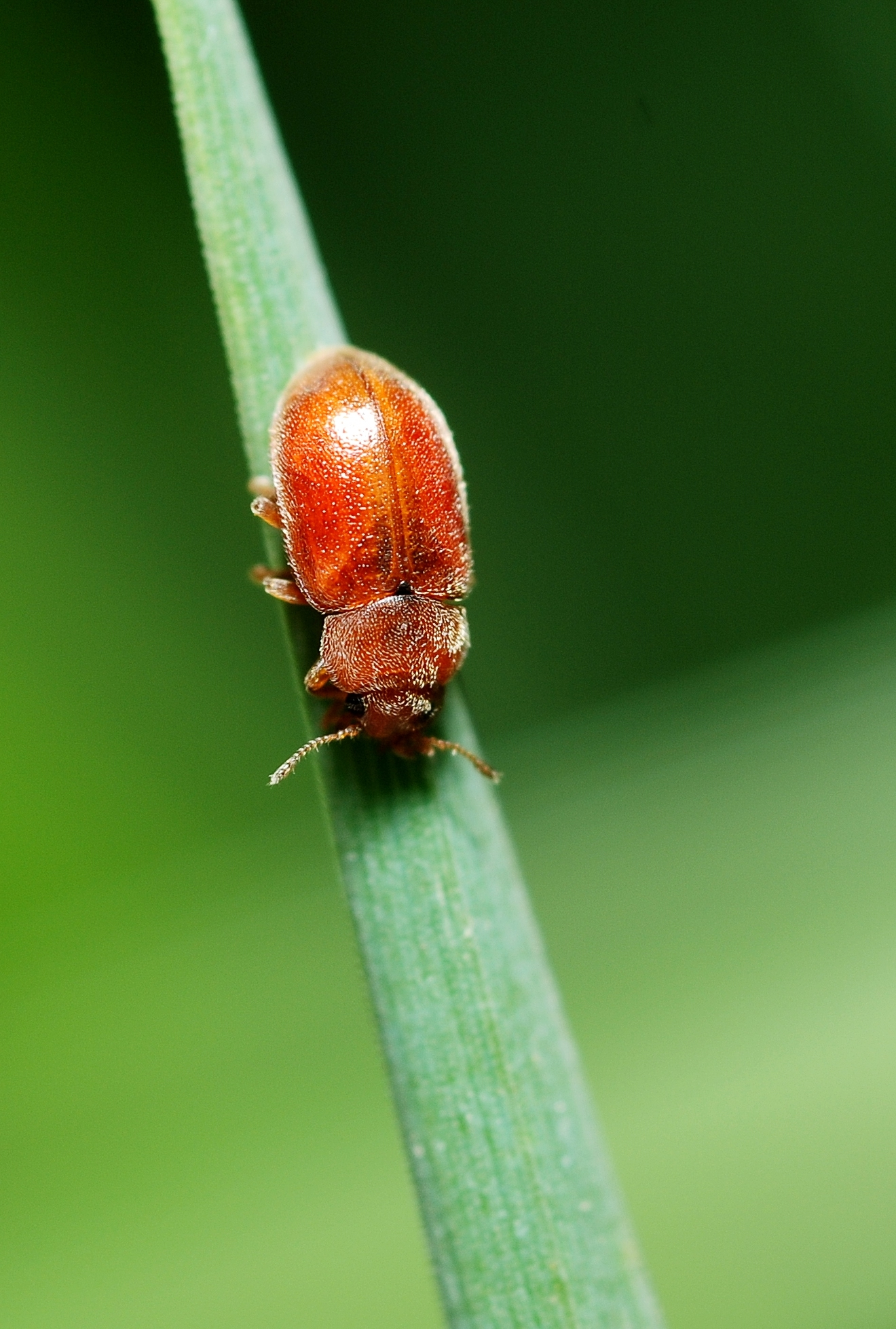
- Coccidula rufa

Scientific classification
- Kingdom: Animalia
- Phylum: Arthropoda
- Clade: Pancrustacea
- Class: Insecta
- Order: Coleoptera
- Suborder: Polyphaga
- Infraorder: Cucujiformia
- Family: Coccinellidae
- Genus: Coccidula
- Species: C. rufa

Binomial name
- Coccidula rufa Herbst, 1783

= Coccidula rufa =

Species of beetle

Coccidula rufa is a species of beetle in family Coccinellidae. It is found in the Palearctic The beetles are found throughout Europe except in the far north North Africa and East across the Palearctic - Turkey, European Russia, the Caucasus, Siberia, the Russian Far East, Belarus, Ukraine, Moldova, Transcaucasia, Kazakhstan, Middle Asia, Western Asia, Afghanistan, Mongolia. They occur to an altitude of about 1000 meters. Their preferred habitat is damp areas with swamp and water plants - slack and marshes, including peatlands but Coccidula rufa also occurs in dry biotopes (fields, meadows, sandy river banks, quarries, and gardens) They eat aphids which they hunt on aquatic plants such as cane, reed, sedges, and gramineans in the genera Glyceria and Elymus They eat aphids which they hunt on the aquatic plants, especially Hyalopterus pruni which lives not only on Prunus species such as Prunus spinosa, but also on reeds ( Phragmites australis), Arundo donax and Molinia caerulea. Overwintering takes place in the reed.
