= Star gooseberry =

The common name star gooseberry actually refers to two distinct species of plant:

- Phyllanthus acidus, the Otaheite gooseberry
- Sauropus androgynus, the katuk
