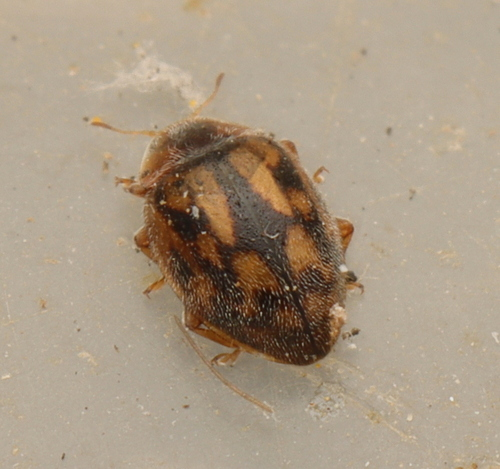
- Cranophorus notatulus

Scientific classification
- Kingdom: Animalia
- Phylum: Arthropoda
- Clade: Pancrustacea
- Class: Insecta
- Order: Coleoptera
- Suborder: Polyphaga
- Infraorder: Cucujiformia
- Family: Coccinellidae
- Subfamily: Coccidulinae
- Tribe: Coccidulini; Mulsant, 1846

Synonyms
- Azyini Mulsant, 1850; Chnoodini Mulsant, 1850; Cranophorini Mulsant, 1850; Exoplectrini Crotch, 1874; Oryssomini Gordon, 1974; Poriini Mulsant, 1850; Scymnillini Casey, 1899; Scymnini Mulsant, 1846; Zilini Gordon, 1985 (unnecessary replacement name for Scymnini); Stethorini Dobzhansky, 1924; Tetrabrachini Kapur, 1948

= Coccidulini =

Tribe of beetles

The Coccidulini are a tribe of insects within the family Coccinellidae.

== Genera ==
- Acoccidula
- Adoxellus
- Ambrocharis
- Anisorhizobius
- Apolinus
- Apseudoscymnus
- Arborantrum
- Auladoria
- Aulis
- Axinoscymnus
- Azya
- Botynella
- Bucolus
- Carinoscymnus
- Chnoodes
- Clitostethus
- Coccidula
- Coeliaria
- Cranophorus
- Cranoryssus
- Cryptolaemus
- Cyrema
- Cyrtaulis
- Dapolia
- Dioria
- Empia
- Epipleuria
- Erithionyx
- Euchre
- Eupalea
- Eupaleoides
- Exoplectra
- Geodimmockius
- Gordonita
- Gordonoryssomus
- Hazisia
- Hoangus
- Horniolus
- Hovaulis
- Iberorhyzobius
- Incurvus
- Iracilda
- Leptoscymnus
- Lucialla
- Microrhizobius
- Midus
- Nat
- Neorhizobius
- Neoryssomus
- Nephaspis
- Nephus
- Nothocolus
- Nurettinus
- Orbipressus
- Oridia
- Oroides
- Orynipus
- Oryssomus
- Paracranoryssus
- Parastethorus
- Ponaria
- Poorani
- Poria
- Propiptus
- Pseudoazya
- Pseudoepipleuria
- Pseudoryssomus
- Psorolyma
- Pullosidis
- Reniscymnus
- Rhizoryssomus
- Rhyzobius
- Robert
- Rodatus
- Roger
- Sasajiscymnus
- Scymniscus
- Scymnobius
- Scymnodes
- Scymnus
- Sidonis
- Siola
- Slipinskiscymnus
- Stenadalia
- Stethorus
- Sumnius
- Syntona
- Tetrabrachys
- Veronicobius
- Viridigloba
- Wioletta
- Zagloba
- Zilus
