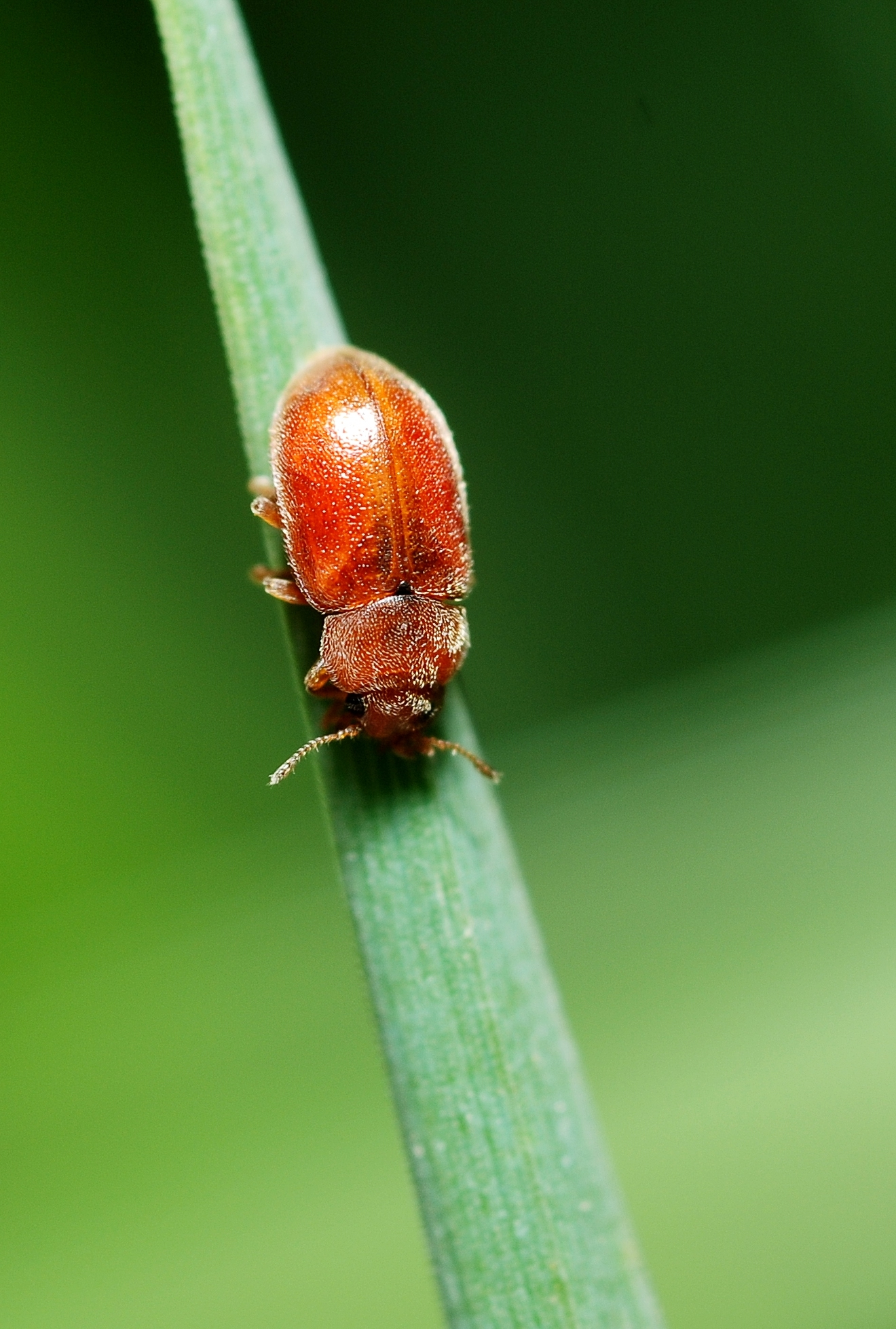
- Adult Coccidula rufa

Scientific classification
- Kingdom: Animalia
- Phylum: Arthropoda
- Class: Insecta
- Order: Coleoptera
- Suborder: Polyphaga
- Infraorder: Cucujiformia
- Family: Coccinellidae
- Subfamily: Coccidulinae; Mulsant, 1846

Tribes
- Azyini; Coccidulini; Cranophorini; Exoplectrini; Lithophilini; Monocorynini; Noviini; Oryssomini; Poriini

= Coccidulinae =

Subfamily of beetles

The Coccidulinae are a subfamily of lady beetles in the family Coccinellidae. Recent molecular analyses suggest that Coccidulinae is not a monophyletic group (e.g., the tribe Noviini may belong instead with Epilachninae).
