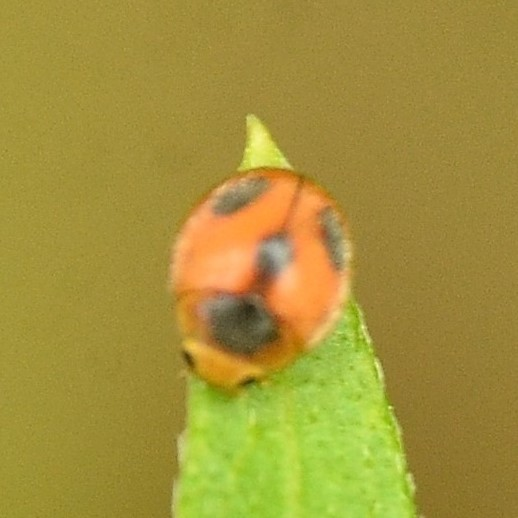

Scientific classification
- Kingdom: Animalia
- Phylum: Arthropoda
- Clade: Pancrustacea
- Class: Insecta
- Order: Coleoptera
- Suborder: Polyphaga
- Infraorder: Cucujiformia
- Family: Coccinellidae
- Genus: Pseudaspidimerus
- Species: P. trinotatus

Binomial name
- Pseudaspidimerus trinotatus (Thunberg, 1781)

Synonyms
- Coccinella trinotata Thunberg, 1781; Pseudaspidimerus trinouuus Pope, 1987; Platynaspis circtunflexa Motschulsky, 1858; Aspidimerus circumflexa Korschefsky, 1931; Aspidimerus circumflexa var. testaceus Weise, 1901; Pseudaspidimerus circumflexa Kapur, 1948

= Pseudaspidimerus trinotatus =

Species of beetle

Pseudaspidimerus trinotatus is a species of lady beetle found in India, Sri Lanka and Myanmar.

== Description ==
The mean body length is about 2.97 mm. Some specimens rarely have pronotal and elytral spots and mostly lack the pronotal and sub scutellar spots. The form testaceus is without any markings. It has bright golden yellow to reddish brown body and sometime dark brown in color.

Eggs are spindle shaped and pale yellow. The incubation period is about 4 days. There are four instar larval stages. The total larval period is about 10 days. The pre-pupal and pupal period is about 1.5 and 7.8 days, respectively. Total life cycle is about 50 days by male and 55 days by female.

== Biology ==
It is a predator of several whiteflies, aphids and scale insects such as Aphis craccivora, Aleurodicus dispersus, Aleurodicus dispersus, Aphis fabae, Aphis nerii, Aphis malvoides, Pseudococcus, Aphis spiraecola, Hysteroneura setariae, Melanaphis sacchari, Lipaphis erysimi, Pentalonia nigronervosa, Rastrococcus iceryoides, Ferrisia virgata, Toxoptera odinae and Chloropuluinaria psidii.
