= Scymnus saciformis =

Scientific classification
- Kingdom: Animalia
- Phylum: Arthropoda
- Clade: Pancrustacea
- Class: Insecta
- Order: Coleoptera
- Suborder: Polyphaga
- Infraorder: Cucujiformia
- Family: Coccinellidae
- Genus: Scymnus
- Species: S. saciformis

Binomial name
- Scymnus saciformis (Motschoulsky, 1858)

Species of beetle

Scymnus (Pullus) saciformis, is a species of lady beetle found in India, and Sri Lanka.

== Biology ==
It is a predator of several aphids, mealybugs and whiteflies such as Aleurodicus dispersus and Aleurodicus rugioperculatus.
