= Cryptogonus postmedialis =

Scientific classification
- Kingdom: Animalia
- Phylum: Arthropoda
- Clade: Pancrustacea
- Class: Insecta
- Order: Coleoptera
- Suborder: Polyphaga
- Infraorder: Cucujiformia
- Family: Coccinellidae
- Genus: Cryptogonus
- Species: C. postmedialis

Binomial name
- Cryptogonus postmedialis Kapur, 1948

Species of beetle

Cryptogonus postmedialis is a species of beetle of the family Coccinellidae. It is found in India (Andaman Islands, Assam, Manipur, Sikkim, Uttarakhand, West Bengal), Bhutan, Nepal, Myanmar and China.

== Description ==
Adults reach a length of about 2–2.5 mm (0.079–0.098 in). The head is black in females and yellow in males. The pronotum is black with yellowish anterolateral corners and the scutellum is black. The elytra are black, each with a yellowish-orange spot in the apical third.

== Life history ==
They have been recorded preying on Aspidiotus destructor.
