= Aleurodicus cocois =

Scientific classification
- Kingdom: Animalia
- Phylum: Arthropoda
- Class: Insecta
- Order: Hemiptera
- Suborder: Sternorrhyncha
- Family: Aleyrodidae
- Genus: Aleurodicus
- Species: A. cocois

Binomial name
- Aleurodicus cocois (John Curtis, 1846)

Synonyms
- Aleurodicus anonae Morgan, 1892; Aleyrodes cocois Curtis, 1846

Species of beetle

Aleurodicus cocois, commonly known as the coconut whitefly, is a species of whitefly in the family Aleyrodidae; it feeds on coconut and other palm trees in South America and the Caribbean region.

== Taxonomy ==
This species was first described in 1846 by the English entomologist John Curtis. He named it Aleyrodes cocois, but it was later transferred to the new genus Aleurodicus by the English entomologist John William Douglas. He had erected the genus to accommodate Aleurodicus anonae, so when it was determined that A. anonae was a junior synonym of A. cocois, the latter became the type species of the genus. In other parts of the world, there are certain other species of whitefly that attack coconut palms, which are known locally as "coconut whitefly"; these include Aleurodicus destructor and Aleurodicus dispersus in tropical southern Asia and Australasia, and Aleurodicus pulvinatus and A. dispersus in the Neotropics.

== Description and life cycle ==
The eggs are laid on the undersides of leaves in small batches in a spiral pattern 2 cm (1 in) or more across, close to wax patches secreted by the female. The first instar larvae are "crawlers" but stay in the vicinity of the spiral. The second, third and fourth instars are immobile and feed by sucking sap from the leaf; they secrete wax and develop a marginal fringe of white waxy strands. After pupation, the adult insects have yellowish-orange bodies and translucent wings. They also secrete powdery wax, giving them a mealy appearance and turning the wings white. They mate and disperse to other locations.

== Distribution and habitat ==
Aleurodicus cocois is found in the West Indies, Mexico, Venezuela, French Guiana, Guyana, Suriname, Brazil and Peru. It is a serious pest of coconut palm and cashew, and also infests ornamental palms, oil palm, rubber tree, Ficus, plantain, avocado and black pepper.

== Ecology ==
It has been found that some clones of dwarf cashew are more susceptible to attack by A. cocois than are others; the most resistant clones have a greater number of glandular trichomes on their leaves, and contain a higher proportion of phenols in their leaves. Predators of A. cocois include the lady beetles Clitostethus dispar, Nephaspis oculata, and Cryptognatha nodiceps.

After a hurricane struck Barbados in 1831, the planting of imported coconut palms accidentally introduced A. cocois but not its natural enemies, and the whitefly attacked virtually every tree on the island and devastated production.
