= Pseudaspidimerus flaviceps =

Scientific classification
- Kingdom: Animalia
- Phylum: Arthropoda
- Clade: Pancrustacea
- Class: Insecta
- Order: Coleoptera
- Suborder: Polyphaga
- Infraorder: Cucujiformia
- Family: Coccinellidae
- Genus: Pseudaspidimerus
- Species: P. flaviceps

Binomial name
- Pseudaspidimerus flaviceps (Walker, 1859)

Synonyms
- Coccinella flaviceps Walker, 1859; Scymnus flaviceps Gemminger & Harold, 1876; Pseudaspidimerus flaviceps Kapur, 1948; Pseudaspidimerus flaviceps var. limbatus Kapur, 1948; Aspidimerus horni Weise, 1901

Species of beetle

Pseudaspidimerus flaviceps is a species of lady beetle native to India (Goa, Karnataka, Kerala, Tamil Nadu) and Sri Lanka.

== Description ==
Adults reach a length of about 2.25–2.4 mm (0.089–0.094 in). The head is pale yellow, while the rest of the dorsal surface is pale golden yellow, orange yellow or yellowish brown, with dense pubescence.

== Biology ==
It is a predator of several whiteflies, aphids and scale insects such as Aphis gossypii, Aphis spiraecola, Aleurodicus dispersus and Quadraspidiotus perniciosus.
