= Trigonocarinatus bryanti =

Scientific classification
- Kingdom: Animalia
- Phylum: Arthropoda
- Clade: Pancrustacea
- Class: Insecta
- Order: Coleoptera
- Suborder: Polyphaga
- Infraorder: Cucujiformia
- Family: Coccinellidae
- Genus: Trigonocarinatus
- Species: T. bryanti

Binomial name
- Trigonocarinatus bryanti (Kapur, 1948)

Synonyms
- Cryptogonus bryanti Kapur, 1948; Cryptogonus kapuri Ghorpadé, 1974

Species of beetle

Trigonocarinatus bryanti is a species of beetle of the family Coccinellidae. It is found in India (Karnataka, Kerala, Tamil Nadu) and Sri Lanka.

== Description ==
Adults reach a length of about 2 mm (0.079 in). The head is yellowish testaceous or creamy yellow. The pronotum has a median black macula with the anterior margin and anterolateral corners yellowish. The scutellum is black and the elytra are black to dark brown, with a highly variable pattern.

== Life history ==
They have been recorded preying on Aphididae species, as well as Aspidiotus destructor.
