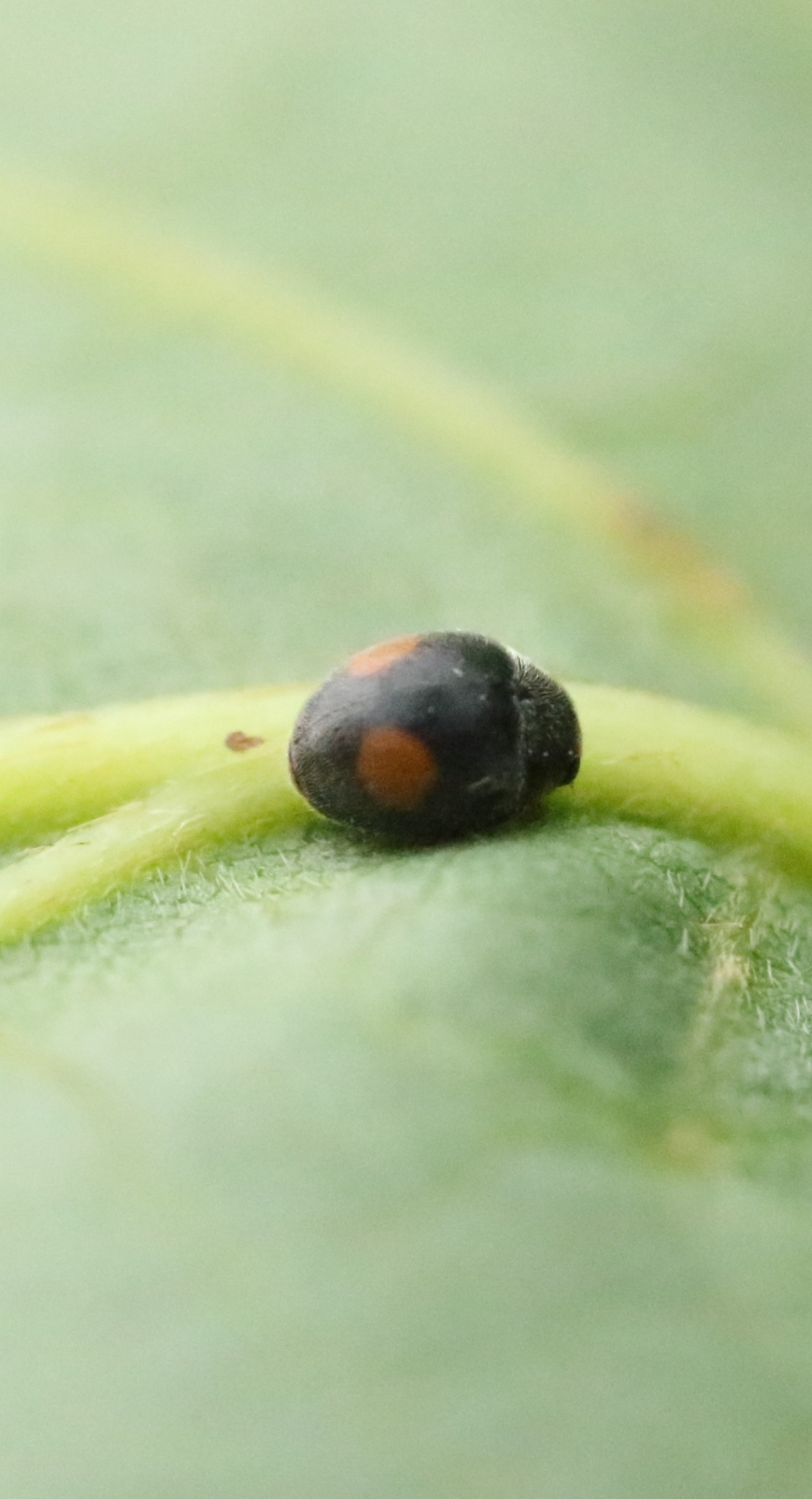

Scientific classification
- Kingdom: Animalia
- Phylum: Arthropoda
- Clade: Pancrustacea
- Class: Insecta
- Order: Coleoptera
- Suborder: Polyphaga
- Infraorder: Cucujiformia
- Family: Coccinellidae
- Genus: Cryptogonus
- Species: C. orbiculus

Binomial name
- Cryptogonus orbiculus (Gyllenhal, 1808)

Synonyms
- Coccinella orbicula Gyllenhal in Schönherr, 1808; Coccinella lunigera Thunberg in Schönherr, 1808 (preocc.); Aspidimerus fulvocinctus Mulsant, 1853; Aspidimerus stellaris Mulsant, 1856; Platynaspis oculata Motschulsky, 1858; Cryptogonus centroguttatus Boheman, 1859; Coccinella antica Walker, 1859; Cryptogonus malasiae Crotch, 1874; Scymnus mitsuhashii Takizawa, 1917; Diomus futahoshii Ohta, 1929; Scymnus klapperichi Mader, 1955

= Cryptogonus orbiculus =

Species of beetle

Cryptogonus orbiculus is a species of lady beetle found in India, Sri Lanka, Nepal, China, Taiwan, Japan, Thailand, Guam, and Northern Mariana Islands.

== Description ==
Elytra black with an oval orange spot on each elytron.

== Biology ==
It is a predator of several whiteflies, aphids and scale insects such as Aspidiotus destructor, Paracoccus marginatus and Aphis gossypii.
