= Cryptogonus bimaculatus =

Scientific classification
- Kingdom: Animalia
- Phylum: Arthropoda
- Clade: Pancrustacea
- Class: Insecta
- Order: Coleoptera
- Suborder: Polyphaga
- Infraorder: Cucujiformia
- Family: Coccinellidae
- Genus: Cryptogonus
- Species: C. bimaculatus

Binomial name
- Cryptogonus bimaculatus Kapur, 1948

Species of beetle

Cryptogonus bimaculatus is a species of beetle of the family Coccinellidae. It is found in India (Assam, Arunachal Pradesh, Manipur, Meghalaya, Mizoram, Nagaland, Sikkim, Tripura), Bhutan, China, Myanmar, Nepal and Thailand.

== Description ==
Adults reach a length of about 2.15–2.8 mm (0.085–0.110 in). The head is yellow in males and blackish in females. The pronotum is yellowish with a black macula and the scutellum is dark pitchy brown to black. The elytra are ochreous yellow to yellowish brown, each with a black median spot.

== Life history ==
They have been recorded preying on Aphis citricidus and Hyalopterus pruni.
