= Cryptogonus hainanensis =

Scientific classification
- Kingdom: Animalia
- Phylum: Arthropoda
- Clade: Pancrustacea
- Class: Insecta
- Order: Coleoptera
- Suborder: Polyphaga
- Infraorder: Cucujiformia
- Family: Coccinellidae
- Genus: Cryptogonus
- Species: C. hainanensis

Binomial name
- Cryptogonus hainanensis Pang & Mao, 1979

Species of beetle

Cryptogonus hainanensis is a species of beetle of the family Coccinellidae. It is found in India (Bihar, Tripura, West Bengal), Pakistan and China.

== Description ==
Adults reach a length of about 2–2.3 mm (0.079–0.091 in). They are yellowish to reddish testaceous, the pronotum with a black macula on the disc and a lighter testaceous anterior margin The elytra are black with the anterolateral and humeral angles and apical one-fourth yellowish-testaceous.

== Life history ==
They have been recorded preying on Melanaphis sacchari.
