= Rugose =

Rugose means "wrinkled". It may refer to:

- Rugosa, an extinct order of coral, whose rugose shape earned it the name
- Rugose, adjectival form of rugae

== Species with "rugose" in their names ==
- Idiosoma nigrum, more commonly, a black rugose trapdoor spider
- Rugose spiraling whitefly
