= Cryptognatha celia =

Scientific classification
- Kingdom: Animalia
- Phylum: Arthropoda
- Clade: Pancrustacea
- Class: Insecta
- Order: Coleoptera
- Suborder: Polyphaga
- Infraorder: Cucujiformia
- Family: Coccinellidae
- Genus: Cryptognatha
- Species: C. celia

Binomial name
- Cryptognatha celia González & Hanley, 2019

Species of beetle

Cryptognatha celia is a species of beetle of the family Coccinellidae. It is found in Brazil.

== Description ==
Adults reach a length of about 2.3 mm. Adults are black with a yellow head. The anterior margin of the pronotum is yellowish brown, while the lateral one-fourth is yellow.

== Biology ==
They prey on Aspidiotus destructor.
