= Cryptognatha nodiceps =

Scientific classification
- Kingdom: Animalia
- Phylum: Arthropoda
- Clade: Pancrustacea
- Class: Insecta
- Order: Coleoptera
- Suborder: Polyphaga
- Infraorder: Cucujiformia
- Family: Coccinellidae
- Genus: Cryptognatha
- Species: C. nodiceps

Binomial name
- Cryptognatha nodiceps Marshall, 1912

Species of beetle

Cryptognatha nodiceps, known generally as the coconut scale predator or sugarcane scale predator, is a species of lady beetle in the family Coccinellidae; it is found in the Caribbean region, North America, and Oceania, having been introduced to various countries in an attempt to provide biological pest control of the coconut scale (Aspidiotus destructor).

== Description ==
The larvae of Cryptognatha nodiceps are dark yellow and elongated, with long waxy outgrowths, and grow to a length of about 7 mm (0.28 in). The pupae are a similar colour. The adults are shiny, rounded, dome-shaped beetles, about 2 mm (0.08 in) in length. The head and pronotum are brown and the elytra are blackish.

== Distribution ==
Cryptognatha nodiceps is native to Trinidad and Tobago and is present in other parts of the Caribbean region and in Florida. It is also present in Colombia, Guyana, Angola, São Tomé and Príncipe, Pakistan and the Philippines. It has been introduced into a number of island groups including Fiji, French Polynesia, Guam, Vanuatu and Hawaii.

== Ecology ==
The adult female Cryptognatha nodiceps lives for about five weeks, producing an average of about 140 eggs, with the time between consecutive generations being about six weeks. Eggs are laid singly underneath an empty scale test. Both larvae and adults feed on various scale insects in the families Diaspididae and Coccidae, including the coconut scale (Aspidiotus destructor), with adults eating about twenty coconut scales in a day. They also consume the coconut whitefly (Aleurodicus cocois), but are unable to reproduce on this alone; they do not feed on aphids, psyllids or mealybugs. This lady beetle is used in the biological pest control of coconut scale, which has spread from southern Asia to various parts of the tropics and subtropics where coconuts are grown.
