= Cryptognatha fenestrata =

Scientific classification
- Kingdom: Animalia
- Phylum: Arthropoda
- Clade: Pancrustacea
- Class: Insecta
- Order: Coleoptera
- Suborder: Polyphaga
- Infraorder: Cucujiformia
- Family: Coccinellidae
- Genus: Cryptognatha
- Species: C. fenestrata

Binomial name
- Cryptognatha fenestrata Champion, 1913

Species of beetle

Cryptognatha fenestrata is a species of beetle of the family Coccinellidae. It is found in Panama.

== Description ==
Adults reach a length of about 1.66 mm (0.065 in). They have a hemispherical, very convex, shining and glabrous. They are black, the elytra each with a large rufous patch on the middle of the disc, and the coxae and legs are testaceous. The thorax is closely and minutely, and the elytra more sparsely and much more distinctly punctulate.
