= Cryptognatha circumdata =

Scientific classification
- Kingdom: Animalia
- Phylum: Arthropoda
- Clade: Pancrustacea
- Class: Insecta
- Order: Coleoptera
- Suborder: Polyphaga
- Infraorder: Cucujiformia
- Family: Coccinellidae
- Genus: Cryptognatha
- Species: C. circumdata

Binomial name
- Cryptognatha circumdata Gorham, 1894

Species of beetle

Cryptognatha circumdata is a species of beetle of the family Coccinellidae. It is found in Guatemala.

== Description ==
Adults reach a length of about 3 mm (0.12 in). They are black and very shining. The head, pronotum (except the middle), margins of the elytra, legs and underside are blood-red. They have a hemispherical, very shining, almost glabrous body. The sparse and fine punctuation is easily visible only on the sides..
