= Hyalopterus =

Scientific classification
- Domain: Eukaryota
- Kingdom: Animalia
- Phylum: Arthropoda
- Class: Insecta
- Order: Hemiptera
- Suborder: Sternorrhyncha
- Family: Aphididae
- Genus: Hyalopterus; Koch, 1854

Genus of true bugs

Hyalopterus is a genus of true bugs belonging to the family Aphididae.

The species of this genus are found in Eurasia and Northern America.

Species:

- Hyalopterus amygdali (Blanchard, 1840)
- Hyalopterus arundiniformis Ghulamullah, 1942
- Hyalopterus pruni (Geoffroy, 1762)
