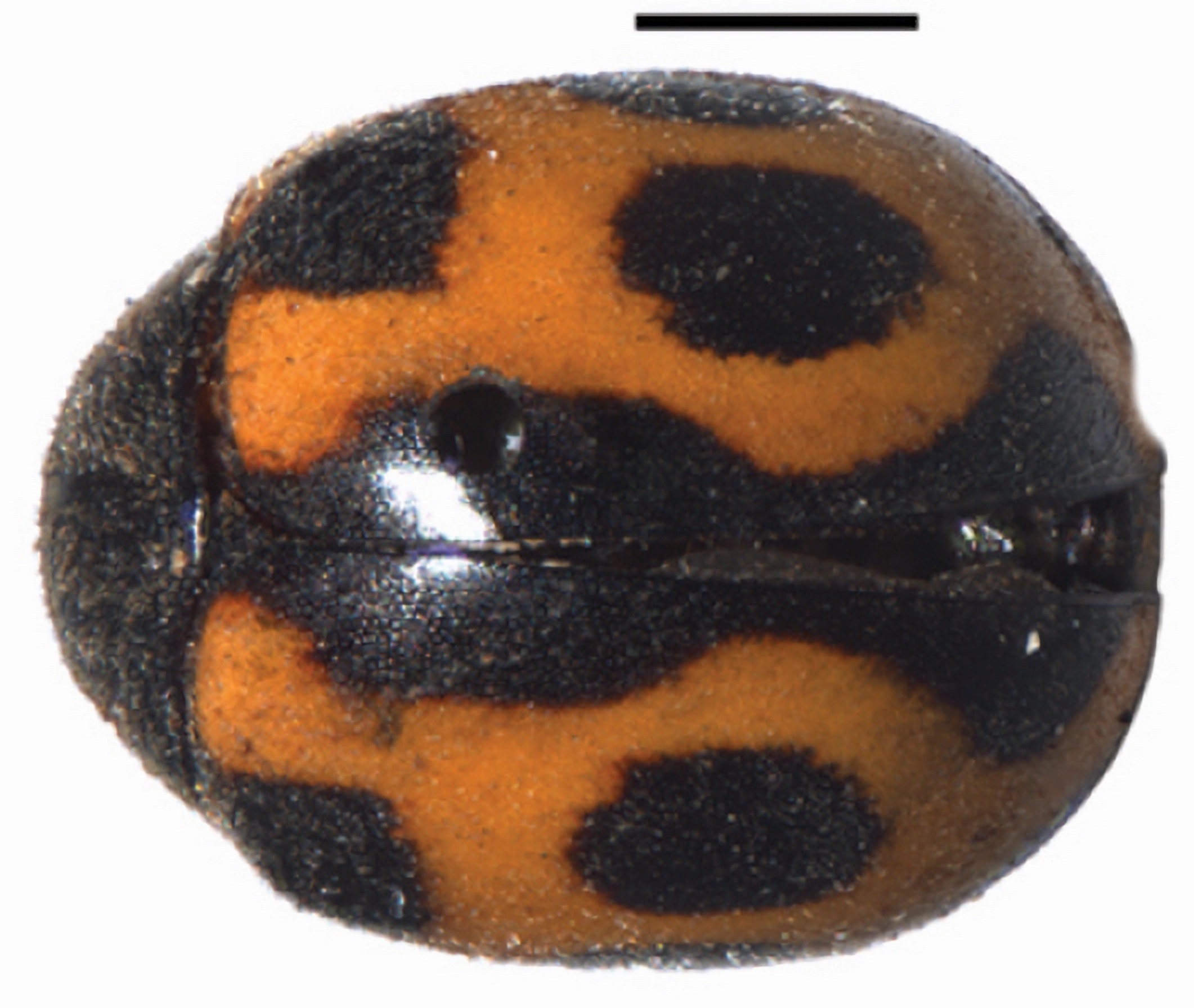

Scientific classification
- Kingdom: Animalia
- Phylum: Arthropoda
- Clade: Pancrustacea
- Class: Insecta
- Order: Coleoptera
- Suborder: Polyphaga
- Infraorder: Cucujiformia
- Family: Coccinellidae
- Genus: Aspidimerus
- Species: A. decemmaculatus

Binomial name
- Aspidimerus decemmaculatus Pang & Mao, 1979

= Aspidimerus decemmaculatus =

Species of beetle

Aspidimerus decemmaculatus is a species of beetle of the family Coccinellidae. It is found in China (Yunnan).

== Description ==
Adults reach a length of about 4.1 mm (0.16 in). They have a large, oblong oval body, with the dorsum moderately convex and pubescent. The head is yellowish brown with black eyes. The pronotum is black, with the anterior corners yellowish brown. The scutellum is black and the elytra are yellowish brown with black margins. Each elytron with four black spots besides a black sutural stripe which expanded at near basal and apical part. The underside is black, except for the reddish brown legs and abdomen.
