= Cryptognatha yolandi =

Scientific classification
- Kingdom: Animalia
- Phylum: Arthropoda
- Clade: Pancrustacea
- Class: Insecta
- Order: Coleoptera
- Suborder: Polyphaga
- Infraorder: Cucujiformia
- Family: Coccinellidae
- Genus: Cryptognatha
- Species: C. yolandi

Binomial name
- Cryptognatha yolandi Crotch, 1874

Species of beetle

Cryptognatha yolandi is a species of beetle of the family Coccinellidae. It is found in Brazil.

== Description ==
Adults reach a length of about 2.3 mm. Adults are black with a yellow head. The lateral one-third of the pronotum is yellow.
