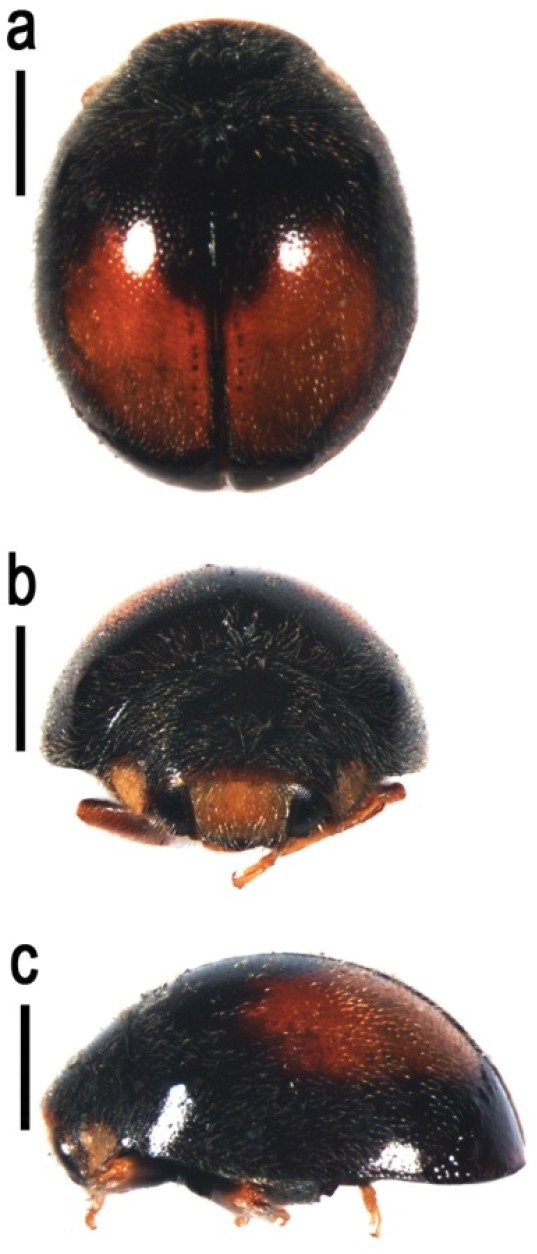

Scientific classification
- Kingdom: Animalia
- Phylum: Arthropoda
- Clade: Pancrustacea
- Class: Insecta
- Order: Coleoptera
- Suborder: Polyphaga
- Infraorder: Cucujiformia
- Family: Coccinellidae
- Genus: Cryptogonus
- Species: C. reniformis

Binomial name
- Cryptogonus reniformis Huo & Ren, 2015

= Cryptogonus reniformis =

Species of beetle

Cryptogonus reniformis is a species of beetle of the family Coccinellidae. It is found in China (Yunnan, Tibet).

== Description ==
Adults reach a length of about 1.9–2.4 mm (0.075–0.094 in). They have a rounded body, which is densely covered with short, silver white pubescence. The head is yellowish in males and black in females, with a dark brown clypeus. The pronotum is black, except for a triangular yellowish spot at the anterior corner in males. The scutellum is black and the elytra are black with a reniform spot at the middle. The underside is black except for the legs, which are partially yellowish.

== Etymology ==
The species name is a Latin adjective referring to its reniform spot on elytra.
