= Cryptogonus nitidus =

Scientific classification
- Kingdom: Animalia
- Phylum: Arthropoda
- Clade: Pancrustacea
- Class: Insecta
- Order: Coleoptera
- Suborder: Polyphaga
- Infraorder: Cucujiformia
- Family: Coccinellidae
- Genus: Cryptogonus
- Species: C. nitidus

Binomial name
- Cryptogonus nitidus Kapur, 1948

Species of beetle

Cryptogonus nitidus is a species of beetle of the family Coccinellidae. It is found in India (Manipur, Tripura), Nepal and Myanmar.

== Description ==
Adults reach a length of about 3.2 mm (0.13 in). The dorsal surface is dark brown to black and somewhat shiny. The elytra have four yellow spots. The ventral surface is dark with lighter reddish brown legs.
