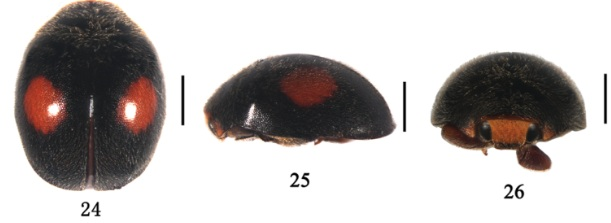

Scientific classification
- Kingdom: Animalia
- Phylum: Arthropoda
- Clade: Pancrustacea
- Class: Insecta
- Order: Coleoptera
- Suborder: Polyphaga
- Infraorder: Cucujiformia
- Family: Coccinellidae
- Genus: Aspidimerus
- Species: A. matsumurai

Binomial name
- Aspidimerus matsumurai Sasaji, 1968

= Aspidimerus matsumurai =

Species of beetle

Aspidimerus matsumurai is a species of beetle of the family Coccinellidae. It is found in China (Yunnan, Hainan), Taiwan and Vietnam.

== Description ==
Adults reach a length of about 3.75–4.6 mm (0.148–0.181 in). They have an oblong oval, moderately convex and pubescent body. The head is yellow with the clypeus dark brown and the eyes black. The pronotum is black except for the yellowish brown antero-lateral corners and anterior margin. The scutellum is black and the elytra are black with two round red (sometimes yellowish brown) spots. The underside is black, except for the reddish brown legs and abdomen.
