= Cryptognatha shelia =

Scientific classification
- Kingdom: Animalia
- Phylum: Arthropoda
- Clade: Pancrustacea
- Class: Insecta
- Order: Coleoptera
- Suborder: Polyphaga
- Infraorder: Cucujiformia
- Family: Coccinellidae
- Genus: Cryptognatha
- Species: C. shelia

Binomial name
- Cryptognatha shelia González & Hanley, 2019

Species of beetle

Cryptognatha shelia is a species of beetle of the family Coccinellidae. It is found in Brazil.

== Description ==
Adults reach a length of about 2.6–2.7 mm. Adults are dark brown with a yellow head. The anterior border and lateral one-fourth of the pronotum are yellow.
