= Cryptognatha karla =

Scientific classification
- Kingdom: Animalia
- Phylum: Arthropoda
- Clade: Pancrustacea
- Class: Insecta
- Order: Coleoptera
- Suborder: Polyphaga
- Infraorder: Cucujiformia
- Family: Coccinellidae
- Genus: Cryptognatha
- Species: C. karla

Binomial name
- Cryptognatha karla González & Hanley, 2019

Species of beetle

Cryptognatha karla is a species of beetle of the family Coccinellidae. It is found in Brazil and Paraguay.

== Description ==
Adults reach a length of about 1.9–3.1 mm. Adults are yellow with a darker yellow head. The pronotum is yellow and the elytron has a large dark brown spot.
