= Cryptogonus horishanus =

Scientific classification
- Kingdom: Animalia
- Phylum: Arthropoda
- Clade: Pancrustacea
- Class: Insecta
- Order: Coleoptera
- Suborder: Polyphaga
- Infraorder: Cucujiformia
- Family: Coccinellidae
- Genus: Cryptogonus
- Species: C. horishanus

Binomial name
- Cryptogonus horishanus (Ohta, 1929)

Synonyms
- Scymnus horishanus Ohta, 1929; Pseudaspidimerus japonensis Nakane & Araki, 1958

Species of beetle

Cryptogonus horishanus is a species of beetle of the family Coccinellidae. It is found in Japan (Yakushima, Ryukyu Islands) and Taiwan.

== Description ==
Adults reach a length of about 1.7–2.4 mm (0.067–0.094 in). The pronotum is black with the anterior margin and lateral areas yellow or yellowish brown. The scutellum is black and the elytra are black, each with a yellow or yellowish orange discal spot.
