= Cryptognatha vicki =

Scientific classification
- Kingdom: Animalia
- Phylum: Arthropoda
- Clade: Pancrustacea
- Class: Insecta
- Order: Coleoptera
- Suborder: Polyphaga
- Infraorder: Cucujiformia
- Family: Coccinellidae
- Genus: Cryptognatha
- Species: C. vicki

Binomial name
- Cryptognatha vicki González & Hanley, 2019

Species of beetle

Cryptognatha vicki is a species of beetle of the family Coccinellidae. It is found in Bolivia.

== Description ==
Adults reach a length of about 2.6 mm. Adults are yellow. The pronotum has seven dark spots and the elytron has four dark spots.
