= Cryptognatha aethiops =

Scientific classification
- Kingdom: Animalia
- Phylum: Arthropoda
- Clade: Pancrustacea
- Class: Insecta
- Order: Coleoptera
- Suborder: Polyphaga
- Infraorder: Cucujiformia
- Family: Coccinellidae
- Genus: Cryptognatha
- Species: C. aethiops

Binomial name
- Cryptognatha aethiops Crotch, 1874

Species of beetle

Cryptognatha aethiops is a species of beetle of the family Coccinellidae. It is found in Colombia.

== Description ==
Adults reach a length of about 3.4 mm. Adults are black and the antero-lateral angle of the pronotum is yellow.
