= Trigonocarinatus bilineatus =

Scientific classification
- Kingdom: Animalia
- Phylum: Arthropoda
- Clade: Pancrustacea
- Class: Insecta
- Order: Coleoptera
- Suborder: Polyphaga
- Infraorder: Cucujiformia
- Family: Coccinellidae
- Genus: Trigonocarinatus
- Species: T. bilineatus

Binomial name
- Trigonocarinatus bilineatus (Kapur, 1948)

Synonyms
- Cryptogonus bilineatus Kapur, 1948

Species of beetle

Trigonocarinatus bilineatus is a species of beetle of the family Coccinellidae. It is found in India (Tamil Nadu).

== Description ==
Adults reach a length of about 2.5 mm (0.098 in). The head is testaceous and the pronotum is black with the anterior margin bordered black and the lateral margins with a testaceous spot. The scutellum and elytra are black, each elytron with a testaceous stripe.
