= Aspidimerini =

Scientific classification
- Kingdom: Animalia
- Phylum: Arthropoda
- Clade: Pancrustacea
- Class: Insecta
- Order: Coleoptera
- Suborder: Polyphaga
- Infraorder: Cucujiformia
- Family: Coccinellidae
- Subfamily: Coccinellinae
- Tribe: Aspidimerini; Weise, 1900

Tribe of beetles

Aspidimerini is a tribe of beetles in the family Coccinellidae. The included species are distributed widely across South and Southeast Asia and are predators of aphids, whiteflies, and scale insects.

== Description ==
Beetles in this tribe are characterized by three morphological features. The first is legs with very broad and flattened trochanters and femora, forming subrectangular or oval clubs that protect their tibiae and tarsi. The second is very short antennae with eight or nine segments. These antennae are hidden in antennal grooves and only partially visible in a ventral view. The third is an abdomen with six ventrites, with the first ventrite being distinctly longer than the second.

== Taxonomy ==
Aspidimerini contains the following genera:

- Acarinus
- Aspidimerus
- Cryptogonus
- Pseudaspidimerus
- Trigonocarinatus
- Tumidusternus
