= Cryptognatha clarkii =

Scientific classification
- Kingdom: Animalia
- Phylum: Arthropoda
- Clade: Pancrustacea
- Class: Insecta
- Order: Coleoptera
- Suborder: Polyphaga
- Infraorder: Cucujiformia
- Family: Coccinellidae
- Genus: Cryptognatha
- Species: C. clarkii

Binomial name
- Cryptognatha clarkii Crotch, 1874

Species of beetle

Cryptognatha clarkii is a species of beetle of the family Coccinellidae. It is found in Brazil.

== Description ==
Adults reach a length of about 2-2.4 mm. Adults are dark blackish brown with a yellow head. The pronotum is black, while the lateral one-eights is yellow. The lateral one-fourth of the elytron is black and there is a blackish brown central spot.
