= Cryptogonus trioblitus =

Scientific classification
- Kingdom: Animalia
- Phylum: Arthropoda
- Clade: Pancrustacea
- Class: Insecta
- Order: Coleoptera
- Suborder: Polyphaga
- Infraorder: Cucujiformia
- Family: Coccinellidae
- Genus: Cryptogonus
- Species: C. trioblitus

Binomial name
- Cryptogonus trioblitus (Gorham, 1895)

Synonyms
- Aspidimerus trioblitus Gorham, 1895

Species of beetle

Cryptogonus trioblitus is a species of beetle of the family Coccinellidae. It is found in India (Assam, Uttarakhand, Tripura), Nepal, Myanmar, China and Thailand.

== Description ==
Adults reach a length of about 2.5 mm (0.098 in). The head is black in females and yellow in males. The pronotum is black with the anterolateral angles and anterior margin yellowish. The elytral pattern is variable, but normally consists of two small lateral spots and one larger sutural spot.
