= Cryptognatha pudibunda =

Scientific classification
- Kingdom: Animalia
- Phylum: Arthropoda
- Clade: Pancrustacea
- Class: Insecta
- Order: Coleoptera
- Suborder: Polyphaga
- Infraorder: Cucujiformia
- Family: Coccinellidae
- Genus: Cryptognatha
- Species: C. pudibunda

Binomial name
- Cryptognatha pudibunda Mulsant, 1850

Synonyms
- Cryptognatha fryii Crotch, 1874; Cryptognatha bryanti Brèthes, 1925

Species of beetle

Cryptognatha pudibunda is a species of beetle of the family Coccinellidae. It is found in Brazil, Paraguay, Peru and Venezuela.

== Description ==
Adults reach a length of about 2.2–2.5 mm. Adults are black with a yellow head. The lateral one-fourth of the pronotum is yellow.
