= Cryptognatha batesii =

Scientific classification
- Kingdom: Animalia
- Phylum: Arthropoda
- Clade: Pancrustacea
- Class: Insecta
- Order: Coleoptera
- Suborder: Polyphaga
- Infraorder: Cucujiformia
- Family: Coccinellidae
- Genus: Cryptognatha
- Species: C. batesii

Binomial name
- Cryptognatha batesii Crotch, 1874

Species of beetle

Cryptognatha batesii is a species of beetle of the family Coccinellidae. It is found in Brazil.

== Description ==
Adults reach a length of about 3.8 mm. Adults are black with a pale yellow head. The pronotum is pale yellow with a faint brown spot.
