= Cryptognatha reedii =

Scientific classification
- Kingdom: Animalia
- Phylum: Arthropoda
- Clade: Pancrustacea
- Class: Insecta
- Order: Coleoptera
- Suborder: Polyphaga
- Infraorder: Cucujiformia
- Family: Coccinellidae
- Genus: Cryptognatha
- Species: C. reedii

Binomial name
- Cryptognatha reedii Crotch, 1874

Species of beetle

Cryptognatha reedii is a species of beetle of the family Coccinellidae. It is found in Brazil.

== Description ==
Adults reach a length of about 1.8–2 mm. Adults are dark brown with a yellow head. The pronotum is yellow and the elytron is black with the apical half, the base and the humeral reddish yellow.
