= Cryptognatha hannah =

Scientific classification
- Kingdom: Animalia
- Phylum: Arthropoda
- Clade: Pancrustacea
- Class: Insecta
- Order: Coleoptera
- Suborder: Polyphaga
- Infraorder: Cucujiformia
- Family: Coccinellidae
- Genus: Cryptognatha
- Species: C. hannah

Binomial name
- Cryptognatha hannah González & Hanley, 2019

Species of beetle

Cryptognatha hannah is a species of beetle of the family Coccinellidae. It is found in Peru.

== Description ==
Adults reach a length of about 3.1 mm. Adults are black with a yellow head. The lateral one-third of the pronotum is yellow and there is a black spot. The elytron has a yellow border.
