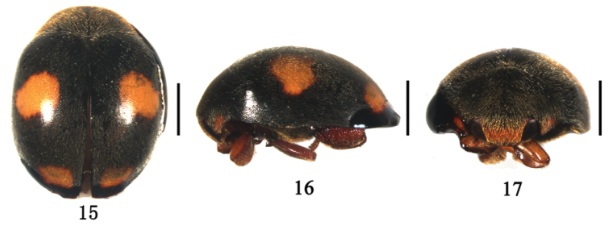

Scientific classification
- Kingdom: Animalia
- Phylum: Arthropoda
- Clade: Pancrustacea
- Class: Insecta
- Order: Coleoptera
- Suborder: Polyphaga
- Infraorder: Cucujiformia
- Family: Coccinellidae
- Genus: Aspidimerus
- Species: A. esakii

Binomial name
- Aspidimerus esakii Sasaji, 1968

= Aspidimerus esakii =

Species of beetle

Aspidimerus esakii is a species of beetle of the family Coccinellidae. It is found in China (Hainan, Guangxi) and Taiwan.

== Description ==
Adults reach a length of about 3.7 mm (0.15 in). They have an oblong oval body, with the dorsum moderately convex and densely pubescent. The head is yellowish brown, with the clypeus reddish brown and the eyes black. The pronotum is black, except for the yellowish brown anterior corners. The scutellum and elytra are black, each elytron with two yellowish brown spots. The underside is black, except for the legs and abdomen, which are reddish brown.
