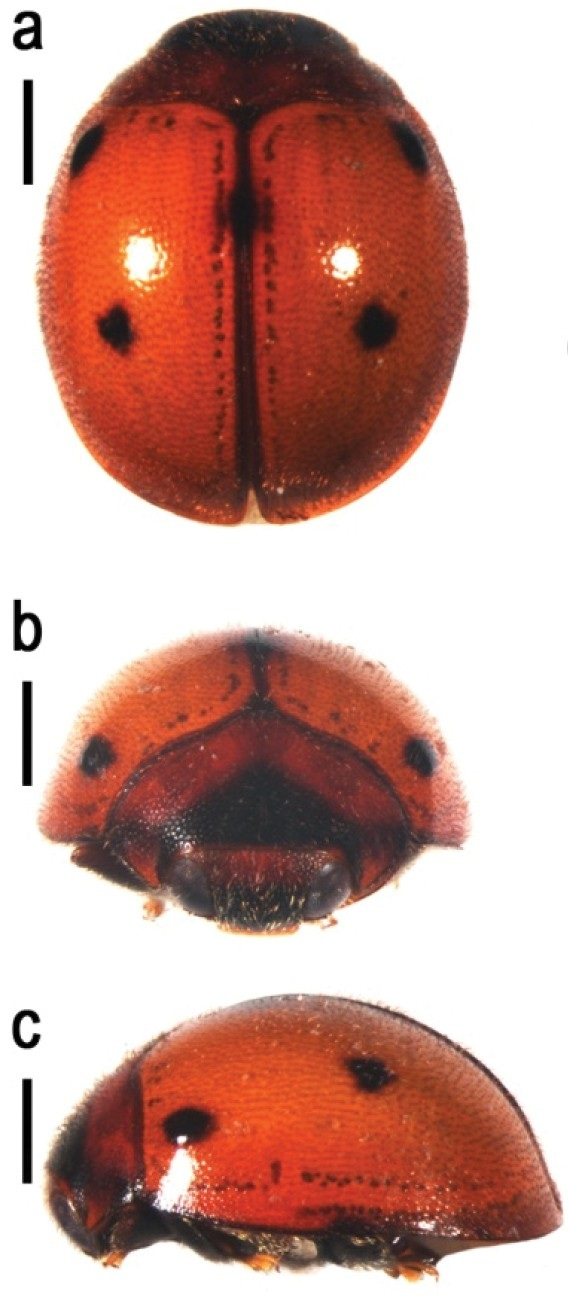

Scientific classification
- Kingdom: Animalia
- Phylum: Arthropoda
- Clade: Pancrustacea
- Class: Insecta
- Order: Coleoptera
- Suborder: Polyphaga
- Infraorder: Cucujiformia
- Family: Coccinellidae
- Genus: Cryptogonus
- Species: C. hingstoni

Binomial name
- Cryptogonus hingstoni Kapur, 1948

= Cryptogonus hingstoni =

Species of beetle

Cryptogonus hingstoni is a species of beetle of the family Coccinellidae. It is found in India (Sikkim) and China (Tibet).

== Description ==
Adults reach a length of about 2.8 mm (0.11 in). They are yellowish-orange to reddish brown, the pronotum with a black median macula. The scutellum is dark reddish brown and the elytra have five small black spots forming a W-shape.
