= Cryptognatha castanea =

Scientific classification
- Kingdom: Animalia
- Phylum: Arthropoda
- Clade: Pancrustacea
- Class: Insecta
- Order: Coleoptera
- Suborder: Polyphaga
- Infraorder: Cucujiformia
- Family: Coccinellidae
- Genus: Cryptognatha
- Species: C. castanea

Binomial name
- Cryptognatha castanea Gorham, 1899

Species of beetle

Cryptognatha castanea is a species of beetle of the family Coccinellidae. It is found in Brazil (São Paulo).

== Description ==
Adults reach a length of about 1.75 mm (0.069 in). Adults may be distinguished by the strongly deflexed basal margins of the elytra and (accordingly) rounded base of the thorax (reminding one of a small Chilocorus species) and by the orbiculate elytra with slightly expanded margins.
