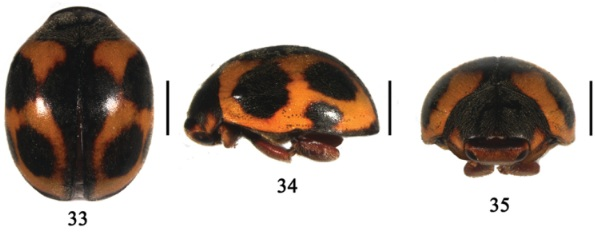

Scientific classification
- Kingdom: Animalia
- Phylum: Arthropoda
- Clade: Pancrustacea
- Class: Insecta
- Order: Coleoptera
- Suborder: Polyphaga
- Infraorder: Cucujiformia
- Family: Coccinellidae
- Genus: Aspidimerus
- Species: A. zhenkangicus

Binomial name
- Aspidimerus zhenkangicus Huo & Ren, 2013

= Aspidimerus zhenkangicus =

Species of beetle

Aspidimerus zhenkangicus is a species of beetle of the family Coccinellidae. It is found in China (Yunnan).

== Description ==
Adults reach a length of about 4.5–4.75 mm (0.177–0.187 in). They have a medium sized, oval body, with the dorsum moderately convex and pubescent. The head is dark yellow with the basal margin and clypeus reddish brown and black eyes. The pronotum is black, except for the dark yellow anterior corners. The scutellum is black and the elytra are yellowish brown with a black sutural stripe, which is distinctly expanded near the basal half. The elytral margins are black and each elytron has three black spots. The underside is reddish brown, except for the dark yellow legs.

== Etymology ==
The species name refers to the type locality, Zhenkang, Yunnan.
