= Cryptognatha weisei =

Scientific classification
- Kingdom: Animalia
- Phylum: Arthropoda
- Clade: Pancrustacea
- Class: Insecta
- Order: Coleoptera
- Suborder: Polyphaga
- Infraorder: Cucujiformia
- Family: Coccinellidae
- Genus: Cryptognatha
- Species: C. weisei

Binomial name
- Cryptognatha weisei Brèthes, 1925

Species of beetle

Cryptognatha weisei is a species of beetle of the family Coccinellidae. It is found in Brazil.

== Description ==
Adults reach a length of about 1.6–2.2 mm. Adults are black with a yellow head. The lateral one-eight of the pronotum is yellow and the apex of the elytron is also yellow.
