= Cryptogonus complexus =

Scientific classification
- Kingdom: Animalia
- Phylum: Arthropoda
- Clade: Pancrustacea
- Class: Insecta
- Order: Coleoptera
- Suborder: Polyphaga
- Infraorder: Cucujiformia
- Family: Coccinellidae
- Genus: Cryptogonus
- Species: C. complexus

Binomial name
- Cryptogonus complexus Kapur, 1948

Species of beetle

Cryptogonus complexus is a species of beetle of the family Coccinellidae. It is found in India (Assam, Manipur, Meghalaya, Sikkim, Tripura), Bhutan, Nepal, Myanmar and China.

== Description ==
Adults reach a length of about 2–2.25 mm (0.079–0.089 in). The head is yellow in males and black in females. The pronotum is black with a yellowish or reddish brown anterior margin and yellow anterolateral angles. The elytral pattern is highly variable, but often black with a yellow apical spot.
