= Cryptognatha subaequalis =

Scientific classification
- Kingdom: Animalia
- Phylum: Arthropoda
- Clade: Pancrustacea
- Class: Insecta
- Order: Coleoptera
- Suborder: Polyphaga
- Infraorder: Cucujiformia
- Family: Coccinellidae
- Genus: Cryptognatha
- Species: C. subaequalis

Binomial name
- Cryptognatha subaequalis Champion, 1913

Species of beetle

Cryptognatha subaequalis is a species of beetle of the family Coccinellidae. It is found in Guatemala.

== Description ==
Adults reach a length of about 1.8 mm (0.071 in). They have a hemispherical, very convex, shining and glabrous body. They are black, with the legs testaceous. The head, thorax and elytra are closely punctulate, with the punctures on the elytra nearly as approximate as those on the thorax. Beneath, they are closely, very finely punctate.
