= Trigonocarinatus =

Scientific classification
- Kingdom: Animalia
- Phylum: Arthropoda
- Clade: Pancrustacea
- Class: Insecta
- Order: Coleoptera
- Suborder: Polyphaga
- Infraorder: Cucujiformia
- Family: Coccinellidae
- Subfamily: Coccinellinae
- Tribe: Aspidimerini
- Genus: Trigonocarinatus; Huo & Ren, 2015

Genus of beetles

Trigonocarinatus is a genus of beetles belonging to the family Coccinellidae.

== Species ==
- Trigonocarinatus bilineatus
- Trigonocarinatus bryanti
- Trigonocarinatus cuneatus
- Trigonocarinatus gongshanus
- Trigonocarinatus menghaiensis
- Trigonocarinatus montanus
- Trigonocarinatus ramus
