= Cryptognatha amicta =

Scientific classification
- Kingdom: Animalia
- Phylum: Arthropoda
- Clade: Pancrustacea
- Class: Insecta
- Order: Coleoptera
- Suborder: Polyphaga
- Infraorder: Cucujiformia
- Family: Coccinellidae
- Genus: Cryptognatha
- Species: C. amicta

Binomial name
- Cryptognatha amicta Gorham, 1899

Species of beetle

Cryptognatha amicta is a species of beetle of the family Coccinellidae. It is found in Panama and Colombia.

== Description ==
Adults reach a length of about 2.7–3 mm. Adults are yellow. The pronotum has black basal spots and a yellow area. The elytron has a spot on the lateral margin and a apical yellowish red margin.
