= Cryptogonus himalayensis =

Scientific classification
- Kingdom: Animalia
- Phylum: Arthropoda
- Clade: Pancrustacea
- Class: Insecta
- Order: Coleoptera
- Suborder: Polyphaga
- Infraorder: Cucujiformia
- Family: Coccinellidae
- Genus: Cryptogonus
- Species: C. himalayensis

Binomial name
- Cryptogonus himalayensis Kapur, 1948

Species of beetle

Cryptogonus himalayensis is a species of beetle of the family Coccinellidae. It is found in India (Sikkim), Bhutan and China.

== Description ==
Adults reach a length of about 2.25–2.5 mm (0.089–0.098 in). The head and pronotum are yellow, the latter anteriorly yellowish-orange with a black macula on the posterior margin. The elytra are black with the apical third yellow, sometimes with a small black sutural spot.
