= Cryptognatha auriculata =

Scientific classification
- Kingdom: Animalia
- Phylum: Arthropoda
- Clade: Pancrustacea
- Class: Insecta
- Order: Coleoptera
- Suborder: Polyphaga
- Infraorder: Cucujiformia
- Family: Coccinellidae
- Genus: Cryptognatha
- Species: C. auriculata

Binomial name
- Cryptognatha auriculata Mulsant, 1850

Species of beetle

Cryptognatha auriculata is a species of beetle of the family Coccinellidae. It is found in Colombia, Guyana, Suriname, Peru and Venezuela.

== Description ==
Adults reach a length of about 2.1–3 mm. Adults are pale brownish yellow with a pale yellow head. The anterior one-third and lateral one-fourth of the pronotum are pale yellow and there is a black basal spot.
