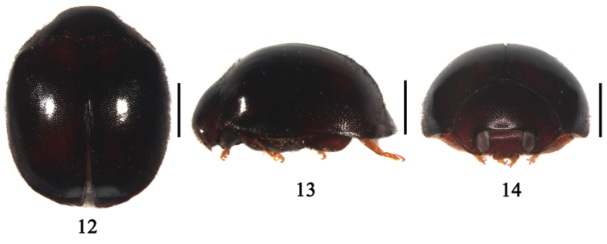

Scientific classification
- Kingdom: Animalia
- Phylum: Arthropoda
- Clade: Pancrustacea
- Class: Insecta
- Order: Coleoptera
- Suborder: Polyphaga
- Infraorder: Cucujiformia
- Family: Coccinellidae
- Genus: Aspidimerus
- Species: A. nigritus

Binomial name
- Aspidimerus nigritus (Pang & Mao, 1979)

Synonyms
- Cryptogonus nigritus Pang & Mao, 1979; Aspidimerus dongpaoensis Hoang, 1982

= Aspidimerus nigritus =

Species of beetle

Aspidimerus nigritus is a species of beetle of the family Coccinellidae. It is found in China (Yunnan) and Vietnam.

== Description ==
Adults reach a length of about 3.75 mm (0.148 in). They have an oblong-oval, strongly convex, and sparsely pubescent body. The head is reddish-brown, and the eyes silver-white. The dorsal surface is entirely black and the underside is reddish brown, except for the prosternum, mesoventrite and metaventrite, which are dark brown.
