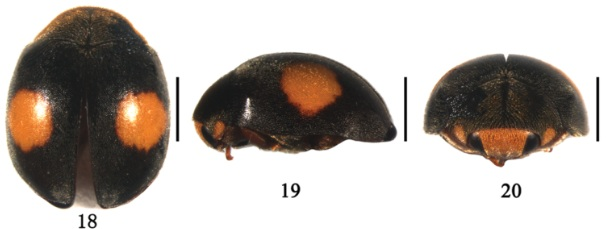

Scientific classification
- Kingdom: Animalia
- Phylum: Arthropoda
- Clade: Pancrustacea
- Class: Insecta
- Order: Coleoptera
- Suborder: Polyphaga
- Infraorder: Cucujiformia
- Family: Coccinellidae
- Genus: Aspidimerus
- Species: A. menglensis

Binomial name
- Aspidimerus menglensis Huo & Ren, 2013

= Aspidimerus menglensis =

Species of beetle

Aspidimerus menglensis is a species of beetle of the family Coccinellidae. It is found in China (Yunnan).

== Description ==
Adults reach a length of about 3.5–3.9 mm (0.14–0.15 in). They have an oval body, with the dorsum moderately convex and pubescent. The head is yellow with the base brown in males and black in females. The clypeus is reddish brown and the eyes are black. The pronotum is black except for the yellow anterior corner. The scutellum is black and the elytra are black with two round yellow spots. The underside is black, except for the brown mesoventrite and legs.

== Etymology ==
The species name refers to the type locality, Mengla, Yunnan.
