= Cryptognatha gayle =

Scientific classification
- Kingdom: Animalia
- Phylum: Arthropoda
- Clade: Pancrustacea
- Class: Insecta
- Order: Coleoptera
- Suborder: Polyphaga
- Infraorder: Cucujiformia
- Family: Coccinellidae
- Genus: Cryptognatha
- Species: C. gayle

Binomial name
- Cryptognatha gayle González & Hanley, 2019

Species of beetle

Cryptognatha gayle is a species of beetle of the family Coccinellidae. It is found in Suriname.

== Description ==
Adults reach a length of about 2.9 mm. Adults are dark brown with a yellow head. The lateral one-fifth of the pronotum is yellow and the lateral one-third of the elytron is reddish brown. There is also an elongate spot.
