= Aspidimerus =

Scientific classification
- Kingdom: Animalia
- Phylum: Arthropoda
- Clade: Pancrustacea
- Class: Insecta
- Order: Coleoptera
- Suborder: Polyphaga
- Infraorder: Cucujiformia
- Family: Coccinellidae
- Subfamily: Coccinellinae
- Tribe: Aspidimerini
- Genus: Aspidimerus; Mulsant, 1850

Genus of beetles

Aspidimerus is a genus of beetles belonging to the family Coccinellidae.

== Species ==
- Aspidimerus birmanicus
- Aspidimerus chapaensis
- Aspidimerus decemmaculatus
- Aspidimerus dissimilis
- Aspidimerus esakii
- Aspidimerus guangxiensis
- Aspidimerus kabakovi
- Aspidimerus laokayensis
- Aspidimerus matsumurai
- Aspidimerus menglensis
- Aspidimerus mouhoti
- Aspidimerus nigritus
- Aspidimerus nigrovittatus
- Aspidimerus rectangulatus
- Aspidimerus ruficrus
- Aspidimerus serratus
- Aspidimerus spencii
- Aspidimerus zhenkangicus
