= Pseudaspidimerus lambai =

Scientific classification
- Kingdom: Animalia
- Phylum: Arthropoda
- Clade: Pancrustacea
- Class: Insecta
- Order: Coleoptera
- Suborder: Polyphaga
- Infraorder: Cucujiformia
- Family: Coccinellidae
- Genus: Pseudaspidimerus
- Species: P. lambai

Binomial name
- Pseudaspidimerus lambai Kapur, 1967

Species of beetle

Pseudaspidimerus lambai is a species of beetle of the family Coccinellidae. It is found in India (Andaman Islands).

== Description ==
Adults reach a length of about 2.25 mm (0.089 in). The head is yellow in males and mostly black in females. The pronotum is black with the anterolateral corners and sides yellow and the posterolateral corners black. The elytra are black, with the apical margin lighter testaceous.

== Life history ==
They have been recorded preying on scale insects infecting coconut.
