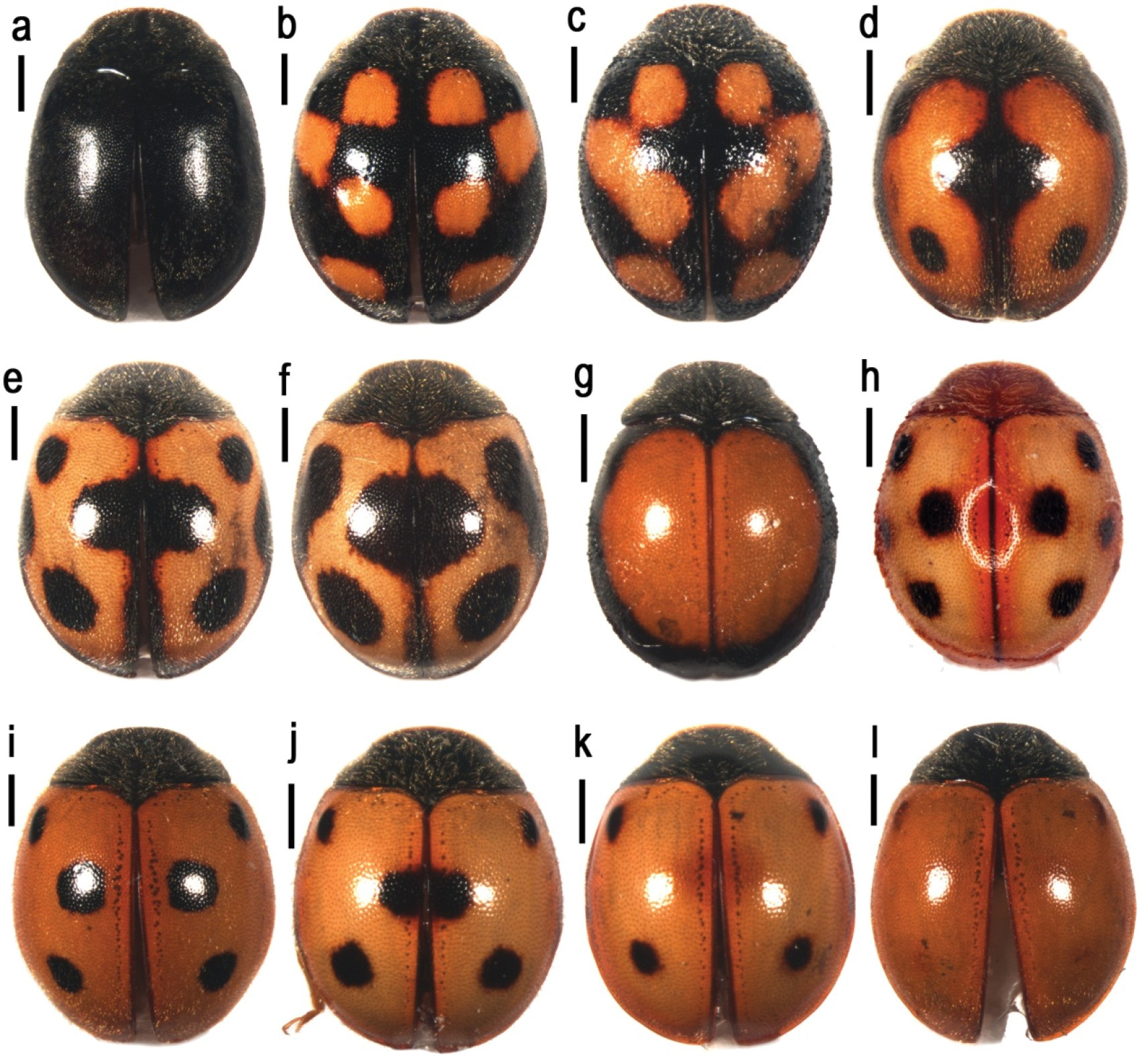
- Various elytral colorations of Cryptogonus schraiki

Scientific classification
- Kingdom: Animalia
- Phylum: Arthropoda
- Clade: Pancrustacea
- Class: Insecta
- Order: Coleoptera
- Suborder: Polyphaga
- Infraorder: Cucujiformia
- Family: Coccinellidae
- Genus: Cryptogonus
- Species: C. schraiki

Binomial name
- Cryptogonus schraiki Mader, 1933

Synonyms
- Cryptogonus octoguttatus Mader, 1954; Cryptogonus kurasawai Sasaji, 1968

= Cryptogonus schraiki =

Species of beetle

Cryptogonus schraiki is a species of beetle of the family Coccinellidae. It is found in China (Anhui, Fujian, Gansu, Guangdong, Guizhou, Hubei, Hunan, Sichuan, Yunnan) and Taiwan.

== Description ==
Adults reach a length of about 2.6–2.9 mm (0.10–0.11 in). The elytral coloration is variable, ranging from entirely black to entirely yellowish.
