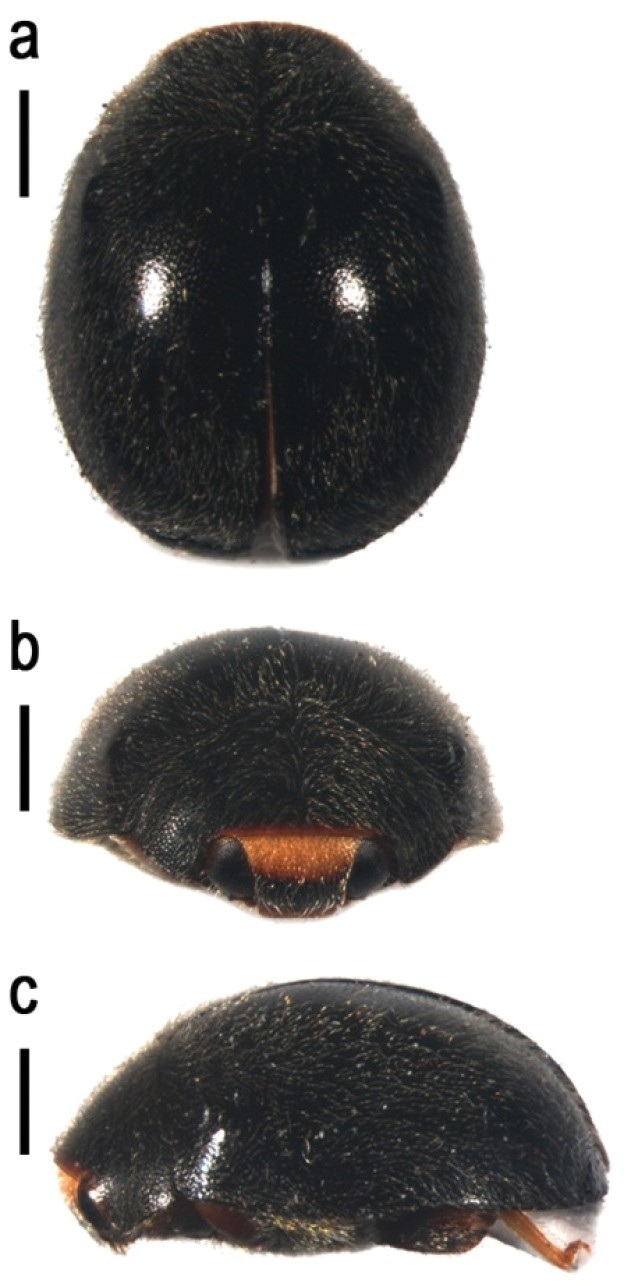

Scientific classification
- Kingdom: Animalia
- Phylum: Arthropoda
- Clade: Pancrustacea
- Class: Insecta
- Order: Coleoptera
- Suborder: Polyphaga
- Infraorder: Cucujiformia
- Family: Coccinellidae
- Genus: Cryptogonus
- Species: C. fusiformis

Binomial name
- Cryptogonus fusiformis Huo & Ren, 2015

= Cryptogonus fusiformis =

Species of beetle

Cryptogonus fusiformis is a species of beetle of the family Coccinellidae. It is found in China (Yunnan).

== Description ==
Adults reach a length of about 2.68 mm (0.106 in). They have a rounded body, which is densely covered with short, silver white pubescence. The base of the head is yellow, while the anterior part is black and the clypeus dark brown. The dorsum is entirely black and the ventral side is black except for the legs and abdomen, which are partially reddish brown.

== Etymology ==
The species name is a Latin adjective referring to its fusiform penis guide in ventral view.
