= Pseudaspidimerus mauliki =

Scientific classification
- Kingdom: Animalia
- Phylum: Arthropoda
- Clade: Pancrustacea
- Class: Insecta
- Order: Coleoptera
- Suborder: Polyphaga
- Infraorder: Cucujiformia
- Family: Coccinellidae
- Genus: Pseudaspidimerus
- Species: P. mauliki

Binomial name
- Pseudaspidimerus mauliki Kapur, 1948

Synonyms
- Pseudaspidimerus maulihi var. siamensis Kapur, 1948; Pseudaspidimerus rectangulatus (Kuznetsov & Pang, 1991); Pseudaspidimerus serratus (Kuznetsov & Pang, 1991

Species of beetle

Pseudaspidimerus mauliki is a species of lady beetle native to India, Sri Lanka, Bangladesh, Thailand, and Java.

== Description ==
Adults reach a length of about 2.15–2.6 mm (0.085–0.102 in). Body color with two forms; one form with reddish testaceous body with a pronotal black marking and three-spotted elytra. Second form with plain testaceous brown body without any markings. Prosternal carinae is subrectangular. and the carinae are sub-parallel.

== Life history ==
They have been recorded preying on aphids.
