= Cryptognatha pam =

Scientific classification
- Kingdom: Animalia
- Phylum: Arthropoda
- Clade: Pancrustacea
- Class: Insecta
- Order: Coleoptera
- Suborder: Polyphaga
- Infraorder: Cucujiformia
- Family: Coccinellidae
- Genus: Cryptognatha
- Species: C. pam

Binomial name
- Cryptognatha pam González & Hanley, 2019

Species of beetle

Cryptognatha pam is a species of beetle of the family Coccinellidae. It is found in Venezuela.

== Description ==
Adults reach a length of about 2.6 mm. Adults are yellow. The pronotum has five faint brown spots and the elytron has one dark brown vitta.
