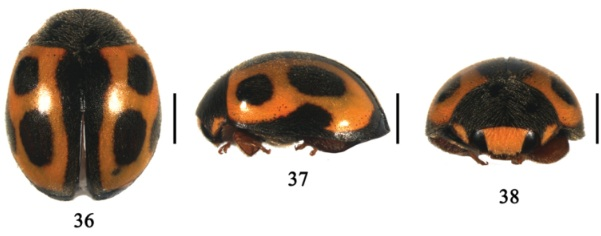

Scientific classification
- Kingdom: Animalia
- Phylum: Arthropoda
- Clade: Pancrustacea
- Class: Insecta
- Order: Coleoptera
- Suborder: Polyphaga
- Infraorder: Cucujiformia
- Family: Coccinellidae
- Genus: Aspidimerus
- Species: A. ruficrus

Binomial name
- Aspidimerus ruficrus Gorham, 1895

Synonyms
- Cryptogonus blandus Mader, 1954; Aspidimerus sexmaculatus Pang & Mao, 1979

= Aspidimerus ruficrus =

Species of beetle

Aspidimerus ruficrus is a species of beetle of the family Coccinellidae. It is found in China (Sichuan, Yunnan), Vietnam and Myanmar.

== Description ==
Adults reach a length of about 3.75–4 mm (0.148–0.157 in). They have an oblong oval body, with the dorsum moderately convex and pubescent. The head is deep yellow in males and black in females. The eyes are black or silver. The pronotum is black with the anterior corners deep yellow. The scutellum is black and the elytra are deep yellow with a black border along all the margins and three black spots. The underside is black, except for the reddish brown legs and abdomen.
