= Cryptogonus angusticarinatus =

Scientific classification
- Kingdom: Animalia
- Phylum: Arthropoda
- Clade: Pancrustacea
- Class: Insecta
- Order: Coleoptera
- Suborder: Polyphaga
- Infraorder: Cucujiformia
- Family: Coccinellidae
- Genus: Cryptogonus
- Species: C. angusticarinatus

Binomial name
- Cryptogonus angusticarinatus Sasaji, 1968

Species of beetle

Cryptogonus angusticarinatus is a species of beetle of the family Coccinellidae. It is found in Taiwan.

== Description ==
Adults reach a length of about 2.2–2.4 mm (0.087–0.094 in). The head is yellowish brown with a reddish brown clypeus in males and totally black with a reddish brown clypeus in females. The pronotum is black with a yellowish marking at the anterior corners and a yellowish brown anterior margin. The scutellum is black and the elytra are black, sometimes with a reddish brown apical margin.
