= Cryptognatha della =

Scientific classification
- Kingdom: Animalia
- Phylum: Arthropoda
- Clade: Pancrustacea
- Class: Insecta
- Order: Coleoptera
- Suborder: Polyphaga
- Infraorder: Cucujiformia
- Family: Coccinellidae
- Genus: Cryptognatha
- Species: C. della

Binomial name
- Cryptognatha della González & Hanley, 2019

Species of beetle

Cryptognatha della is a species of beetle of the family Coccinellidae. It is found in Peru.

== Description ==
Adults reach a length of about 2.3–2.4 mm. Adults are reddish brown with a yellow head. The pronotum is reddish brown and the elytron has a large black spot.
