= Cryptogonus loebli =

Scientific classification
- Kingdom: Animalia
- Phylum: Arthropoda
- Clade: Pancrustacea
- Class: Insecta
- Order: Coleoptera
- Suborder: Polyphaga
- Infraorder: Cucujiformia
- Family: Coccinellidae
- Genus: Cryptogonus
- Species: C. loebli

Binomial name
- Cryptogonus loebli Canepari, 1986

Species of beetle

Cryptogonus loebli is a species of beetle of the family Coccinellidae. It is found in India (Uttarakhand).

== Description ==
Adults reach a length of about 2.45–2.75 mm (0.096–0.108 in). The head is black and the pronotum is black with red anterior corners. The elytra are black with two red bands.
