= Cryptognatha whitney =

Scientific classification
- Kingdom: Animalia
- Phylum: Arthropoda
- Clade: Pancrustacea
- Class: Insecta
- Order: Coleoptera
- Suborder: Polyphaga
- Infraorder: Cucujiformia
- Family: Coccinellidae
- Genus: Cryptognatha
- Species: C. whitney

Binomial name
- Cryptognatha whitney González & Hanley, 2019

Species of beetle

Cryptognatha whitney is a species of beetle of the family Coccinellidae. It is found in Colombia.

== Description ==
Adults reach a length of about 2.7–3.1 mm. Adults are black with a yellow head. The pronotum is yellow with a black area.
