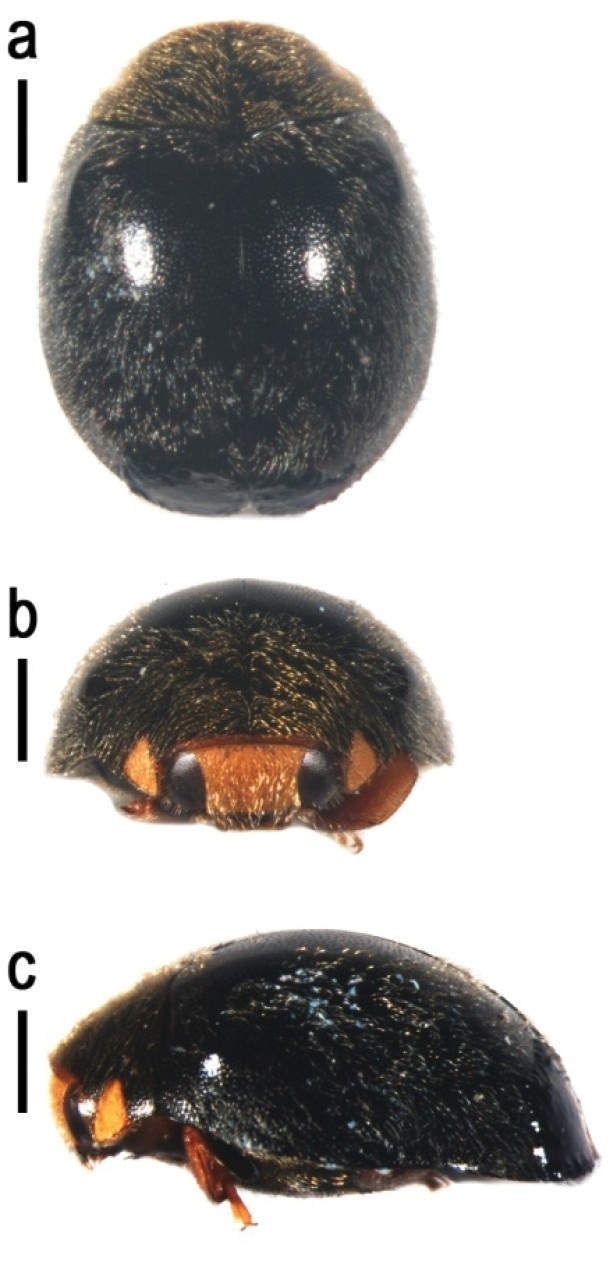

Scientific classification
- Kingdom: Animalia
- Phylum: Arthropoda
- Clade: Pancrustacea
- Class: Insecta
- Order: Coleoptera
- Suborder: Polyphaga
- Infraorder: Cucujiformia
- Family: Coccinellidae
- Genus: Cryptogonus
- Species: C. dulongjiangensis

Binomial name
- Cryptogonus dulongjiangensis Huo & Ren, 2015

= Cryptogonus dulongjiangensis =

Species of beetle

Cryptogonus dulongjiangensis is a species of beetle of the family Coccinellidae. It is found in China (Yunnan).

== Description ==
Adults reach a length of about 2.37–2.6 mm (0.093–0.102 in). They have a rounded body, densely covered with short pubescence, which is golden on the head and pronotum and silver white on the elytra. The head is yellow in males and black in females, with the clypeus dark brown. The pronotum is black except for a triangular yellow spot at the anterior corner in males. The scutellum and elytra are black. The ventral side is black except for the legs and abdomen, which are partially yellow to dark brown.

== Etymology ==
The species name refers to the type locality, Dulongjiang, Yunnan.
