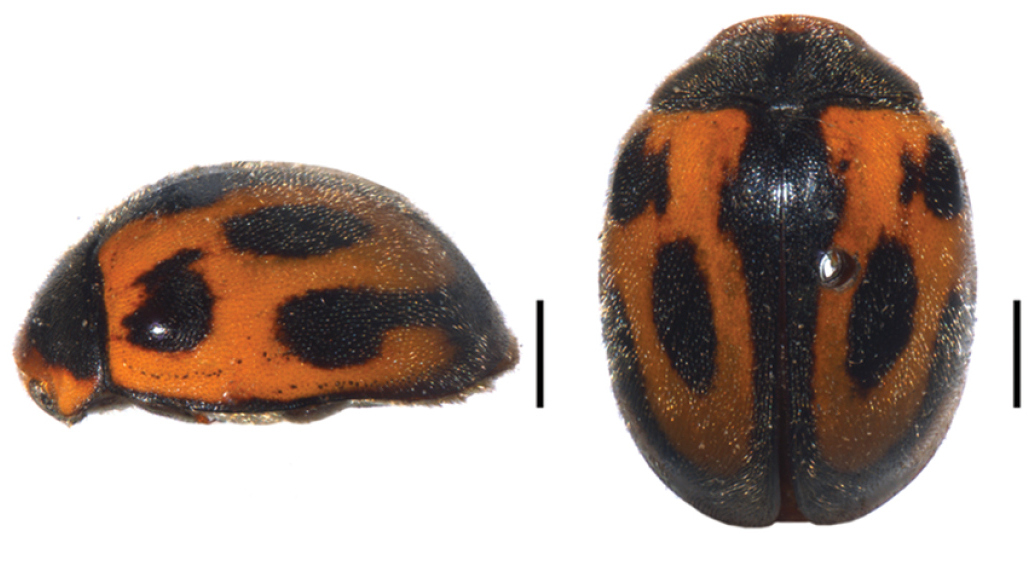

Scientific classification
- Kingdom: Animalia
- Phylum: Arthropoda
- Clade: Pancrustacea
- Class: Insecta
- Order: Coleoptera
- Suborder: Polyphaga
- Infraorder: Cucujiformia
- Family: Coccinellidae
- Genus: Aspidimerus
- Species: A. mouhoti

Binomial name
- Aspidimerus mouhoti Crotch, 1874

= Aspidimerus mouhoti =

Species of beetle

Aspidimerus mouhoti is a species of beetle of the family Coccinellidae. It is found in China (Yunnan) and Laos.

== Description ==
Adults reach a length of about 4.8 mm (0.19 in). They have a relatively large, oval body, with the dorsum convex and pubescent. The head is yellowish brown in males and reddish brown in females. The eyes are black, while the clypeus, mouthparts and antennae are reddish brown. The pronotum is black with the anterior corner yellowish brown. The scutellum is black and the elytra are yellowish brown with three black spots on each elytron and with the lateral margins black. The underside is reddish brown, except for the prosternum, mesoventrite and metaventrite, which are all black.
