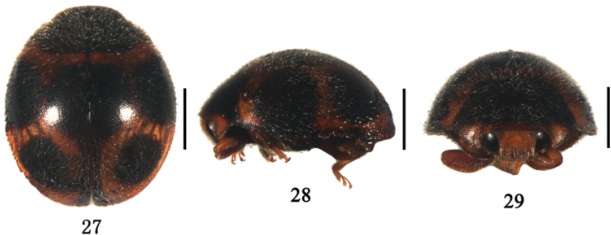

Scientific classification
- Kingdom: Animalia
- Phylum: Arthropoda
- Clade: Pancrustacea
- Class: Insecta
- Order: Coleoptera
- Suborder: Polyphaga
- Infraorder: Cucujiformia
- Family: Coccinellidae
- Genus: Aspidimerus
- Species: A. kabakovi

Binomial name
- Aspidimerus kabakovi Hoang, 1982

= Aspidimerus kabakovi =

Species of beetle

Aspidimerus kabakovi is a species of beetle of the family Coccinellidae. It is found in China (Guangdong, Guangxi, Yunnan) and Vietnam.

== Description ==
Adults reach a length of about 2.85–3.5 mm (0.112–0.138 in). They have a subrounded body, with the dorsum moderately convex and pubescent. The head is yellowish brown with the clypeus reddish brown and the eyes black or silver white. The pronotum is black except for the brown anterior margin and anterior corners. The scutellum is black and the elytra are brown with five subrounded black spots. The underside is reddish brown, except for the prosternum, mesoventrite and metaventrite, which are all dark brown.
