= Cryptogonus =

Scientific classification
- Kingdom: Animalia
- Phylum: Arthropoda
- Clade: Pancrustacea
- Class: Insecta
- Order: Coleoptera
- Suborder: Polyphaga
- Infraorder: Cucujiformia
- Family: Coccinellidae
- Subfamily: Coccinellinae
- Tribe: Aspidimerini
- Genus: Cryptogonus; Mulsant, 1850

Type species
- Cryptogonus orbiculus Gyllenhal, 1808

Genus of beetles

Cryptogonus is a genus of beetles in the family Coccinellidae.

== Description ==
In Cryptogonus beetles, the epistome does not cover the labrum. The head is short and embedded deeply in the prothorax.

== Taxonomy ==
Cryptogonus contains the following species:

- Cryptogonus angusticarinatus
- Cryptogonus ariasi
- Cryptogonus bhalwalnensis
- Cryptogonus bimaculatus
- Cryptogonus brachylobius
- Cryptogonus complexus
- Cryptogonus deltodirus
- Cryptogonus deltoides
- Cryptogonus downingi
- Cryptogonus dulongjiangensis
- Cryptogonus forficulae
- Cryptogonus fractemaculatus
- Cryptogonus fulvoterminatus
- Cryptogonus fusiformis
- Cryptogonus guangdongiensis
- Cryptogonus hainanensis
- Cryptogonus hanoiensis
- Cryptogonus himalayensis
- Cryptogonus hingstoni
- Cryptogonus horishanus
- Cryptogonus laetus
- Cryptogonus langchanhensis
- Cryptogonus lepidus
- Cryptogonus lijiangiensis
- Cryptogonus linguilatus
- Cryptogonus lobulus
- Cryptogonus loebli
- Cryptogonus nitidus
- Cryptogonus ocellatus
- Cryptogonus ohtai
- Cryptogonus oncotrichus
- Cryptogonus orbiculus
- Cryptogonus parorbiculus
- Cryptogonus polytrichus
- Cryptogonus postmedialis
- Cryptogonus pulicaris
- Cryptogonus qianjiangensis
- Cryptogonus quadriguttatus
- Cryptogonus reniformis
- Cryptogonus robustus
- Cryptogonus sagittiformis
- Cryptogonus schraiki
- Cryptogonus trifurcatus
- Cryptogonus trioblitus
- Cryptogonus tristis
- Cryptogonus wuzhishanus
- Cryptogonus xiushanensis
- Cryptogonus yunnanensis
