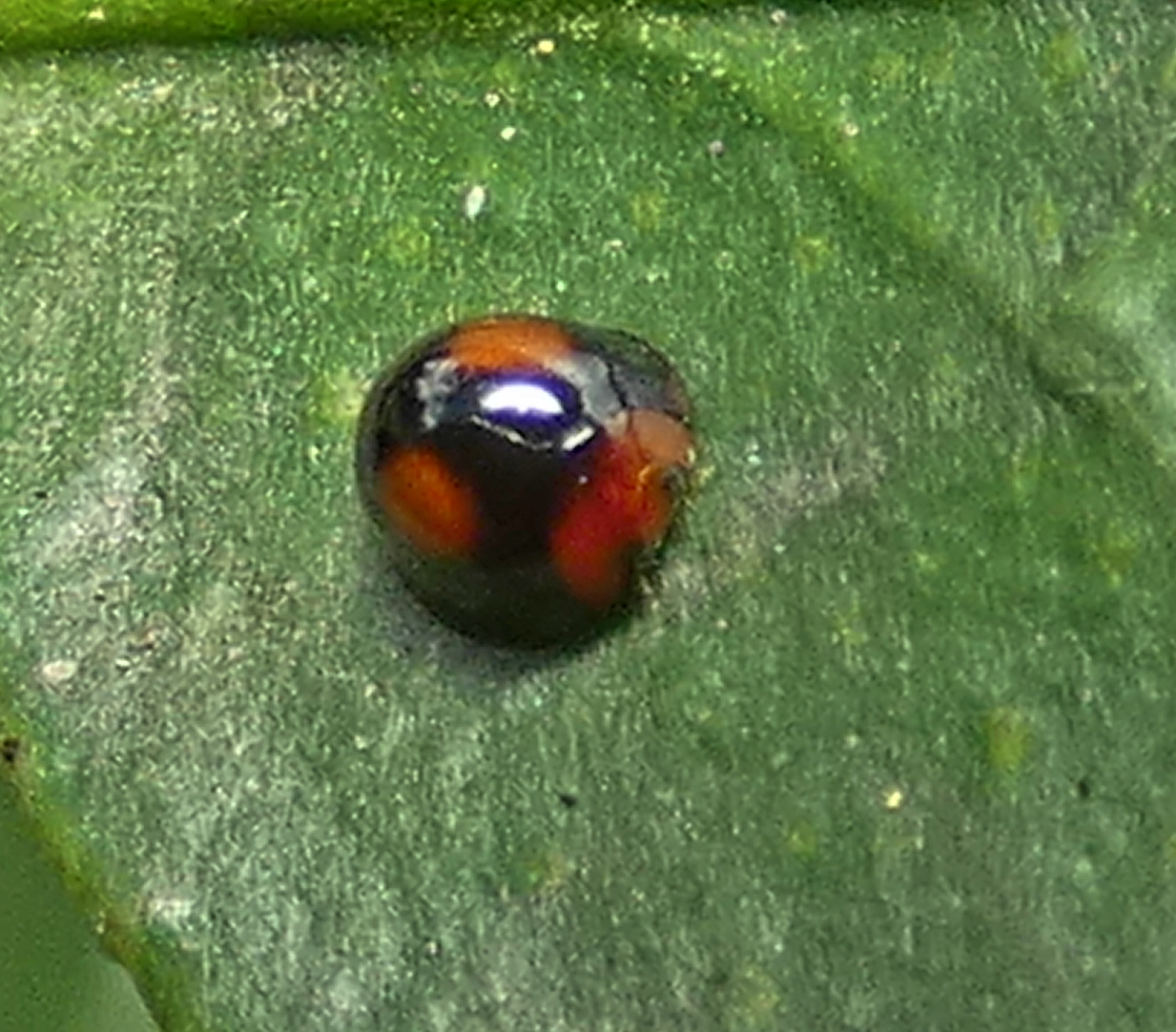
- Cryptognatha amabilis

Scientific classification
- Kingdom: Animalia
- Phylum: Arthropoda
- Clade: Pancrustacea
- Class: Insecta
- Order: Coleoptera
- Suborder: Polyphaga
- Infraorder: Cucujiformia
- Family: Coccinellidae
- Tribe: Cryptognathini
- Genus: Cryptognatha; Mulsant, 1850

= Cryptognatha =

Genus of beetles

Cryptognatha is a genus of lady beetles in the family Coccinellidae. There are at least three described species in Cryptognatha.

== Species ==
These species belong to the genus Cryptognatha:

- Cryptognatha aethiops
- Cryptognatha alberycae
- Cryptognatha amabilis
- Cryptognatha amicta
- Cryptognatha auriculata Mulsant, 1850
- Cryptognatha batesii
- Cryptognatha castanea
- Cryptognatha celia
- Cryptognatha circumdata
- Cryptognatha circumducta
- Cryptognatha clarkii
- Cryptognatha della
- Cryptognatha erythrodera
- Cryptognatha fenestrata
- Cryptognatha flaviceps
- Cryptognatha gabrieli
- Cryptognatha gayle
- Cryptognatha gemelata Mulsant, 1850
- Cryptognatha hannah
- Cryptognatha karla
- Cryptognatha kellie
- Cryptognatha melanodera
- Cryptognatha melanura
- Cryptognatha nodiceps Marshall, 1912 (coconut scale predator)
- Cryptognatha ocularis
- Cryptognatha pam
- Cryptognatha pectoralis
- Cryptognatha pudibunda
- Cryptognatha reedii
- Cryptognatha rufoterminata
- Cryptognatha shelia
- Cryptognatha subaequalis
- Cryptognatha terminata
- Cryptognatha vicki
- Cryptognatha violacea
- Cryptognatha weisei
- Cryptognatha whitney
- Cryptognatha yolandi
