= Cryptogonus ohtai =

Scientific classification
- Kingdom: Animalia
- Phylum: Arthropoda
- Clade: Pancrustacea
- Class: Insecta
- Order: Coleoptera
- Suborder: Polyphaga
- Infraorder: Cucujiformia
- Family: Coccinellidae
- Genus: Cryptogonus
- Species: C. ohtai

Binomial name
- Cryptogonus ohtai Sasaji, 1968

Species of beetle

Cryptogonus ohtai is a species of beetle of the family Coccinellidae. It is found in Taiwan.

== Description ==
Adults reach a length of about 2.3–2.8 mm (0.091–0.110 in). The head is pale yellowish brown, with a black underside in males. The pronotum is black, with the anterior margin and markings at the anterior corners yellowish brown in males. The scutellum is black and the elytra vary in colour, ranging from black with two orange brown markings each, to pale yellowish brown with a black sutural band, margins and markings.

== Etymology ==
The species is dedicated to Mr. Y. Ohta.
