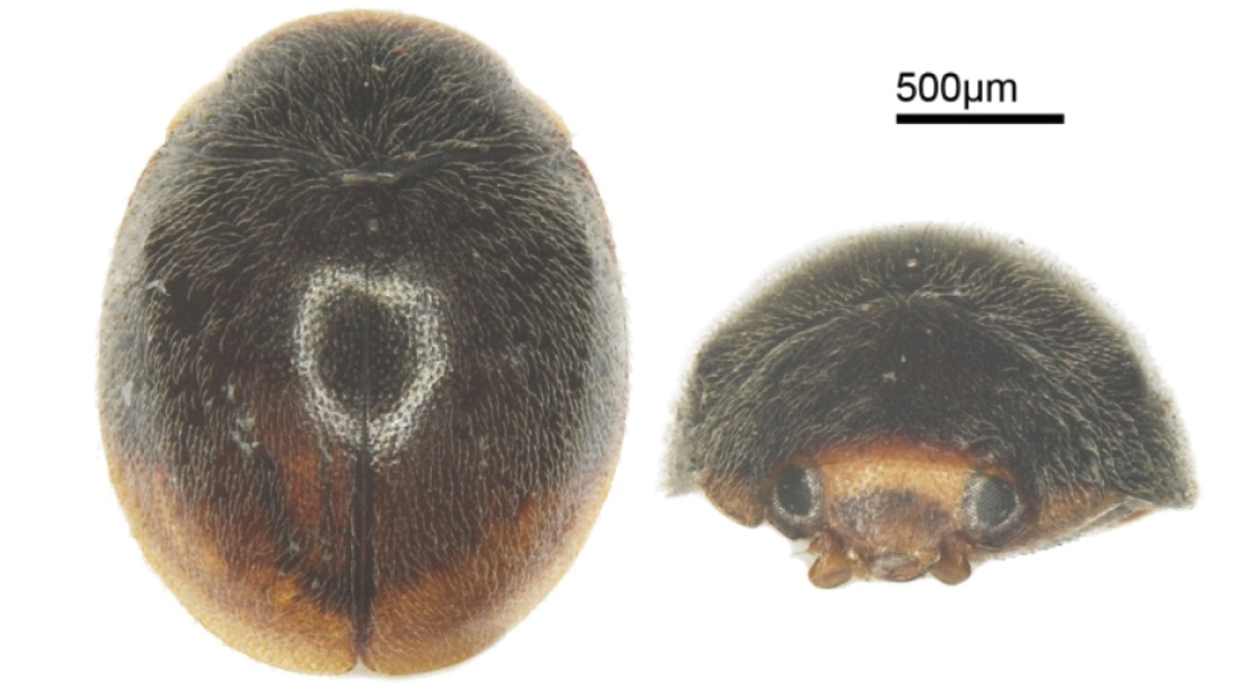
- Pseudaspidimerus palatus

Scientific classification
- Kingdom: Animalia
- Phylum: Arthropoda
- Clade: Pancrustacea
- Class: Insecta
- Order: Coleoptera
- Suborder: Polyphaga
- Infraorder: Cucujiformia
- Family: Coccinellidae
- Subfamily: Coccinellinae
- Tribe: Aspidimerini
- Genus: Pseudaspidimerus; Kapur, 1948

Type species
- Platynaspis circumflexa Motschulsky, 1858

Diversity
- About 11 species

= Pseudaspidimerus =

Genus of beetles

Pseudaspidimerus is a genus of beetles belonging to the family Coccinellidae. The genus has primarily Oriental origin and consists with 11 described species.

== Description ==
Body small, rounded to oval, or convex, and covered with dense pubescence. Clypeus narrowly expanded laterally over the eyes. Antennae very short, and with nine segments. The basal segment is the largest segment, where as second segment is subtriangular. The other segments form a gradually enlarged club, and the terminal segment is conical-shaped. Mentum obcordiform. Prosternal process is well developed, sub rectangular, and carinate. Abdomen consists with six visible sternites. Male has a robust penis.

== Biology ==
Species are primarily aphidophagus, but also associated with mealybugs, scales and whiteflies. Grubs are almost similar to scales, and are often overlooked.

== Species ==
- Pseudaspidimerus cornutus Huo, 2014 - Laos
- Pseudaspidimerus flaviceps (Walker 1859) - India, Sri Lanka
- Pseudaspidimerus hoangi Kovář, 2007 - Vietnam, China
- Pseudaspidimerus infuscatus Kapur, 1967 - India
- Pseudaspidimerus lambai Kapur, 1967 - Andaman Islands
- Pseudaspidimerus mauliki Kapur, 1948 - India, Sri Lanka, Bangladesh, Thailand, Java
- Pseudaspidimerus palatus Huo & Wang, 2017 - Thailand, Malaysia, Singapore
- Pseudaspidimerus pulcher (Weise, 1908) - Indonesia
- Pseudaspidimerus toulakhomi Huo, 2014 - Laos
- Pseudaspidimerus trinotatus (Thunberg, 1781) - India, Sri Lanka, Myanmar
- Pseudaspidimerus uttami Kapur, 1948 - India and Sri Lanka
