= Pseudaspidimerus uttami =

Scientific classification
- Kingdom: Animalia
- Phylum: Arthropoda
- Clade: Pancrustacea
- Class: Insecta
- Order: Coleoptera
- Suborder: Polyphaga
- Infraorder: Cucujiformia
- Family: Coccinellidae
- Genus: Pseudaspidimerus
- Species: P. uttami

Binomial name
- Pseudaspidimerus uttami Kapur, 1948

Species of beetle

Pseudaspidimerus uttami is a species of lady beetle native to Sri Lanka. Records from India are based on misidentifications.

== Description ==
Adults reach a length of about 2.46 mm (0.097 in). They are shiny black, with the anterolateral corners of the pronotum yellow, and each elytron with a median orange yellow spot or fully melanic and without spots.

== Biology ==
It is a predator of several whiteflies, aphids and scale insects such as Aphis gossypii, and Planococcus citri.
