= Cryptogonus ariasi =

Scientific classification
- Kingdom: Animalia
- Phylum: Arthropoda
- Clade: Pancrustacea
- Class: Insecta
- Order: Coleoptera
- Suborder: Polyphaga
- Infraorder: Cucujiformia
- Family: Coccinellidae
- Genus: Cryptogonus
- Species: C. ariasi

Binomial name
- Cryptogonus ariasi (Mulsant, 1853)

Synonyms
- Aspidimerus ariasi Mulsant, 1853; Cryptogonus nepalensis Bielawski, 1972; Cryptogonus nepalensis bhutanensis Bielawski, 1979

Species of beetle

Cryptogonus ariasi is a species of beetle of the family Coccinellidae. It is found in India (Assam, Himachal Pradesh, Manipur, Meghalaya, Mizoram, Sikkim, Uttarakhand), Nepal, China and Myanmar.

== Description ==
Adults reach a length of about 3–3.2 mm (0.12–0.13 in). The head is yellow, while the pronotum is yellow with a black macula on the posterior margin and with yellowish-reddish lateral and anterior margins. The elytra are yellow with five black spots.

== Life history ==
They have been recorded preying on Aphis gossypii.
