= Cryptogonus quadriguttatus =

Scientific classification
- Kingdom: Animalia
- Phylum: Arthropoda
- Clade: Pancrustacea
- Class: Insecta
- Order: Coleoptera
- Suborder: Polyphaga
- Infraorder: Cucujiformia
- Family: Coccinellidae
- Genus: Cryptogonus
- Species: C. quadriguttatus

Binomial name
- Cryptogonus quadriguttatus (Weise, 1895)

Synonyms
- Aspidiphorus quadriguttatus Weise, 1895; Cryptogonus quadriguttatus var. confluens Kapur, 1948; Cryptogonus quadriguttatus var. nigriscens Kapur, 1948

Species of beetle

Cryptogonus quadriguttatus is a species of beetle of the family Coccinellidae. It is found in India (Arunachal Pradesh, Assam, Manipur, Mizoram, Nagaland, Punjab, Sikkim, Uttarakhand, Uttar Pradesh, West Bengal, Tripura), Bhutan and China.

== Description ==
Adults reach a length of about 2.7–3 mm (0.11–0.12 in). The head is black in females and yellow in males. The pronotum is dark pitchy brown to black, with yellowish anterolateral corners. The elytra are dark brown to black, with four yellow or orange yellow spots.

== Life history ==
They have been recorded preying on various Aphididae species, as well as Oligonychus coffeae.
