= Pseudaspidimerus infuscatus =

Scientific classification
- Kingdom: Animalia
- Phylum: Arthropoda
- Clade: Pancrustacea
- Class: Insecta
- Order: Coleoptera
- Suborder: Polyphaga
- Infraorder: Cucujiformia
- Family: Coccinellidae
- Genus: Pseudaspidimerus
- Species: P. infuscatus

Binomial name
- Pseudaspidimerus infuscatus Poorani, 2001

Species of beetle

Pseudaspidimerus infuscatus is a species of beetle of the family Coccinellidae. It is found in India (Western Ghats, Tamil Nadu).

== Description ==
Adults reach a length of about 1.6–1.85 mm (0.063–0.073 in). The dorsal surface is reddish testaceous to darker brownish-testaceous, with the head lighter yellow and the sutural and surrounding areas of the elytra infuscate with dark brown or black. The scutellum is dark brownish testaceous.

== Life history ==
They have been recorded preying on aphids, including Aphis gossypii.
