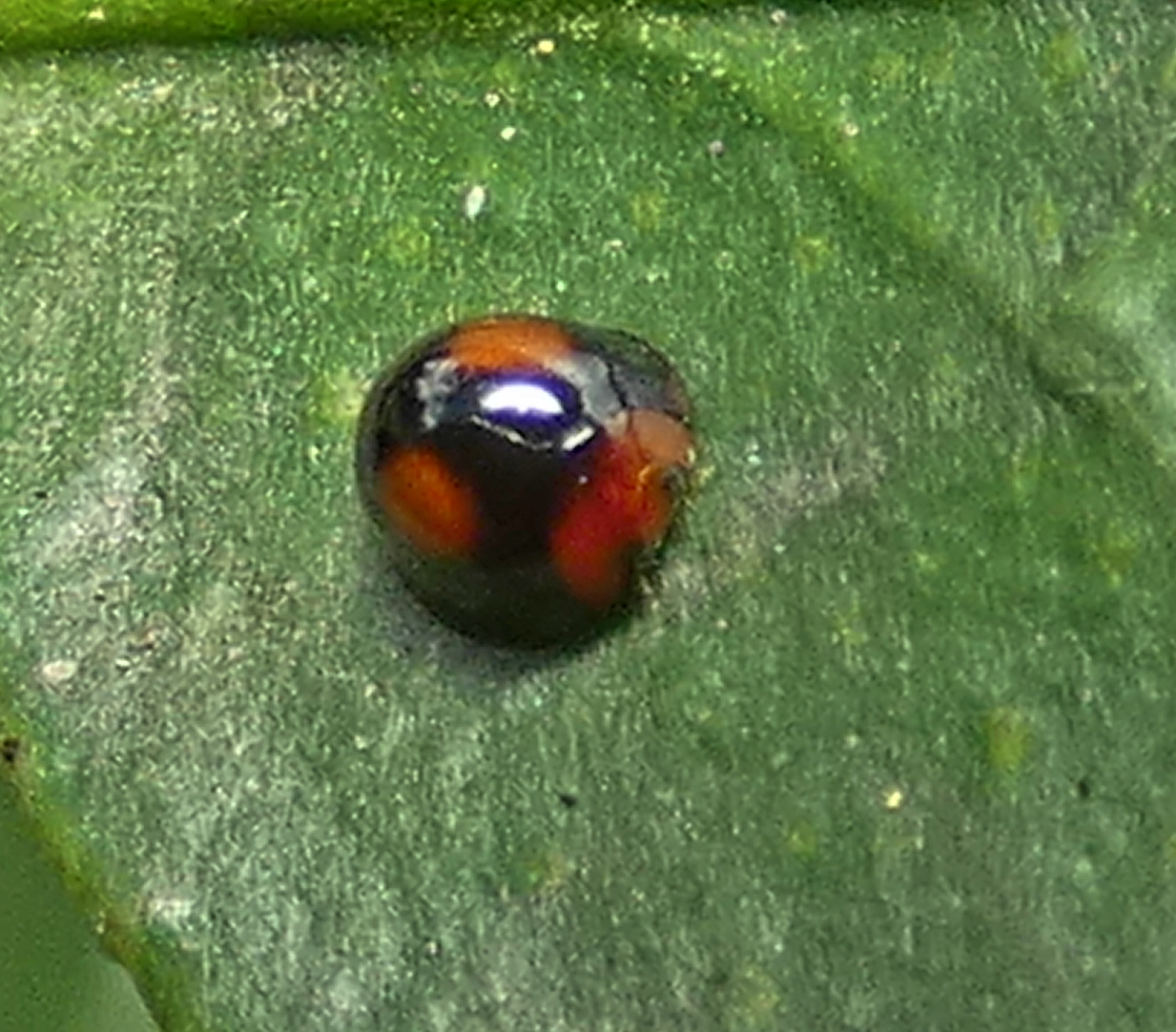

Scientific classification
- Kingdom: Animalia
- Phylum: Arthropoda
- Clade: Pancrustacea
- Class: Insecta
- Order: Coleoptera
- Suborder: Polyphaga
- Infraorder: Cucujiformia
- Family: Coccinellidae
- Genus: Cryptognatha
- Species: C. amabilis

Binomial name
- Cryptognatha amabilis Gorham, 1899

= Cryptognatha amabilis =

Species of beetle

Cryptognatha amabilis is a species of beetle of the family Coccinellidae. It is found in Brazil (Pernambuco).

== Description ==
Adults reach a length of about 2–2.4 mm (0.079–0.094 in). The head and pronotum are reddish-brown, the latter darkened at the base. The elytra are black with a greenish sheen, each with a brownish-orange spot on the disc and a brownish-orange apical quarter. The underside, legs and antennae are brown.
