= Melanaphis pyraria =

Scientific classification
- Domain: Eukaryota
- Kingdom: Animalia
- Phylum: Arthropoda
- Class: Insecta
- Order: Hemiptera
- Suborder: Sternorrhyncha
- Family: Aphididae
- Genus: Melanaphis
- Species: M. pyraria

Binomial name
- Melanaphis pyraria (Passerini, 1861)

Synonyms
- Myzus pyrarius

Species of aphid

Melanaphis pyraria is a species of aphid. It is a pest of millets.
