= Cryptogonus downingi =

Scientific classification
- Kingdom: Animalia
- Phylum: Arthropoda
- Clade: Pancrustacea
- Class: Insecta
- Order: Coleoptera
- Suborder: Polyphaga
- Infraorder: Cucujiformia
- Family: Coccinellidae
- Genus: Cryptogonus
- Species: C. downingi

Binomial name
- Cryptogonus downingi Kapur, 1948

Species of beetle

Cryptogonus downingi is a species of beetle of the family Coccinellidae. It is found in Myanmar.

== Description ==
Adults reach a length of about 2.8 mm (0.11 in). The head is orange-yellow and the pronotum is black with yellowish anterolateral corners. The elytra are black with a reddish testaceous apical half and a black margin, as well as a testaceous band on each elytron.
