= Cryptognatha rufoterminata =

Scientific classification
- Kingdom: Animalia
- Phylum: Arthropoda
- Clade: Pancrustacea
- Class: Insecta
- Order: Coleoptera
- Suborder: Polyphaga
- Infraorder: Cucujiformia
- Family: Coccinellidae
- Genus: Cryptognatha
- Species: C. rufoterminata

Binomial name
- Cryptognatha rufoterminata Champion, 1913

Species of beetle

Cryptognatha rufoterminata is a species of beetle of the family Coccinellidae. It is found in Panama.

== Description ==
Adults reach a length of about 2.2 mm (0.087 in). They have a hemispherical, very convex, shining and glabrous body. The head, thorax and apex of the elytra are rufous, while the rest of the elytra is cupreo-aeneous. Part of the underside and the legs are obscure ferruginous. The head and thorax are closely and minutely, while the elytra are more sparsely and a little more coarsely punctate.
