= Cryptognatha circumducta =

Scientific classification
- Kingdom: Animalia
- Phylum: Arthropoda
- Clade: Pancrustacea
- Class: Insecta
- Order: Coleoptera
- Suborder: Polyphaga
- Infraorder: Cucujiformia
- Family: Coccinellidae
- Genus: Cryptognatha
- Species: C. circumducta

Binomial name
- Cryptognatha circumducta Champion, 1913

Species of beetle

Cryptognatha circumducta is a species of beetle of the family Coccinellidae. It is found in Panama.

== Description ==
Adults reach a length of about 1.8 mm (0.071 in). They have a hemispherical, very convex, moderately shining and glabrous body. They are ferruginous, but the elytra with the base, apex, outer margin, and suture broadly piceous, and the metasternum is also infuscate or piceous. The head, thorax, and elytra are somewhat closely punctulate, with the interspaces alutaceous. The underside is very finely punctate.
