= Cryptogonus bhalwalnensis =

Scientific classification
- Kingdom: Animalia
- Phylum: Arthropoda
- Clade: Pancrustacea
- Class: Insecta
- Order: Coleoptera
- Suborder: Polyphaga
- Infraorder: Cucujiformia
- Family: Coccinellidae
- Genus: Cryptogonus
- Species: C. bhalwalnensis

Binomial name
- Cryptogonus bhalwalnensis Azad & Wang, 2020

Species of beetle

Cryptogonus bhalwalnensis is a species of beetle of the family Coccinellidae. It is found in Pakistan.

== Description ==
Adults reach a length of about 2.02 mm (0.080 in). The head and antennae are yellow and the pronotum is black with yellow spots at the anterior corners. The elytra are black, each with four yellowish spots. The ventral surface is black with the abdomen and legs partially yellow to dark brown.
