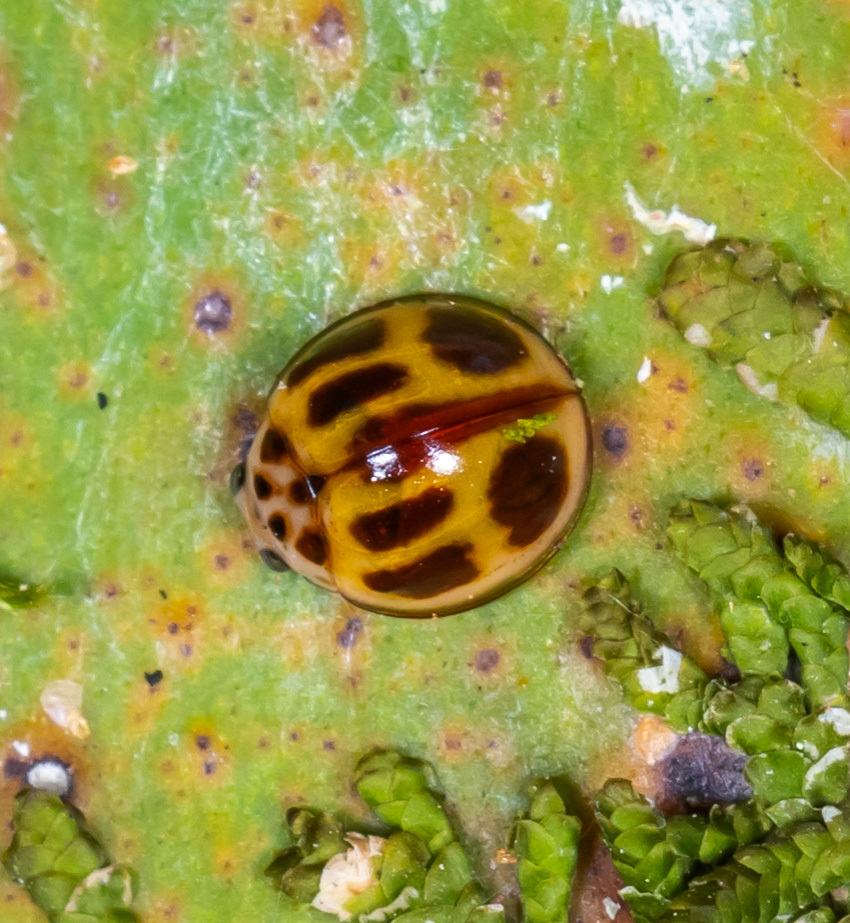
- C. gemellata from Peru

Scientific classification
- Kingdom: Animalia
- Phylum: Arthropoda
- Clade: Pancrustacea
- Class: Insecta
- Order: Coleoptera
- Suborder: Polyphaga
- Infraorder: Cucujiformia
- Family: Coccinellidae
- Genus: Cryptognatha
- Species: C. gemellata

Binomial name
- Cryptognatha gemellata Mulsant, 1850

Synonyms
- Cryptognatha simillima Sicard, 1929

= Cryptognatha gemellata =

Species of beetle

Cryptognatha gemellata is a species of beetle of the family Coccinellidae. It is found in Brazil, Colombia, Panama, Peru and Trinidad.

== Description ==
Adults reach a length of about 1.8–2.7 mm. Adults are yellow. The pronotum has seven pale brown spots and the elytron has three brown spots and a spot on the sutural margin on the disc.
