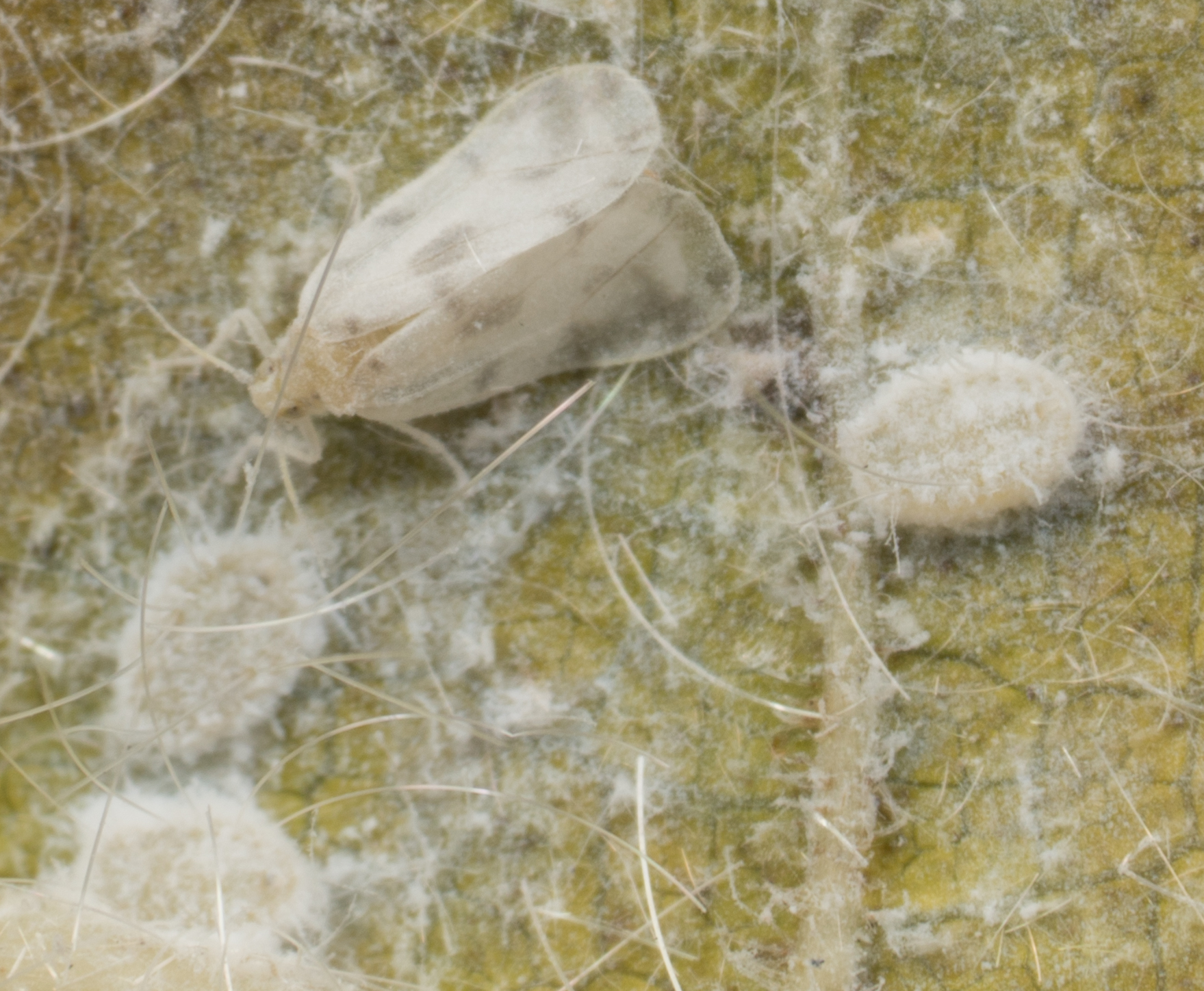
- Aleurodicus dugesii

Scientific classification
- Domain: Eukaryota
- Kingdom: Animalia
- Phylum: Arthropoda
- Class: Insecta
- Order: Hemiptera
- Suborder: Sternorrhyncha
- Family: Aleyrodidae
- Genus: Aleurodicus; Douglas, 1892

= Aleurodicus =

Genus of true bugs

Aleurodicus is a genus of whiteflies in the family Aleyrodidae.

== Species ==
- Aleurodicus antidesmae Corbett, 1926
- Aleurodicus antillensis Dozier, 1936
- Aleurodicus araujoi Sampson & Drews, 1941
- Aleurodicus capiangae Bondar, 1923
- Aleurodicus cinnamomi Takahashi, 1951
- Aleurodicus coccolobae Quaintance & Baker, 1913
- Aleurodicus cocois (Curtis, 1846)
- Aleurodicus destructor Mackie, 1912
- Aleurodicus dispersus Russell, 1965
- Aleurodicus dugesii Cockerell, 1896 (giant whitefly)
- Aleurodicus essigi Sampson & Drews, 1941
- Aleurodicus flavus Hempel, 1922
- Aleurodicus fucatus Bondar, 1923
- Aleurodicus guppyi Quaintance & Baker, 1913
- Aleurodicus holmesii Maskell, 1896
- Aleurodicus indicus Regu & David, 1992
- Aleurodicus inversus Martin, 2004
- Aleurodicus jamaicensis Cockerell, 1902
- Aleurodicus juleikae Bondar, 1923
- Aleurodicus machili Takahashi, 1931
- Aleurodicus magnificus Costa Lima, 1928
- Aleurodicus maritimus Hempel, 1922
- Aleurodicus marmoratus Hempel, 1922
- Aleurodicus neglectus Quaintance & Baker, 1913
- Aleurodicus niveus Martin, 2004
- Aleurodicus ornatus Cockerell, 1893
- Aleurodicus pauciporus Martin, 2004
- Aleurodicus pulvinatus Maskell, 1896
- Aleurodicus rugioperculatus Martin, 2004
- Aleurodicus talamancensis Martin, 2005
- Aleurodicus trinidadensis Quaintance & Baker, 1913
- Aleurodicus vinculus Martin, 2004
- Aleurodicus wallaceus Martin, 1988
