= Cryptognatha kellie =

Scientific classification
- Kingdom: Animalia
- Phylum: Arthropoda
- Clade: Pancrustacea
- Class: Insecta
- Order: Coleoptera
- Suborder: Polyphaga
- Infraorder: Cucujiformia
- Family: Coccinellidae
- Genus: Cryptognatha
- Species: C. kellie

Binomial name
- Cryptognatha kellie González & Hanley, 2019

Species of beetle

Cryptognatha kellie is a species of beetle of the family Coccinellidae. It is found in Guyana.

== Description ==
Adults reach a length of about 2.6–3 mm. Adults are dark brown with a yellow head. The lateral one-third of the pronotum is yellow and the lateral one-fifth of the elytron is brownish.
