= Aspidimerus nigrovittatus =

Scientific classification
- Kingdom: Animalia
- Phylum: Arthropoda
- Clade: Pancrustacea
- Class: Insecta
- Order: Coleoptera
- Suborder: Polyphaga
- Infraorder: Cucujiformia
- Family: Coccinellidae
- Genus: Aspidimerus
- Species: A. nigrovittatus

Binomial name
- Aspidimerus nigrovittatus Motschulsky, 1866

Species of beetle

Aspidimerus nigrovittatus, is a species of lady beetle found in Sri Lanka.

== Description ==
Body subovate, and convex. Body color pale yellow with bright, sparse pubescence. Elytra broad on each side with a black ribbon. This ribbon is not touching at the apex.
