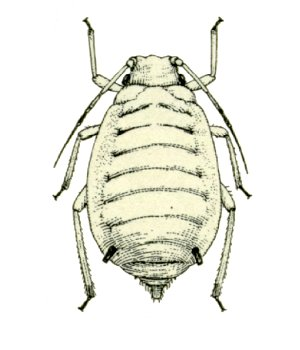
- Melanaphis

Scientific classification
- Domain: Eukaryota
- Kingdom: Animalia
- Phylum: Arthropoda
- Class: Insecta
- Order: Hemiptera
- Suborder: Sternorrhyncha
- Family: Aphididae
- Genus: Melanaphis; Goot, 1917

= Melanaphis =

Genus of insects

Melanaphis is a genus of true bugs belonging to the family Aphididae.

The genus has cosmopolitan distribution, native to the Old World, far more diverse in southeastern Asia.

Species:

- Melanaphis arthraxonophaga Zhang, Likun, Qiao & Guangxue Zhang, 2001
- Melanaphis arundinariae (R.Takahashi, 1937)
- Melanaphis bambusae (Fullaway, 1910)
- Melanaphis daisenensis (Sorin, 1970)
- Melanaphis donacis (Passerini, 1861)
- Melanaphis elizabethae (Ossiannilsson, 1967)
- Melanaphis graminisucta Zhang & Guangxue, 1992
- Melanaphis grossisiphonellus Zhang, Likun, Qiao & Guangxue Zhang, 2001
- Melanaphis jamatonica (Sorin, 1970)
- Melanaphis japonica (R.Takahashi, 1919)
- Melanaphis koreana (Sorin, 1972)
- Melanaphis luzulella (Hille Ris Lambers, 1947)
- Melanaphis meghalayensis
- Melanaphis miscanthi (R.Takahashi, 1921)
- Melanaphis montana (Sorin, 1970)
- Melanaphis pahanensis (R.Takahashi, 1950)
- Melanaphis pyraria (Passerini, 1861)
- Melanaphis pyrisucta Zhang, Guangxue & Qiao, 1999
- Melanaphis sacchari (Zehntner, 1897)
- Melanaphis siphonella (Essig & Kuwana, 1918)
- Melanaphis sorini Halbert & G.Remaudière, 2000
- Melanaphis strobilanthi
- Melanaphis tateyamaensis (Sorin, 1970)
- Melanaphis yasumatsui (Sorin, 1970)
- Melanaphis zhanhuaensis Zhang, Likun, Qiao & Guangxue Zhang, 2001
