= Cryptognatha violacea =

Scientific classification
- Kingdom: Animalia
- Phylum: Arthropoda
- Clade: Pancrustacea
- Class: Insecta
- Order: Coleoptera
- Suborder: Polyphaga
- Infraorder: Cucujiformia
- Family: Coccinellidae
- Genus: Cryptognatha
- Species: C. violacea

Binomial name
- Cryptognatha violacea Champion, 1913

Species of beetle

Cryptognatha violacea is a species of beetle of the family Coccinellidae. It is found in Mexico (Veracruz).

== Description ==
Adults reach a length of about 2.25 mm (0.089 in). They have a hemispherical, very convex, shining and glabrous body. They are cupreo-violaceous, with the head above (in part or entirely) and beneath, the last four ventral segments, and the legs ferruginous. The rest of the undersurface is black. The head and thorax are closely and minutely, and the elytra more sparsely and distinctly punctate. The punctures on the elytra become coarser towards the outer margin.
