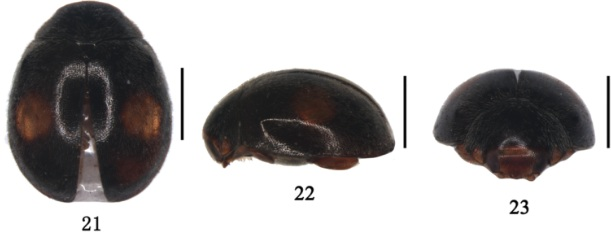

Scientific classification
- Kingdom: Animalia
- Phylum: Arthropoda
- Clade: Pancrustacea
- Class: Insecta
- Order: Coleoptera
- Suborder: Polyphaga
- Infraorder: Cucujiformia
- Family: Coccinellidae
- Genus: Aspidimerus
- Species: A. guangxiensis

Binomial name
- Aspidimerus guangxiensis Yu & Li, 2004

= Aspidimerus guangxiensis =

Species of beetle

Aspidimerus guangxiensis is a species of beetle of the family Coccinellidae. It is found in China (Guangxi).

== Description ==
Adults reach a length of about 2.75–2.8 mm (0.108–0.110 in). They have a small, oval, moderately convex body, with the dorsal surface pubescent. The head is yellow or reddish brown with the eyes black. The pronotum is black, with the basal margin reddish brown and the anterior corners yellowish brown. The scutellum and elytra are black, each elytron with one rounded, yellowish brown spot, situated at the middle of the elytron. The underside is dark brown, except the legs and abdomen, which are reddish brown.
