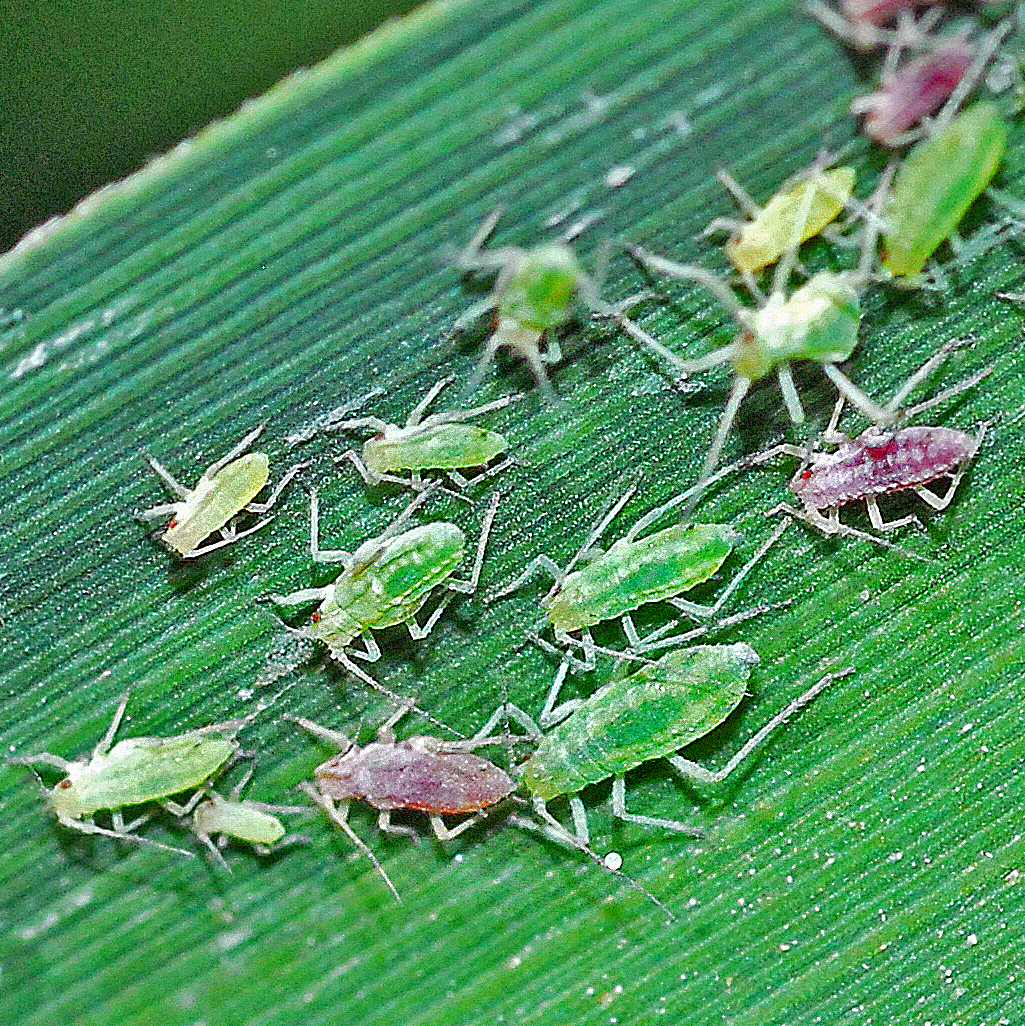
- Colony of Hyalopterus pruni on Phragmites australis

Scientific classification
- Domain: Eukaryota
- Kingdom: Animalia
- Phylum: Arthropoda
- Class: Insecta
- Order: Hemiptera
- Suborder: Sternorrhyncha
- Family: Aphididae
- Genus: Hyalopterus
- Species: H. pruni

Binomial name
- Hyalopterus pruni (Geoffroy, 1762)

Synonyms
- Aphis pruni Geoffroy, 1762

= Hyalopterus pruni =

Species of true bug

Hyalopterus pruni, the mealy plum aphid, is an aphid in the superfamily Aphidoidea in the order Hemiptera. It is a true bug and sucks sap from plants.

== Distribution ==
This species has a cosmopolitan distribution.

== Description ==
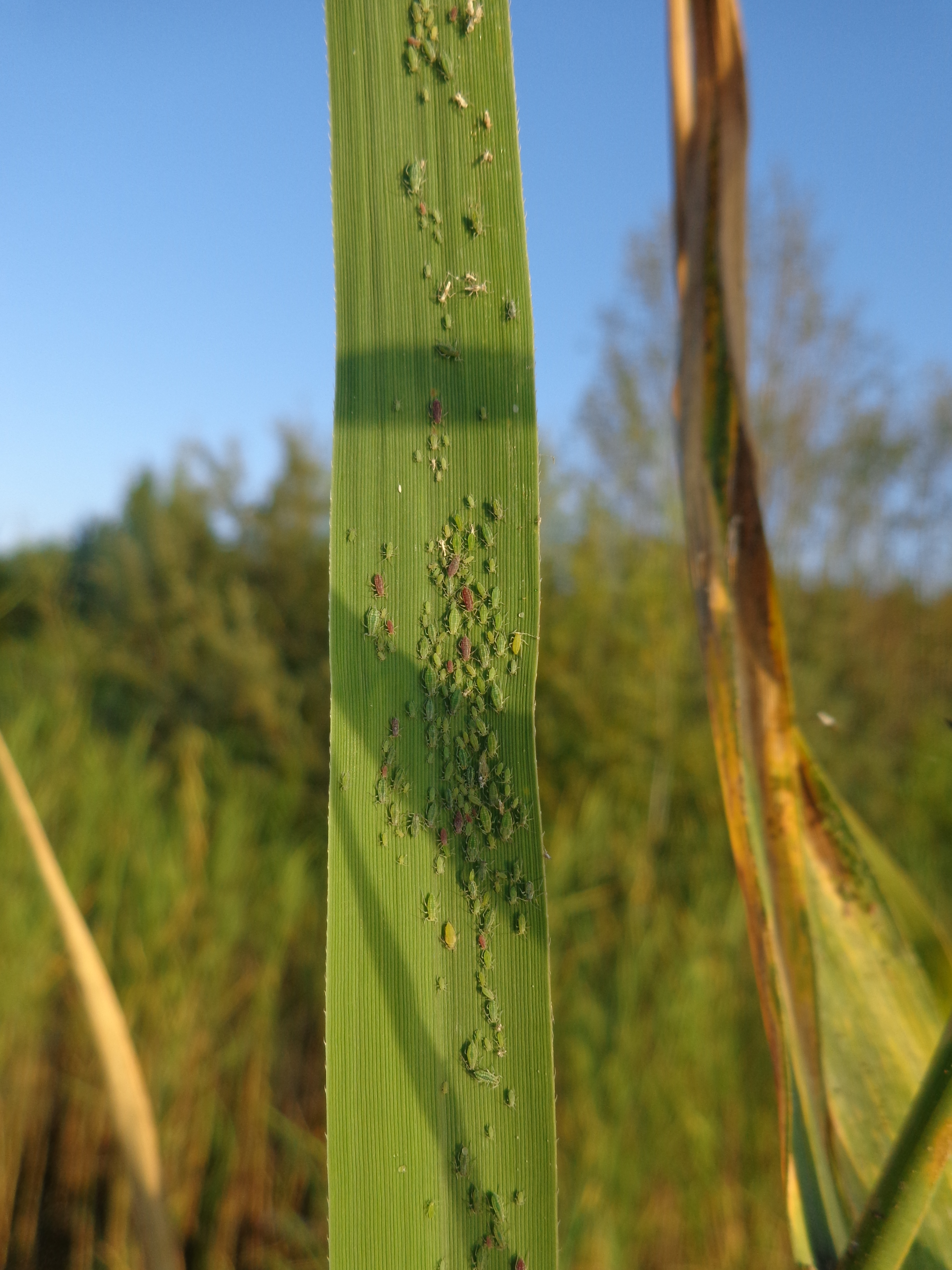
Hyalopterus pruni

Adults of Hyalopterus pruni aptera can reach a body length of about 1.5–2.6 mm (0.059–0.102 in). These small to medium-sized aphids are narrow and oval shaped, with a conical tail and quite short antennae, reaching half the length of the body. They are pale bluish green, while the eyes are red. However some individuals in the colony may be pinkish (“red form”). They are covered of mealy white wax that may make them look gray or light green.

== Biology ==
Hyalopterus pruni can be found from Spring through Fall. The adults remain wingless for 3-13 generations. Winged adults usually appear only in June/July, moving to reed grasses or cattails, while the wingless adults will stay on the host plants. The winged adults lay eggs on the host plants and overwinter in the egg stage, close to the flower buds. Eggs hatch when the buds bloom.

These true bug are sap-feeders. Normally host in Prunus, plum, peach, apricot, peach, almond, Phragmites communis, Arundo donax, reed grasses and cattails. Their nutritional activity produces a quantity of honeydew which remains on the host plants and attracts a variety of insects.

== Bibliography ==
- Antonio Servadei, Sergio Zangheri, Luigi Masutti. Entomologia generale ed applicata. Padova, CEDAM, 1972. (in Italian)
- Aphis pruni Geoffroy, E.L. 1762. Histoire abregée des insectes qui se trouvent aux environs de Paris, dans laquelle ces animaux sont rangés suivant un ordre méthodique. Paris : Durand Vol. 1 viii 523 pp. pls 1–10. [497].
- Blackman, R.L. & Eastop, V.F. 2000. Aphids on the World's Crops. An Identification and Information Guide. Chichester : Wiley x, 466 pp. [280]
- Eastop, V.F. 1966. A taxonomic study of Australian Aphidoidea (Homoptera). Australian Journal of Zoology 14: 399-592 [489]
- Remaudière, G. & Remaudière, M. 1997. Catalogue des Aphididae du monde. Paris : INRA 473 + [3] pp. [60] (list five species-group synonyms)
- First record of the mealy plum aphid Hyalopterus pruni (Geoffroy), (Homoptera, Aphidoidea) in Madeira Island
