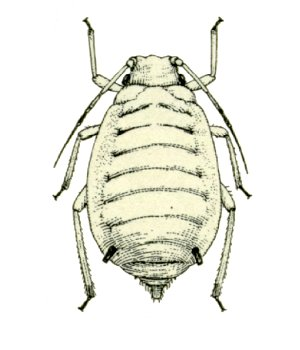

Scientific classification
- Kingdom: Animalia
- Phylum: Arthropoda
- Clade: Pancrustacea
- Class: Insecta
- Order: Hemiptera
- Suborder: Sternorrhyncha
- Family: Aphididae
- Genus: Melanaphis
- Species: M. sacchari

Binomial name
- Melanaphis sacchari (Zehntner, 1897)

= Melanaphis sacchari =

Sugarcane aphid

Species of insect

The sugarcane aphid, (Melanaphis sacchari), is an aphid in the superfamily Aphidoidea in the order Hemiptera. It is a true bug and sucks sap from plants. It is mostly found in Saccharum and Sorghum species. The species primarily reproduces via parthenogenesis, although sexual morphs have been discovered in China, Japan, and Mexico. In China, the eggs overwinter in the host Miscanthus sacchariflorus.
