= Aleurodicus rugioperculatus =

Scientific classification
- Kingdom: Animalia
- Phylum: Arthropoda
- Clade: Pancrustacea
- Class: Insecta
- Order: Hemiptera
- Suborder: Sternorrhyncha
- Family: Aleyrodidae
- Genus: Aleurodicus
- Species: A. rugioperculatus

Binomial name
- Aleurodicus rugioperculatus Martin, 2004

Species of true bug

Aleurodicus rugioperculatus (known variously as the rugose spiraling whitefly, the gumbo limbo spiraling whitefly or just the spiraling whitefly) is a species of whitefly found throughout the Florida Keys. This insect was first described by Jon H. Martin in 2004. It was found infesting the coconut leaves in Andaman & Nicobar islands from India.
