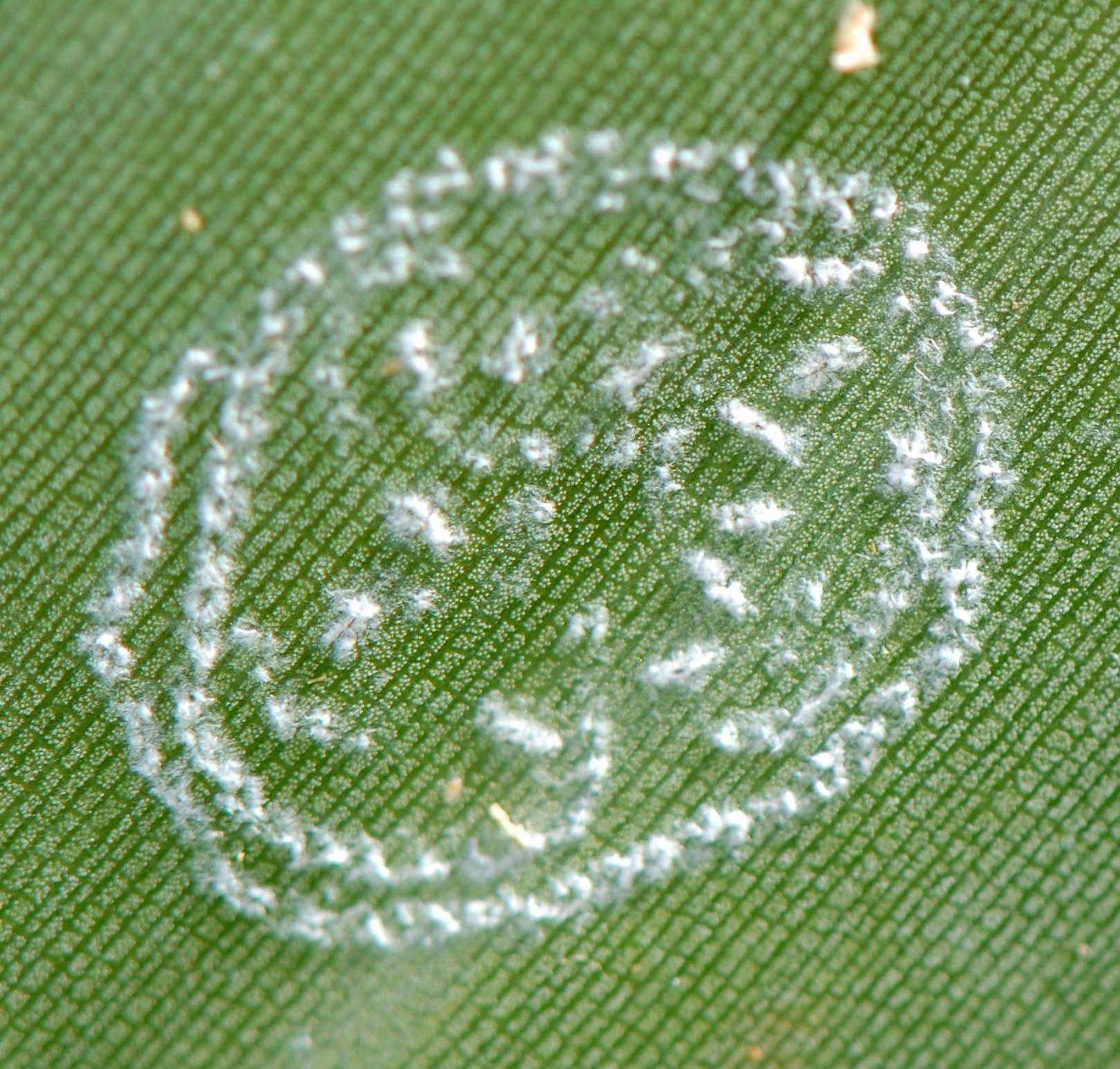

Scientific classification
- Domain: Eukaryota
- Kingdom: Animalia
- Phylum: Arthropoda
- Class: Insecta
- Order: Hemiptera
- Suborder: Sternorrhyncha
- Family: Aleyrodidae
- Genus: Aleurodicus
- Species: A. dispersus

Binomial name
- Aleurodicus dispersus Russell, 1965

= Aleurodicus dispersus =

Species of true bug

Aleurodicus dispersus, the spiralling whitefly, is a species of small, white sap-sucking insect, a true bug in the order Hemiptera. It originated in Central America and the Caribbean region and has spread to many of the world's tropical and subtropical regions, where it has become a major pest of agricultural crops.

== Description ==
Adult spiralling whitefly are small, white, moth-like insects some 1/12-1/8 inch (2–3 mm) long. When they emerge from the pupal casing, the wings are transparent, but they soon become dusted with white fragments of wax. Each of the forewings bear a characteristic pair of black spots and the eyes in this species are a dark reddish brown.

== Distribution ==
Aleurodicus dispersus is native to Central America and the Caribbean but is not regarded as a pest species in these areas. Since the middle of the 20th century it has spread to many parts of the tropics and subtropics. It was found and intercepted in the 1950s on imports into the United States by quarantine officials but later became established in Florida and in 1962 it had reached the Canary Islands. In the early 1980s it had appeared in Hawaii and other Pacific islands and had spread across tropical Asia by the middle of the decade. It had extended its range by the early 1990s to West Africa and India and to parts of the Indian Ocean. In 2009 it was still absent from the Mediterranean region, the Middle East, Hong Kong and most of Australia. It is most common at altitudes of less than 1000 feet (300 metres).

== Biology ==
Aleurodicus dispersus is polyphagous, meaning that it is not reliant on a single host food plant but can feed on many different species of plant. Its host range includes over 100 species in 38 genera and 27 families. Cultivated crops and ornamentals affected by it include banana, coconut, citrus, avocado, breadfruit, mango, macadamia, guava, paw-paw, capsicum, lead tree, frangipani and rose.

The life cycle starts with the deposition of a number of eggs that vary in colour from yellow to tan. These are laid, interspersed with bits of wax, in the form of a spiral on the surface of a leaf, usually on the underside. The eggs hatch after around ten days and pass through four immature stages before becoming adults. The first stage is known as a "crawler" and can move around while the other stages are sedentary. Once settled on the leaf surface, the nymphs start to exude tufts of white wax on the dorsal surface and the third stage nymph additionally produces glass-like waxy rods on its lateral surfaces, which may grow to a length of 0.3 in (8 mm) but usually break off before they reach this length. The first three stages feed by sucking sap from the plant whilst the fourth stage only does so initially, later becoming a puparium while undergoing some internal reorganisation of its tissues.

The adults disperse by flying and females start laying eggs within about one day after emerging from their pupal cases. Unmated females produce exclusively male offspring whereas mated females produce young of both sexes. In the laboratory, the maximum lifespan was found to be 39 days, with 20 pairs of spiralling whitefly producing a total number of 1549 progeny over the course of 37 days.

== Crop damage ==
The spiralling whitefly may cause damage to crops in several ways. The feeding of the adults, and particularly the sucking of sap by the first three nymphal stages, weakens the plant and causes leaves to fall prematurely, but is seldom sufficient to kill the plant. The copious amounts of honeydew secreted by the insects is appreciated by ants, wasps, bees and other insects and these may protect the whitefly from predation. Sooty mould often grows on the honeydew and may reduce the leaf area available for photosynthesis, disfigure the plant and even make it unmarketable. The nymphs produce a flocculent white waxy material and this may be dispersed by the wind and create "an unsightly nuisance". The spiralling whitefly can act as a vector and is one of only three species of whitefly able to transmit plant viruses. In some cases, these may cause the complete loss of the crop.

== Pest status ==
Aleurodicus dispersus is considered to be a major agricultural pest. Despite the application of quarantine measures it has spread rapidly in the tropics and caused the loss of many millions of dollars through lower crop yields. Biological control by the introduction of predators such as ladybirds and parasitic wasps has proved quite effective. When a new area is invaded, at first the whitefly flourish unchecked, but in the course of time, the predators begin to exert some control and populations become more stable and start to reduce.
