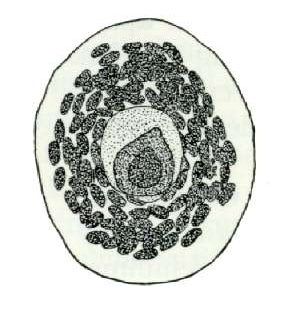
- Aspidiotus destructor

Scientific classification
- Domain: Eukaryota
- Kingdom: Animalia
- Phylum: Arthropoda
- Class: Insecta
- Order: Hemiptera
- Suborder: Sternorrhyncha
- Family: Diaspididae
- Genus: Aspidiotus
- Species: A. destructor

Binomial name
- Aspidiotus destructor Signoret, 1869

= Aspidiotus destructor =

Species of true bug

Aspidiotus destructor, the coconut scale, is a species of armoured scale insect in the family Diaspididae, found in many tropical and subtropical parts of the world. It is a serious pest of coconut and banana, and attacks a range of other fruiting trees and ornamental plants.

== Description ==
All but the first instar nymphs live under the protection of a waxy test or scale and remain in one place. First instar nymphs have legs and move about looking for somewhere to settle. Second instar and adult females have rounded, flattish tests up to 2 mm (0.08 in) in diameter. They have no eyes or appendages, and their soft yellow bodies are visible through the translucent test, giving them the appearance of miniature fried eggs. Males have smaller, more elongated tests, and pass through a pseudo-pupal stage before metamorphosing into reddish, gnat-like insects with eyes, antennae, legs and wings, but no mouthparts.

== Distribution ==
Aspidiotus destructor has a global distribution in tropical and subtropical regions. It is believed to have originated in South Asia but has spread to other parts of Asia, Australia, Africa, Brazil, Central America, the Caribbean region and North America. Its accidental introduction to various Pacific Islands where it lacked natural enemies caused much crop loss.

== Hosts ==
Aspidiotus destructor is a major pest of coconut, but also feeds on various fruit trees and ornamental plants; these include banana, apple, avocado, breadfruit, citrus, grape, guava, mango, ficus, camellia, papaya, ginger, bird of paradise, sugarcane, plumeria and oil palms. On coconut it infests the under surface of the leaves, the leaf stalks, flowers and small fruit, causing discolouration, chlorosis and distortion.

== Life cycle ==
Mature females lay a batch of up to about 65 eggs over a ten-day period, retaining them under the test. When first hatched, the nymphs are known as "crawlers" and move to other parts of the plant before settling. Having moulted, they start sucking sap from the host plant; females will remain static for the rest of their lives, but males will become mobile after their final moult. Mature females release a pheromone to attract males. A female will lay several batches of eggs before dying, but adult males do not feed and soon die.

== Biological control ==
Aspidiotus destructor was causing severe damage to both coconuts and bananas on Guam in the early 1900s. Several parasites and predators were introduced in an attempt to control the scale without much success, until the coconut scale predator (Cryptognatha nodiceps) was introduced from Trinidad and successfully controlled the pest within nine months. This lady beetle was successful where the other predators had failed because of its voracious appetite, its fecundity, and its ability to seek out and feed on other prey species when the scale population diminished. It was equally successful in Príncipe in West Africa in the 1950s, but other species of lady beetle have been more effective in Mauritius and the New Hebrides.
