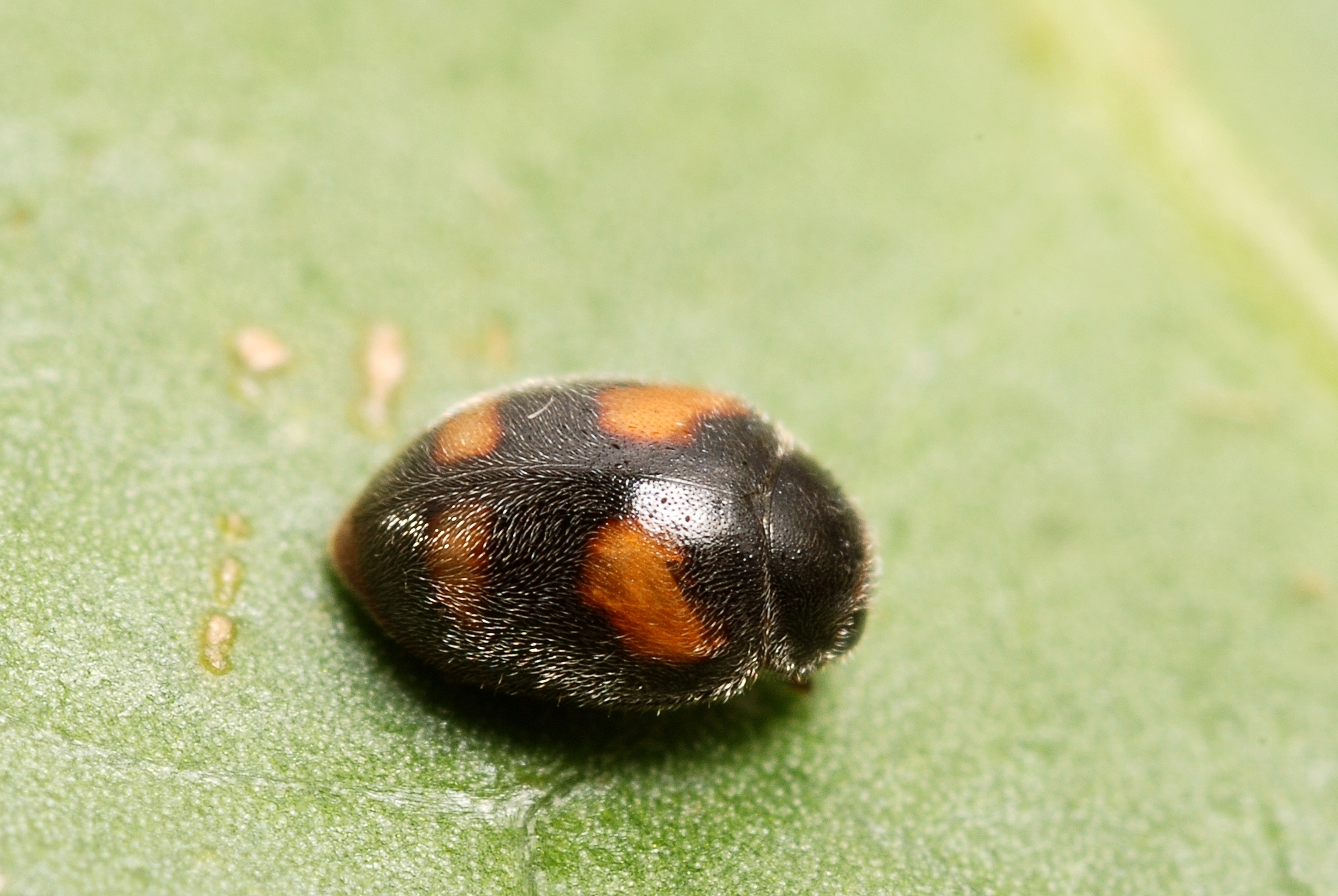
- Nephus quadrimaculatus

Scientific classification
- Kingdom: Animalia
- Phylum: Arthropoda
- Class: Insecta
- Order: Coleoptera
- Suborder: Polyphaga
- Infraorder: Cucujiformia
- Family: Coccinellidae
- Subfamily: Scymninae; Mulsant, 1846

Tribes
- Aspidimerini; Brachiacanthadini; Cryptognathini; Hyperaspidini; Pentiliini; Scymnini; Selvadiini; Stethorini

= Scymninae =

Subfamily of beetles

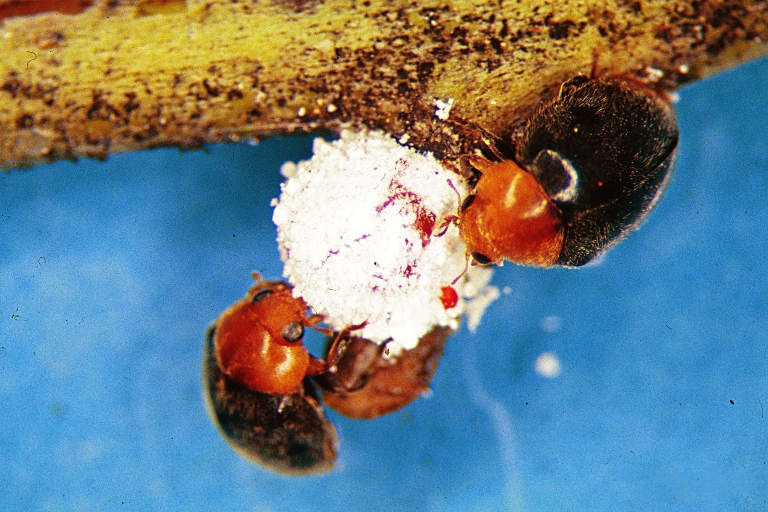
Cryptolaemus montrouzieri with aphids

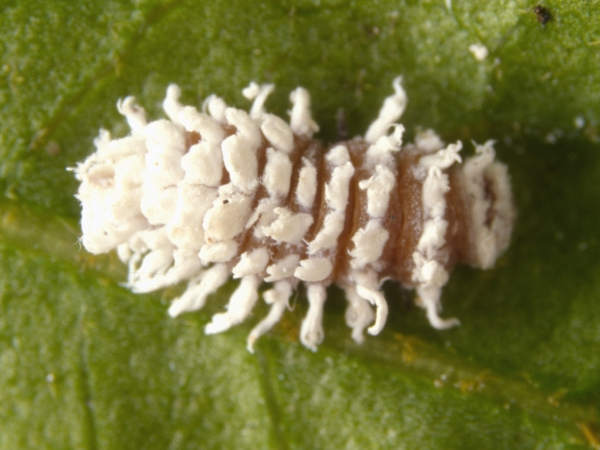
Larva of Cryptolaemus montrouzieri with wax secretions

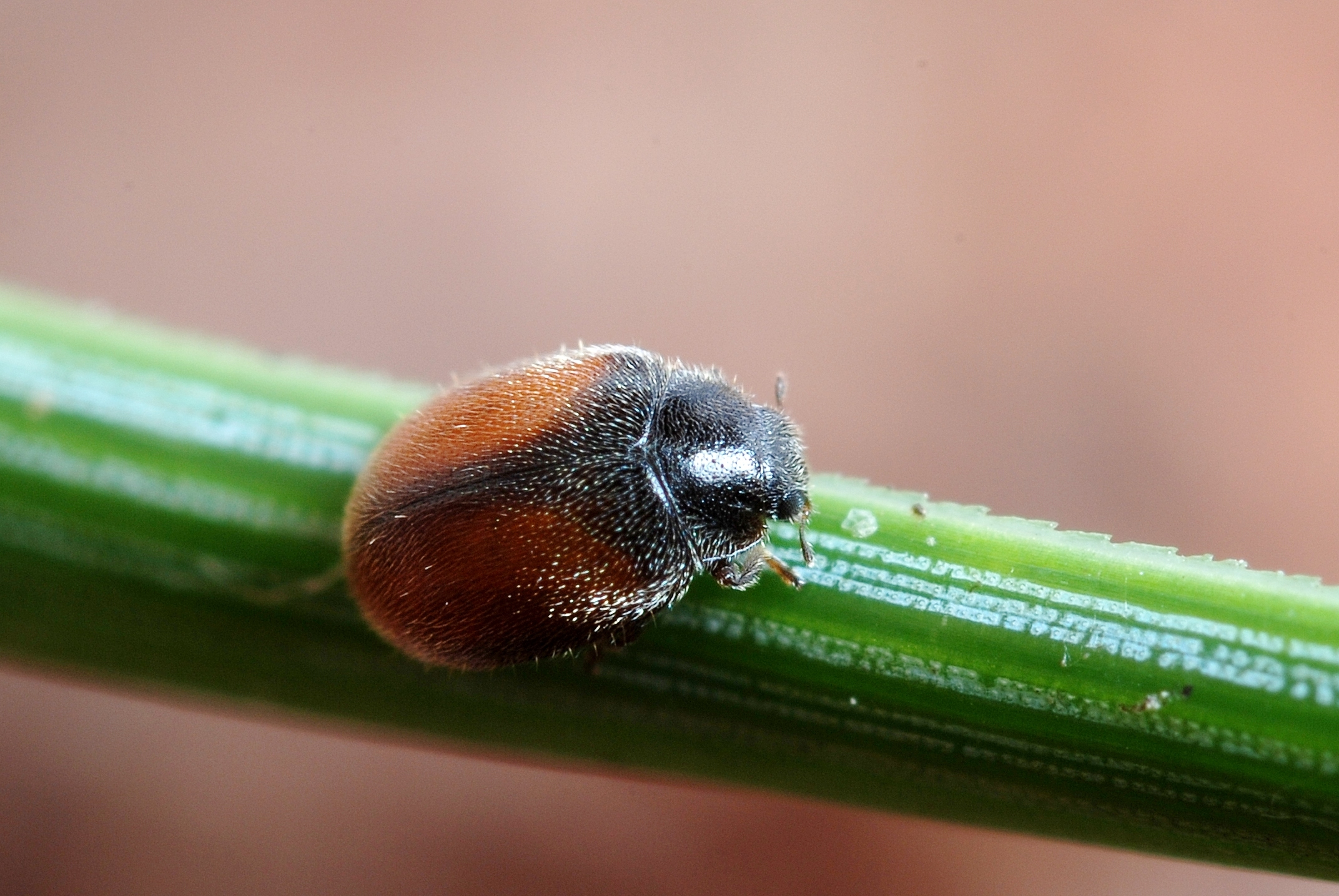
Striped dwarf pine ladybird (Scymnus suturalis)

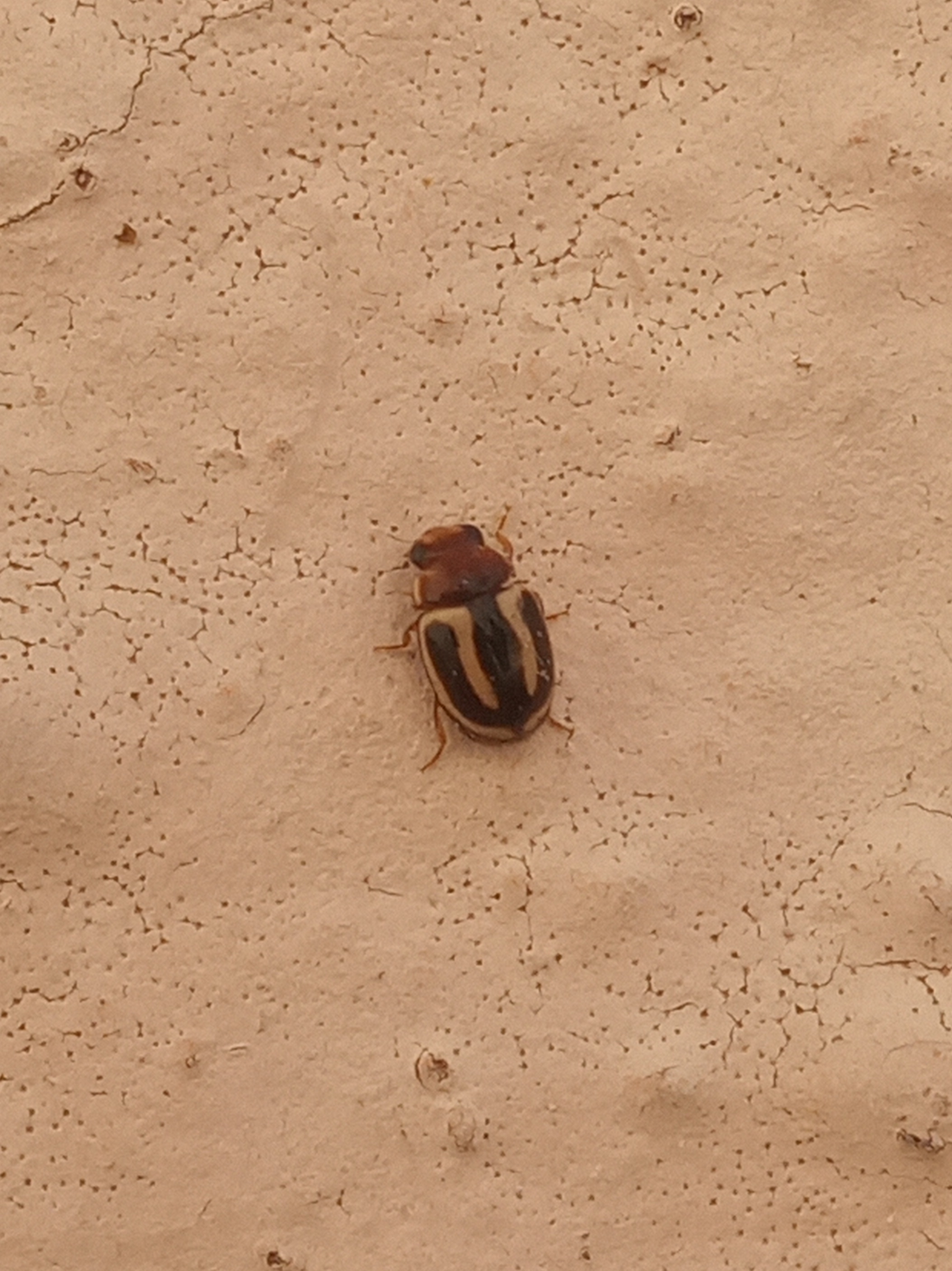
Pied ladybug ladybird (Hyperaspidius sp.)

Scymninae is a subfamily of beetles in the family Coccinellidae. There are at least 170 described species in Scymninae.

== Genera ==
- Acarinus Kapur, 1948
- Acoccidula Barowskij, 1931
- Andrzej Slipinski, 2007
- Aponephus Booth, 1991
- Apseudoscymnus Hoang, 1984
- Aspidimerus Mulsant, 1850
- Axinoscymnus Kamiya, 1963
- Blaisdelliana Gordon, 1970
- Brachiacantha Chevrolat in Dejean, 1837 (spurleg lady beetles)
- Calloeneis Grote, 1873
- Clitostethus Weise, 1885 (=Nephaspis)
- Crypticolus Strohecker, 1953
- Cryptognatha Mulsant, 1850
- Cryptogonus Mulsant, 1850
- Curticornis Gordon, 1971
- Cyra Mulsant, 1850
- Cyrema Blackburn, 1889
- Decadiomus Chapin, 1933
- Diazonema Weise, 1926
- Dichaina Weise, 1926
- Didion Casey, 1899
- Diomus Mulsant, 1850
- Erratodiomus Gordon, 1999
- Helesius Casey, 1899
- Heterodiomus Brèthes, 1924
- Hinda Mulsant, 1850
- Horniolus Weise, 1901
- Hyperaspidius Crotch, 1873
- Hyperaspis Chevrolat in Dejean, 1837
- Keiscymnus Sasaji, 1971
- Leptoscymnus Iablokoff-Khnzorian, 1978
- Magnodiomus Gordon, 1999
- Midus Mulsant, 1850
- Mimoscymnus Gordon, 1994
- Moiradiomus Vandenberg & Hanson, 2019
- Nephus Mulsant, 1846
- Parasidis Brèthes, 1924
- Pentilia Mulsant, 1850
- Planorbata Gordon, 1994
- Platynaspis Redtenbacher, 1843
- Propiptus Weise, 1901
- Pseudaspidimerus Kapur, 1948
- Pullosidis Fürsch, 1987
- Sasajiscymnus Vandenberg, 2004
- Scymniscus Dobzhanskiy, 1928
- Scymnobius Casey, 1899
- Scymnus Kugelann, 1794
- Selvadius Casey, 1899 (amber lady beetles)
- Stethorus Weise, 1885 (spider mite destroyers)
- Thalassa Mulsant, 1850
- Tiphysa Mulsant, 1850
- Veronicobius Broun, 1893
- Viridigloba Gordon, 1978
- Zagloba Casey, 1899 (scalehunter lady beetles)
- Zilus Mulsant, 1850 (velvethead lady beetles)
