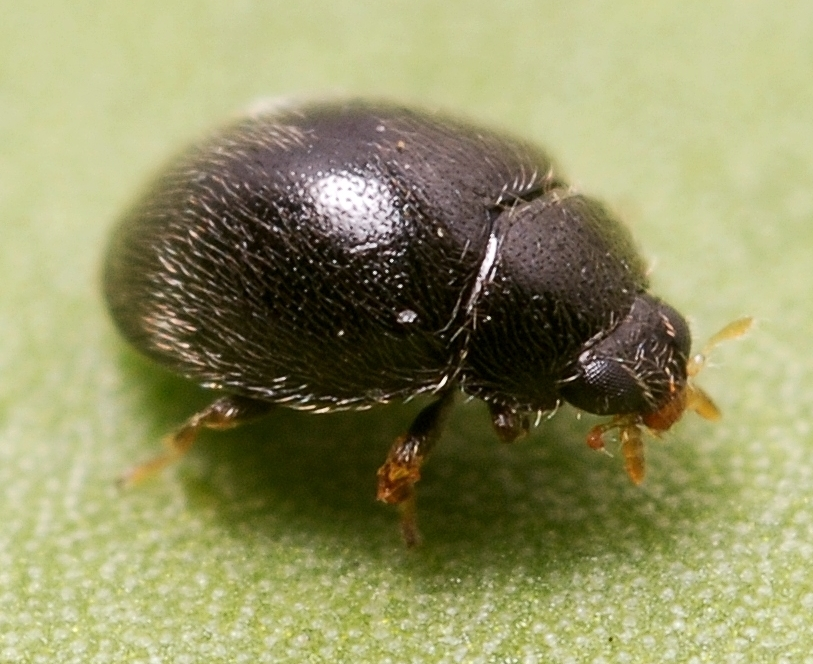
- Stethorus punctillum

Scientific classification
- Kingdom: Animalia
- Phylum: Arthropoda
- Class: Insecta
- Order: Coleoptera
- Suborder: Polyphaga
- Infraorder: Cucujiformia
- Family: Coccinellidae
- Subfamily: Scymninae
- Tribe: Scymnini; Mulsant, 1850

= Scymnini =

Tribe of beetles

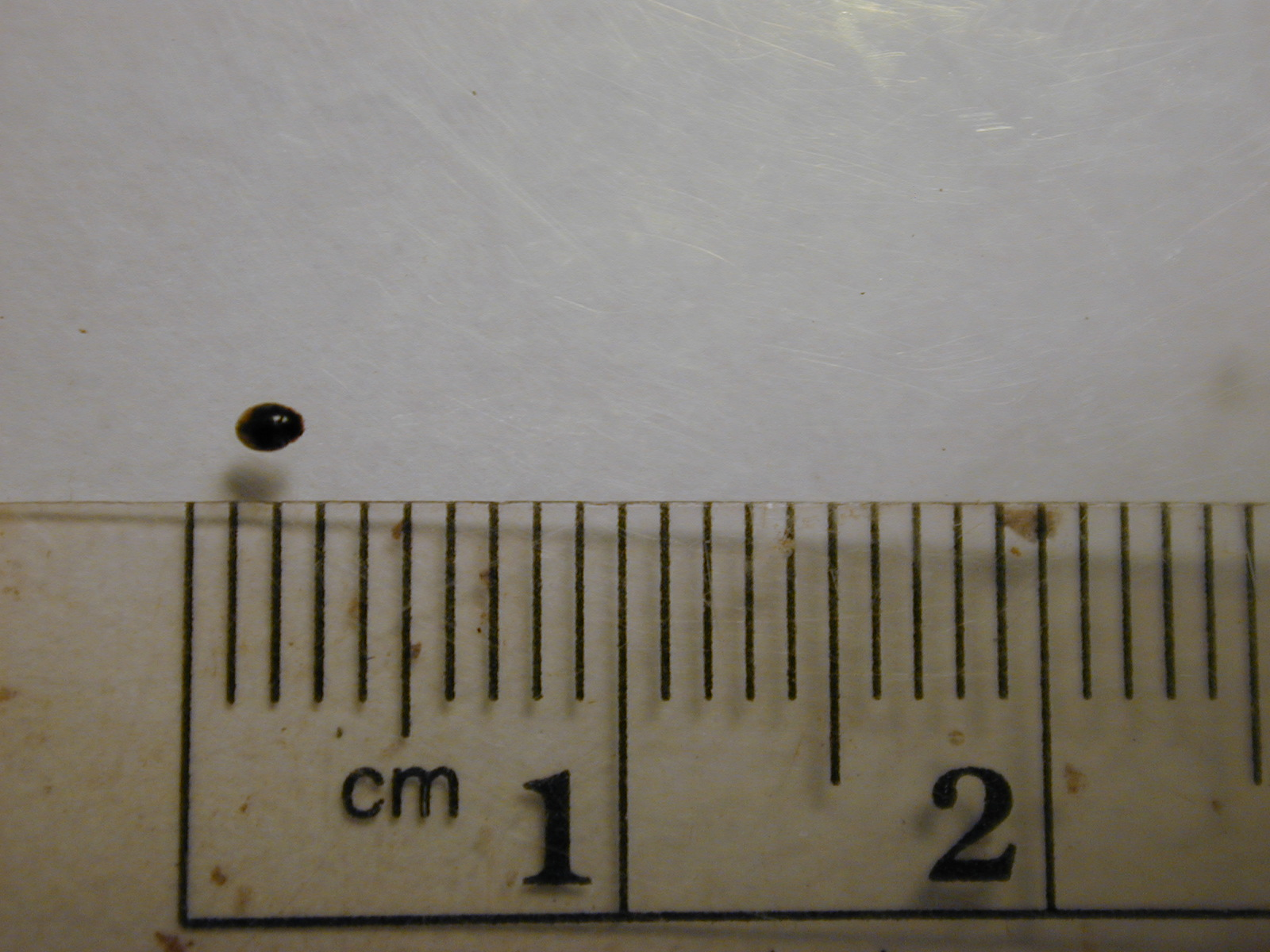
This Nephus species, like most Scymninae, is 1-2 mm long

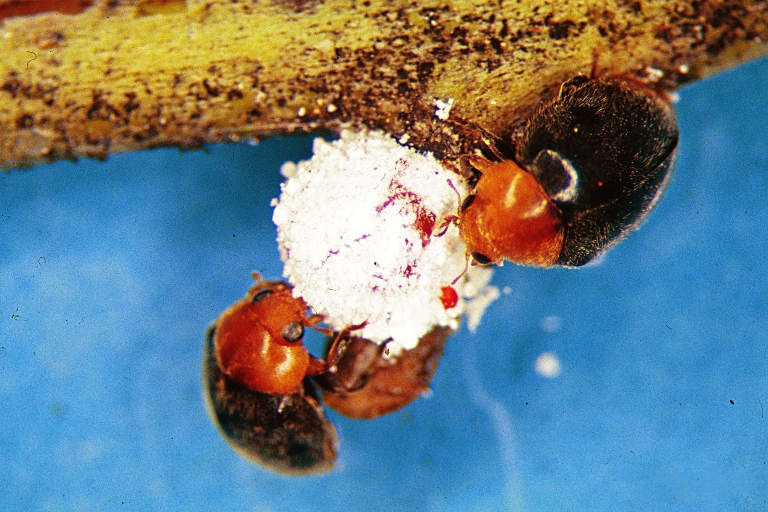
Cryptolaemus montrouzieri With aphids

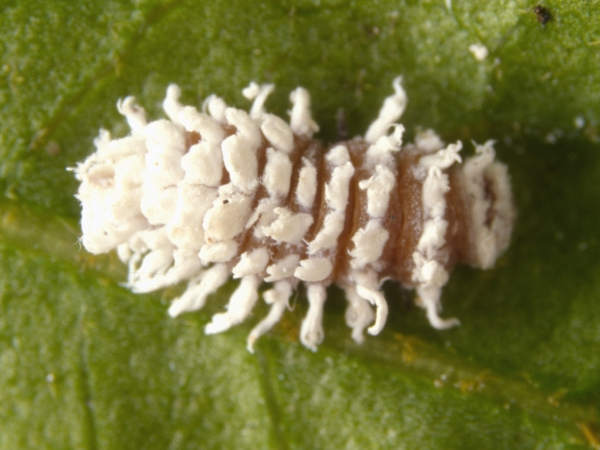
Larva of Cryptolaemus montrouzieri with wax secretions

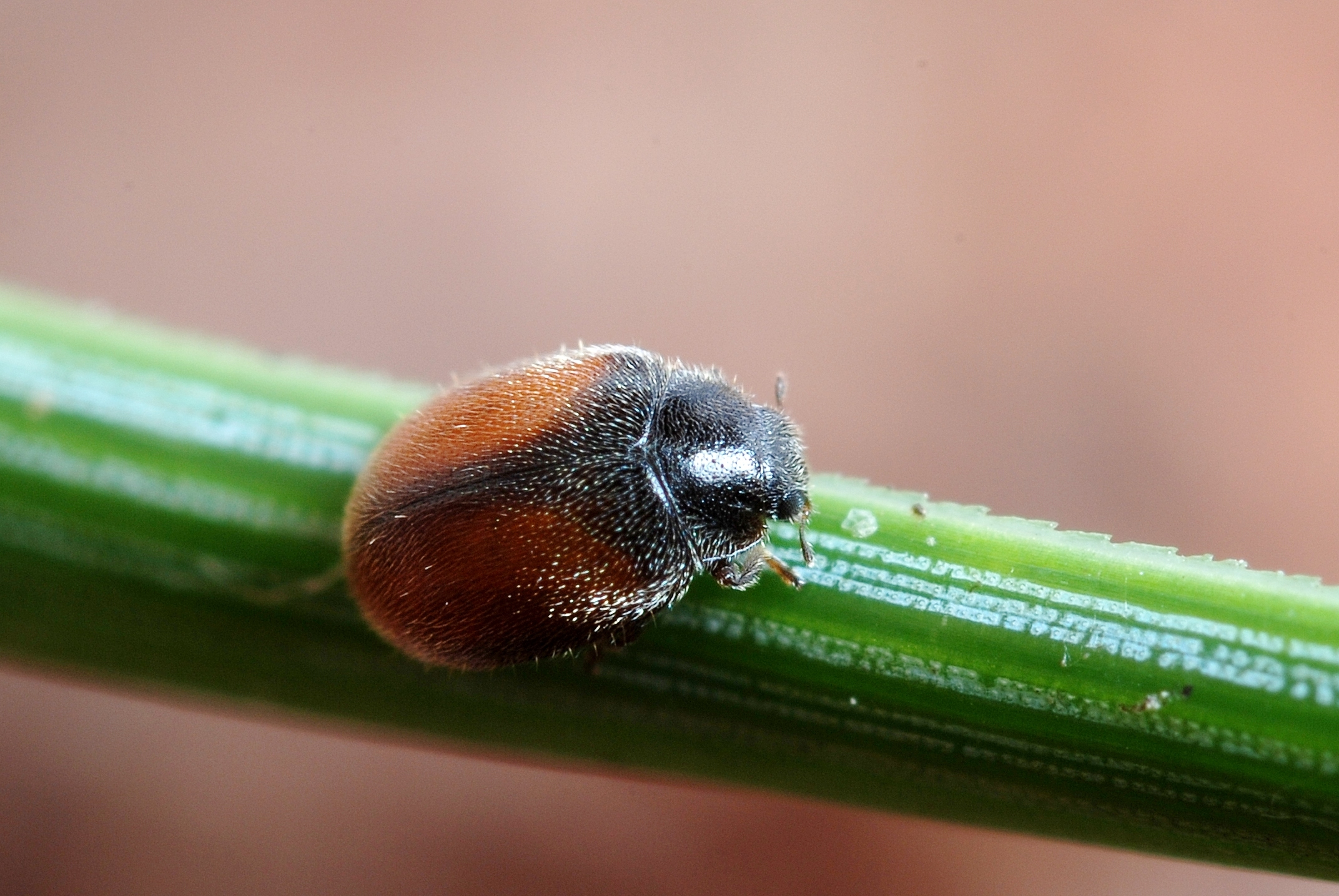
Striped dwarf pine ladybird (Scymnus suturalis)

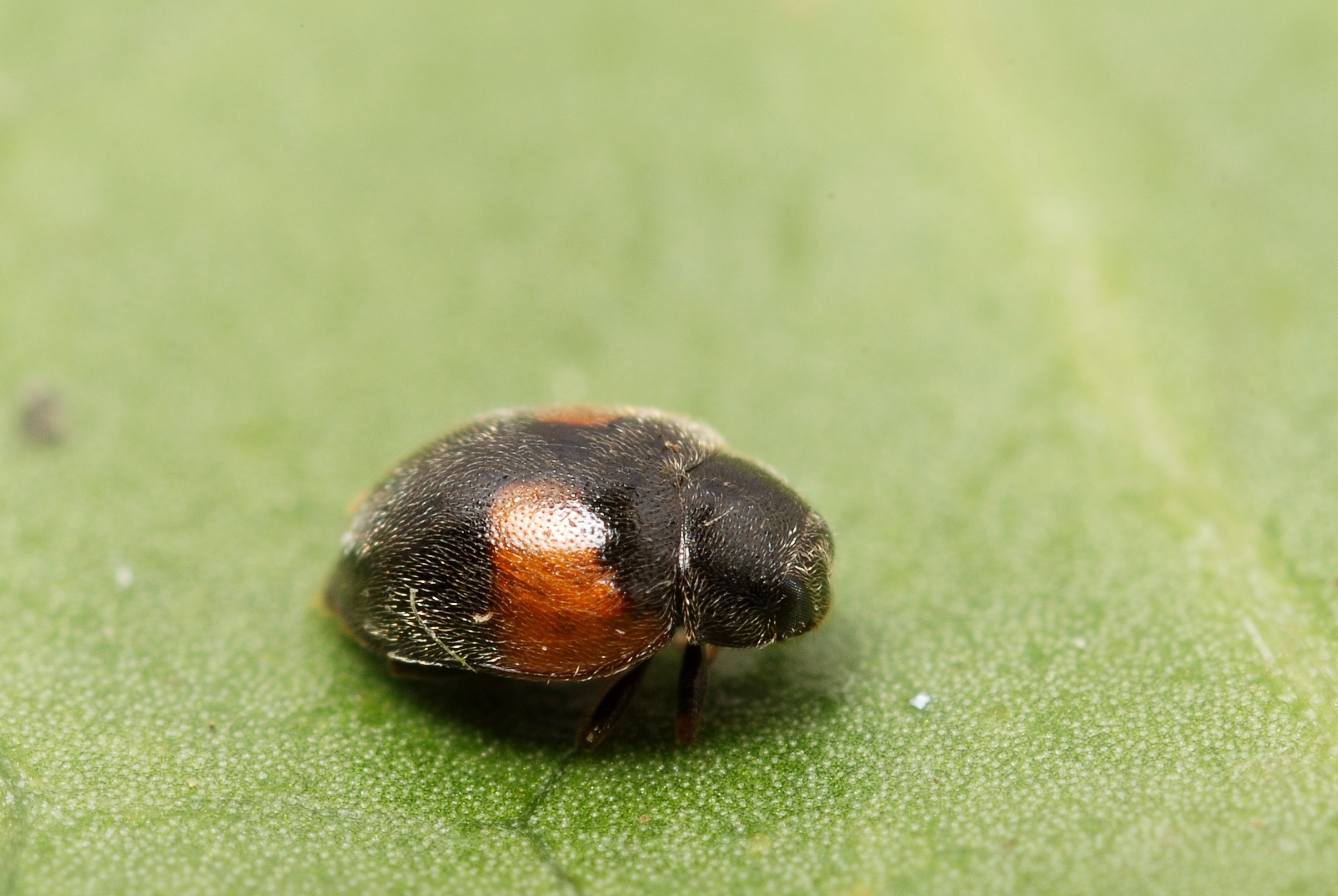
Tansy dwarf ladybug (Scymnus interruptus)

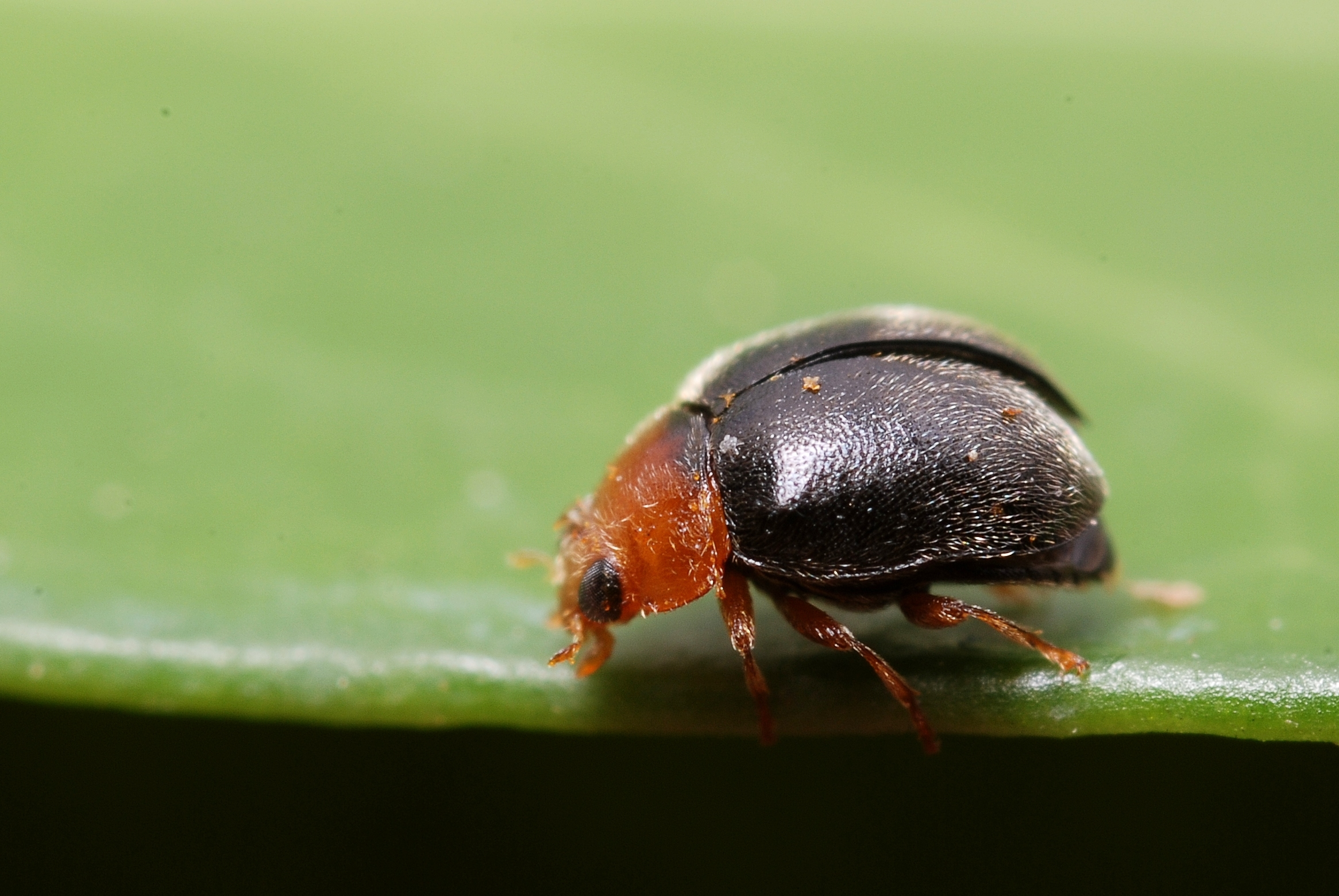
Hop dwarf ladybug (Scymnus rubromaculatus)

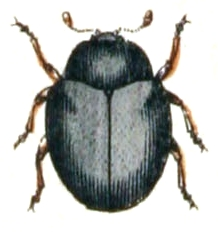
Black pine dwarf ladybug (Scymnus nigrinus)

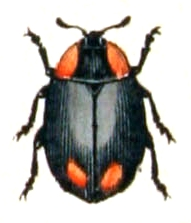
Ball ladybug (Hyperaspis reppensis)

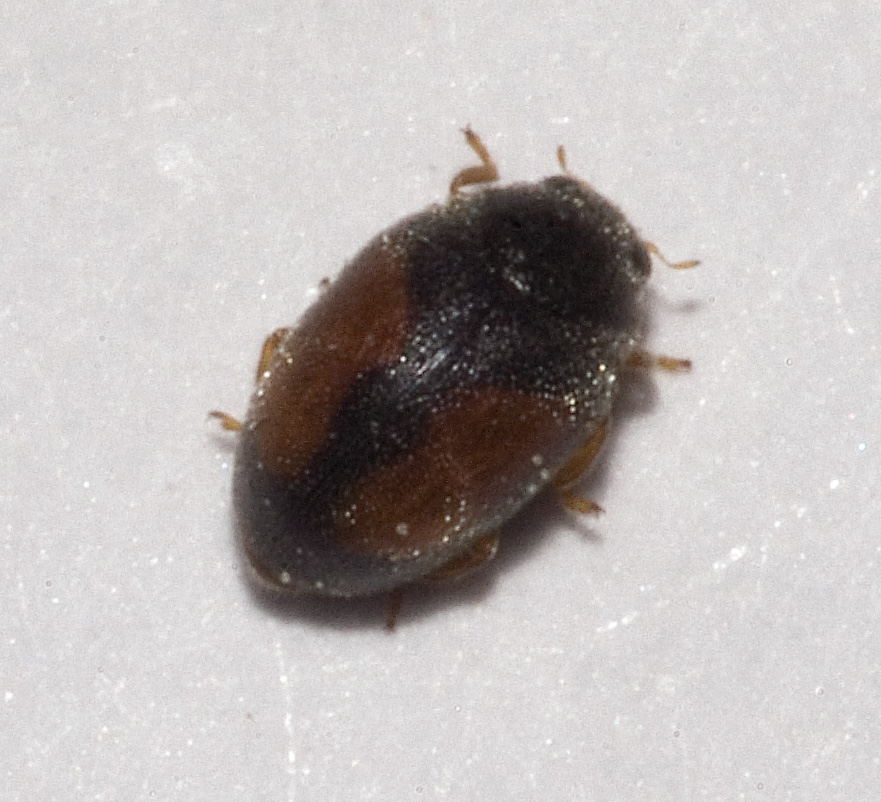
Redtenbacher dwarf ladybug (Nephus redtenbacheri)

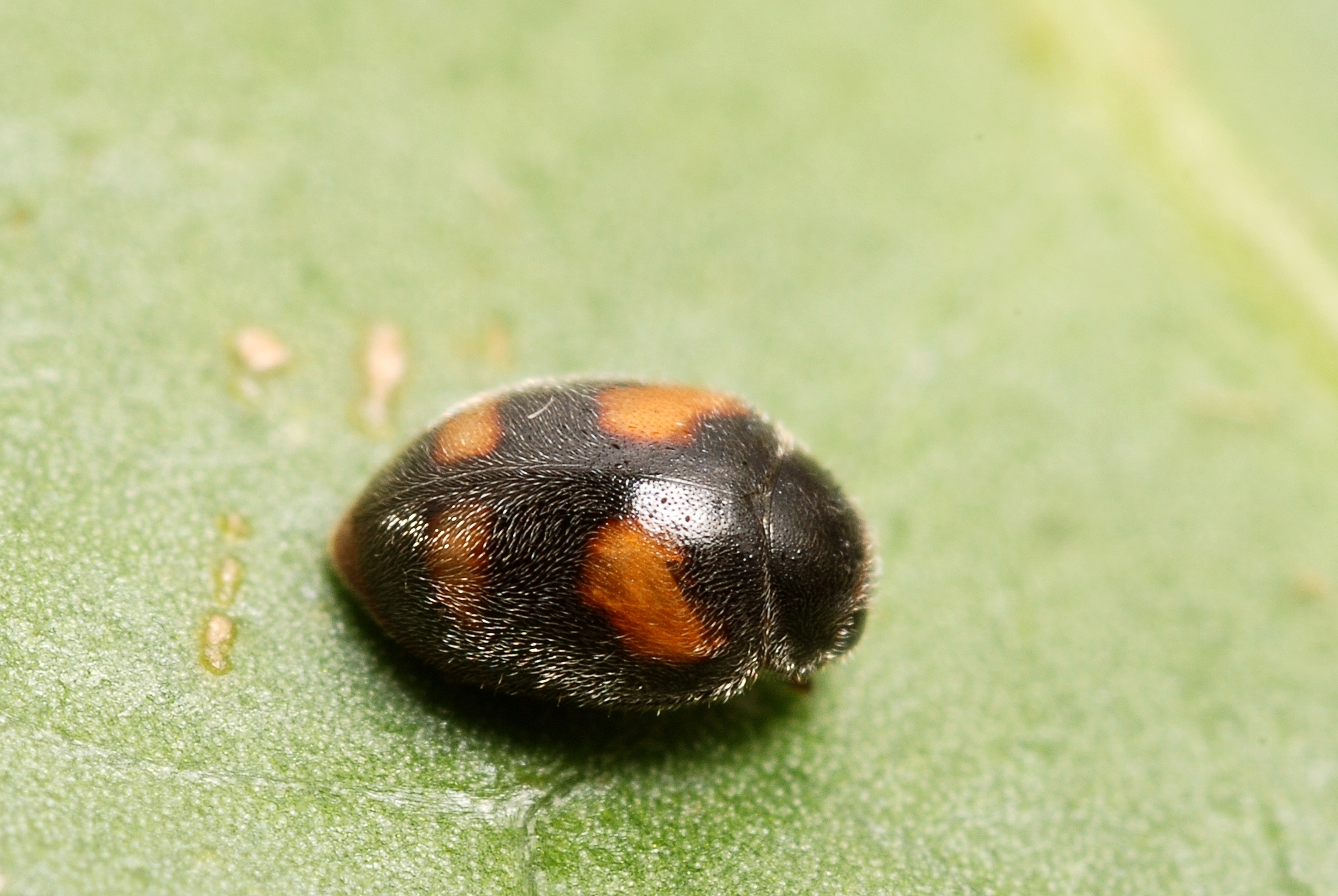
Four mottled dwarf ladybug (Nephus quadrimaculatus)

The Scymnini are a former tribe of insects within the family Coccinellidae. The tribe is now considered a synonym of Coccidulini. This group includes many small species that are commonly known as dusky ladybugs.

== Features ==
=== Adults ===
The adult beetles of Scymnini are small, typically one or two millimeters long. Their body is hemispherically domed and is almost always covered with dense hair. Only a few species have a smooth and glossy back surface. Many species can be identified by their characteristic pattern and their size, however examination under a microscope is usually needed.

The Scymnini like the Chilocorini show their head well below the prothorax (pronotum). Their very short probes are built differently and have a reduced number of members. The Chilocorini differ from the Scymnini by their greatly expanded endplates ( clypeus ).

=== Larvae ===
The larvae of Scymnini secrete a white, waxy substance, which their body is covered with. Exceptions are only seen in the species of the genus Stethorus who have no such guard formations. On the other hand, there are wax coatings also in the larvae of other tribes of ladybugs, z. B. in Coccidulini and Chilocorini. The larvae have also been known for forming small congregations of their own species, leaving a white smudge on the surface they are on.

== Life style and distribution ==
The species of the tribe Scymnini are distributed worldwide. They feed on spider mites, scale insects, Aledyrodoid moths and aphids. The beetles lay their eggs on leaves, which are infested with the lice or mites. These are not only predatory as adults but also as larvae.

== Systematics ==
The Scymnini were nomenclatured for a long time under the name Scymninae as one of numerous subfamilies of ladybugs. In 2007 was Adam Ślipiński proposed a new system, which contains only two subfamilies. Under that system, the Scymnini belong to the subfamily as Tribe Coccinellinae. The internal and external classification of Scymnini within this new subfamily needs to be investigated in more detail. Preliminary molecular studies have shown that the family is probably paraphyletic.
