= Scymnobius imitator =

Scientific classification
- Kingdom: Animalia
- Phylum: Arthropoda
- Clade: Pancrustacea
- Class: Insecta
- Order: Coleoptera
- Suborder: Polyphaga
- Infraorder: Cucujiformia
- Family: Coccinellidae
- Genus: Scymnobius
- Species: S. imitator

Binomial name
- Scymnobius imitator Gordon & González, 2002

Species of beetle

Scymnobius imitator is a species of beetle of the family Coccinellidae. It is found in Colombia.

== Description ==
Adults reach a length of about 1.8 mm. Adults are black, but the head and anterolateral angle of the pronotum, legs and apex of the elytron are yellowish red.

== Etymology ==
The species name refers to similarity to Scymnobius obscurus.
