= Scymnobius atramentarius =

Scientific classification
- Kingdom: Animalia
- Phylum: Arthropoda
- Clade: Pancrustacea
- Class: Insecta
- Order: Coleoptera
- Suborder: Polyphaga
- Infraorder: Cucujiformia
- Family: Coccinellidae
- Genus: Scymnobius
- Species: S. atramentarius

Binomial name
- Scymnobius atramentarius (Boheman, 1859)

Synonyms
- Scymnus atramentarius Boheman, 1859; Nephus atramentarius (Boheman, 1859)

Species of beetle

Scymnobius atramentarius is a species of dusky lady beetle in the family Coccinellidae. It is found in North America.
