= Stethorus siphonulus =

Scientific classification
- Kingdom: Animalia
- Phylum: Arthropoda
- Clade: Pancrustacea
- Class: Insecta
- Order: Coleoptera
- Suborder: Polyphaga
- Infraorder: Cucujiformia
- Family: Coccinellidae
- Genus: Stethorus
- Species: S. siphonulus

Binomial name
- Stethorus siphonulus Kapur, 1948

Synonyms
- Stethorus (Stethorus) aptus tsutsuii Nakane & Araki, 1959; Stethorus japonicus Kamiya, 1959

Species of beetle

Stethorus siphonulus is a species of beetle of the family Coccinellidae. It is found in Japan (Honshu, Shikoku, Kyushu, Ryukyu Islands), China (Fujian, Guangdong, Guangxi, Hainan), Malaysia and Thailand.

== Description ==
Adults reach a length of about 1.11–1.53 mm (0.044–0.060 in).
