= Scymnobius scalesius =

Scientific classification
- Kingdom: Animalia
- Phylum: Arthropoda
- Clade: Pancrustacea
- Class: Insecta
- Order: Coleoptera
- Suborder: Polyphaga
- Infraorder: Cucujiformia
- Family: Coccinellidae
- Genus: Scymnobius
- Species: S. scalesius

Binomial name
- Scymnobius scalesius Gordon & González, 2002

Species of beetle

Scymnobius scalesius is a species of beetle of the family Coccinellidae. It is found in Ecuador, including the Galapagos Islands.

== Description ==
Adults reach a length of about 1.7 mm. Adults are black with a yellow head with some brown markings. The pronotum is yellow, with a triangular dark brown spot. The elytron is black with a red spot. Also, the apical one-tenth is yellowish red.

== Etymology ==
The species is named for the Scalesia forest, where the type series was collected.
