= Nephus tagiapatus =

Scientific classification
- Kingdom: Animalia
- Phylum: Arthropoda
- Clade: Pancrustacea
- Class: Insecta
- Order: Coleoptera
- Suborder: Polyphaga
- Infraorder: Cucujiformia
- Family: Coccinellidae
- Genus: Nephus
- Species: N. tagiapatus

Binomial name
- Nephus tagiapatus (Kamiya, 1965)

Synonyms
- Scymnus (Nephus) tagiapatus Kamiya, 1965; Nephus roonwali Kapur, 1967

Species of beetle

Nephus tagiapatus is a species of beetle of the family Coccinellidae. It is found in Japan and China (Guangdong).

== Description ==
Adults reach a length of about 1.75 mm. Adults have a yellow head. The pronotum is reddish yellow, sometimes with a dark brown spot. The elytron is yellow with a dark brown sutural spot and a dark brown margin along the basal half.
