= Stethorus sichuanensis =

Scientific classification
- Kingdom: Animalia
- Phylum: Arthropoda
- Clade: Pancrustacea
- Class: Insecta
- Order: Coleoptera
- Suborder: Polyphaga
- Infraorder: Cucujiformia
- Family: Coccinellidae
- Genus: Stethorus
- Species: S. sichuanensis

Binomial name
- Stethorus sichuanensis Ren & Pang, 1996

Species of beetle

Stethorus sichuanensis is a species of beetle of the family Coccinellidae. It is found in China (Sichuan).

== Description ==
Adults reach a length of about 1.19–1.27 mm (0.047–0.050 in). They are black, except for the testaceous clypeus, antennae, mouthparts, tarsi and tibiae. The dorsal pubescence is long and greyish.
