= Scymnobius bivulnerus =

Scientific classification
- Kingdom: Animalia
- Phylum: Arthropoda
- Clade: Pancrustacea
- Class: Insecta
- Order: Coleoptera
- Suborder: Polyphaga
- Infraorder: Cucujiformia
- Family: Coccinellidae
- Genus: Scymnobius
- Species: S. bivulnerus

Binomial name
- Scymnobius bivulnerus (Horn, 1895)

Synonyms
- Scymnus bivulnerus Horn, 1895; Nephus bivulnerus (Horn, 1895)

Species of beetle

Scymnobius bivulnerus is a species of dusky lady beetle in the family Coccinellidae. It is found in North America.
