= Stethorus loi =

Scientific classification
- Kingdom: Animalia
- Phylum: Arthropoda
- Clade: Pancrustacea
- Class: Insecta
- Order: Coleoptera
- Suborder: Polyphaga
- Infraorder: Cucujiformia
- Family: Coccinellidae
- Genus: Stethorus
- Species: S. loi

Binomial name
- Stethorus loi Sasaji, 1968

Species of beetle

Stethorus loi is a species of beetle of the family Coccinellidae. It is found in Taiwan.

== Description ==
Adults reach a length of about 1.25–1.34 mm (0.049–0.053 in). The pronotum, scutellum, elytra and underside are entirely black.
