= Stethorus tridens =

Scientific classification
- Kingdom: Animalia
- Phylum: Arthropoda
- Clade: Pancrustacea
- Class: Insecta
- Order: Coleoptera
- Suborder: Polyphaga
- Infraorder: Cucujiformia
- Family: Coccinellidae
- Genus: Stethorus
- Species: S. tridens

Binomial name
- Stethorus tridens Gordon, 1982

Species of beetle

Stethorus tridens is a species of beetle of the family Coccinellidae. It is found in Honduras, Nicaragua and Colombia.

== Description ==
Adults reach a length of about 1-1.15 mm. Adults are black.

== Biology ==
It has been recorded preying on Tetranychus cinnabaru and Tetranychus urticae.
