= Stethorus muriculatus =

Scientific classification
- Kingdom: Animalia
- Phylum: Arthropoda
- Clade: Pancrustacea
- Class: Insecta
- Order: Coleoptera
- Suborder: Polyphaga
- Infraorder: Cucujiformia
- Family: Coccinellidae
- Genus: Stethorus
- Species: S. muriculatus

Binomial name
- Stethorus muriculatus Yu, 1995

Species of beetle

Stethorus muriculatus is a species of beetle of the family Coccinellidae. It is found in Taiwan.

== Description ==
Adults reach a length of about 1.32–1.52 mm (0.052–0.060 in). They are black, but the eyes, mouthparts, antennae, tibiae and tarsi are dark brown.
