= Stethorus pinachi =

Scientific classification
- Kingdom: Animalia
- Phylum: Arthropoda
- Clade: Pancrustacea
- Class: Insecta
- Order: Coleoptera
- Suborder: Polyphaga
- Infraorder: Cucujiformia
- Family: Coccinellidae
- Genus: Stethorus
- Species: S. pinachi

Binomial name
- Stethorus pinachi Gordon & Chapin, 1983

Species of beetle

Stethorus pinachi is a species of beetle of the family Coccinellidae. It is found in North America, where it has been recorded from Texas and Mexico.

== Description ==
Adults reach a length of about 1.25–1.40 mm. They have a black body, while the antennae, mouthparts and legs are yellow.
