= Nephus georgei =

Scientific classification
- Kingdom: Animalia
- Phylum: Arthropoda
- Clade: Pancrustacea
- Class: Insecta
- Order: Coleoptera
- Suborder: Polyphaga
- Infraorder: Cucujiformia
- Family: Coccinellidae
- Genus: Nephus
- Species: N. georgei

Binomial name
- Nephus georgei (Weise, 1929)

Species of beetle

Nephus georgei, known generally as the George's lady beetle or Farmer's lady beetle, is a species of dusky lady beetle in the family Coccinellidae. It is found in North America.
