= Stethorus yingjiangensis =

Scientific classification
- Kingdom: Animalia
- Phylum: Arthropoda
- Clade: Pancrustacea
- Class: Insecta
- Order: Coleoptera
- Suborder: Polyphaga
- Infraorder: Cucujiformia
- Family: Coccinellidae
- Genus: Stethorus
- Species: S. yingjiangensis

Binomial name
- Stethorus yingjiangensis Cao & Xiao, 1984

Species of beetle

Stethorus yingjiangensis is a species of beetle of the family Coccinellidae. It is found in China (Yunnan, Guizhou).
