= Nephus ornatus =

Scientific classification
- Kingdom: Animalia
- Phylum: Arthropoda
- Clade: Pancrustacea
- Class: Insecta
- Order: Coleoptera
- Suborder: Polyphaga
- Infraorder: Cucujiformia
- Family: Coccinellidae
- Genus: Nephus
- Species: N. ornatus

Binomial name
- Nephus ornatus (LeConte, 1850)

Species of beetle

Nephus ornatus, the ornate lady beetle, is a species of dusky lady beetle in the family Coccinellidae. It is found in North America.

== Subspecies ==
- Nephus ornatus naviculatus (Casey, 1899)
- Nephus ornatus ornatus (LeConte, 1850)
