= Stethorus cribripennis =

Scientific classification
- Kingdom: Animalia
- Phylum: Arthropoda
- Clade: Pancrustacea
- Class: Insecta
- Order: Coleoptera
- Suborder: Polyphaga
- Infraorder: Cucujiformia
- Family: Coccinellidae
- Genus: Stethorus
- Species: S. cribripennis

Binomial name
- Stethorus cribripennis (Champion, 1913)

Synonyms
- Scymnus cribripennis Champion, 1913

Species of beetle

Stethorus cribripennis is a species of beetle of the family Coccinellidae. It is found from southern Mexico to Colombia.

== Description ==
Adults reach a length of about 1-1.40 mm. Adults are black with reddish yellow antennae and legs.
