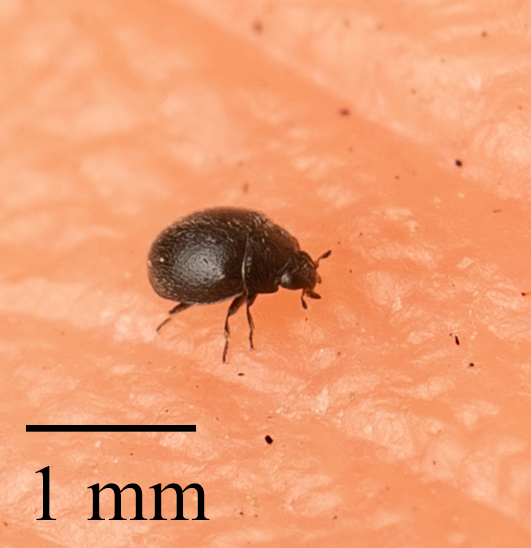

Scientific classification
- Kingdom: Animalia
- Phylum: Arthropoda
- Clade: Pancrustacea
- Class: Insecta
- Order: Coleoptera
- Suborder: Polyphaga
- Infraorder: Cucujiformia
- Family: Coccinellidae
- Genus: Stethorus
- Species: S. punctum

Binomial name
- Stethorus punctum (LeConte, 1852)

Synonyms
- Scymnus punctum LeConte, 1852; Stethorus brevis Casey, 1899; Stethorus picipes Casey, 1899

= Stethorus punctum =

Species of beetle

Stethorus punctum, known generally as the spider mite destroyer or black mite destroyer, is a species of lady beetle in the family Coccinellidae. It is found in North America.

== Description ==
Adults reach a length of about 1.35-1.55 mm. They have a black body, while the antennae, mouthparts and legs are yellow. In subspecies picipes, the legs are black or dark brown.

== Biology ==
Stethorus punctum is strictly a predator of plant-feeding mites, particularly the spider mites such as the European red mite and the two-spotted spider mite, and especially the eggs.

== Subspecies ==
These two subspecies belong to the species Stethorus punctum:

- Stethorus punctum picipes Casey, 1899 (Idaho to British Columbia, south to southern California)
- Stethorus punctum punctum (LeConte, 1852) (southeastern Canada to North Carolina, west to Montana and Colorado)
