= Stethorus caseyi =

Scientific classification
- Kingdom: Animalia
- Phylum: Arthropoda
- Clade: Pancrustacea
- Class: Insecta
- Order: Coleoptera
- Suborder: Polyphaga
- Infraorder: Cucujiformia
- Family: Coccinellidae
- Genus: Stethorus
- Species: S. caseyi

Binomial name
- Stethorus caseyi Gordon & Chapin, 1983

Species of beetle

Stethorus caseyi is a species of beetle of the family Coccinellidae. It is found in North America, where it has been recorded from Arizona, New Mexico, Texas and Utah.

== Description ==
Adults reach a length of about 1.10–1.31 mm. They have a black body, while the antennae, mouthparts and legs are yellow.
