= Stethorus grossepunctatus =

Scientific classification
- Kingdom: Animalia
- Phylum: Arthropoda
- Clade: Pancrustacea
- Class: Insecta
- Order: Coleoptera
- Suborder: Polyphaga
- Infraorder: Cucujiformia
- Family: Coccinellidae
- Genus: Stethorus
- Species: S. grossepunctatus

Binomial name
- Stethorus grossepunctatus Gordon & Chapin, 1983

Species of beetle

Stethorus grossepunctatus is a species of beetle of the family Coccinellidae. It is found in Brazil.

== Description ==
Adults reach a length of about 1.10 mm. Adults are black with yellow antennae and legs and with large dorsal and ventral punctures.
