= Stethorus parapauperculus =

Scientific classification
- Kingdom: Animalia
- Phylum: Arthropoda
- Clade: Pancrustacea
- Class: Insecta
- Order: Coleoptera
- Suborder: Polyphaga
- Infraorder: Cucujiformia
- Family: Coccinellidae
- Genus: Stethorus
- Species: S. parapauperculus

Binomial name
- Stethorus parapauperculus Pang, 1966

Species of beetle

Stethorus parapauperculus is a species of beetle of the family Coccinellidae. It is found in Japan (Ryukyu Islands) and China (Fujian, Guangdong, Guangxi, Hainan, Yunnan).

== Description ==
Adults reach a length of about 0.94–1.18 mm (0.037–0.046 in).
