= Stethorus takakoae =

Scientific classification
- Kingdom: Animalia
- Phylum: Arthropoda
- Clade: Pancrustacea
- Class: Insecta
- Order: Coleoptera
- Suborder: Polyphaga
- Infraorder: Cucujiformia
- Family: Coccinellidae
- Genus: Stethorus
- Species: S. takakoae

Binomial name
- Stethorus takakoae Seki & Maruyama, 2025

Species of beetle

Stethorus takakoae is a species of beetle of the family Coccinellidae. It is found in Japan (Hokkaido).

== Description ==
Adults reach a length of about 1.32–1.45 mm (0.052–0.057 in). They have an elongate oval body, which is densely covered with white setae. The dorsal and ventral surfaces are entirely black, except for the yellow antennae, testaceous mouthparts and the yellowish brown posterior half of the frons.

== Etymology ==
The species is dedicated to the first author's grandmother, Mrs. Takako Ōtsuki.
