= Stethorus granum =

Scientific classification
- Kingdom: Animalia
- Phylum: Arthropoda
- Clade: Pancrustacea
- Class: Insecta
- Order: Coleoptera
- Suborder: Polyphaga
- Infraorder: Cucujiformia
- Family: Coccinellidae
- Genus: Stethorus
- Species: S. granum

Binomial name
- Stethorus granum (Gorham, 1897)

Synonyms
- Scymnus granum Gorham, 1897; Stethorus guatemalensis Hall & Fleschner, 1958

Species of beetle

Stethorus granum is a species of beetle of the family Coccinellidae. It is found in Guatemala to Costa Rica.

== Description ==
Adults reach a length of about 1.25–1.35 mm. Adults are black with yellow antennae and legs.
