= Stethorus darwini =

Scientific classification
- Kingdom: Animalia
- Phylum: Arthropoda
- Clade: Pancrustacea
- Class: Insecta
- Order: Coleoptera
- Suborder: Polyphaga
- Infraorder: Cucujiformia
- Family: Coccinellidae
- Genus: Stethorus
- Species: S. darwini

Binomial name
- Stethorus darwini (Brèthes, 1925)

Synonyms
- Nephopullus darwini Brèthes, 1925; Stethorus ogloblini Nunenmacher, 1937

Species of beetle

Stethorus darwini is a species of beetle of the family Coccinellidae. It is found in Uruguay and Argentina.

== Description ==
Adults reach a length of about 1.65 mm. Adults are black with yellow antennae and legs.
