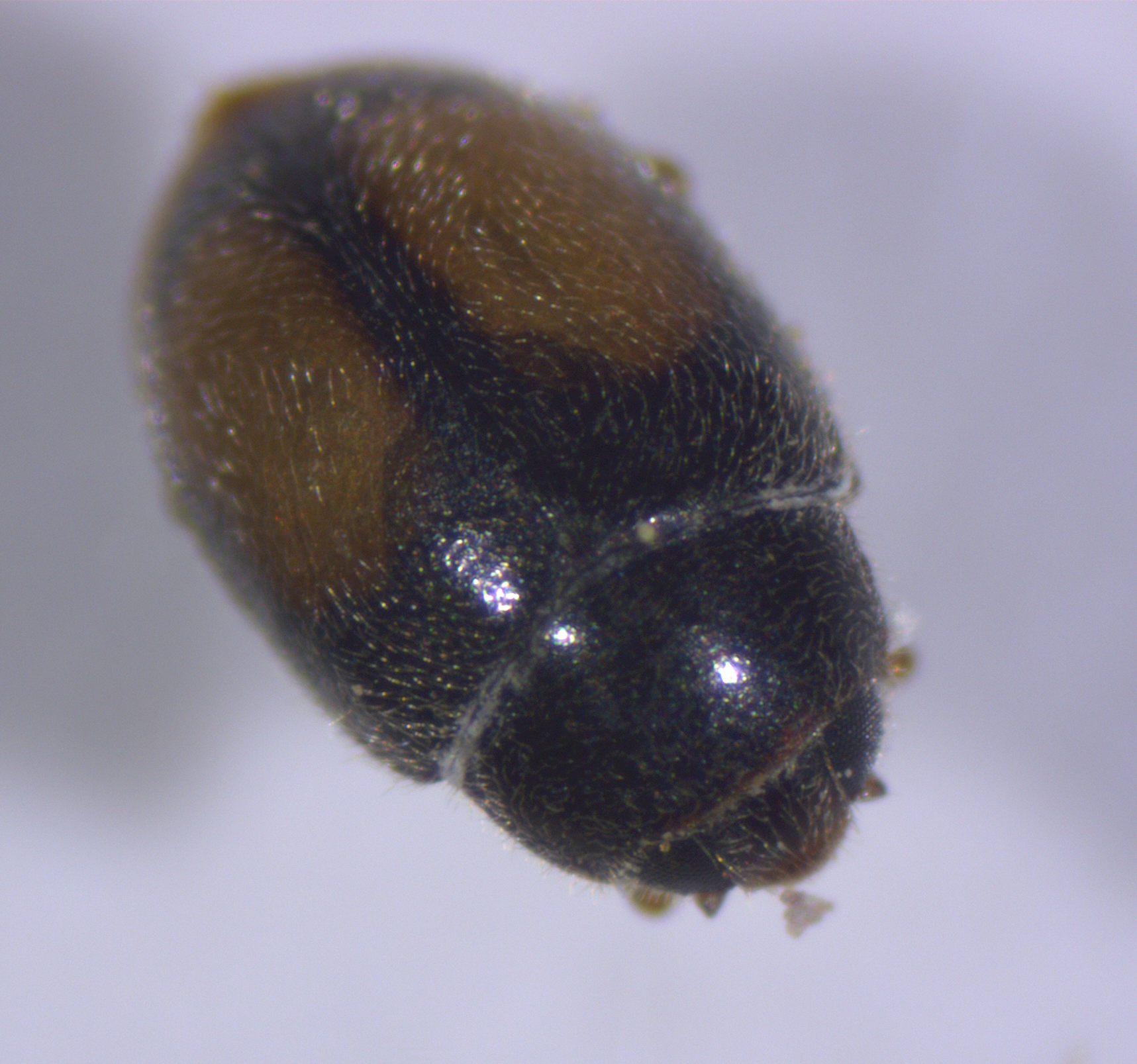

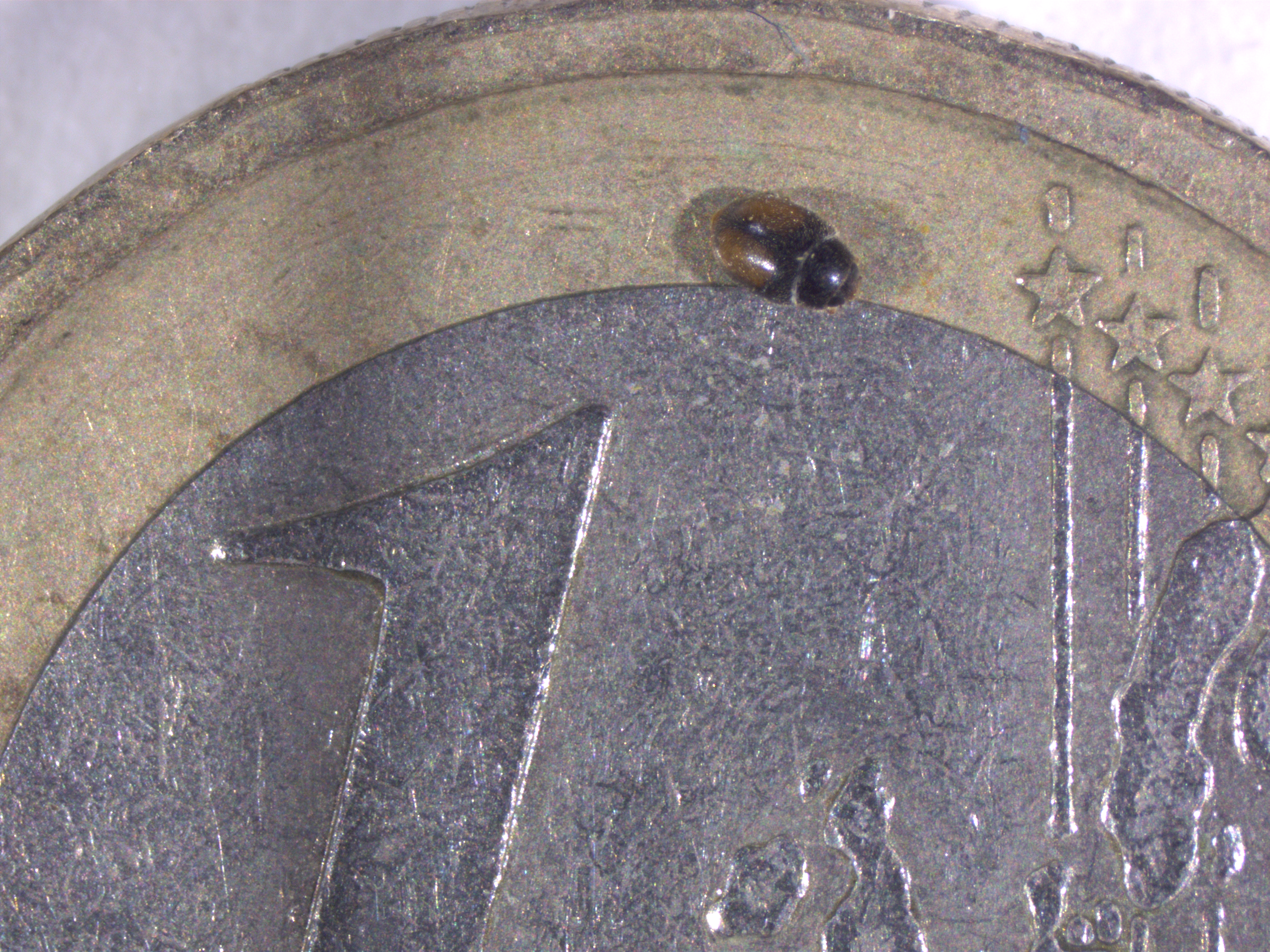
- Nephus voeltzkowi on a 1 euro coin

Scientific classification
- Kingdom: Animalia
- Phylum: Arthropoda
- Clade: Pancrustacea
- Class: Insecta
- Order: Coleoptera
- Suborder: Polyphaga
- Infraorder: Cucujiformia
- Family: Coccinellidae
- Genus: Nephus
- Species: N. voeltzkowi

Binomial name
- Nephus voeltzkowi Weise, 1910

Synonyms
- Scymnus (Nephus) voeltzkowi (Weise, 1910); Nephus seychellensis Sicard, 1912; Nephus alyssae Golia & Golia, 2014

= Nephus voeltzkowi =

Species of beetle

Nephus (Nephus) voeltzkowi is a species of ladybug belonging to the family Coccinellidae naturally occurring in Sub-Saharan Africa, Mascarene archipelagos, and the Azores islands, but also found in the United States (Florida). This species exhibits the first case of parthenogenesis in ladybugs.

== Description ==
Nephus voeltzkowi can reach a length of 1.65 millimetres (0.065 in) and feeds on mealybugs. Elytra are black, each with one yellowish big oval spot. The body is oval-shaped with short fine whitish pubescence.

== Parthenogenesis ==
Most known populations of Nephus voeltzkowi are bisexual, but several female-only populations were found capable of parthenogenesis.
