= Scymnobius bilucernarius =

Scientific classification
- Kingdom: Animalia
- Phylum: Arthropoda
- Clade: Pancrustacea
- Class: Insecta
- Order: Coleoptera
- Suborder: Polyphaga
- Infraorder: Cucujiformia
- Family: Coccinellidae
- Genus: Scymnobius
- Species: S. bilucernarius

Binomial name
- Scymnobius bilucernarius (Mulsant, 1850)

Synonyms
- Scymnus bilucernarius Mulsant, 1850; Scymnus pictus Gorham, 1899

Species of beetle

Scymnobius bilucernarius is a species of beetle of the family Coccinellidae. It is found from Mexico and the Lesser Antilles south to Venezuela and Colombia.

== Description ==
Adults reach a length of about 1.4–2.1 mm. Adults are black. The lateral one-fourth of the pronotum is reddish yellow and the elytron has a yellow spot.
