= Scymnobius triangularis =

Scientific classification
- Kingdom: Animalia
- Phylum: Arthropoda
- Clade: Pancrustacea
- Class: Insecta
- Order: Coleoptera
- Suborder: Polyphaga
- Infraorder: Cucujiformia
- Family: Coccinellidae
- Genus: Scymnobius
- Species: S. triangularis

Binomial name
- Scymnobius triangularis Gordon & González, 2002

Species of beetle

Scymnobius triangularis is a species of beetle of the family Coccinellidae. It is found in Chile.

== Description ==
Adults reach a length of about 1.5–1.8 mm. Adults are brownish yellow, while the median one-third of the pronotum is brown to dark brown. The basal one-fourth of the elytron is brown and there is a dark brown spot.

== Etymology ==
The species name refers to the triangular form of the basal lobe in the male genitalia.
