= Scymnobius galapagoensis =

Scientific classification
- Kingdom: Animalia
- Phylum: Arthropoda
- Clade: Pancrustacea
- Class: Insecta
- Order: Coleoptera
- Suborder: Polyphaga
- Infraorder: Cucujiformia
- Family: Coccinellidae
- Genus: Scymnobius
- Species: S. galapagoensis

Binomial name
- Scymnobius galapagoensis (Waterhouse, 1845)

Synonyms
- Scymnus galapagoensis Waterhouse, 1845; Scymnus ocellatus Sharp, 1885

Species of beetle

Scymnobius galapagoensis is a species of beetle of the family Coccinellidae. It is found on the Galapagos Islands, as well as in Polynesia and on Hawaii.

== Description ==
Adults reach a length of about 1.4–1.8 mm. Adults are yellow, the elytron with a dark brown basal marking in the form of a triangle and some other small brown spots.
