= Scymnobius rotundus =

Scientific classification
- Kingdom: Animalia
- Phylum: Arthropoda
- Clade: Pancrustacea
- Class: Insecta
- Order: Coleoptera
- Suborder: Polyphaga
- Infraorder: Cucujiformia
- Family: Coccinellidae
- Genus: Scymnobius
- Species: S. rotundus

Binomial name
- Scymnobius rotundus Gordon & González, 2002

Species of beetle

Scymnobius rotundus is a species of beetle of the family Coccinellidae. It is found in Colombia.

== Description ==
Adults reach a length of about 1.5–1.8 mm. Adults are reddish yellow. The elytron is dark brown, with the apical one-tenth reddish yellow.

== Etymology ==
The species name refers to the rounded form of the body.
