= Scymnobius aricaensis =

Scientific classification
- Kingdom: Animalia
- Phylum: Arthropoda
- Clade: Pancrustacea
- Class: Insecta
- Order: Coleoptera
- Suborder: Polyphaga
- Infraorder: Cucujiformia
- Family: Coccinellidae
- Genus: Scymnobius
- Species: S. aricaensis

Binomial name
- Scymnobius aricaensis Gordon & González, 2002

Species of beetle

Scymnobius aricaensis is a species of beetle of the family Coccinellidae. It is found in Chile.

== Description ==
Adults reach a length of about 1.6–2 mm. Adults are reddish yellow, while the pronotum has a reddish brown basomedial area. The elytron is brown, while the apical one-third is paler reddish brown.

== Etymology ==
The species is named for the region of Arica in Chile, where the type specimen was found.
