= Stethorus longisiphonulus =

Scientific classification
- Kingdom: Animalia
- Phylum: Arthropoda
- Clade: Pancrustacea
- Class: Insecta
- Order: Coleoptera
- Suborder: Polyphaga
- Infraorder: Cucujiformia
- Family: Coccinellidae
- Genus: Stethorus
- Species: S. longisiphonulus

Binomial name
- Stethorus longisiphonulus Pang, 1966

Species of beetle

Stethorus longisiphonulus is a species of beetle of the family Coccinellidae. It is found in China (Hainan, Guangdong) and Vietnam.
