= Stethorus rani =

Scientific classification
- Kingdom: Animalia
- Phylum: Arthropoda
- Clade: Pancrustacea
- Class: Insecta
- Order: Coleoptera
- Suborder: Polyphaga
- Infraorder: Cucujiformia
- Family: Coccinellidae
- Genus: Stethorus
- Species: S. rani

Binomial name
- Stethorus rani Kapur, 1948

Species of beetle

Stethorus rani is a species of beetle of the family Coccinellidae. It is found in China (Guangdong, Fujian), India and Thailand.
