= Stethorus klapperichi =

Scientific classification
- Kingdom: Animalia
- Phylum: Arthropoda
- Clade: Pancrustacea
- Class: Insecta
- Order: Coleoptera
- Suborder: Polyphaga
- Infraorder: Cucujiformia
- Family: Coccinellidae
- Genus: Stethorus
- Species: S. klapperichi

Binomial name
- Stethorus klapperichi Yu, 1995

Species of beetle

Stethorus klapperichi is a species of beetle of the family Coccinellidae. It is found in Taiwan.

== Description ==
Adults reach a length of about 1.35–1.47 mm (0.053–0.058 in). They are black, but the eyes, antennae, mouthparts and legs are brown.
