= Stethorus albipes =

Scientific classification
- Kingdom: Animalia
- Phylum: Arthropoda
- Clade: Pancrustacea
- Class: Insecta
- Order: Coleoptera
- Suborder: Polyphaga
- Infraorder: Cucujiformia
- Family: Coccinellidae
- Genus: Stethorus
- Species: S. albipes

Binomial name
- Stethorus albipes (Mulsant, 1850)

Synonyms
- Scymnus albipes Mulsant, 1850; Stethorus caribus Gordon & Chapin, 1983

Species of beetle

Stethorus albipes is a species of beetle of the family Coccinellidae. It is found on various Caribbean islands, including the Dominican Republic, Antigua, St. Eustatius, Cuba, Haiti and Puerto Rico.

== Description ==
Adults reach a length of about 0.95-1.12 mm. Adults are black with yellow legs.
