= Scymnobius quadrarius =

Scientific classification
- Kingdom: Animalia
- Phylum: Arthropoda
- Clade: Pancrustacea
- Class: Insecta
- Order: Coleoptera
- Suborder: Polyphaga
- Infraorder: Cucujiformia
- Family: Coccinellidae
- Genus: Scymnobius
- Species: S. quadrarius

Binomial name
- Scymnobius quadrarius (Casey, 1924)

Synonyms
- Scymnus quadrarius Casey, 1924; Nephus quadrarius (Casey, 1924)

Species of beetle

Scymnobius quadrarius is a species of dusky lady beetle in the family Coccinellidae. It is found in North America.
