= Stethorus peruvianus =

Scientific classification
- Kingdom: Animalia
- Phylum: Arthropoda
- Clade: Pancrustacea
- Class: Insecta
- Order: Coleoptera
- Suborder: Polyphaga
- Infraorder: Cucujiformia
- Family: Coccinellidae
- Genus: Stethorus
- Species: S. peruvianus

Binomial name
- Stethorus peruvianus Gonzalez, Gordon & Robinson, 2008

Species of beetle

Stethorus peruvianus is a species of beetle in the family Coccinellidae. It is found in Peru.

== Description ==
Adults reach a length of about 1.20-1.40 mm. Adults are black, while the antennae and legs are yellow. The body is covered with yellowish white hairs.
