= Stethorus micellus =

Scientific classification
- Kingdom: Animalia
- Phylum: Arthropoda
- Clade: Pancrustacea
- Class: Insecta
- Order: Coleoptera
- Suborder: Polyphaga
- Infraorder: Cucujiformia
- Family: Coccinellidae
- Genus: Stethorus
- Species: S. micellus

Binomial name
- Stethorus micellus Gordon & Chapin, 1983

Species of beetle

Stethorus micellus is a species of beetle of the family Coccinellidae. It is found in Colombia.

== Description ==
Adults reach a length of about 1.28 mm. Adults are black with reddish yellow antennae and legs.
