= Scymnobius timberlakei =

Scientific classification
- Kingdom: Animalia
- Phylum: Arthropoda
- Clade: Pancrustacea
- Class: Insecta
- Order: Coleoptera
- Suborder: Polyphaga
- Infraorder: Cucujiformia
- Family: Coccinellidae
- Genus: Scymnobius
- Species: S. timberlakei

Binomial name
- Scymnobius timberlakei (Gordon, 1985)

Synonyms
- Nephus timberlakei Gordon, 1985

Species of beetle

Scymnobius timberlakei is a species of dusky lady beetle in the family Coccinellidae. It is found in North America, where it has been recorded from Texas.

== Description ==
Adults reach a length of about 1.66–2 mm. They have a brownish red body. The basal half of the elytron is dark brown.

== Etymology ==
The species is named for P. H. Timberlake who first identified it as an undescribed species.
