= Stethorus hirashimai =

Scientific classification
- Kingdom: Animalia
- Phylum: Arthropoda
- Clade: Pancrustacea
- Class: Insecta
- Order: Coleoptera
- Suborder: Polyphaga
- Infraorder: Cucujiformia
- Family: Coccinellidae
- Genus: Stethorus
- Species: S. hirashimai

Binomial name
- Stethorus hirashimai Sasaji, 1968

Species of beetle

Stethorus hirashimai is a species of beetle of the family Coccinellidae. It is found in Taiwan.

== Description ==
Adults reach a length of about 1–1.17 mm (0.039–0.046 in). The head is black, with pale yellowish brown antennae. The dorsal and ventral surfaces are entirely black.
