= Stethorus murilloi =

Scientific classification
- Kingdom: Animalia
- Phylum: Arthropoda
- Clade: Pancrustacea
- Class: Insecta
- Order: Coleoptera
- Suborder: Polyphaga
- Infraorder: Cucujiformia
- Family: Coccinellidae
- Genus: Stethorus
- Species: S. murilloi

Binomial name
- Stethorus murilloi Gordon, 1982

Species of beetle

Stethorus murilloi is a species of beetle of the family Coccinellidae. It is found in Colombia.

== Description ==
Adults reach a length of about 1.10–1.25 mm. Adults are black, while the antennae are yellow.
