= Scymnobius caliginosus =

Scientific classification
- Kingdom: Animalia
- Phylum: Arthropoda
- Clade: Pancrustacea
- Class: Insecta
- Order: Coleoptera
- Suborder: Polyphaga
- Infraorder: Cucujiformia
- Family: Coccinellidae
- Genus: Scymnobius
- Species: S. caliginosus

Binomial name
- Scymnobius caliginosus Gordon & González, 2002

Species of beetle

Scymnobius caliginosus is a species of beetle of the family Coccinellidae. It is found in Brazil.

== Description ==
Adults reach a length of about 1.6–2 mm. Adults are black with a yellow head. The pronotum is also yellow, but with a large black spot.

== Etymology ==
The species named is derived from Latin caligo (meaning darkness or dark) and refers to the mostly black dorsum of the species.
