= Stethorus yezoensis =

Scientific classification
- Kingdom: Animalia
- Phylum: Arthropoda
- Clade: Pancrustacea
- Class: Insecta
- Order: Coleoptera
- Suborder: Polyphaga
- Infraorder: Cucujiformia
- Family: Coccinellidae
- Genus: Stethorus
- Species: S. yezoensis

Binomial name
- Stethorus yezoensis Miyatake, 1966

Species of beetle

Stethorus yezoensis is a species of beetle of the family Coccinellidae. It is found in Japan (Hokkaido, Honshu) and on the Kuril Islands.

== Description ==
Adults reach a length of about 1.47–1.5 mm (0.058–0.059 in).
