= Stethorus vietnamicus =

Scientific classification
- Kingdom: Animalia
- Phylum: Arthropoda
- Clade: Pancrustacea
- Class: Insecta
- Order: Coleoptera
- Suborder: Polyphaga
- Infraorder: Cucujiformia
- Family: Coccinellidae
- Genus: Stethorus
- Species: S. vietnamicus

Binomial name
- Stethorus vietnamicus Hoang, 1979

Species of beetle

Stethorus vietnamicus is a species of beetle of the family Coccinellidae. It is found in China (Hainan, Guangxi) and Vietnam.
