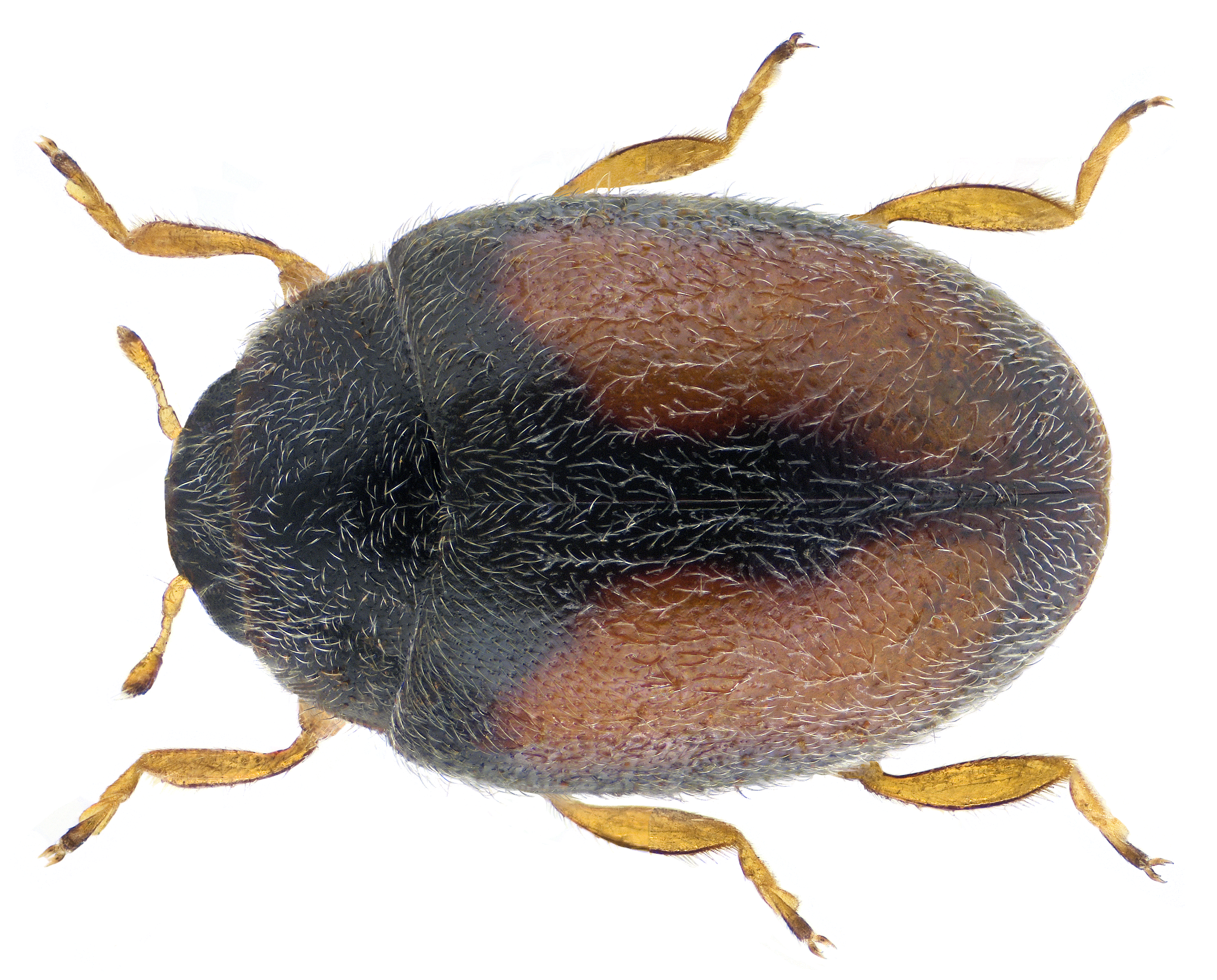
- Dorsal perspective of adult

Scientific classification
- Kingdom: Animalia
- Phylum: Arthropoda
- Clade: Pancrustacea
- Class: Insecta
- Order: Coleoptera
- Suborder: Polyphaga
- Infraorder: Cucujiformia
- Family: Coccinellidae
- Genus: Nephus
- Species: N. redtenbacheri

Binomial name
- Nephus redtenbacheri Mulsant, 1846

= Nephus redtenbacheri =

Species of beetle

Nephus redtenbacheri is a species of beetle in family Coccinellidae. It is found in the Palearctic (Europe, North Africa, European Russia, Ciscaucasia, Siberia, the Russian Far East, Belarus, Ukraine, Moldova and Western Asia.

== Ecology ==
In central Europe this beetle lives in the grass layer and detritus, feeding on scale insects, aphids, and especially Psocoptera. It occurs in marshes, including peatbogs, on marshy shores, in meadows, at wet forest edges, in flood-plain forests, and in dry habitats such as karst, sandy, and stone quarries, wastelands, and in fields. This is a rather rare species.
