= Scymnobius flavifrons =

Scientific classification
- Kingdom: Animalia
- Phylum: Arthropoda
- Clade: Pancrustacea
- Class: Insecta
- Order: Coleoptera
- Suborder: Polyphaga
- Infraorder: Cucujiformia
- Family: Coccinellidae
- Genus: Scymnobius
- Species: S. flavifrons

Binomial name
- Scymnobius flavifrons (Melsheimer, 1847)

Synonyms
- Scymnus flavifrons Melsheimer, 1847; Nephus flavifrons (Melsheimer, 1847)

Species of beetle

Scymnobius flavifrons, the yellow-fronted lady beetle, is a species of dusky lady beetle in the family Coccinellidae. It is found in North America.
