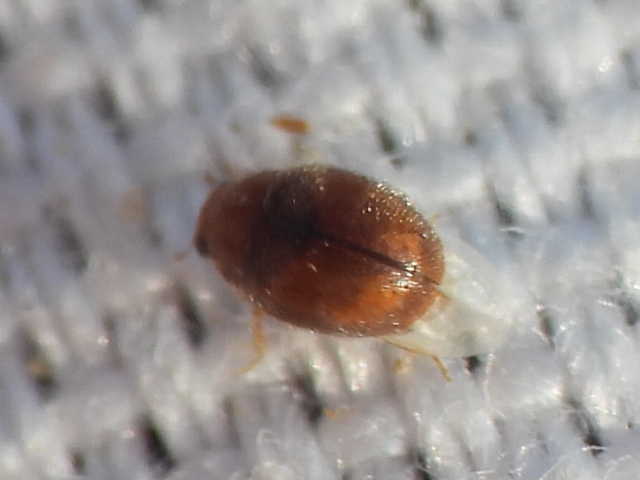

Scientific classification
- Kingdom: Animalia
- Phylum: Arthropoda
- Clade: Pancrustacea
- Class: Insecta
- Order: Coleoptera
- Suborder: Polyphaga
- Infraorder: Cucujiformia
- Family: Coccinellidae
- Genus: Scymnobius
- Species: S. intrusus

Binomial name
- Scymnobius intrusus (Horn, 1895)

Synonyms
- Scymnus intrusus Horn, 1895; Nephus intrusus (Horn, 1895)

= Scymnobius intrusus =

Species of beetle

Scymnobius intrusus is a species of dusky lady beetle in the family Coccinellidae. It is found in North America.
