= Scymnobius ecuadoricus =

Scientific classification
- Kingdom: Animalia
- Phylum: Arthropoda
- Clade: Pancrustacea
- Class: Insecta
- Order: Coleoptera
- Suborder: Polyphaga
- Infraorder: Cucujiformia
- Family: Coccinellidae
- Genus: Scymnobius
- Species: S. ecuadoricus

Binomial name
- Scymnobius ecuadoricus Gordon & González, 2002

Species of beetle

Scymnobius ecuadoricus is a species of beetle of the family Coccinellidae. It is found in Ecuador.

== Description ==
Adults reach a length of about 1.8 mm. Adults are reddish yellow. The elytron has a dark brown basal border.

== Etymology ==
The species is named for the country of origin of the type series.
