= Nephus roepkei =

Scientific classification
- Kingdom: Animalia
- Phylum: Arthropoda
- Clade: Pancrustacea
- Class: Insecta
- Order: Coleoptera
- Suborder: Polyphaga
- Infraorder: Cucujiformia
- Family: Coccinellidae
- Genus: Nephus
- Species: N. roepkei

Binomial name
- Nephus roepkei (Fluiter, 1939)

Synonyms
- Scymnus roepkei Fluiter, 1939

Species of beetle

Nephus roepkei is a species of beetle of the family Coccinellidae. It is a widespread species which was first described from Java. Other records include and China (Guangdong).

== Description ==
Adults reach a length of about 1.8 mm. Adults have a dark brown head. The pronotum is dark brown with a reddish brown anterior margin and anterolateral angle. The elytron is dark brown with a yellowish brown apex and a yellowish spot.
