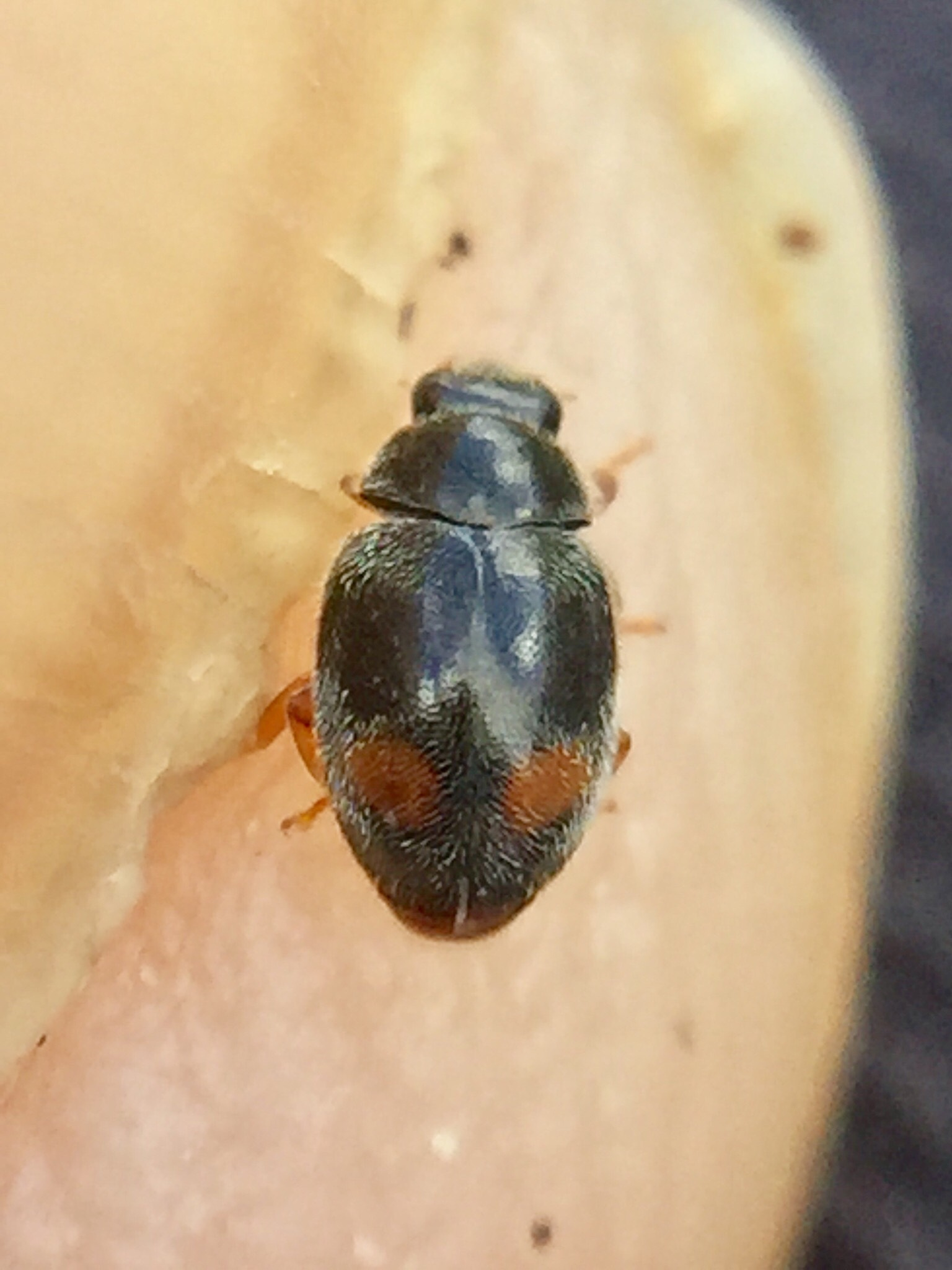

Scientific classification
- Kingdom: Animalia
- Phylum: Arthropoda
- Clade: Pancrustacea
- Class: Insecta
- Order: Coleoptera
- Suborder: Polyphaga
- Infraorder: Cucujiformia
- Family: Coccinellidae
- Genus: Nephus
- Species: N. binaevatus

Binomial name
- Nephus binaevatus (Mulsant, 1850)

= Nephus binaevatus =

Species of beetle

Nephus binaevatus is a species of dusky lady beetle in the family Coccinellidae. It is found in Africa, North America, and Oceania.
