= Stethorus emarginatus =

Scientific classification
- Kingdom: Animalia
- Phylum: Arthropoda
- Clade: Pancrustacea
- Class: Insecta
- Order: Coleoptera
- Suborder: Polyphaga
- Infraorder: Cucujiformia
- Family: Coccinellidae
- Genus: Stethorus
- Species: S. emarginatus

Binomial name
- Stethorus emarginatus Miyatake, 1966

Species of beetle

Stethorus emarginatus is a species of beetle of the family Coccinellidae. It is found in Japan (Honshu, Shikoku, Kyushu).

== Description ==
Adults reach a length of about 1.29–1.45 mm (0.051–0.057 in).
