= Scymnobius sordidus =

Scientific classification
- Kingdom: Animalia
- Phylum: Arthropoda
- Clade: Pancrustacea
- Class: Insecta
- Order: Coleoptera
- Suborder: Polyphaga
- Infraorder: Cucujiformia
- Family: Coccinellidae
- Genus: Scymnobius
- Species: S. sordidus

Binomial name
- Scymnobius sordidus (Horn, 1895)

Synonyms
- Scymnus sordidus Horn, 1895; Scymnobius sordidus (Horn, 1895)

Species of beetle

Scymnobius sordidus, known generally as the little brown mealybug destroyer or sordid ladybug, is a species of dusky lady beetle in the family Coccinellidae. It is found in North America.

In California's San Joaquin Valley, N. sordidus is an important predator of mealybugs on grapes, pistachios, and almonds, including vine mealybug, grape mealybug, and Gill's mealybug (Ferrisia gilli).
