= Scymnobius guttulatus =

Scientific classification
- Kingdom: Animalia
- Phylum: Arthropoda
- Clade: Pancrustacea
- Class: Insecta
- Order: Coleoptera
- Suborder: Polyphaga
- Infraorder: Cucujiformia
- Family: Coccinellidae
- Genus: Scymnobius
- Species: S. guttulatus

Binomial name
- Scymnobius guttulatus (LeConte, 1852)

Synonyms
- Scymnus guttulatus LeConte, 1852; Nephus guttulatus (LeConte, 1852)

Species of beetle

Scymnobius guttulatus is a species of dusky lady beetle in the family Coccinellidae. It is found in North America and Oceania.
