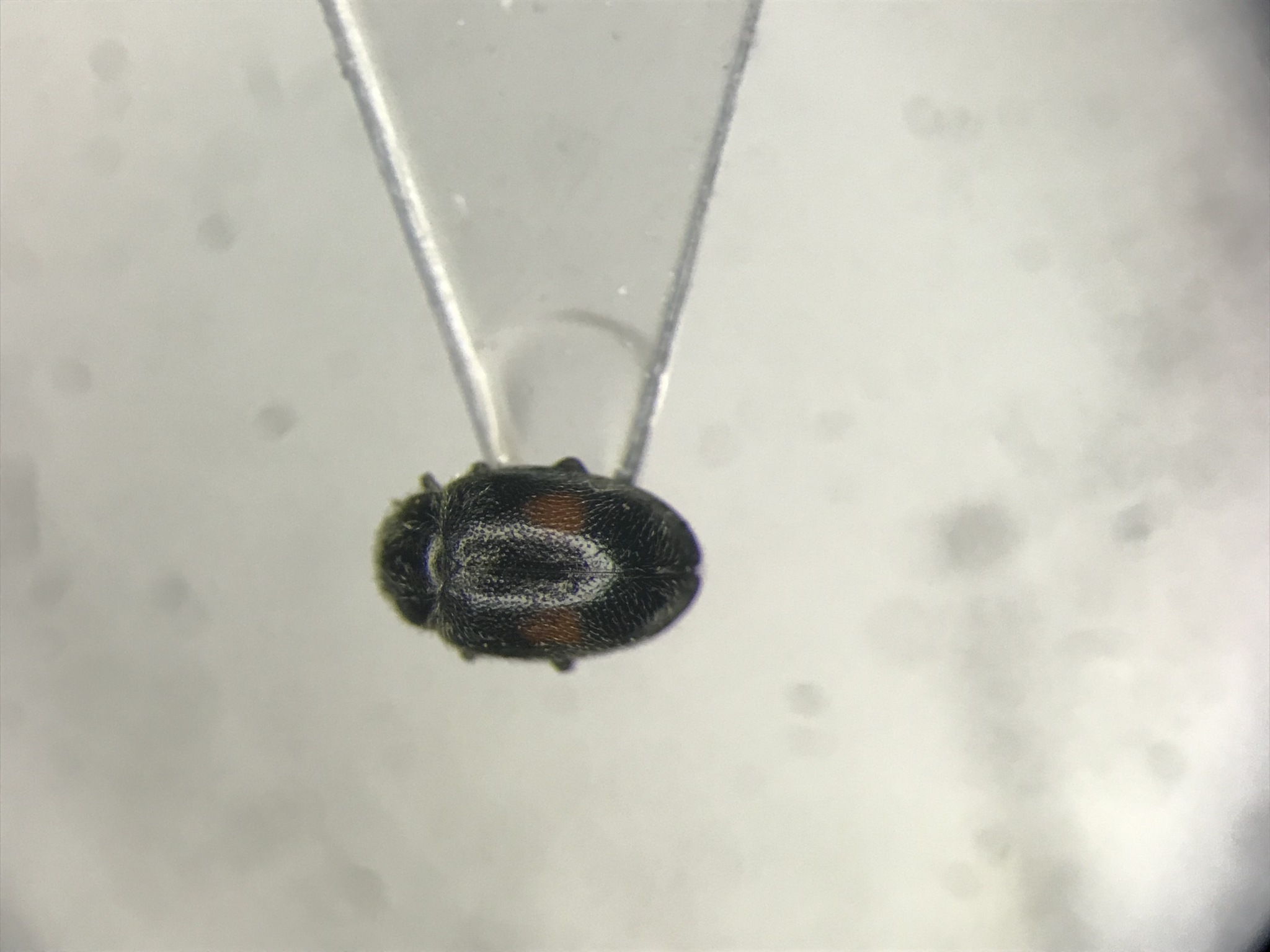
- Didion punctatum

Scientific classification
- Kingdom: Animalia
- Phylum: Arthropoda
- Class: Insecta
- Order: Coleoptera
- Suborder: Polyphaga
- Infraorder: Cucujiformia
- Family: Coccinellidae
- Genus: Scymnus
- Subgenus: Didion; Casey, 1899

= Didion (beetle) =

Genus of beetles

Didion is a subgenus of dusky lady beetles in the family Coccinellidae.

== Species ==
These species belong to the subgenus Didion:

- Scymnus hoocalis
- Scymnus longulum Casey, 1899^{i c g b}
- Scymnus nanum (LeConte, 1852)^{i c g}
- Scymnus pirikamenoko
- Scymnus punctatum (Melsheimer, 1847)^{i c g b} (twice-stained ladybug)

Data sources: i = ITIS, c = Catalogue of Life, g = GBIF, b = Bugguide.net
