= Stethorus amurensis =

Scientific classification
- Kingdom: Animalia
- Phylum: Arthropoda
- Clade: Pancrustacea
- Class: Insecta
- Order: Coleoptera
- Suborder: Polyphaga
- Infraorder: Cucujiformia
- Family: Coccinellidae
- Genus: Stethorus
- Species: S. amurensis

Binomial name
- Stethorus amurensis Iablokoff-Khnzorian, 1972

Synonyms
- Stethorus koreanus Bielawski, 1980; Stethorus shaanxiensis Pang & Mao, 1975

Species of beetle

Stethorus amurensis is a species of beetle of the family Coccinellidae. It is found in China (Beijing, Gansu, Hubei, Shaanxi), the Russian Far East and North Korea.
