= Scymnobius araguaensis =

Scientific classification
- Kingdom: Animalia
- Phylum: Arthropoda
- Clade: Pancrustacea
- Class: Insecta
- Order: Coleoptera
- Suborder: Polyphaga
- Infraorder: Cucujiformia
- Family: Coccinellidae
- Genus: Scymnobius
- Species: S. araguaensis

Binomial name
- Scymnobius araguaensis Gordon & González, 2002

Species of beetle

Scymnobius araguaensis is a species of beetle of the family Coccinellidae. It is found in Venezuela.

== Description ==
Adults reach a length of about 1.6 mm. Adults are black with a yellow head. The elytron has a large yellow spot.

== Etymology ==
The species is named for Estado Aragua, where the holotype was collected.
