= Stethorus chengi =

Scientific classification
- Kingdom: Animalia
- Phylum: Arthropoda
- Clade: Pancrustacea
- Class: Insecta
- Order: Coleoptera
- Suborder: Polyphaga
- Infraorder: Cucujiformia
- Family: Coccinellidae
- Genus: Stethorus
- Species: S. chengi

Binomial name
- Stethorus chengi Sasaji, 1968

Species of beetle

Stethorus chengi is a species of beetle of the family Coccinellidae. It is found in Taiwan, Japan (Ryukyu Islands) and China (Zhejiang, Anhui, Jiangxi, Hubei, Hunan, Sichuan, Guizhou, Shaanxi).

== Description ==
Adults reach a length of about 1.06–1.31 mm (0.042–0.052 in). The head is black, with a yellow clypeus in males, while it is yellowish brown in females. The pronotum, scutellum and elytra are entirely black.
