= Stethorus utilis =

Scientific classification
- Kingdom: Animalia
- Phylum: Arthropoda
- Clade: Pancrustacea
- Class: Insecta
- Order: Coleoptera
- Suborder: Polyphaga
- Infraorder: Cucujiformia
- Family: Coccinellidae
- Genus: Stethorus
- Species: S. utilis

Binomial name
- Stethorus utilis (Horn, 1895)

Synonyms
- Scymnus utilis Horn, 1895; Stethorus atomus Casey, 1899

Species of beetle

Stethorus utilis is a species of lady beetle in the family Coccinellidae. It is found in North America, where it has been recorded from North Carolina to Florida, west to eastern Texas.

== Description ==
Adults reach a length of about 1–2 mm. They have a black body, while the antennae, mouthparts and legs are yellow.
