= Scymnobius =

Scientific classification
- Kingdom: Animalia
- Phylum: Arthropoda
- Clade: Pancrustacea
- Class: Insecta
- Order: Coleoptera
- Suborder: Polyphaga
- Infraorder: Cucujiformia
- Family: Coccinellidae
- Tribe: Coccidulini
- Genus: Scymnobius; Casey, 1899

Genus of beetles

Scymnobius is a genus of lady beetles in the family Coccinellidae, formerly in the genus Nephus.

== Species ==
- Scymnobius araguaensis Gordon & González, 2002
- Scymnobius aricaensis Gordon & González, 2002
- Scymnobius atramentarius (Boheman, 1859)
- Scymnobius bilucernarius (Mulsant, 1850)
- Scymnobius bivulnerus (Horn, 1895)
- Scymnobius caliginosus Gordon & González, 2002
- Scymnobius ecuadoricus Gordon & González, 2002
- Scymnobius flavifrons (Melsheimer, 1847) (yellow-fronted lady beetle)
- Scymnobius galapagoensis (Waterhouse, 1845)
- Scymnobius gordoni (Dozier, 1971)
- Scymnobius guttulatus (LeConte, 1852)
- Scymnobius imitator Gordon & González, 2002
- Scymnobius intrusus (Horn, 1895)
- Scymnobius obscurus (Mulsant, 1850)
- Scymnobius pernambucensis Giorgi & González, 2002
- Scymnobius quadrarius (LeConte, 1924)
- Scymnobius rotundus Gordon & González, 2002
- Scymnobius scalesius Gordon & González, 2002
- Scymnobius sordidus (Horn, 1895) (little brown mealybug destroyer)
- Scymnobius timberlakei (Gordon, 1985)
- Scymnobius triangularis Gordon & González, 2002
- Scymnobius wickhami (Gordon, 1976)
