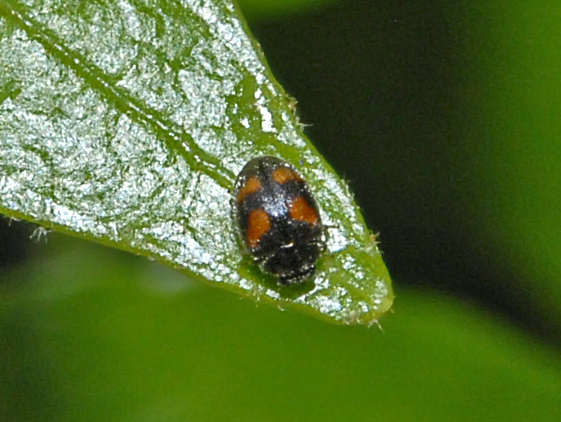

Scientific classification
- Kingdom: Animalia
- Phylum: Arthropoda
- Clade: Pancrustacea
- Class: Insecta
- Order: Coleoptera
- Suborder: Polyphaga
- Infraorder: Cucujiformia
- Family: Coccinellidae
- Genus: Nephus
- Species: N. quadrimaculatus

Binomial name
- Nephus quadrimaculatus (Herbst, 1783)

Synonyms
- Scymnus quadrimaculatus (Herbst, 1783)

= Nephus quadrimaculatus =

Species of beetle

Nephus quadrimaculatus is a species of ladybird belonging to the family Coccinellidae. It was first described by Johann Friedrich Wilhelm Herbst in 1783.

== Description ==
Nephus quadrimaculatus can reach a length of 1.5–2 millimetres (0.059–0.079 in) and feeds on aphids and mealybugs. Elytra are black, each with two red-yellow, kidney-shaped spots.

== Distribution ==
This species is present in most of Europe, inhabiting warm areas in the lowlands and on the lower slopes of mountains. It occurs in forests and parks on a variety of deciduous trees and ivy (Hedera species).
