= Scymnus hoocalis =

Scientific classification
- Kingdom: Animalia
- Phylum: Arthropoda
- Clade: Pancrustacea
- Class: Insecta
- Order: Coleoptera
- Suborder: Polyphaga
- Infraorder: Cucujiformia
- Family: Coccinellidae
- Genus: Scymnus
- Species: S. hoocalis

Binomial name
- Scymnus hoocalis Pang & Gordon, 1986

Synonyms
- Scymnus (Scymnus) formosanus Fürsch, 1960 (preocc.); Scymnus (Pullus) notus Pang & Pu, 1990; Scymnus (Pullus) pangi Fürsch, 1989

Species of beetle

Scymnus hoocalis is a species of beetle of the family Coccinellidae. It is found in Taiwan and China (Hainan, Guangxi).

== Description ==
Adults reach a length of about 2.4 mm. Adults have a reddish yellow head and pronotum. The elytron is reddish brown on the disc, but becoming dark brown laterally. The apical one-third is yellow.
