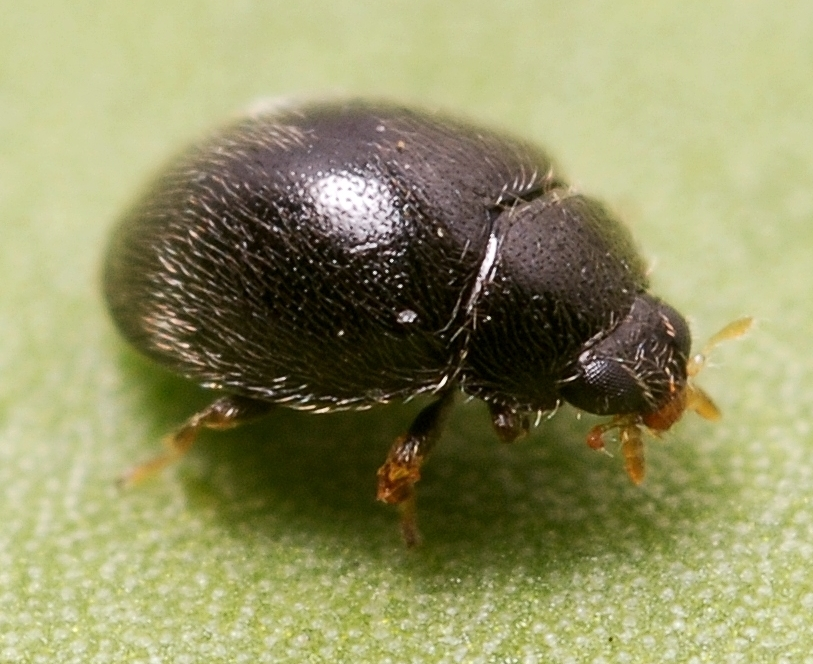
- Stethorus punctillum

Scientific classification
- Kingdom: Animalia
- Phylum: Arthropoda
- Clade: Pancrustacea
- Class: Insecta
- Order: Coleoptera
- Suborder: Polyphaga
- Infraorder: Cucujiformia
- Family: Coccinellidae
- Tribe: Coccidulini
- Genus: Stethorus; Weise, 1885

Synonyms
- Nephopullus Brèthes, 1924

= Stethorus =

Genus of beetles

Stethorus is a genus of spider mite destroyers in the beetle family Coccinellidae. There are more than 40 described species in Stethorus.

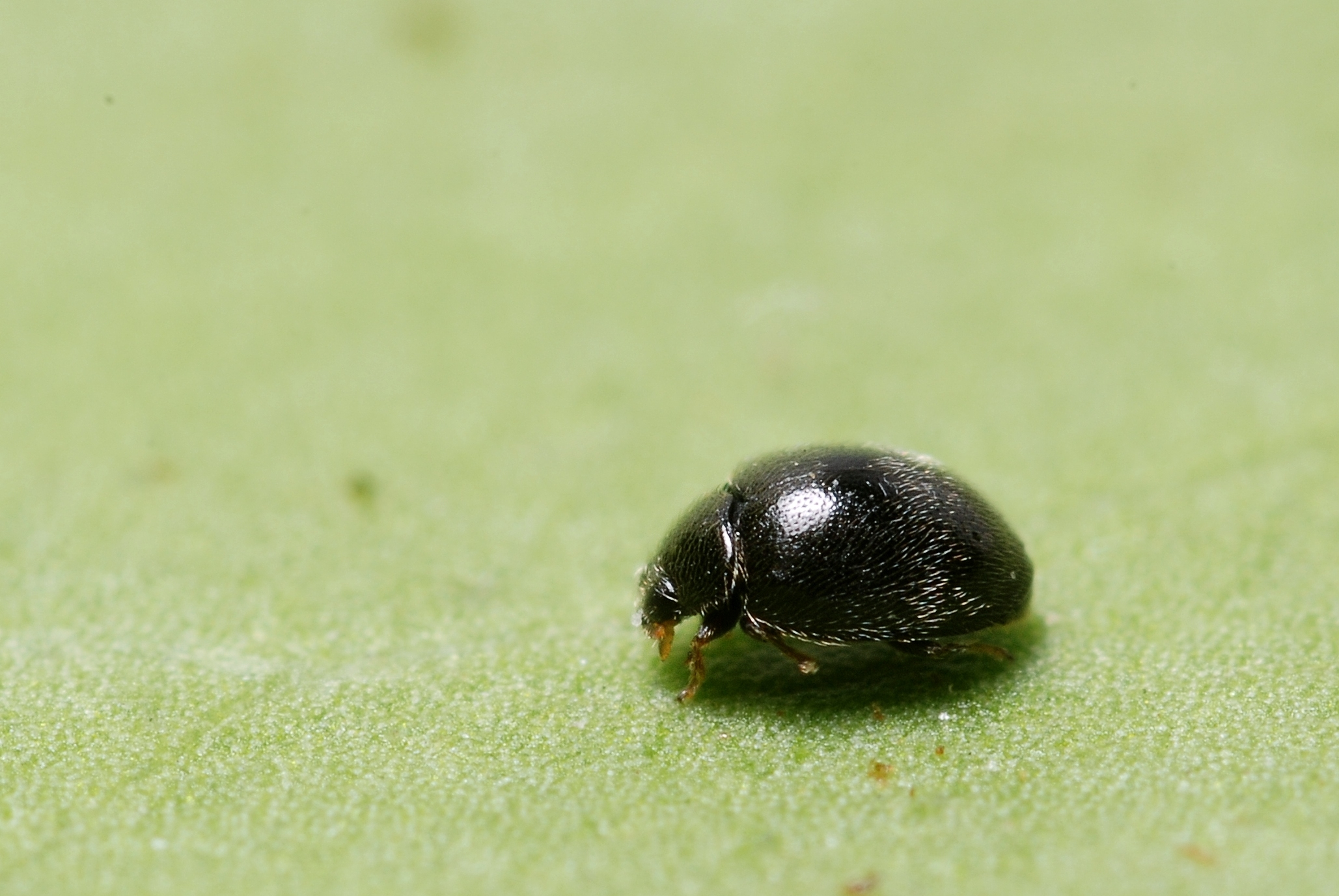
Stethorus punctillum

== Species ==
These species belong to the genus Stethorus:

- Stethorus aethiops
- Stethorus albipes (Mulsant, 1850)
- Stethorus amurensis
- Stethorus aptus Kapur, 1948
- Stethorus balearicus Fursch, 1987
- Stethorus bifidus Kapur, 1948
- Stethorus binchuanensis
- Stethorus brasilensis Gordon & Chapin, 1983
- Stethorus brevifoliatus
- Stethorus cantonensis
- Stethorus caseyi Gordon & Chapin, 1983
- Stethorus chazeaui
- Stethorus chengi Sasaji, 1968
- Stethorus comoriensis Chazeau, 1971
- Stethorus convexus
- Stethorus cribripennis (Champion, 1913)
- Stethorus cruralis
- Stethorus darwini
- Stethorus dongchuanensis
- Stethorus emarginatus Miyatake, 1966
- Stethorus endroedyi
- Stethorus exspectatus
- Stethorus exsultabilis
- Stethorus fenestralis
- Stethorus fijiensis Kapur, 1948
- Stethorus forficatus
- Stethorus fractus Gordon & Chapin, 1983
- Stethorus fuerschi
- Stethorus gangliiformis
- Stethorus gilvifrons (Mulsant, 1850)
- Stethorus granum
- Stethorus griseus
- Stethorus grossepunctatus Gordon & Chapin, 1983
- Stethorus hasonbinhensis
- Stethorus hirashimai Sasaji, 1967
- Stethorus inflatus
- Stethorus jejunus Casey
- Stethorus keralicus
- Stethorus klapperichi Yu, 1995
- Stethorus loi Sasaji, 1968
- Stethorus longisiphonulus
- Stethorus madecassus
- Stethorus magnus
- Stethorus mayaroi Gordon & Chapin, 1983
- Stethorus micellus Gordon & Chapin, 1983
- Stethorus minutalus Gordon & Chapin, 1983
- Stethorus minutissimus
- Stethorus muriculatus Yu, 1995
- Stethorus murilloi Gordon
- Stethorus parapauperculus
- Stethorus parcepunctatus Kapur, 1948
- Stethorus pauperculus
- Stethorus peruvianus Gonzalez, Gordon & Robinson, 2008
- Stethorus pinachi Gordon & Chapin, 1983
- Stethorus proximus Chazeau, 1979
- Stethorus pseudocaribus Gordon & Chapin, 1983
- Stethorus punctum (LeConte, 1852) (spider mite destroyer)
- Stethorus pusillus (Herbst, 1797) (lesser mite destroyer)
- Stethorus rani Kapur, 1948
- Stethorus salutaris Kapur, 1948
- Stethorus sichuanensis
- Stethorus silvestris Chazeau, 1995
- Stethorus simillimus Gordon & Chapin, 1983
- Stethorus siphonulus Kapur, 1948
- Stethorus strenus
- Stethorus takakoae Seki & Maruyama, 2025
- Stethorus tenerifensis Fürsch, 1987
- Stethorus tetranychi Kapur, 1948
- Stethorus tridens Gordon
- Stethorus tsutsuii
- Stethorus tunicatus
- Stethorus uncinellus
- Stethorus utilis (Horn, 1895)
- Stethorus vagans (Blackburn, 1892)
- Stethorus vietnamicus
- Stethorus vinsoni Kapur, 1948
- Stethorus wagneri
- Stethorus weisei
- Stethorus wollastoni Kapur, 1948
- Stethorus wulingicus
- Stethorus xinglongicus
- Stethorus yezoensis Miyatake, 1966
- Stethorus yingjiangensis

== Selected former species ==
- Stethorus japonicus H.Kamiya, 1959
- Stethorus punctillum (Weise, 1891)
