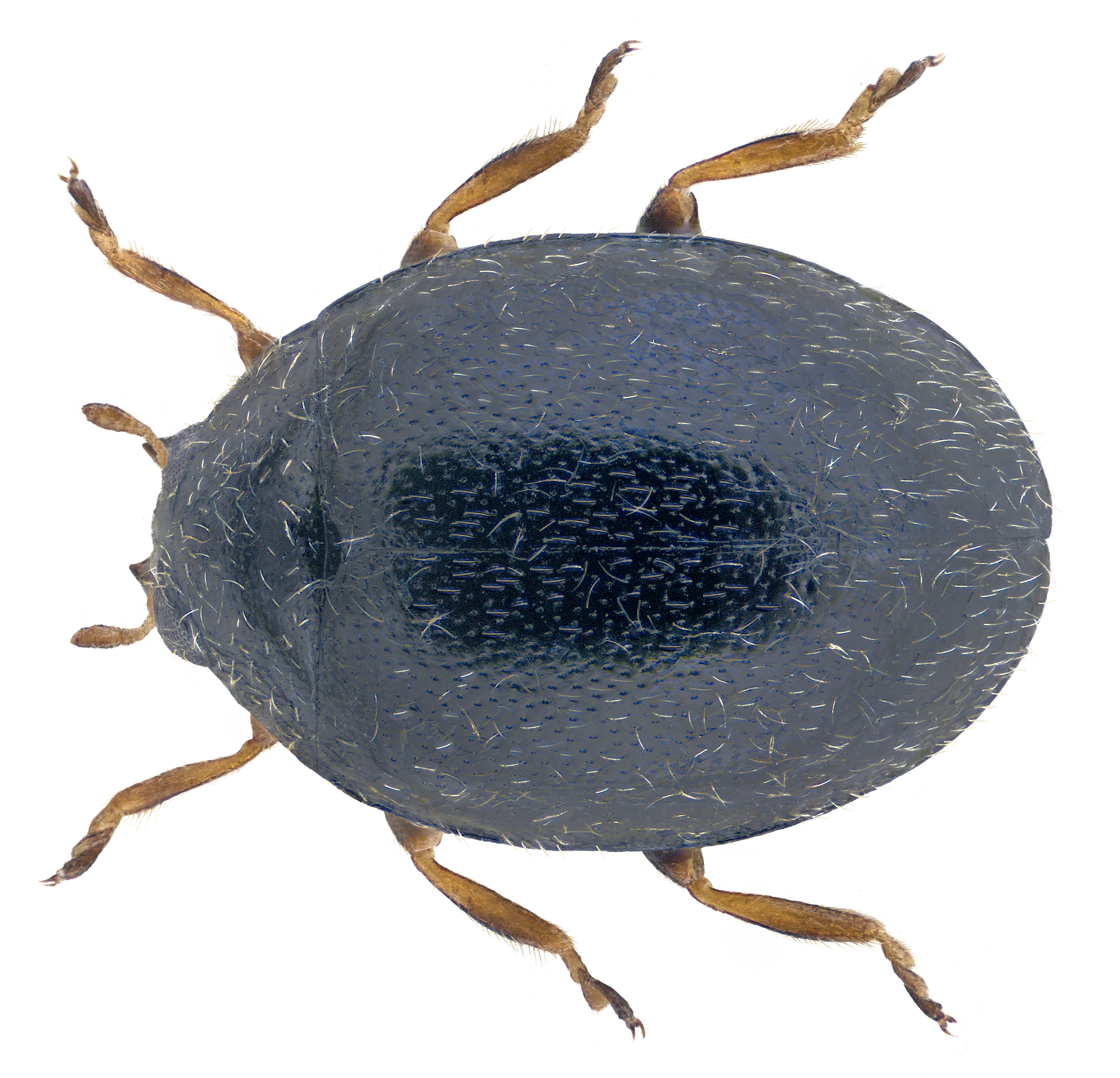

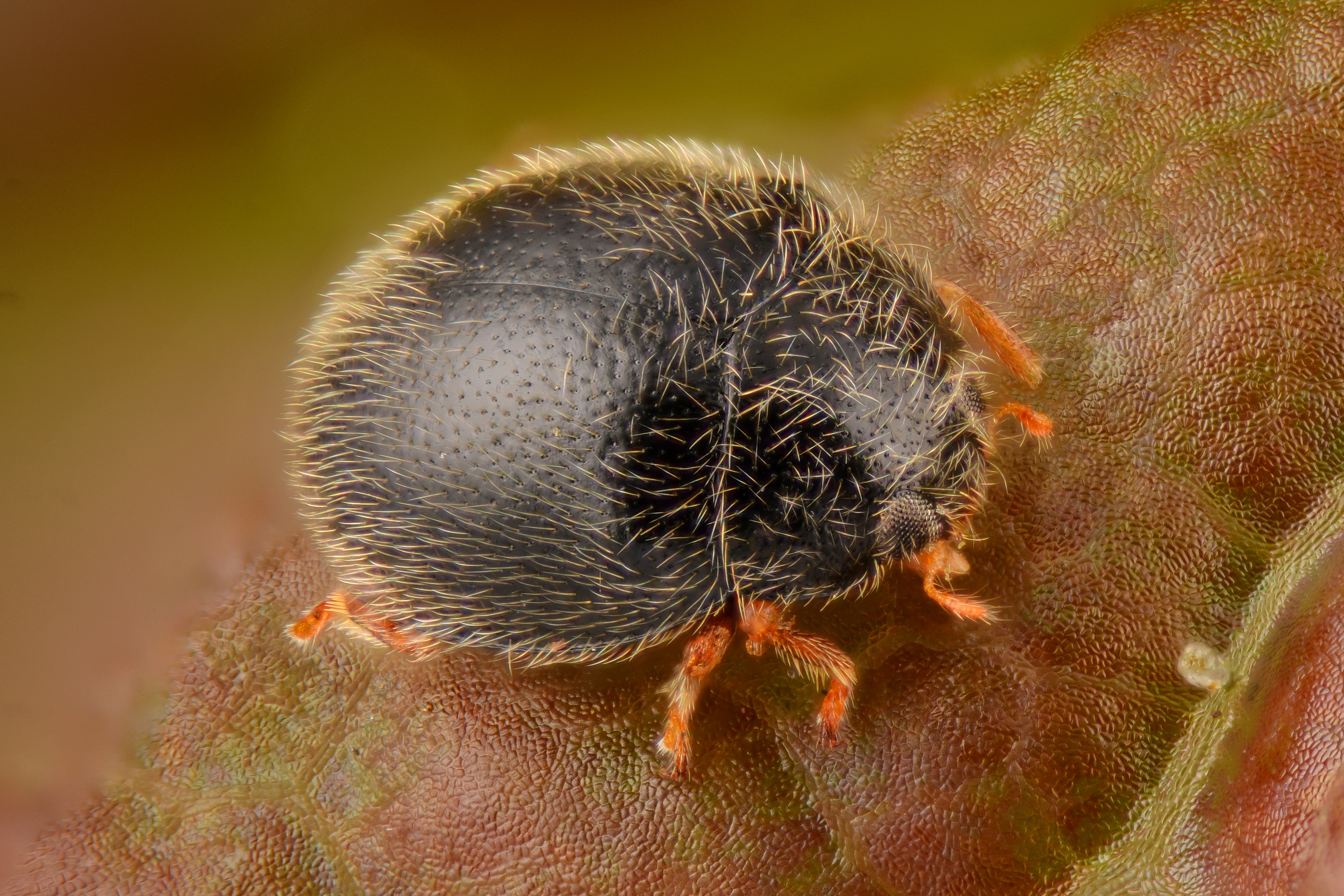

Scientific classification
- Kingdom: Animalia
- Phylum: Arthropoda
- Clade: Pancrustacea
- Class: Insecta
- Order: Coleoptera
- Suborder: Polyphaga
- Infraorder: Cucujiformia
- Family: Coccinellidae
- Genus: Stethorus
- Species: S. pusillus

Binomial name
- Stethorus pusillus (Herbst, 1797)

Synonyms
- Scymnus pusillus Herbst, 1797; Coccinella minima Rossi, 1794 (preocc.); Scymnus testaceus var. concolor Weise, 1887; Stethorus punctillum Weise, 1891; Stethorus punctillum var. investitus Roubal, 1920

= Stethorus pusillus =

Species of beetle

Stethorus pusillus, known generally as the lesser mite destroyer or spider mite destroyer, is a species of beetle of the family Coccinellidae. It is found in Japan (Hokkaido, Honshu, Shikoku, Kyushu), on the Kuril Islands and the Korean Peninsula, as well as in north-eastern and central China, Mongolia, Central Asia, western Asia, the Caucasus, Europe, North Africa, North America and Eurasia.

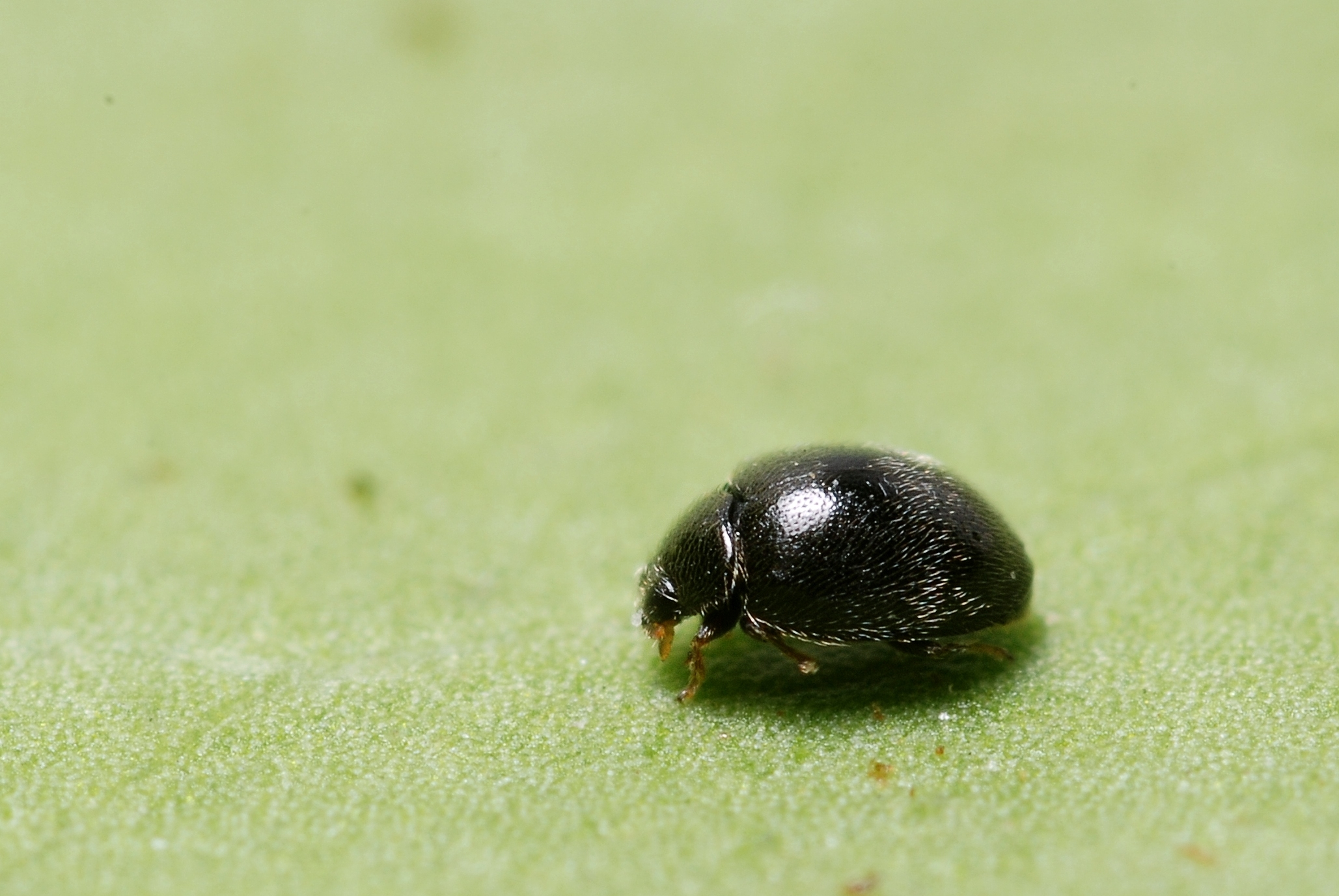
Lesser mite destroyer, Stethorus pusillus

== Description ==
Adults reach a length of about 1.13–1.53 mm (0.044–0.060 in). They have a black body, while the antennae, mouthparts and legs are brownish yellow.

== Life history ==
They prey on tetranychid mites.
