= Scymnobius obscurus =

Scientific classification
- Kingdom: Animalia
- Phylum: Arthropoda
- Clade: Pancrustacea
- Class: Insecta
- Order: Coleoptera
- Suborder: Polyphaga
- Infraorder: Cucujiformia
- Family: Coccinellidae
- Genus: Scymnobius
- Species: S. obscurus

Binomial name
- Scymnobius obscurus (Mulsant, 1850)

Synonyms
- Scymnus obscurus Mulsant, 1850

Species of beetle

Scymnobius obscurus is a species of beetle of the family Coccinellidae. It is found in Argentina, Brazil, Guyana, Colombia, Venezuela, Tobago and Trinidad.

== Description ==
Adults reach a length of about 1.5–1.6 mm. Adults are dark brown with a yellow head and legs.
