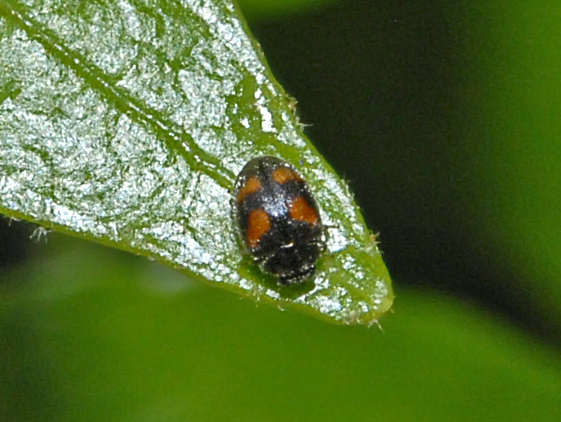
- Nephus quadrimaculatus

Scientific classification
- Kingdom: Animalia
- Phylum: Arthropoda
- Clade: Pancrustacea
- Class: Insecta
- Order: Coleoptera
- Suborder: Polyphaga
- Infraorder: Cucujiformia
- Family: Coccinellidae
- Tribe: Coccidulini
- Genus: Nephus; Mulsant, 1846

Synonyms
- Aponephus Booth, 1991

= Nephus =

Genus of beetles

Nephus is a genus of lady beetles in the family Coccinellidae. There are more than 25 described species in Nephus. Several former species are now in the genus Scymnobius.

== Species ==
- Nephus aguilari Gourreau, 1975
- Nephus anachoretus
- Nephus ancoralis
- Nephus angustus
- Nephus apolonia
- Nephus arcuatus
- Nephus asiaticus
- Nephus basilewskyi
- Nephus basimaculatus
- Nephus besucheti
- Nephus bicoloratus
- Nephus bielawskii
- Nephus bilinearis
- Nephus binaevatus (Mulsant, 1850)
- Nephus binotatus Brisout, 1863
- Nephus bipunctatus (Kugelann, 1794)
- Nephus bisignatus (Boheman, 1850)
- Nephus bistillatus
- Nephus boninensis
- Nephus brevipilosus
- Nephus burgeoni
- Nephus caneparii
- Nephus castaneicolor
- Nephus caucasicus
- Nephus conjunctus Wollaston, 1870
- Nephus crucifer
- Nephus cylindricus
- Nephus defluentus
- Nephus depressiusculus (Wollaston, 1867)
- Nephus derroni
- Nephus deserticola
- Nephus desertus
- Nephus dichosiphonicus
- Nephus dilepismoides
- Nephus directotrichus
- Nephus dubiosus
- Nephus eburneus
- Nephus elegantulus
- Nephus erratus
- Nephus eurypodus
- Nephus fauveli
- Nephus fenestratus
- Nephus fijiensis
- Nephus flavomaculatus
- Nephus flavopictus (Wollaston, 1854)
- Nephus ganglbaueri
- Nephus garciai
- Nephus georgei (Weise, 1929) (George's lady beetle)
- Nephus globulus
- Nephus guttiformis
- Nephus hiekei (Fursch, 1965)
- Nephus humayuni
- Nephus humerosus
- Nephus incinctus
- Nephus incisus
- Nephus incomitatus
- Nephus jacobsoni Barovskij, 1906
- Nephus jucundus
- Nephus kaiensis
- Nephus kamburovi
- Nephus kamerunensis
- Nephus kaszabi
- Nephus kiesenwetteri Mulsant, 1850
- Nephus koltzei
- Nephus kompirasanus
- Nephus koreanus
- Nephus korschefskyi
- Nephus kreissli
- Nephus kreticus Fursch, 1965
- Nephus kuznetsovi
- Nephus lentiformis
- Nephus levaillanti Mulsant, 1850
- Nephus limonii (Donisthorpe, 1903)
- Nephus lindbergi
- Nephus ludyi (Weise, 1897)
- Nephus luteopictus
- Nephus macer
- Nephus maderi
- Nephus martellii
- Nephus melinus
- Nephus merkli
- Nephus microglobosus
- Nephus minqinensis
- Nephus montivagans
- Nephus neixiangicus
- Nephus nigricans Weise, 1879
- Nephus nigripes
- Nephus njalensis
- Nephus oblongosignatus
- Nephus ocellatus
- Nephus ochripes
- Nephus okahandjensis
- Nephus olgae
- Nephus olibroides
- Nephus ornatulus
- Nephus ornatus (LeConte, 1850) (ornate lady beetle)
- Nephus oshimaensis
- Nephus pajori
- Nephus palauensis
- Nephus palmi
- Nephus patruus
- Nephus peyerimhoffi (Sicard, 1923)
- Nephus phenacoccophagus
- Nephus phosphorus
- Nephus plagifer
- Nephus pooti Fursch, 1999
- Nephus pulchelloides
- Nephus quadrimaculatus (Herbst, 1783)
- Nephus redtenbacheri (Mulsant, 1846)
- Nephus redundans
- Nephus regularis
- Nephus relictus
- Nephus reunioni (Fursch, 1974)
- Nephus roberi
- Nephus roepkei (Fluiter, 1938)
- Nephus rubridorsis
- Nephus rudepunctatus
- Nephus rufifrons
- Nephus rugulipennis
- Nephus ryuguus
- Nephus ryukyuensis
- Nephus sauteri
- Nephus schatzmayri Canepari & Tedeschi, 1977
- Nephus schwarzi Gordon, 1976
- Nephus semitectus
- Nephus severini
- Nephus shikokensis
- Nephus similincludens
- Nephus sinuatomaculatus
- Nephus solivagus
- Nephus somaliensis
- Nephus soudanensis
- Nephus stigmoides
- Nephus subcircularis
- Nephus sudanicus
- Nephus tagiapatus
- Nephus tamaricis
- Nephus theobromae
- Nephus transvaalensis
- Nephus triblulus
- Nephus ulbrichi Fursch, 1977
- Nephus valens
- Nephus vantonderae
- Nephus ventriosus
- Nephus vetustus
- Nephus voeltzkowi Weise, 1910
- Nephus vulcanicus
- Nephus vulpecula
- Nephus weyrichi
- Nephus windhukensis
- Nephus wittmeri
- Nephus wrasei
- Nephus wushanus
- Nephus yotsumon
- Nephus ziegleri
- Nephus ziguiensis
