= Neopullus =

Scientific classification
- Kingdom: Animalia
- Phylum: Arthropoda
- Class: Insecta
- Order: Coleoptera
- Suborder: Polyphaga
- Infraorder: Cucujiformia
- Family: Coccinellidae
- Genus: Scymnus
- Subgenus: Neopullus; Sasaji, 1971

Genus of beetles

Neopullus is a subgenus of beetle in the family Coccinellidae.

== Species ==
- Scymnus babai
- Scymnus brevicollis
- Scymnus camptodromus
- Scymnus fuscatus
- Scymnus haemorrhoidalis
- Scymnus hoffmanni
- Scymnus lijiangensis
- Scymnus limbatus
- Scymnus loebli
- Scymnus lulangicus
- Scymnus lycotropus
- Scymnus minisculus
- Scymnus nakaikemensis
- Scymnus nigromarginalis
- Scymnus nigroventralis
- Scymnus ningshanensis
- Scymnus ohtai
- Scymnus otohime
- Scymnus paralleus
- Scymnus quercanus
- Scymnus savanus
- Scymnus sinuanodulus
- Scymnus tachengicus
- Scymnus taishuensis
- Scymnus testaceus
- Scymnus thecacontus
- Scymnus yamato
