= Scymnus babai =

Scientific classification
- Kingdom: Animalia
- Phylum: Arthropoda
- Clade: Pancrustacea
- Class: Insecta
- Order: Coleoptera
- Suborder: Polyphaga
- Infraorder: Cucujiformia
- Family: Coccinellidae
- Genus: Scymnus
- Species: S. babai

Binomial name
- Scymnus babai Sasaji, 1971

Species of beetle

Scymnus babai is a species of beetle of the family Coccinellidae. It is found in Japan and China (Beijing, Jilin, Jiangsu, Liaoning, Shandong, Zhejiang).

== Description ==
Adults reach a length of about 2.2–2.7 mm. They have a yellow to yellowish brown head. The pronotum is yellow to yellowish brown with a large basal spot and the elytron is black, with the apex reddish brown.
