= Scymnus yamato =

Scientific classification
- Kingdom: Animalia
- Phylum: Arthropoda
- Clade: Pancrustacea
- Class: Insecta
- Order: Coleoptera
- Suborder: Polyphaga
- Infraorder: Cucujiformia
- Family: Coccinellidae
- Genus: Scymnus
- Species: S. yamato

Binomial name
- Scymnus yamato Kamiya, 1961

Species of beetle

Scymnus yamato is a species of beetle of the family Coccinellidae. It is found in Japan and China (Beijing, Henan, Sichuan).

== Description ==
Adults reach a length of about 2.3–2.8 mm. Males have a yellowish brown to reddish brown head, while the head of the females is black. Normally, the pronotum is black, with a brown anterolateral angle, but it may also be brown with a brown anterolateral angle and a black spot. The elytron is brown to reddish brown with blackish basal, sutural and lateral margins.
