= Scymnus japonicus =

Scientific classification
- Kingdom: Animalia
- Phylum: Arthropoda
- Clade: Pancrustacea
- Class: Insecta
- Order: Coleoptera
- Suborder: Polyphaga
- Infraorder: Cucujiformia
- Family: Coccinellidae
- Genus: Scymnus
- Species: S. japonicus

Binomial name
- Scymnus japonicus (Weise, 1879)

Synonyms
- Scymnus ferrugatus var. japonicus Weise, 1879

Species of beetle

Scymnus japonicus is a species of beetle of the family Coccinellidae. It is found in Japan and China (Yunnan).

== Description ==
Adults reach a length of about 2.5–3.2 mm. They have a yellowish brown head and pronotum, the latter sometimes with a black spot. The elytron is black, while the apex is yellowish brown.
