= Scymnus floralis =

Scientific classification
- Kingdom: Animalia
- Phylum: Arthropoda
- Clade: Pancrustacea
- Class: Insecta
- Order: Coleoptera
- Suborder: Polyphaga
- Infraorder: Cucujiformia
- Family: Coccinellidae
- Genus: Scymnus
- Species: S. floralis

Binomial name
- Scymnus floralis (Fabricius, 1792)

Synonyms
- Nitidula floralis Fabricius, 1792

Species of beetle

Scymnus floralis is a species of beetle of the family Coccinellidae. It is native to the West Indies and has also been recorded from Bermuda.

== Description ==
Adults reach a length of about 1.65–2 mm. Adults are yellowish red, although the pronotum is mostly black. The basal, sutural and lateral margins of the elytron are black.

== Biology ==
They prey on aphid species.
