= Scymnus ceylonicus =

Scientific classification
- Kingdom: Animalia
- Phylum: Arthropoda
- Clade: Pancrustacea
- Class: Insecta
- Order: Coleoptera
- Suborder: Polyphaga
- Infraorder: Cucujiformia
- Family: Coccinellidae
- Genus: Scymnus
- Species: S. ceylonicus

Binomial name
- Scymnus ceylonicus Motschulsky, 1858

Species of beetle

Scymnus ceylonicus is a species of lady beetle found in India and Sri Lanka.

It is a main predator on mulberry aphids.
