= List of beetles of Nepal (Coccinellidae) =

The following is a list of Coccinellidae of Nepal, primarily based on Claudio Canepari and San Donato Milanese's "Coccinellidae (Coleoptera) from the Nepal Himalayas", A.P. Kapur's "Coccinellidae of Nepal", "The Coccinellidae of the Third Mount Everest Expedition, 1924 (coleoptera)" and J. Poorani's 2004 "An Annotated Checklist of the Coccinellidae (Coleoptera) of the Indian Subregion" with some recent additions and a modernized classification.

== Subfamily Sticholotidinae ==
- Jauravia
  - Jauravia assamensis
  - Jauravia limbata
  - Jauravia quadrinotata
- Serangium sp.
- Sticholotis
  - Sticholotis amator
  - Sticholotis duodecimmaculata
  - Sticholotis decempunctata
  - Sticholotis duodecimpunctata
  - Sticholotis nepalensis
  - Sticholotis kumatai
  - Sticholotis rufolimbata
- Ghanius schawalleri

== Subfamily Scymninae ==
- Pseudoscymnus
  - Pseudoscymnus funerarius
  - Pseudoscymnus luteoniger
  - Pseudoscymnus nepalicus
  - Pseudoscymnus ocelliferus
- Pharoscymnus flexibilis
- Scymnus
  - Scymnus nubilus
  - Scymnus sufflavus
  - Scymnus trisulicus
  - Scymnus tristigmaticus
  - Scymnus (Pullus) mellinus
  - Scymnus (Pullus) besucheti
  - Scymnus (Pullus) posticalis
  - Scymnus (Pullus) nepalensis
  - Scymnus (Pullus) bourdilloni
  - Scymnus (Pullus) victoris
  - Scymnus (Pullus) hepaticus
  - Scymnus (Pullus) godavariensis
  - Scymnus (Pullus) janetscheki
  - Scymnus (Pullus) sodalis
  - Scymnus (Pullus) rufoniger
  - Scymnus (Pullus) schawalleri
  - Scymnus (Pullus) martensi
  - Scymnus (Pullus) exilis
  - Scymnus (Pullus) fruticis
  - Scymnus (Pullus) lucicolus
  - Scymnus (Pullus) pyrocheilus
  - Scymnus (Pullus) kosianus
  - Scymnus (Pullus) suturaloides
  - Scymnus (Neopullus) fuscatus
  - Scymnus (Orthoscymnus) smetanai
  - Scymnus (Orthoscymnus) rhododendri
- Pullus
  - Pullus bourdilloni
  - Pullus testacecollis
  - Pullus hingstoni
- Cryptogonus
  - Cryptogonus quadriguttatus
  - Cryptogonus trioblitus
  - Cryptogonus hingstoni
  - Cryptogonus himalayensis
  - Cryptogonus orbiculus
  - Cryptogonus postmedialis
  - Cryptogonus ariasi
  - Cryptogonus bimaculatus
  - Cryptogonus complexus
  - Cryptogonus nepalensis
- Hyperaspis marginaloides

== Subfamily Chilocorinae ==
- Exochomus timurensis
- Platynaspidius saundersi
- Platynaspis
  - Platynaspis ocellimaculata
  - Platynaspis nepalensis
- Chilocorus
  - Chilocorus circumdatus
  - Chilocorus hauseri
  - Chilocorus braeti
  - Chilocorus matsumurai
  - Chilocorus nigritus
  - Chilocorus politus
  - Chilocorus rubidus
  - Chilocorus bijugus
- Priscibrumus
  - Priscibrumus uropygialis
  - Priscibrumus disjunctus
- Brumoides
  - Brumoides lineatus
  - Brumoides suturalis
- Lithophilus lindemannae

== Subfamily Coccidulinae ==
- Sumnius
  - Sumnius renardi
  - Sumnius tanhhoaensis
  - Sumnius hoangi
  - Sumnius vestita
- Novius
  - Novius octoguttata
  - Novius sexnotata

== Subfamily Coccinellinae ==
- Adalia tetraspilota
- Aiolocaria
  - Aiolocaria dodecaspilota
  - Aiolocaria hexaspilota
- Alloneda dodecaspilota
- Ballia gustavi
- Bothrocalvia decemsignata
- Bulaea nevilli
- Calvia
  - Calvia shiva
  - Calvia durgae
  - Calvia trilochana
  - Calvia pinaki
  - Calvia pasupati
  - Calvia quatuordecimguttata
  - Calvia sykesii
  - Calvia vulnerata
  - Calvia breiti
- Cheilomenes sexmaculata
- Coccinella
  - Coccinella magnopunctata
  - Coccinella nepalensis
  - Coccinella saucerottei
  - Coccinella lama
  - Coccinella luteopicta
  - Coccinella nigrovittata
  - Coccinella septempunctata
  - Coccinella transversalis
- Coelophora
  - Coelophora biplagiata
  - Coelophora bissellata
  - Coelophora circumvelata
  - Coelophora saucia
  - Coelophora sexareata
  - Coelophora nitidicollis
- Halyzia
  - Halyzia straminea
  - Halyzia sanscrita
  - Halyzia straminea
- Harmonia
  - Harmonia axyridis
  - Harmonia dimidiata
  - Harmonia eucharis
- Hippodamia
  - Hippodamia arctica
  - Hippodamia heydeni
  - Hippodamia variegata
- Illeis
  - Illeis bistigmosa
  - Illeis confusa
- Micraspis
  - Micraspis vincta
  - Micraspis univittata
- Oenopia
  - Oenopia signatella
  - Oenopia sexareata
  - Oenopia kirbyi
  - Oenopia sauzeti
  - Oenopia mimica
  - Oenopia smetanai
  - Oenopia diabolica
  - Oenopia billieti
  - Oenopia quadripunctata
- Propylea
  - Propylea dissecta
  - Propylea luteopustulata
- Palaeoneda miniata
- Synonycha grandis
- Afidenta misera
- Afidentula
  - Afidentula himalayana
  - Afidentula bisquadripunctata
  - Afidentula manderstjernae
- Afissa
  - Afissa congener
  - Afissa gibbera
  - Afissa hingstoni
  - Afissula sanscrita
  - Afissa bengalica
  - Afissa nepalensis
  - Afissa dumerili
  - Afissa hendecaspilota
  - Afissa mystica
  - Afissa nielamuensis
  - Afissa gorkhana
  - Afissa elvina
  - Afissa marginicollis
  - Afissa mysticoides
  - Afissula rana
  - Afissula macularis
  - Afissula parvula
  - Afissula kambaitana
- Diekeana grayi
- Henosepilachna
  - Henosepilachna decemmaculata
  - Henosepilachna hopeiana
  - Henosepilachna schawalleri
  - Henosepilachna indica
  - Henosepilachna pusillanima
  - Henosepilachna sikkimica
  - Henosepilachna undecimspilota
  - Henosepilachna vigintioctopunctata
  - Henosepilachna vigintioctomaculata
  - Henosepilachna dodecastigma
  - Henosepilachna kathmanduensis
  - Henosepilachna ocellata
  - Henosepilachna laesicollis
- Singhikalia ornata

== See also ==
- List of butterflies of Nepal
- Odonata of Nepal
- Cerambycidae of Nepal
- Zygaenidae of Nepal
- Sphingidae of Nepal
- Wildlife of Nepal
