= Oenopia =

Oenopia may refer to:

- Oenopia, ancient name of the Greek island of Aegina
- Oenopia (beetle), a genus of ladybird beetles in the family Coccinellidae
