= Priscibrumus trubetzkoi =

Scientific classification
- Kingdom: Animalia
- Phylum: Arthropoda
- Clade: Pancrustacea
- Class: Insecta
- Order: Coleoptera
- Suborder: Polyphaga
- Infraorder: Cucujiformia
- Family: Coccinellidae
- Genus: Priscibrumus
- Species: P. trubetzkoi

Binomial name
- Priscibrumus trubetzkoi (Barovsky, 1927)

Synonyms
- Exochomus trubetzkoi Barovsky, 1927

Species of beetle

Priscibrumus trubetzkoi is a species of beetle of the family Coccinellidae. It is only known from one specimen found in the mountains of Kashmir Fargabad in Gresh-Nul, close to the river Vardvan-Maru.

== Description ==
Adults reach a length of about 3.6 mm (0.14 in). They are similar to Priscibrumus uropygialis, but smaller, narrower, and much more finely punctate. They have a large, triangular apical elytral spot.
