= Oenopia excellens =

Scientific classification
- Kingdom: Animalia
- Phylum: Arthropoda
- Clade: Pancrustacea
- Class: Insecta
- Order: Coleoptera
- Suborder: Polyphaga
- Infraorder: Cucujiformia
- Family: Coccinellidae
- Genus: Oenopia
- Species: O. excellens

Binomial name
- Oenopia excellens (Crotch, 1874)

Synonyms
- Dysis excellens Crotch, 1874

Species of beetle

Oenopia excellens is a species of beetle of the family Coccinellidae. It is found in India (Assam, Nagaland), Vietnam, Cambodia, Myanmar and Laos.

== Description ==
Adults reach a length of about 2.88–3.06 mm (0.113–0.120 in). The head is black in females and yellow in males and the pronotum and elytra are dark pitchy brown to black.
