= Coelophora vesiculata =

Scientific classification
- Kingdom: Animalia
- Phylum: Arthropoda
- Clade: Pancrustacea
- Class: Insecta
- Order: Coleoptera
- Suborder: Polyphaga
- Infraorder: Cucujiformia
- Family: Coccinellidae
- Genus: Coelophora
- Species: C. vesiculata

Binomial name
- Coelophora vesiculata Chazeau, 1990

Species of beetle

Coelophora vesiculata is a species of beetle of the family Coccinellidae. It is found in Papua New Guinea and Indonesia (Western New Guinea, Biak).

== Description ==
Adults reach a length of about 4.7–5.3 mm (0.19–0.21 in). The head and antennae are orange or brown, and sometimes almost entirely black. The pronotum is orange with a large black medial area. The elytra are black with reddish or orange spots. The ventral surface is brown.
