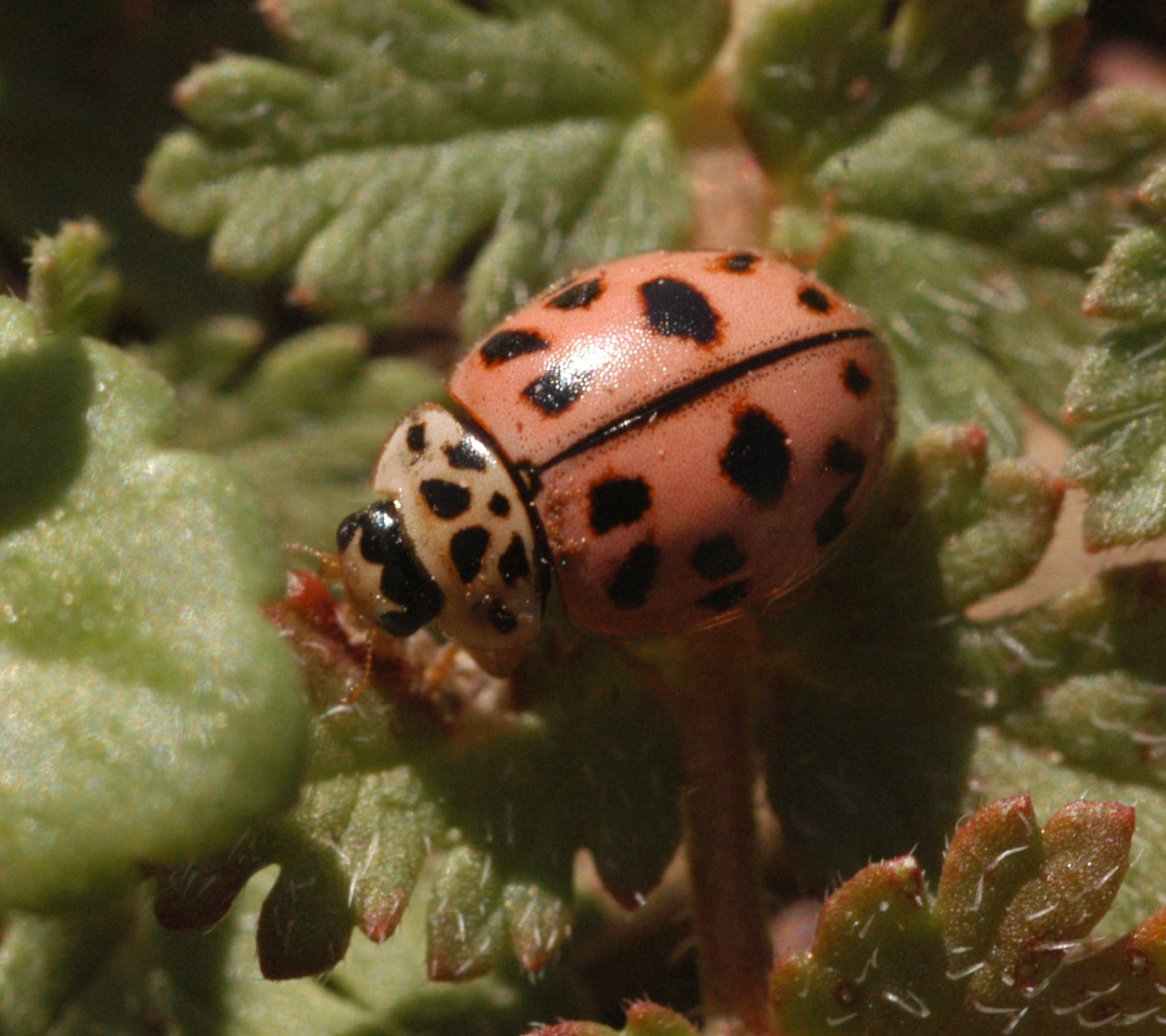

Scientific classification
- Kingdom: Animalia
- Phylum: Arthropoda
- Clade: Pancrustacea
- Class: Insecta
- Order: Coleoptera
- Suborder: Polyphaga
- Infraorder: Cucujiformia
- Family: Coccinellidae
- Genus: Oenopia
- Species: O. conglobata

Binomial name
- Oenopia conglobata (Linnaeus, 1758)

Synonyms
- Coccinella conglobata Linnaeus, 1758; Synharmonia conglobata afghana Bielawski, 1968; Coccinella octodecimpunctata Scopoli, 1763; Coccinella gemella Herbst, 1783; Coccinella sedecimmaculata Fabricius, 1787; Coccinella rosea De Geer, 1775; Coccinella undularis Panzer, 1798; Coccinella specularis Bonelli, 1812; Coccinella sedecimmaculata Thunberg, 1795; Coccinella maculosa Gorham, 1899; Coccinella conglobata var. houlberti Monnot, 1914; Synharmonia conglobata major Dobzhansky, 1927; Coccinella contaminata Ménétries, 1849; Coccinella octodecimpunctata var. desertorum Rybakow in Weise, 1889; Coccinella quatuordecimplagiata Ballion, 1871; Harmonia buphthalmus Mulsant, 1850; Synharmonia cashmirense Korschefsky, 1935

= Oenopia conglobata =

Species of beetle

Oenopia conglobata, the poplar ladybird, is a species of ladybird beetle (Coccinellidae) native to continental Europe, Asia and Africa.

== Description ==
The adult beetles are 3.5 to 5 mm long and have oval, slightly curved bodies. The elytra are light pink (more rarely red to pale yellow) with a black streak on the inner edges of the elytra, bearing eight square black spots varying in size and sometimes flowing into each other. There are also completely black specimens. The pronotum is light beige and bears seven black, symmetrically arranged spots. The head is black and white. The antennae are yellow, but slightly darker coloured at the end; the legs are yellow brown.

== Occurrence ==
Oenopia conglobata is found in mainland Europe except in the North, North Africa and the temperate regions of Asia. In Great Britain, it is a rare vagrant, with just four records to date, at Flamborough Head in Yorkshire in 2014, Lennoxtown near Glasgow in 2020, Ponteland in Northumberland in 2024, and Great Dunmow, Essex, in 2025. The origin of these records, being so widely spread, suggests at least some are accidental human introductions, rather than natural colonisation; the Lennoxtown record was on bananas indoors.

The species lives in mixed forests of the lower altitudes, being found mainly on poplar, pine, larch, and Prunus species such as bird cherries.

== Subspecies ==
- Oenopia conglobata conglobata
- Oenopia conglobata afghana (Bielawski, 1968)
- Oenopia conglobata contaminata (Ménétries, 1849)
- Oenopia conglobata kashmirensis (Korschefsky, 1935)

== Diet ==
Like most types of ladybirds, the adults and larvae of Oenopia conglobata eat aphids.

== Habits ==
The beetles overwinter on cemetery gravestones, and under the bark of trees, mostly poplars, elms, plane, oak and horse chestnut. The species has also been found resting between the panes of double-glazed windows.
