= Priscibrumus trijunctus =

Scientific classification
- Kingdom: Animalia
- Phylum: Arthropoda
- Clade: Pancrustacea
- Class: Insecta
- Order: Coleoptera
- Suborder: Polyphaga
- Infraorder: Cucujiformia
- Family: Coccinellidae
- Genus: Priscibrumus
- Species: P. trijunctus

Binomial name
- Priscibrumus trijunctus (Kapur, 1973)

Synonyms
- Exochomus trijunctus Kapur, 1973

Species of beetle

Priscibrumus trijunctus is a species of beetle of the family Coccinellidae. It is only known from the Karakoram range.

== Description ==
Adults reach a length of about 3.1 mm (0.12 in). They have a pubescent dorsum, black head and pronotum and reddish testaceous elytra. There are three black elytral vittae that become confluent near the apices.
