= Oenopia octovittata =

Scientific classification
- Kingdom: Animalia
- Phylum: Arthropoda
- Clade: Pancrustacea
- Class: Insecta
- Order: Coleoptera
- Suborder: Polyphaga
- Infraorder: Cucujiformia
- Family: Coccinellidae
- Genus: Oenopia
- Species: O. octovittata

Binomial name
- Oenopia octovittata Canepari, 2012

Species of beetle

Oenopia octovittata is a species of beetle of the family Coccinellidae. It is found in Nepal.

== Description ==
Adults reach a length of about 4–4.5 mm (0.16–0.18 in). The head is yellow with a black base and the pronotum is pale yellow with a black median macula. The scutellum is black and the elytra are red, each with four black spots and a black sutural stripe.
