= Oenopia adelgivora =

Scientific classification
- Kingdom: Animalia
- Phylum: Arthropoda
- Clade: Pancrustacea
- Class: Insecta
- Order: Coleoptera
- Suborder: Polyphaga
- Infraorder: Cucujiformia
- Family: Coccinellidae
- Genus: Oenopia
- Species: O. adelgivora

Binomial name
- Oenopia adelgivora Poorani, 2002

Species of beetle

Oenopia adelgivora is a species of beetle of the family Coccinellidae. It is found in India (Sikkim, West Bengal) and Bhutan.

== Description ==
Adults reach a length of about 3.4–4.1 mm (0.13–0.16 in). The dorsal surface is dull straw yellow, with a black head. The pronotum has one or two pairs of pale brown markings and the scutellum is black. The elytra have two dark brown to dull black stripes and a narrow sutural stripe.

== Life history ==
They have been recorded preying on Adelges species.
