= Coelophora atrolineata =

Scientific classification
- Kingdom: Animalia
- Phylum: Arthropoda
- Clade: Pancrustacea
- Class: Insecta
- Order: Coleoptera
- Suborder: Polyphaga
- Infraorder: Cucujiformia
- Family: Coccinellidae
- Genus: Coelophora
- Species: C. atrolineata

Binomial name
- Coelophora atrolineata Fairmaire, 1881

Species of ladybug

Coelophora atrolineata is a species of ladybug. It is found in Fiji.
