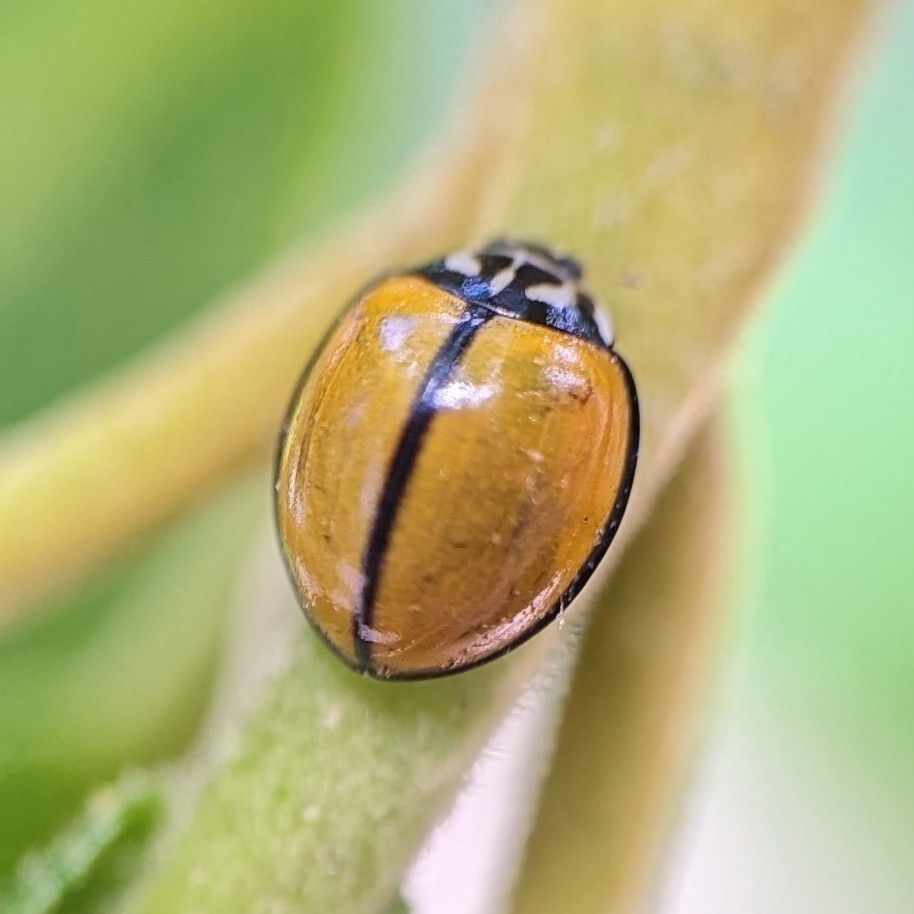

Scientific classification
- Kingdom: Animalia
- Phylum: Arthropoda
- Clade: Pancrustacea
- Class: Insecta
- Order: Coleoptera
- Suborder: Polyphaga
- Infraorder: Cucujiformia
- Family: Coccinellidae
- Genus: Oenopia
- Species: O. cuneata

Binomial name
- Oenopia cuneata (Thunberg, 1820)

Synonyms
- Coccinella cuneata Thunberg, 1820; Coccinella fimbriata Thunberg, 1781 (preocc.); Coccinella spicillum Thunberg, 1820; Oenopia cinctella Mulsant, 1850

= Oenopia cuneata =

Species of beetle

Oenopia cuneata is a species of beetle in the Coccinellidae family, known also as the blackring lady beetle.
