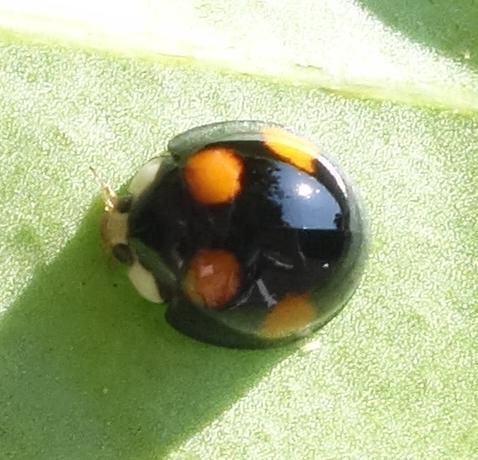

Scientific classification
- Kingdom: Animalia
- Phylum: Arthropoda
- Clade: Pancrustacea
- Class: Insecta
- Order: Coleoptera
- Suborder: Polyphaga
- Infraorder: Cucujiformia
- Family: Coccinellidae
- Genus: Coelophora
- Species: C. bowringii

Binomial name
- Coelophora bowringii Crotch, 1874

Synonyms
- Coelophora tanoi Sasaji, 1982

= Coelophora bowringii =

Species of ladybug

Coelophora bowringii is a species of ladybug native to India (Assam, Nagaland), Myanmar, southern China and Taiwan.

== Description ==
Adults reach a length of about 4.1–4.5 mm (0.16–0.18 in). They are yellowish orange to ochreous, with the head and anterolateral portions of the pronotum creamy yellow. Each elytron has four spots with yellowish-white halos.
