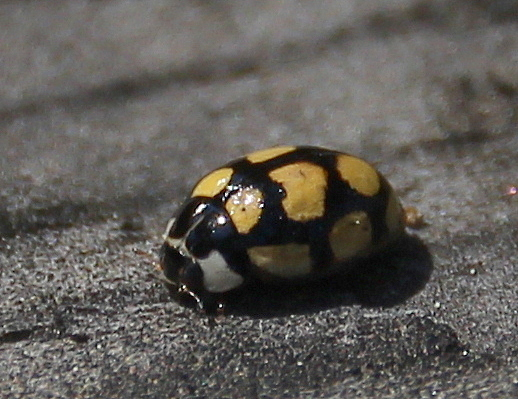

Scientific classification
- Kingdom: Animalia
- Phylum: Arthropoda
- Clade: Pancrustacea
- Class: Insecta
- Order: Coleoptera
- Suborder: Polyphaga
- Infraorder: Cucujiformia
- Family: Coccinellidae
- Genus: Oenopia
- Species: O. lyncea

Binomial name
- Oenopia lyncea (Olivier, 1808)

Synonyms
- Coccinella lyncea Olivier, 1808; Coccinella agnata Rosenhauer, 1847; Coccinella lyncea var. remota Weise, 1879; Coccinella lyncea var. pullata Weise, 1879; Coccinella duodecimpustulata Fabricius, 1777; Coccinella lyncea var. asiatica Weise, 1885; Harmonia lyncea var. weisei Sicard, 1891; Coccinella lyncea var. castiliana Weise, 1903

= Oenopia lyncea =

Species of beetle

Oenopia lyncea is a species of beetle in the family Coccinellidae. It is found in southwestern France and Portugal.

== Taxonomy ==
Oenopia lyncea contains the following subspecies:

- Oenopia lyncea agnata (Rosenhauer, 1847)
- Oenopia lyncea lyncea
