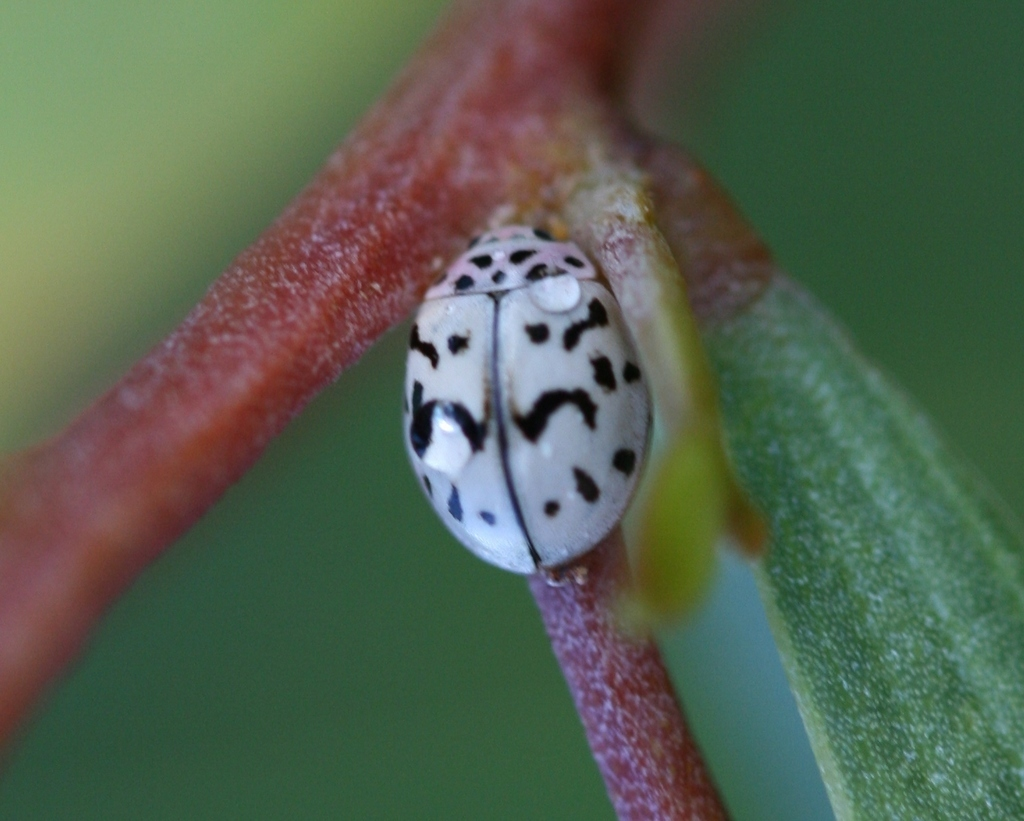

Scientific classification
- Kingdom: Animalia
- Phylum: Arthropoda
- Clade: Pancrustacea
- Class: Insecta
- Order: Coleoptera
- Suborder: Polyphaga
- Infraorder: Cucujiformia
- Family: Coccinellidae
- Genus: Oenopia
- Species: O. doublieri

Binomial name
- Oenopia doublieri (Mulsant, 1846)

Synonyms
- Harmonia doublieri Mulsant, 1846

= Oenopia doublieri =

Species of beetle

Oenopia doublieri is a species of beetle in the Coccinellidae family. It is found in the Mediterranean region, the Canary Islands, and the Atlantic coasts of France, Spain, and Portugal. It has also been found in the city of Neum in Bosnia and Herzegovina.

== Description ==
Oenopia doublieri are 4-5mm in length and slightly convex in shape, with coloration ranging from white to beige or pink. The pronotum has seven small black spots, while each elytron has eight spots, some of which are fused to form short lines.

== Habitat ==
In the Mediterranean basin, it is mostly found in lowland coniferous forests.
