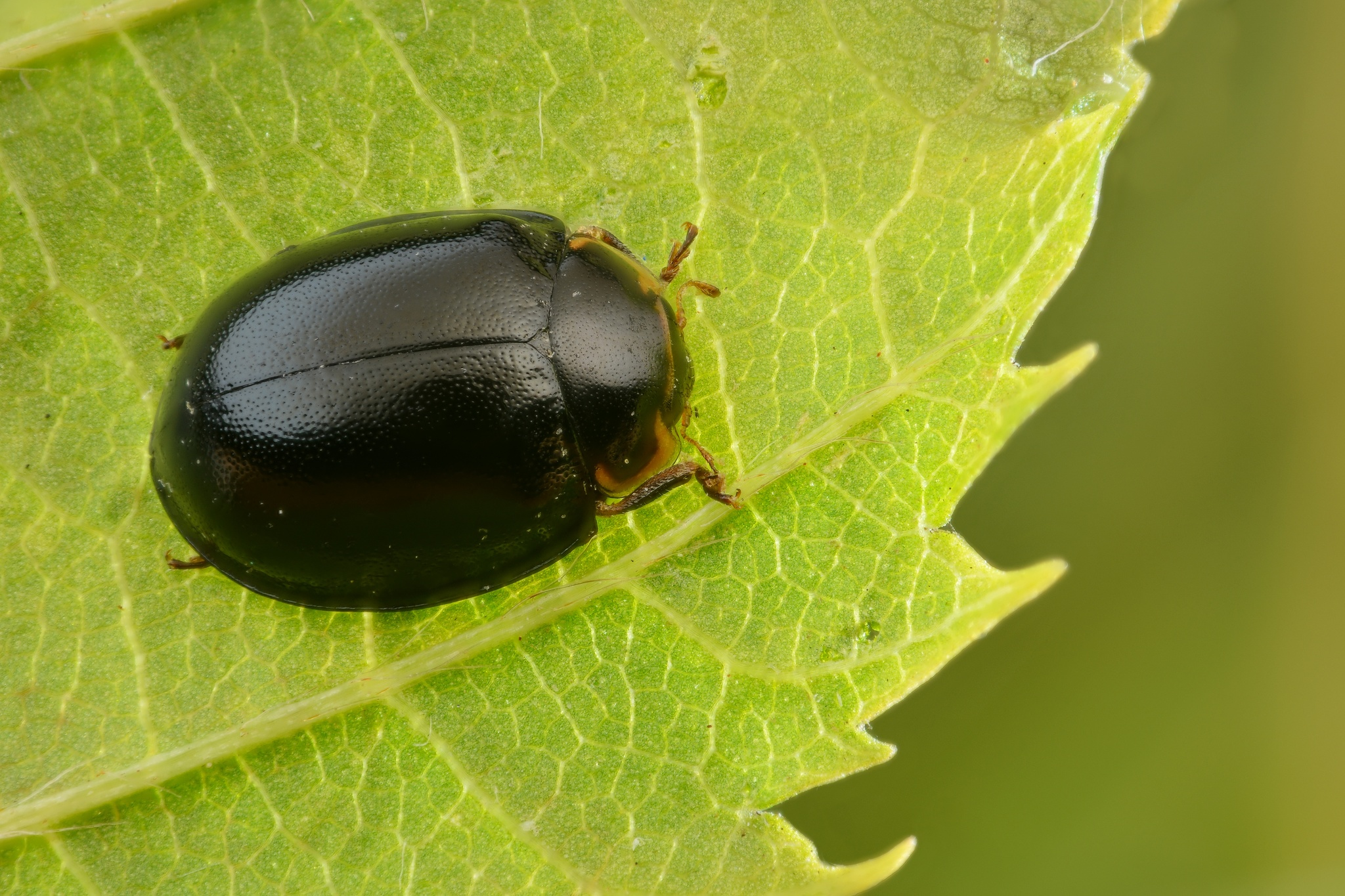

Scientific classification
- Kingdom: Animalia
- Phylum: Arthropoda
- Clade: Pancrustacea
- Class: Insecta
- Order: Coleoptera
- Suborder: Polyphaga
- Infraorder: Cucujiformia
- Family: Coccinellidae
- Genus: Oenopia
- Species: O. impustulata

Binomial name
- Oenopia impustulata (Linnaeus, 1767)

Synonyms
- Coccinella impustulata Linnaeus, 1767; Coccinella sedecimmaculata Fabricius, 1801; Coccinella vidua Olivier, 1808; Coccinella caucasica Motschulsky, 1837; Coccinella viridula Hampe, 1850; Halyzia conglobata var. nigra Croissandeau, 1887

= Oenopia impustulata =

Species of beetle

Oenopia impustulata is a species of beetle in the Coccinellidae family. It is found in France and rarely in Switzerland and other parts of Central Europe.

== Habitat ==
Oenopia impustulata beetles live in heath, sand, and bog areas.

== Ecology ==
Oenopia impustulata beetles feed almost exclusively on aphids found on birch trees, especially Betula pendula and Betula pubescens.
