= Coelophora pupillata =

Scientific classification
- Kingdom: Animalia
- Phylum: Arthropoda
- Clade: Pancrustacea
- Class: Insecta
- Order: Coleoptera
- Suborder: Polyphaga
- Infraorder: Cucujiformia
- Family: Coccinellidae
- Genus: Coelophora
- Species: C. pupillata

Binomial name
- Coelophora pupillata (Schwarz, 1808)

Synonyms
- Coccinella pupillata Schwarz in Schönherr, 1808

Species of ladybug

Coelophora pupillata, also known as the tenspotted lady beetle, is a species of ladybug native to the Hawaiian islands (Oahu, Maui and Hawaii), China and Java.
