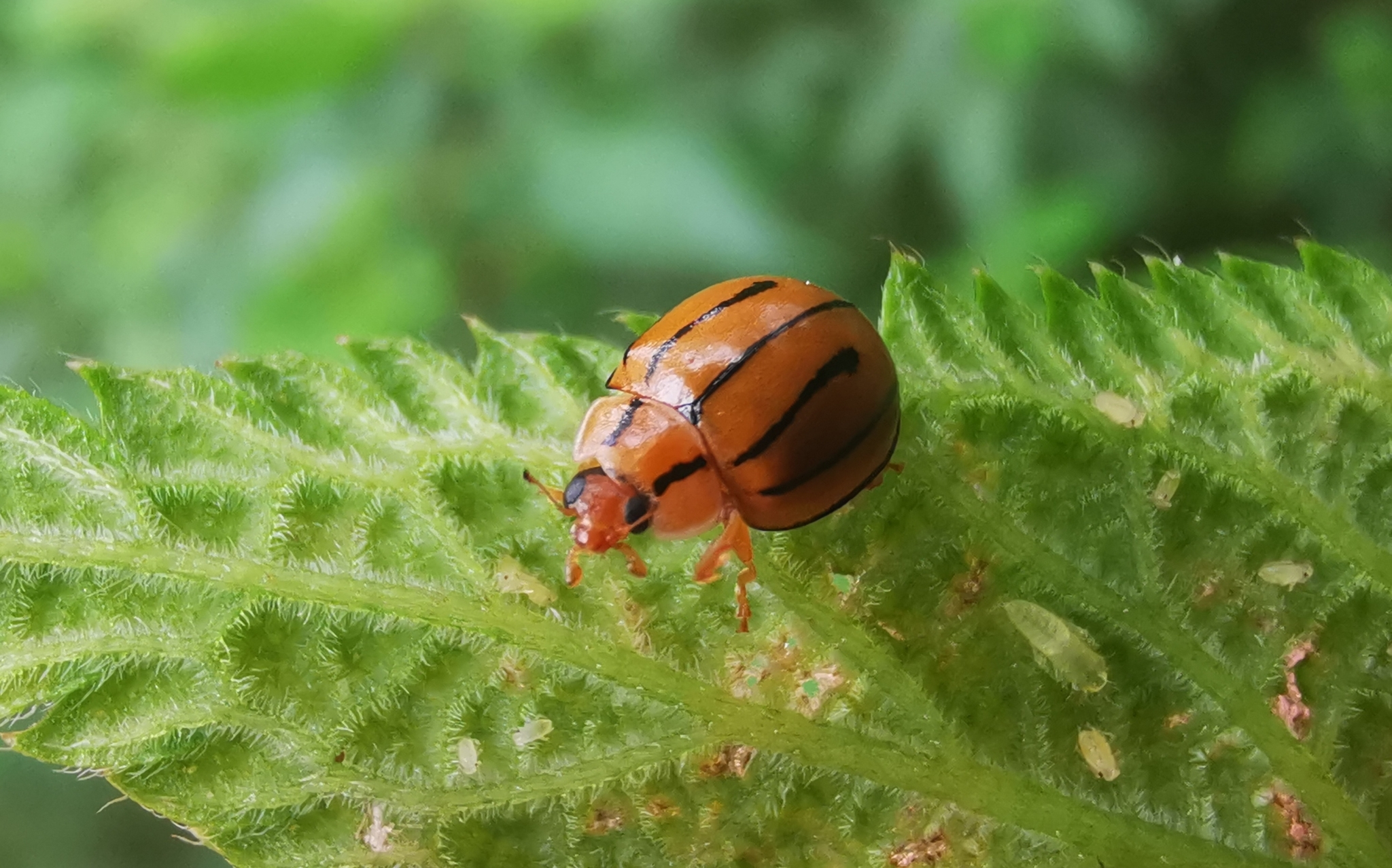

Scientific classification
- Kingdom: Animalia
- Phylum: Arthropoda
- Clade: Pancrustacea
- Class: Insecta
- Order: Coleoptera
- Suborder: Polyphaga
- Infraorder: Cucujiformia
- Family: Coccinellidae
- Genus: Coelophora
- Species: C. lushuiensis

Binomial name
- Coelophora lushuiensis (Jing, 1992)

Synonyms
- Lemnia lushuiensis Jing, 1992

= Coelophora lushuiensis =

Species of beetle

Coelophora lushuiensis is a species of beetle of the family Coccinellidae. It is found in India (Manipur), Laos, China and Taiwan.

== Description ==
Adults reach a length of about 5.1–5.7 mm (0.20–0.22 in). They are olive yellow, the pronotum with two ochreous to reddish brown longitudinal maculae. Each elytron has a macula on the basal margin and two thin stripes.
