= Coelophora minki =

Scientific classification
- Kingdom: Animalia
- Phylum: Arthropoda
- Clade: Pancrustacea
- Class: Insecta
- Order: Coleoptera
- Suborder: Polyphaga
- Infraorder: Cucujiformia
- Family: Coccinellidae
- Genus: Coelophora
- Species: C. minki

Binomial name
- Coelophora minki (Mulsant, 1866)

Synonyms
- Daulis minki Mulsant, 1866

Species of beetle

Coelophora minki is a species of beetle of the family Coccinellidae. It is found in Sri Lanka and Indonesia (Java).

== Description ==
Adults reach a length of about 7 mm (0.28 in). They are yellow-orange, the scutellum with dark brown borders and each elytron with six dark brown spots.
