= Coelophora duvaucelii =

Scientific classification
- Kingdom: Animalia
- Phylum: Arthropoda
- Clade: Pancrustacea
- Class: Insecta
- Order: Coleoptera
- Suborder: Polyphaga
- Infraorder: Cucujiformia
- Family: Coccinellidae
- Genus: Coelophora
- Species: C. duvaucelii

Binomial name
- Coelophora duvaucelii (Mulsant, 1850)

Synonyms
- Caria duvaucelii Mulsant, 1850; Coelophora placens Mulsant, 1853; Anisolemnia laichauana Hoang, 1983; Alloneda novemmaculata Cao & Pu, 1985

Species of ladybug

Coelophora duvaucelii is a species of ladybug. It is distributed in Asia including India, Bhutan, Myanmar, China, Vietnam, China, Indonesia, Malaysia and Laos.

== Description ==
Adults reach a length of about 7.5–8.4 mm (0.30–0.33 in). They are reddish to yellowish brown, the pronotum with two black spots on the basal margin. Each elytron has four black spots on the disk and one spot next to the suture.
