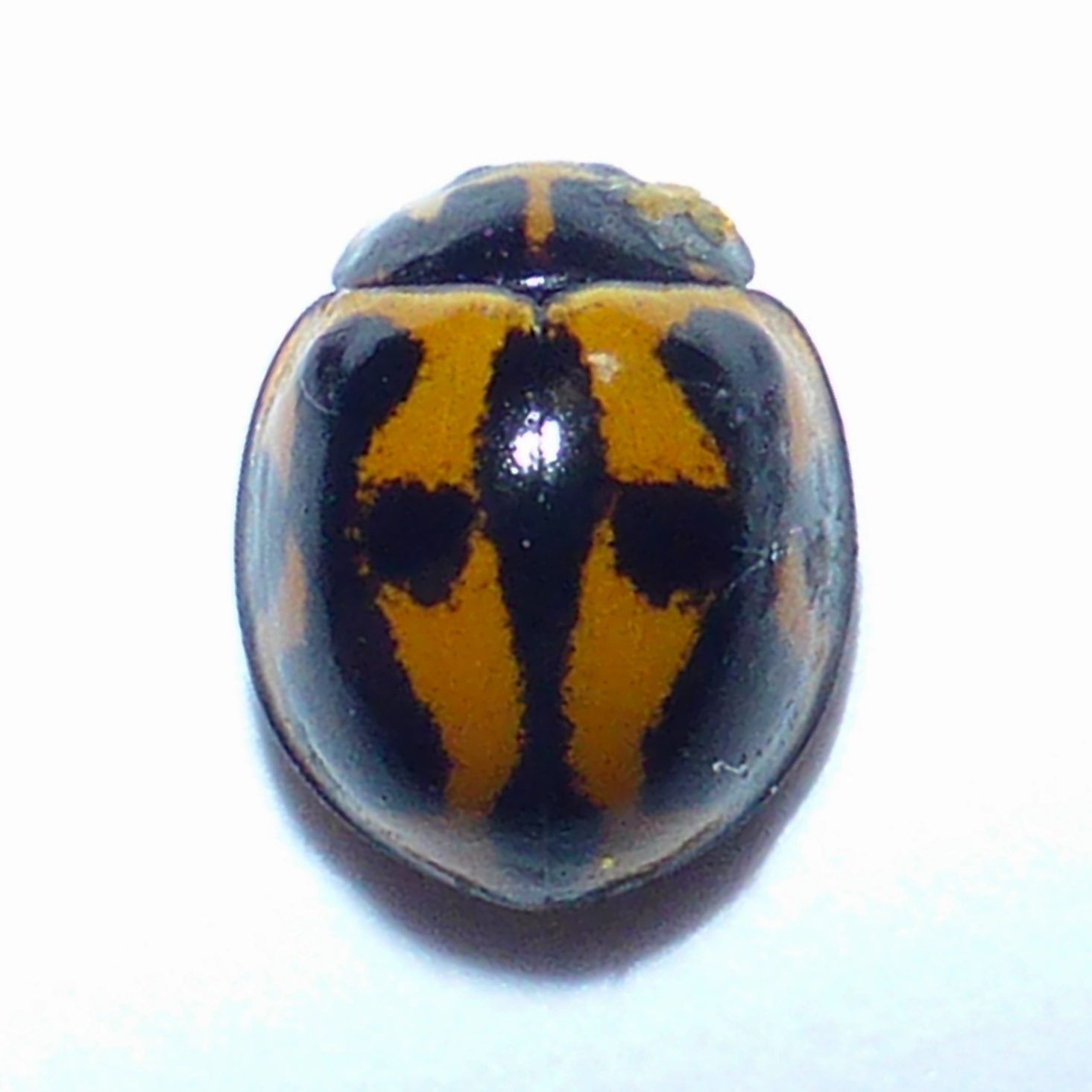

Scientific classification
- Kingdom: Animalia
- Phylum: Arthropoda
- Clade: Pancrustacea
- Class: Insecta
- Order: Coleoptera
- Suborder: Polyphaga
- Infraorder: Cucujiformia
- Family: Coccinellidae
- Genus: Coelophora
- Species: C. inaequalis

Binomial name
- Coelophora inaequalis (Fabricius, 1775)

Synonyms
- Coccinella inaequalis Fabricius, 1775; Coccinella novemmaculata Fabricius, 1781; Coccinella novempunctata Fabricius, 1775 (preocc.); Coccinella iridea Thunberg, 1781; Coccinella octonotata Fabricius, 1801; Coccinella psi Thunberg, 1781; Coccinella circularis Thunberg, 1820; Coccinella novemsignata Thunberg, 1820; Coccinella patruelis Boisduval, 1835; Coccinella musae Montrouzier, 1855; Lemnia desolata Mulsant, 1850; Coelophora reniplagiata Mulsant, 1850; Coelophora vidua Mulsant, 1850; Coelophora partita Mulsant, 1850; Coelophora symbolica Mulsant, 1856; Verania artensis Montrouzier, 1861; Coelophora flachati Mulsant, 1866; Coelophora mendica Mulsant, 1866; Coelophora ripponi Crotch, 1874; Coelophora mastersi Blackburn, 1892; Coelophora veranioides Blackburn, 1894; Coccinella religiosa Lea, 1902; Coelophora kochi Weise, 1912

= Coelophora inaequalis =

Species of beetle

Coelophora inaequalis, the variable ladybird, common Australian lady beetle or common Australian ladybug is a ladybird species endemic to Australia, Oceania and Southern Asia.

C. inaequalis was introduced into Florida and Hawaii as a biological control agent to combat Sipha flava, the yellow sugarcane aphid.

== Description ==
Adults reach a length of about 3.70-5.20 mm. The pronotum is yellow with a black area at the base. The elytron is yellow with four or five black spots.

== Etymology ==
The variable ladybird gets its name from the black markings on the adult elytra, that vary from one individual to another.
