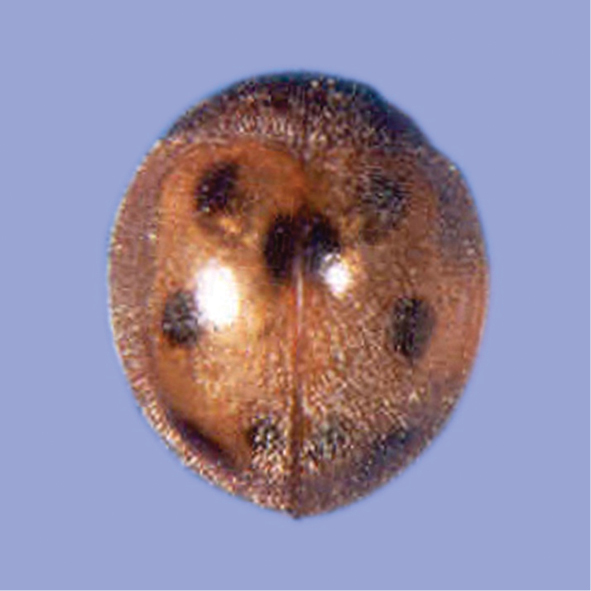
- Pharoscymnus flexibilis

Scientific classification
- Kingdom: Animalia
- Phylum: Arthropoda
- Clade: Pancrustacea
- Class: Insecta
- Order: Coleoptera
- Suborder: Polyphaga
- Infraorder: Cucujiformia
- Family: Coccinellidae
- Subfamily: Sticholotidinae
- Genus: Pharoscymnus; Bedel, 1906

= Pharoscymnus =

Genus of beetles

Pharoscymnus is a genus of lady beetles in the family Coccinellidae. There are about 11 described species in Pharoscymnus.

== Species ==
These 11 species belong to the genus Pharoscymnus:

- Pharoscymnus angohranensis Duverger, 1983
- Pharoscymnus arabicus Fuersch, 1979
- Pharoscymnus brunneosignatus Mader, 1949
- Pharoscymnus decemplagiatus (Wollaston, 1857)
- Pharoscymnus fleischeri (Weise, 1883)
- Pharoscymnus flexibilis (Mulsant, 1853)
- Pharoscymnus grandcanariensis Uyttenboogart, 1935
- Pharoscymnus ovoideus Sicard, 1929
- Pharoscymnus pharoides Marseul, 1868
- Pharoscymnus setulosus (Chevrolat, 1861)
- Pharoscymnus taoi Sasaji, 1967
