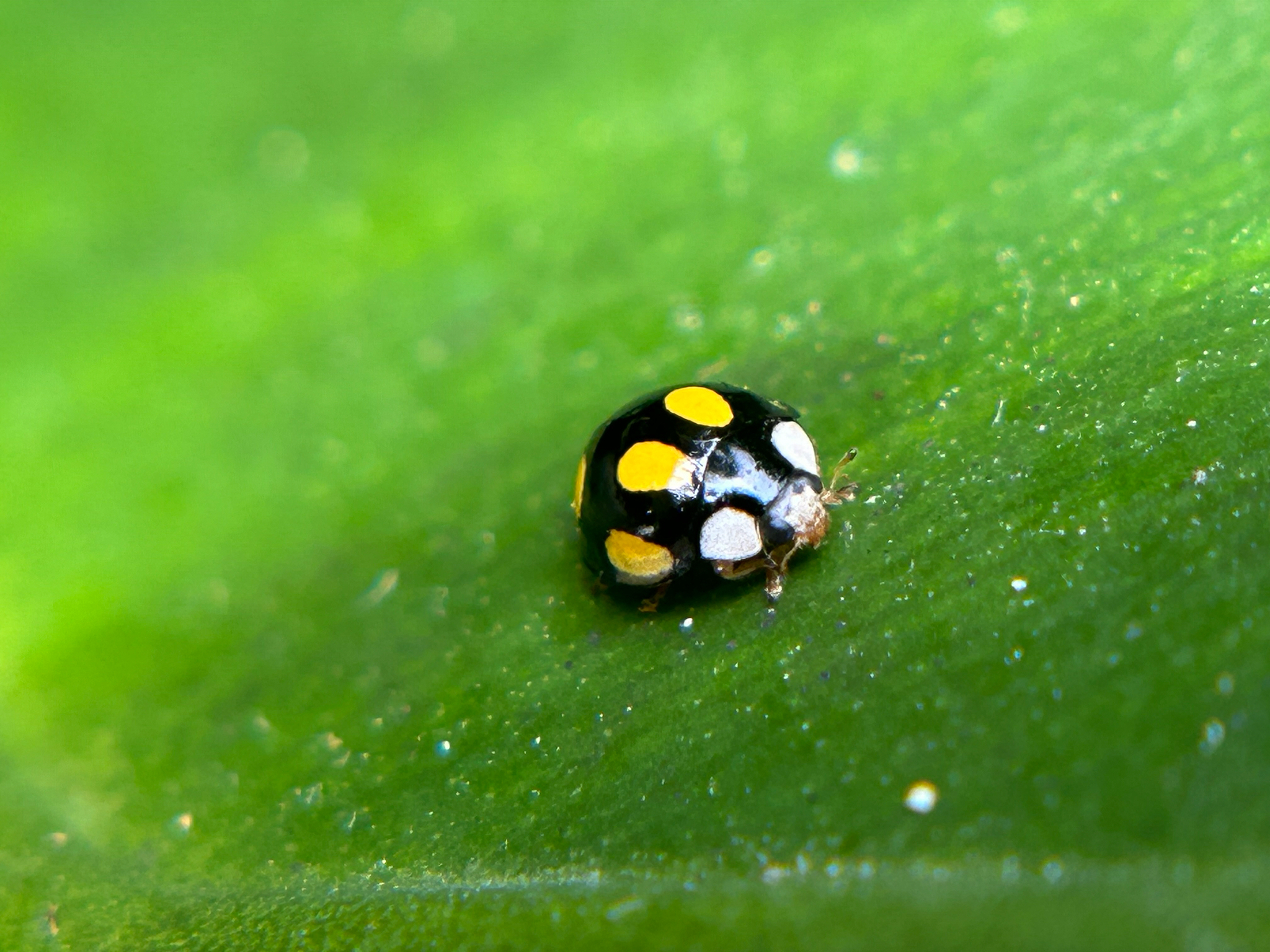

Scientific classification
- Kingdom: Animalia
- Phylum: Arthropoda
- Clade: Pancrustacea
- Class: Insecta
- Order: Coleoptera
- Suborder: Polyphaga
- Infraorder: Cucujiformia
- Family: Coccinellidae
- Genus: Oenopia
- Species: O. formosana

Binomial name
- Oenopia formosana (Miyatake, 1965)

Synonyms
- Gyrocaria formosana Miyatake, 1965

= Oenopia formosana =

Species of beetle

Oenopia formosana is a species of beetle in the family Coccinellidae. It is endemic to Taiwan.

== Description ==
Adult Oenopia formosana beetles are approximately 0.33–0.43 cm (0.13–0.17 in) in length. Females and males can be differentiated by the coloration of the head, with females having black heads while males have yellow heads. The pronotum is black with white oval markings on either side. The elytra are shiny and black, with three yellow spots on each elytron.

== Habitat ==
Oenopia formosana beetles can be found in the plains and low-mid-level mountains of Taiwan, where they are often found among grass and bushes.
