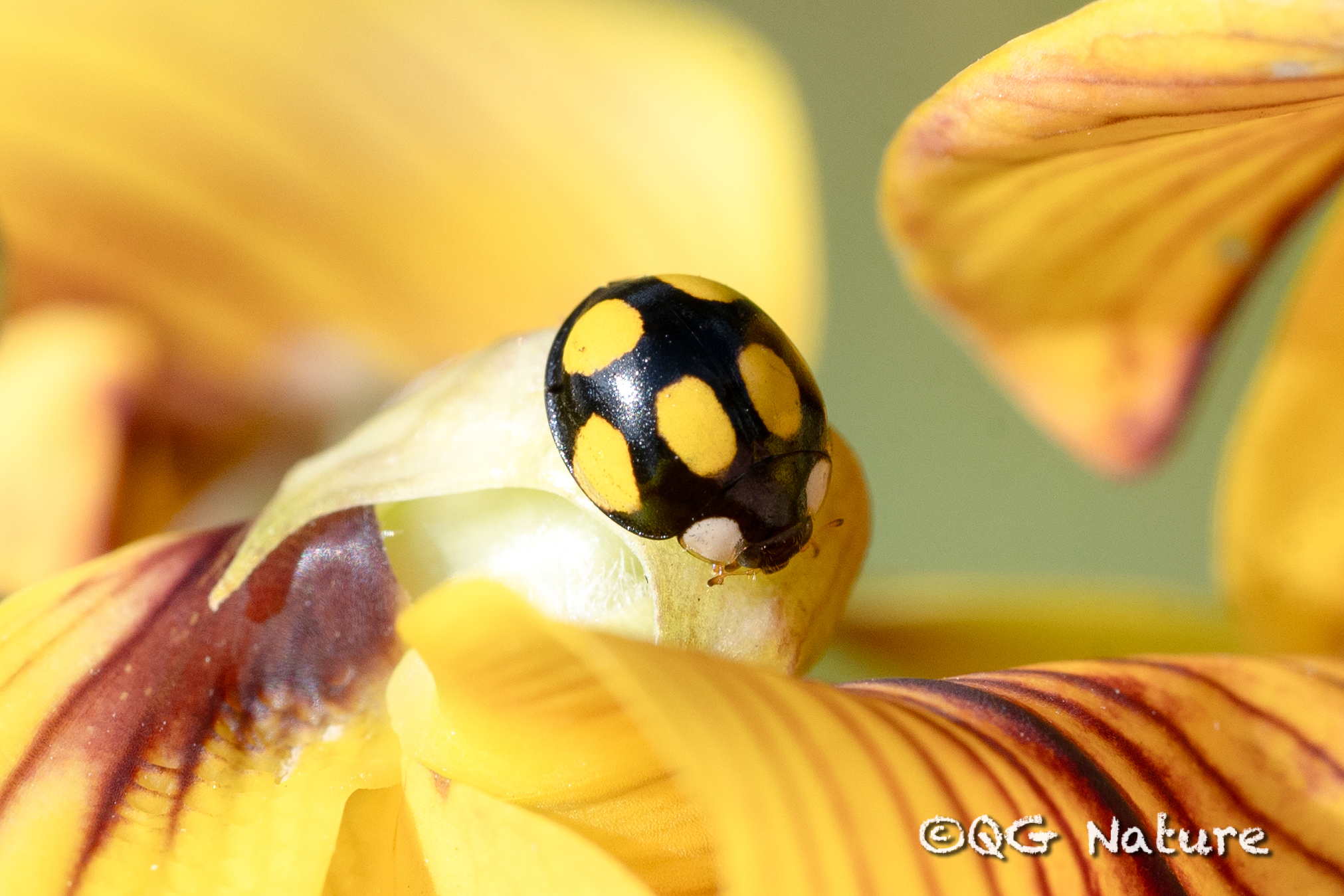

Scientific classification
- Kingdom: Animalia
- Phylum: Arthropoda
- Clade: Pancrustacea
- Class: Insecta
- Order: Coleoptera
- Suborder: Polyphaga
- Infraorder: Cucujiformia
- Family: Coccinellidae
- Genus: Oenopia
- Species: O. chinensis

Binomial name
- Oenopia chinensis (Weise, 1912)

Synonyms
- Coelophora chinensis Weise, 1913; Coelophora fallaciosa Mader, 1955

= Oenopia chinensis =

Species of beetle

Oenopia chinensis is a species of beetle in the Coccinellidae family. It is found in India (Arunachal Pradesh, Meghalaya), Laos, Vietnam and China.

== Description ==
Adults reach a length of about 3.5–4 mm (0.14–0.16 in). The head is yellow in males and black in females, while the pronotum is black with yellow lateral flanks. The elytra are black, each with three yellow spots.
