= Singhikalia duodecimguttata =

Scientific classification
- Kingdom: Animalia
- Phylum: Arthropoda
- Clade: Pancrustacea
- Class: Insecta
- Order: Coleoptera
- Suborder: Polyphaga
- Infraorder: Cucujiformia
- Family: Coccinellidae
- Genus: Singhikalia
- Species: S. duodecimguttata

Binomial name
- Singhikalia duodecimguttata Xiao, 1992

Species of beetle

Singhikalia duodecimguttata is a species of beetle of the family Coccinellidae. It is found in Pakistan and China.

== Description ==
Adults reach a length of about 6.9–8.4 mm (0.27–0.33 in). They are reddish, with the pronotum black laterally and with a two black maculae on the posterior margin. Each elytron has five black discal spots, one smaller elongate oval spot and one smaller apical spot.

== Life history ==
They have been recorded preying on aphids.
