= Coelophora decemguttata =

Scientific classification
- Kingdom: Animalia
- Phylum: Arthropoda
- Clade: Pancrustacea
- Class: Insecta
- Order: Coleoptera
- Suborder: Polyphaga
- Infraorder: Cucujiformia
- Family: Coccinellidae
- Genus: Coelophora
- Species: C. decemguttata

Binomial name
- Coelophora decemguttata Weise, 1913

Synonyms
- Phrynocaria decemguttata

Species of beetle

Coelophora decemguttata is a species of beetle of the family Coccinellidae. It is found in India (Sikkim, West Bengal).

== Description ==
Adults reach a length of about 5.8–6.3 mm (0.23–0.25 in). The head is yellow and the pronotum is yellow with a median black macula. The scutellum is black with a yellow basal margin. Each elytron has five spots and yellowish lateral margins.
