= Priscibrumus puniceipennis =

Scientific classification
- Kingdom: Animalia
- Phylum: Arthropoda
- Clade: Pancrustacea
- Class: Insecta
- Order: Coleoptera
- Suborder: Polyphaga
- Infraorder: Cucujiformia
- Family: Coccinellidae
- Genus: Priscibrumus
- Species: P. puniceipennis

Binomial name
- Priscibrumus puniceipennis (Semenov, 1900)

Synonyms
- Exochomus puniceipennis Semenov, 1900

Species of beetle

Priscibrumus puniceipennis is a species of beetle of the family Coccinellidae. It is found in Tajikistan.
