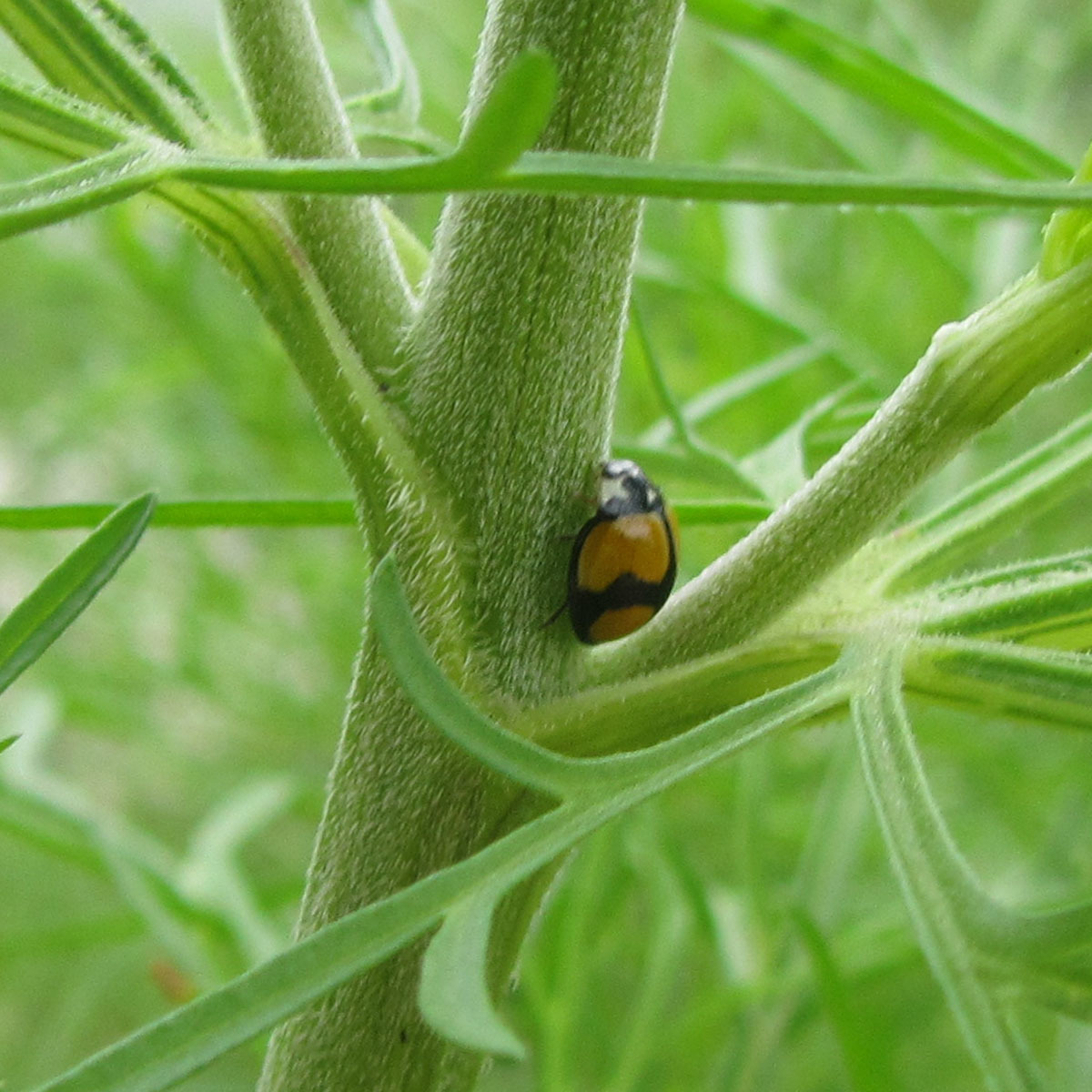

Scientific classification
- Kingdom: Animalia
- Phylum: Arthropoda
- Clade: Pancrustacea
- Class: Insecta
- Order: Coleoptera
- Suborder: Polyphaga
- Infraorder: Cucujiformia
- Family: Coccinellidae
- Genus: Oenopia
- Species: O. guerini

Binomial name
- Oenopia guerini Mulsant, 1850

Synonyms
- Alesia guerini Mulsant, 1850; Coelophora walteri Sicard, 1913

= Oenopia guerini =

Species of beetle

Oenopia guerini is a species of beetle in the family Coccinellidae. It is found in India (Himachal Pradesh, Kerala, Tamil Nadu). Though initially thought to be of the genus Micraspis, it was later transferred to the Oenopia genus in 2023.

== Description ==
Adults reach a length of about 3.25–3.75 mm (0.128–0.148 in). The head is yellow in males, and with a longitudinal black band in females. The pronotum is yellow with a black band and two median spots. The elytra are yellow with an anchor-shaped black marking and black margins.
