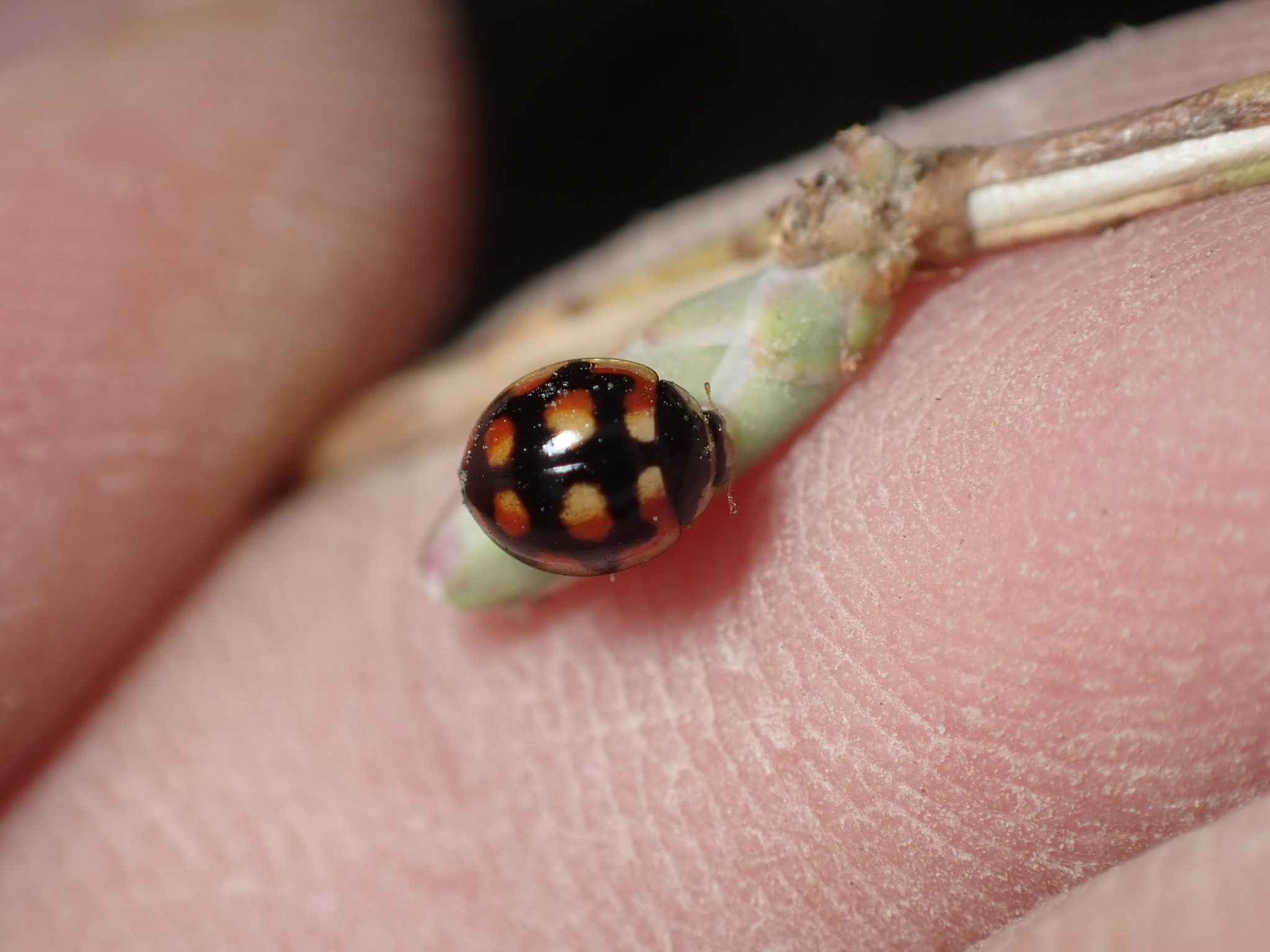

Scientific classification
- Kingdom: Animalia
- Phylum: Arthropoda
- Clade: Pancrustacea
- Class: Insecta
- Order: Coleoptera
- Suborder: Polyphaga
- Infraorder: Cucujiformia
- Family: Coccinellidae
- Genus: Oenopia
- Species: O. oncina

Binomial name
- Oenopia oncina (Olivier, 1808)

Synonyms
- Coccinella oncina Olivier, 1808; Coccinella persica Faldermann, 1837; Oenopia addicta Mulsant, 1850

= Oenopia oncina =

Species of beetle

Oenopia oncina is a species of beetle in the Coccinellidae family. It is found widely throughout the Middle East, Eastern Europe, and in Egypt.
