= Oenopia guttata =

Scientific classification
- Kingdom: Animalia
- Phylum: Arthropoda
- Clade: Pancrustacea
- Class: Insecta
- Order: Coleoptera
- Suborder: Polyphaga
- Infraorder: Cucujiformia
- Family: Coccinellidae
- Genus: Oenopia
- Species: O. guttata

Binomial name
- Oenopia guttata (Blackburn, 1892)

Synonyms
- Coelophora guttata Blackburn, 1892; Gyrocaria minuta Bielawski, 1964

Species of beetle

Oenopia guttata is a species of beetle of the family Coccinellidae. It is found in Papua New Guinea, the Solomon Islands and Australia (northern Queensland).

== Description ==
Adults reach a length of about 3.5–4 mm (0.14–0.16 in). The head is yellow in males and mostly black in females. The medial area of the pronotum is black, while the rest is yellow. The scutellum and elytra are black, the latter each with two patches.
