= Subepilachna =

Scientific classification
- Kingdom: Animalia
- Phylum: Arthropoda
- Clade: Pancrustacea
- Class: Insecta
- Order: Coleoptera
- Suborder: Polyphaga
- Infraorder: Cucujiformia
- Family: Coccinellidae
- Subfamily: Coccinellinae
- Tribe: Coccinellini
- Genus: Subepilachna; Bielawski, 1963
- Species: S. latemarginata

Binomial name
- Subepilachna latemarginata Bielawski, 1963

Synonyms
- Singhikalia latemarginata

Genus of beetles

Subepilachna is a genus of beetle of the family Coccinellidae. It is monotypic, being represented by the single species, Subepilachna latemarginata, which is found in Papua New Guinea.

== Description ==
Adults reach a length of about 7.1–7.9 mm (0.28–0.31 in). The frons is yellow with a median black area in males, while it is mostly black with a yellow area laterally in females. The antennae are brown and the pronotum is black with two yellow spots. The scutellum, elytra and abdomen are black. The dorsal surface is covered by white or yellowish hair.

== Taxonomy ==
Jadwiszczak synonymised Subepilachna with Singhikalia in 1990. However, the genus was reinstated as a valid genus by Ślipiński, Li and Pang in 2020.
