= Priscibrumus himalayensis =

Scientific classification
- Kingdom: Animalia
- Phylum: Arthropoda
- Clade: Pancrustacea
- Class: Insecta
- Order: Coleoptera
- Suborder: Polyphaga
- Infraorder: Cucujiformia
- Family: Coccinellidae
- Genus: Priscibrumus
- Species: P. himalayensis

Binomial name
- Priscibrumus himalayensis (Kapur, 1958)

Synonyms
- Exochomus himalayensis Kapur, 1958

Species of beetle

Priscibrumus himalayensis is a species of beetle of the family Coccinellidae. It is found in the Himalayas of Nepal.

== Description ==
Adults reach a length of about 3–3.2 mm (0.12–0.13 in). The head, pronotum and scutellum are black, while the elytra are reddish-testaceous, each elytron with a black dorsolateral band.
