= Priscibrumus lituratus =

Scientific classification
- Kingdom: Animalia
- Phylum: Arthropoda
- Clade: Pancrustacea
- Class: Insecta
- Order: Coleoptera
- Suborder: Polyphaga
- Infraorder: Cucujiformia
- Family: Coccinellidae
- Genus: Priscibrumus
- Species: P. lituratus

Binomial name
- Priscibrumus lituratus (Gorham, 1894)

Synonyms
- Exochomus lituratus Gorham, 1894

Species of beetle

Priscibrumus lituratus is a species of beetle of the family Coccinellidae. It is found in India (Himachal Pradesh, Jammu & Kashmir, Sikkim, Uttarakhand, Uttar Pradesh), Pakistan and Nepal.

== Description ==
Adults reach a length of about 4.14–4.56 mm (0.163–0.180 in). The head and pronotum are dull fuscous black, while the elytra are dull ferrugineous to ochreous yellow, with two lateral black stripes.

== Life history ==
They have been recorded preying on Adelges, Salicicola and Aphis species, as well as Dreyfusia knucheli and Dioryctria abietella.
