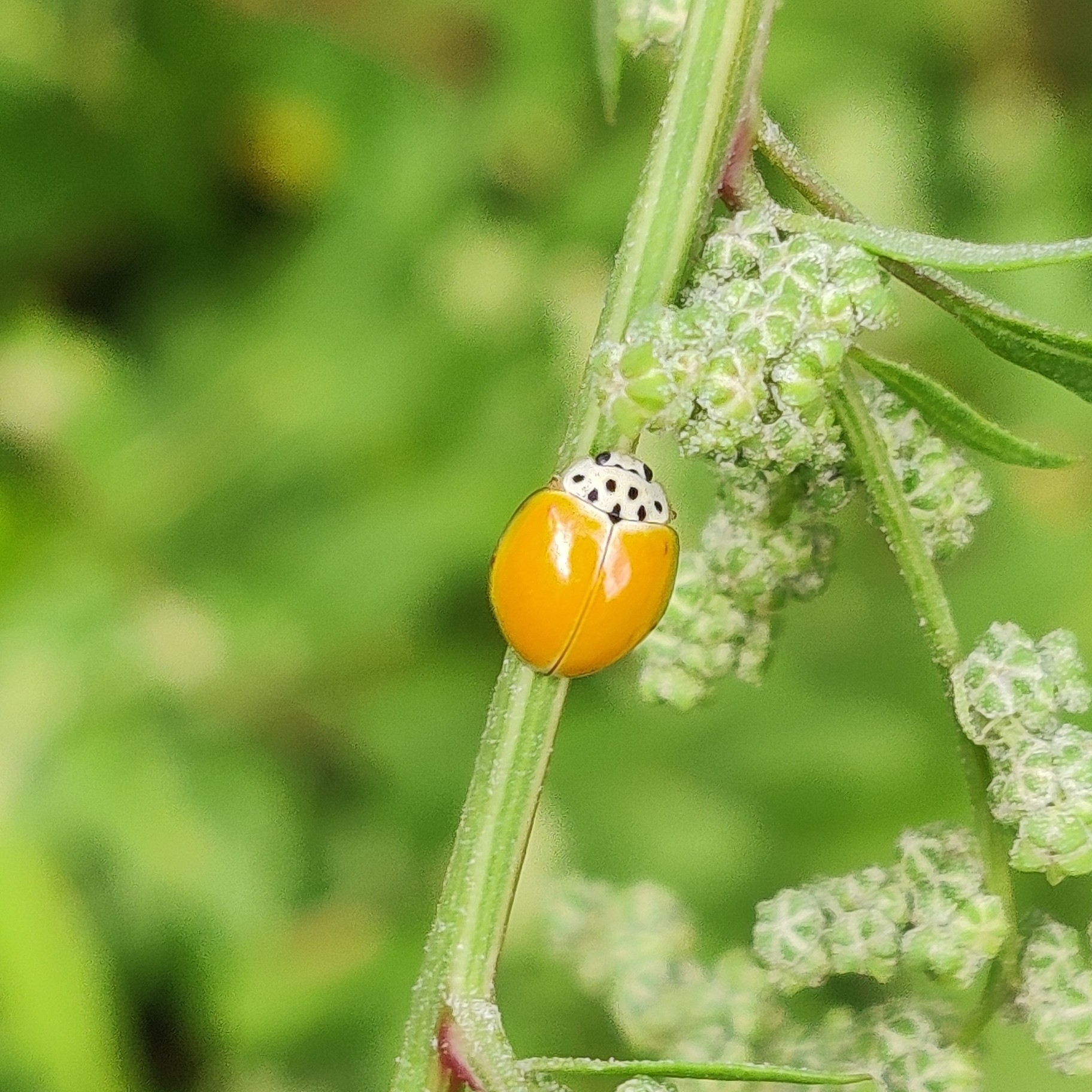

Scientific classification
- Kingdom: Animalia
- Phylum: Arthropoda
- Clade: Pancrustacea
- Class: Insecta
- Order: Coleoptera
- Suborder: Polyphaga
- Infraorder: Cucujiformia
- Family: Coccinellidae
- Genus: Oenopia
- Species: O. signatella

Binomial name
- Oenopia signatella (Mulsant, 1866)

Synonyms
- Harmonia signatella Mulsant, 1866; Paramulsantina gratiosa Hoang, 1982; Paramulsantina ornata Hoang, 1982

= Oenopia signatella =

Species of beetle

Oenopia signatella is a species of beetle in the family Coccinellidae. It is found in Northern India, Myanmar, and Nepal.

== Description ==
Oenopia signatella beetles are 4.3-4.8 mm in length. Its body is oval in shape and slightly convex. The ground color of the head and pronotum are whitish creamy yellow, while the elytra are creamy yellow. The pronotum has seven black spots which roughly form a W-shape.
