= Novius octoguttata =

Scientific classification
- Kingdom: Animalia
- Phylum: Arthropoda
- Class: Insecta
- Order: Coleoptera
- Suborder: Polyphaga
- Infraorder: Cucujiformia
- Family: Coccinellidae
- Genus: Novius
- Species: N. octoguttata

Binomial name
- Novius octoguttata (Weise, 1910)

Synonyms
- Rodolia octoguttata Weise, 1910

Species of beetle

Novius octoguttata is a species of lady beetle native to India, Sri Lanka, Pakistan, Myanmar and China.

== Description ==
Body length is about 4.0 to 4.8 mm. Body oval, and slightly convex. The dorsum is clothed heavily with white pubescence. Head, antennae and mouthpart are light brown in color. Eye are large. Pronotum reddish brown whereas scutellum is brown. Scutellum without any marking. Elytra reddish to reddish brown in color. In each elytron, there are four small black spots. Prosternum, mesoventrite and metaventrite are brownish to dark brown. Prosternum is narrow and raised anteriorly. Legs are brown. Head finely punctured. Elytra covered with coarse punctures. Prosternal carinae is absent.

== Biology ==
It is a predator of Drosicha mangiferae and the recorded host plants are Eriobotrya japonica, Alstonia scholaris, Lagerstroemia indica, Mangifera indica and Dalbergia sissoo.
