= Priscibrumus =

Scientific classification
- Kingdom: Animalia
- Phylum: Arthropoda
- Clade: Pancrustacea
- Class: Insecta
- Order: Coleoptera
- Suborder: Polyphaga
- Infraorder: Cucujiformia
- Family: Coccinellidae
- Subfamily: Coccinellinae
- Tribe: Chilocorini
- Genus: Priscibrumus; Kovář, 1995

Genus of beetles

Priscibrumus is a genus of beetles belonging to the family Coccinellidae.

== Species ==
- Priscibrumus disjunctus
- Priscibrumus himalayensis
- Priscibrumus lituratus
- Priscibrumus puniceipennis
- Priscibrumus trijunctus
- Priscibrumus trubetzkoi
- Priscibrumus uropygialis

== Etymology ==
The genus name is derived from latin priscus (meaning former, ancient) and the genus name Brumus.
