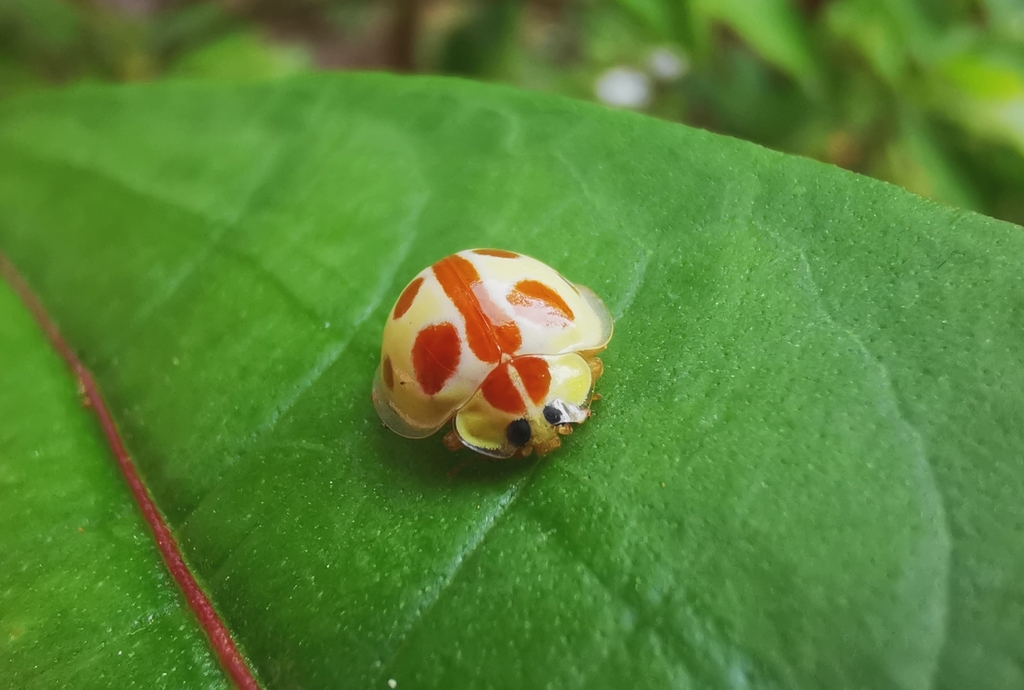

Scientific classification
- Kingdom: Animalia
- Phylum: Arthropoda
- Clade: Pancrustacea
- Class: Insecta
- Order: Coleoptera
- Suborder: Polyphaga
- Infraorder: Cucujiformia
- Family: Coccinellidae
- Genus: Halyzia
- Species: H. straminea

Binomial name
- Halyzia straminea (Hope, 1831)

Synonyms
- Coccinella straminea Hope, 1831

= Halyzia straminea =

Species of beetle

Halyzia straminea is a species of beetle of the family Coccinellidae. It is found in India (Andaman Islands, Assam, Arunachal Pradesh, Himachal Pradesh, Meghalaya, Nagaland, Sikkim, West Bengal), Nepal, Bhutan, China, Taiwan and Tibet.

== Description ==
Adults reach a length of about 6.84–8.05 mm (0.269–0.317 in). The head, pronotum and elytra are bright creamy yellow to lemon yellow. The pronotum has two dull brown to reddish brown spots on posterior margin and each elytron has four ochreous or reddish-brown spots. The elytral suture has a dull brown to reddish brown stripe and the lateral sides of the pronotum and elytra are transparent.
