= Scymnus victoris =

Scientific classification
- Kingdom: Animalia
- Phylum: Arthropoda
- Clade: Pancrustacea
- Class: Insecta
- Order: Coleoptera
- Suborder: Polyphaga
- Infraorder: Cucujiformia
- Family: Coccinellidae
- Genus: Scymnus
- Species: S. victoris

Binomial name
- Scymnus victoris Motschoulsky, 1858

Species of beetle

Scymnus (Pullus) victoris, is a species of lady beetle found in India, Nicobare Islands, Himalayas, Sri Lanka, and Philippines.

Three subspecies identified.

- Scymnus victoris unimaculata Korschefsky, 1934
- Scymnus victoris uninotata (Gorham, 1894)
- Scymnus victoris victoris Motschoulsky, 1858
