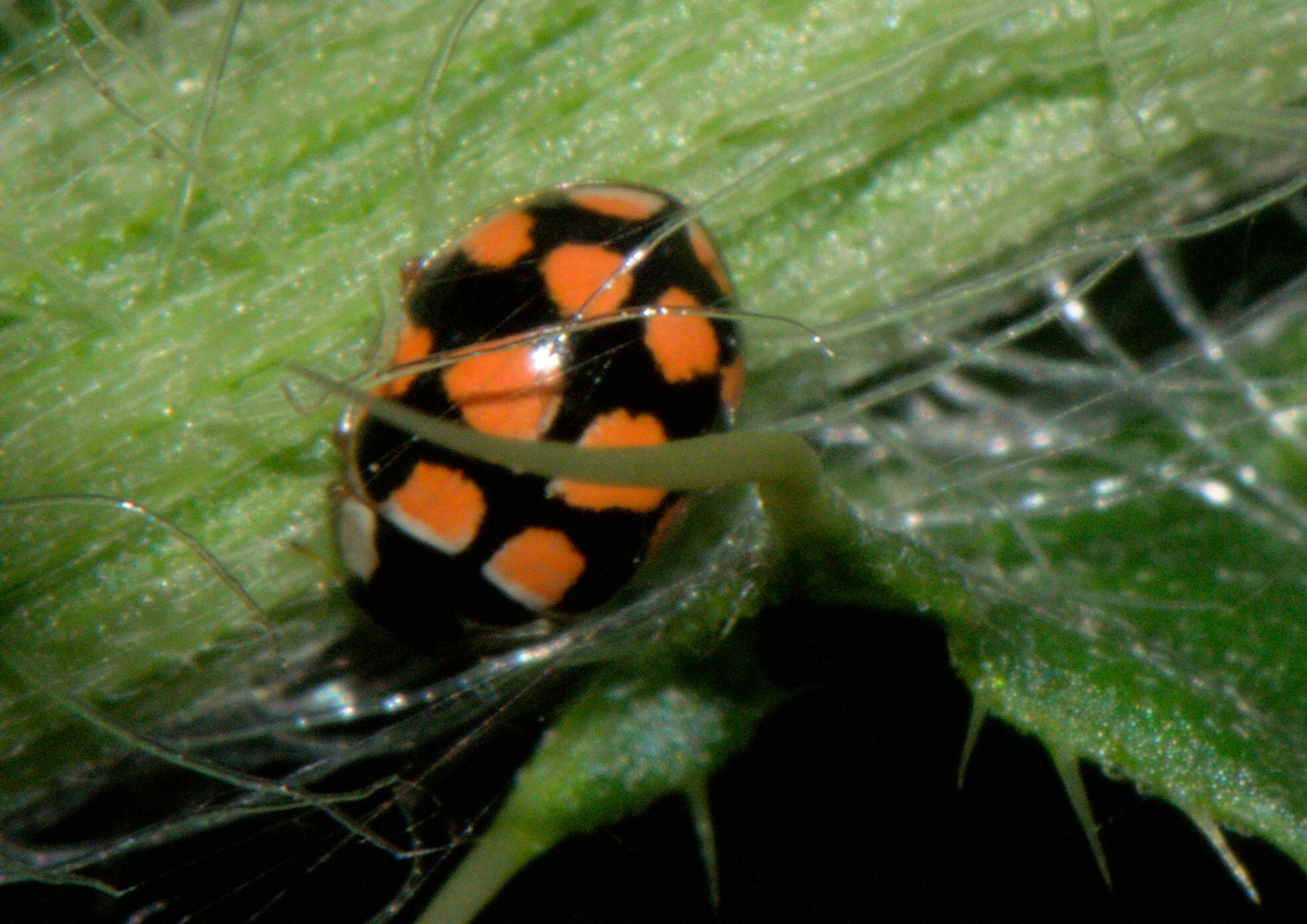

Scientific classification
- Kingdom: Animalia
- Phylum: Arthropoda
- Clade: Pancrustacea
- Class: Insecta
- Order: Coleoptera
- Suborder: Polyphaga
- Infraorder: Cucujiformia
- Family: Coccinellidae
- Genus: Oenopia
- Species: O. billieti

Binomial name
- Oenopia billieti (Mulsant, 1853)

Synonyms
- Harmonia billieti Mulsant, 1853; Coccinella transgressa Mulsant, 1853; Adalia indica Crotch, 1874; Propylea kehamae Crotch, 1874; Synharmonia flava Fürsch, 1960; Oenopia flavidbrunna Jing, 1986; Oenopia lanpingensis Jing, 1992; Oenopia pomiensis Jing, 1987; Oenopia gonggarensis Jing, 1992; Oenopia picithoroxa Jing, 1992

= Oenopia billieti =

Species of beetle

Oenopia billieti is a species of beetle in the Coccinellidae family. It is found in Northern India, Tibet, and Nepal.

== Description ==
Adults reach a length of about 3–4.15 mm (0.118–0.163 in). They are yellowish testaceous with black markings on the head, pronotum and elytra.

== Life history ==
They have been recorded preying on Adelges species, as well as aphids (including Brachycaudus helichrysi).
