= Oenopia smetanai =

Scientific classification
- Kingdom: Animalia
- Phylum: Arthropoda
- Clade: Pancrustacea
- Class: Insecta
- Order: Coleoptera
- Suborder: Polyphaga
- Infraorder: Cucujiformia
- Family: Coccinellidae
- Genus: Oenopia
- Species: O. smetanai

Binomial name
- Oenopia smetanai Canepari, 1997

Species of beetle

Oenopia smetanai is a species of beetle of the family Coccinellidae. It is found in India (Uttarakhand), Nepal and Bhutan.

== Description ==
Adults reach a length of about 2.5–3 mm (0.098–0.118 in). They are pale creamy yellow, the pronotum with two median black spots. The scutellum is black and the elytra have a vase-shaped sutural macula and three black spots on each elytron, although the elytral pattern may vary.
