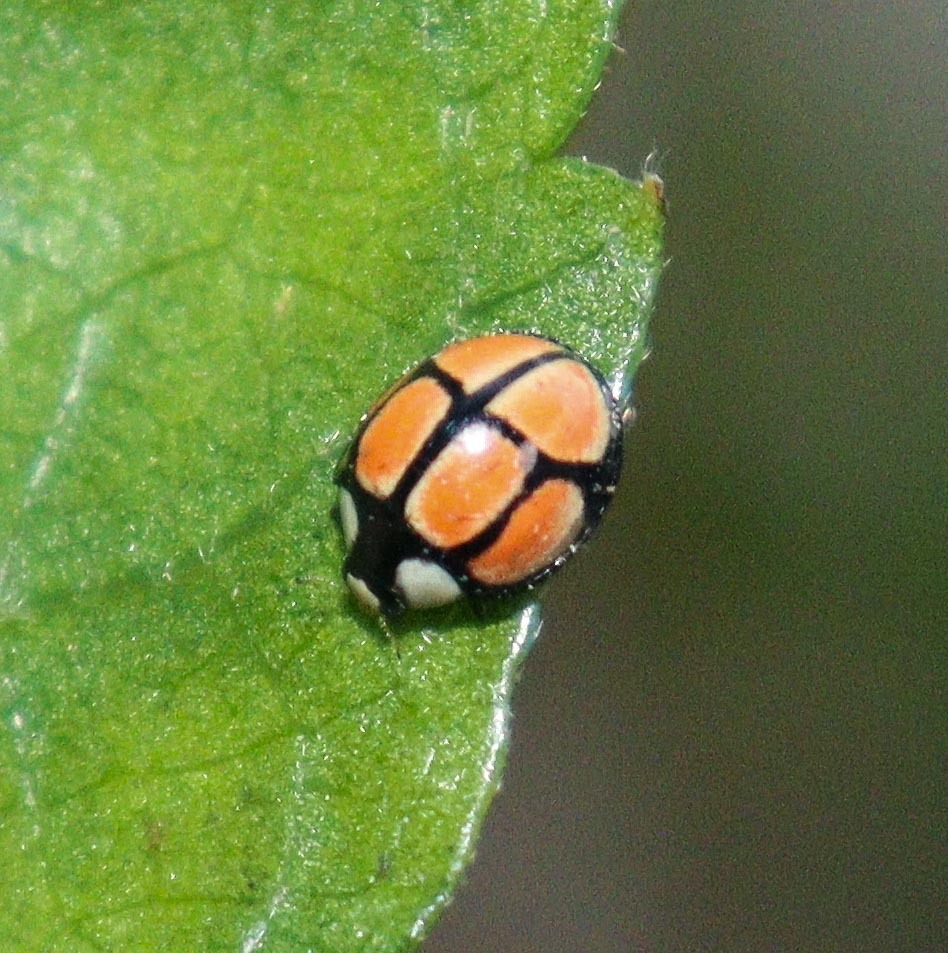

Scientific classification
- Kingdom: Animalia
- Phylum: Arthropoda
- Clade: Pancrustacea
- Class: Insecta
- Order: Coleoptera
- Suborder: Polyphaga
- Infraorder: Cucujiformia
- Family: Coccinellidae
- Genus: Oenopia
- Species: O. sexareata

Binomial name
- Oenopia sexareata (Mulsant, 1853)

Synonyms
- Coelophora sexareata Mulsant, 1853; Coelophora sexareata var. lacerata Sicard, 1913

= Oenopia sexareata =

Species of beetle

Oenopia sexareata is a species of beetle of the family Coccinellidae. It is found in India (Arunachal Pradesh, Assam, Bihar, Himachal Pradesh, Manipur, Meghalaya, Mizoram, Punjab, Sikkim, Uttarakhand, Uttar Pradesh, West Bengal), Nepal, Bhutan, Myanmar, China and Vietnam.

== Description ==
Adults reach a length of about 3.85–4.32 mm (0.152–0.170 in). The head is creamy white to yellow in males and black in females. The pronotum is black with light yellow anterior corners and the elytra are bright carmine red, orange or yellowish with a pattern of six cells.

== Life history ==
They have been recorded preying on various Aphidoidea species.
