= Alloneda dodecaspilota =

Scientific classification
- Kingdom: Animalia
- Phylum: Arthropoda
- Clade: Pancrustacea
- Class: Insecta
- Order: Coleoptera
- Suborder: Polyphaga
- Infraorder: Cucujiformia
- Family: Coccinellidae
- Genus: Alloneda
- Species: A. dodecaspilota

Binomial name
- Alloneda dodecaspilota (Hope, 1831)

Synonyms
- Coccinella 12-spilota Hope, 1831

Species of beetle

Alloneda dodecaspilota is a species of beetle of the family Coccinellidae. It is found in India (Arunachal Pradesh, Assam, Manipur, Nagaland, Sikkim, Uttarakhand, Uttar Pradesh, West Bengal), Bhutan, Nepal, Tibet, Myanmar, Thailand and China.

== Description ==
Adults reach a length of about 6.5–8 mm (0.26–0.31 in). They are bright lemon yellow with black spots on the pronotum and elytra. The ventral surface is mostly yellow.

== Life history ==
They have been recorded preying on various aphids.
