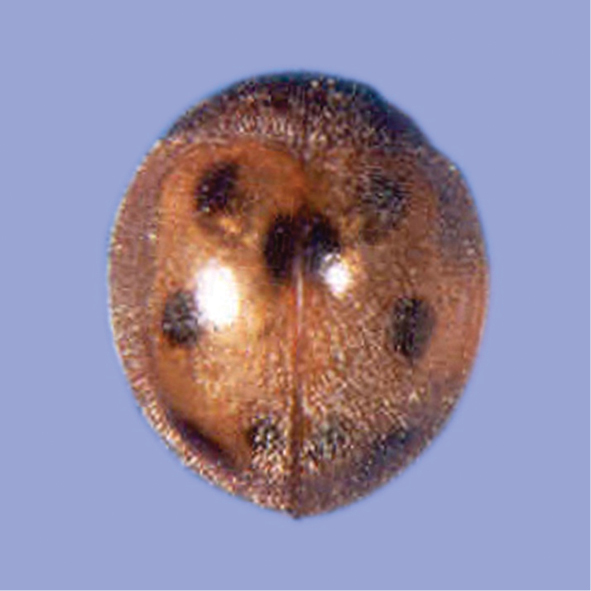

Scientific classification
- Kingdom: Animalia
- Phylum: Arthropoda
- Clade: Pancrustacea
- Class: Insecta
- Order: Coleoptera
- Suborder: Polyphaga
- Infraorder: Cucujiformia
- Family: Coccinellidae
- Genus: Pharoscymnus
- Species: P. flexibilis

Binomial name
- Pharoscymnus flexibilis (Mulsant, 1853)

= Pharoscymnus flexibilis =

Species of beetle

Pharoscymnus flexibilis is a species of lady beetle in the family Coccinellidae. It is found in Southern Asia.
