= Coelophora bissellata =

Scientific classification
- Kingdom: Animalia
- Phylum: Arthropoda
- Clade: Pancrustacea
- Class: Insecta
- Order: Coleoptera
- Suborder: Polyphaga
- Infraorder: Cucujiformia
- Family: Coccinellidae
- Genus: Coelophora
- Species: C. bissellata

Binomial name
- Coelophora bissellata Mulsant, 1850

Synonyms
- Caria gracilicornis Weise, 1902; Coelophora orientalis Sathe & Bhosale, 2002 (preocc.)

Species of ladybug

Coelophora bissellata is a species of ladybug native to regions of Asia such as the south east, India and Indonesia. It is one of the better known species of Coelophora in India.

They are around 4.8–5.7 millimeters in length and around 5.3–5.5 millimeters in width. They have a round shape. Head can be either creamy yellow or pale pink in color. The ground colour of elytra can range from carmine red to orange yellow on disk with margins a yellowish brown color.
