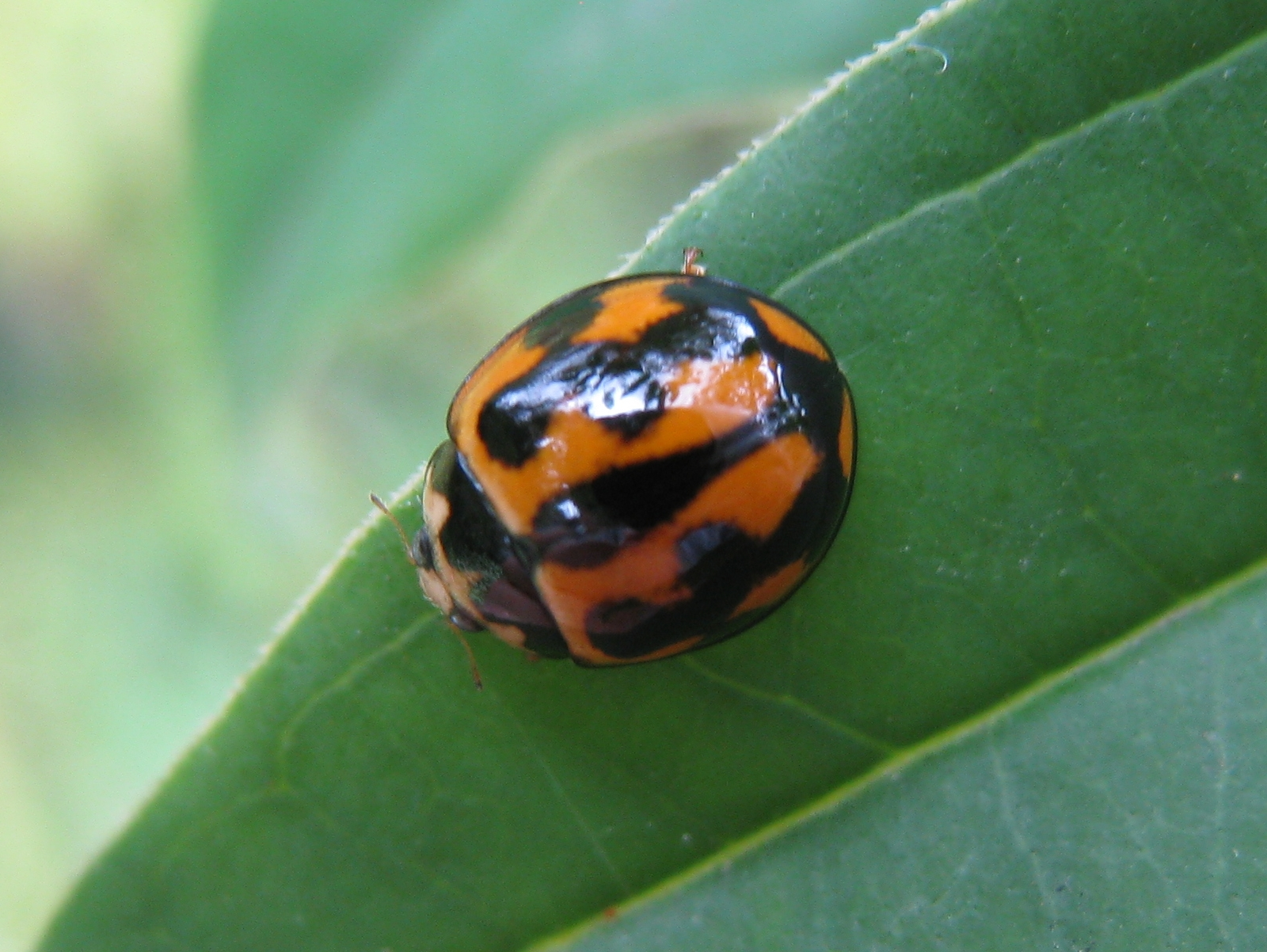
- Coelophora inaequalis

Scientific classification
- Kingdom: Animalia
- Phylum: Arthropoda
- Clade: Pancrustacea
- Class: Insecta
- Order: Coleoptera
- Suborder: Polyphaga
- Infraorder: Cucujiformia
- Family: Coccinellidae
- Subfamily: Coccinellinae
- Tribe: Coccinellini
- Genus: Coelophora; Mulsant, 1850

Synonyms
- Artemis Mulsant, 1850; Autotela Weise, 1900; Cyphocaria Crotch, 1871; Lemnia Mulsant, 1850; Osumia Kurisaki, 1923; Spilocaria Timberlake, 1943

= Coelophora =

Genus of beetles

Coelophora is a genus of ladybird beetles in the family Coccinellidae. There are about 14 described species in Coelophora.

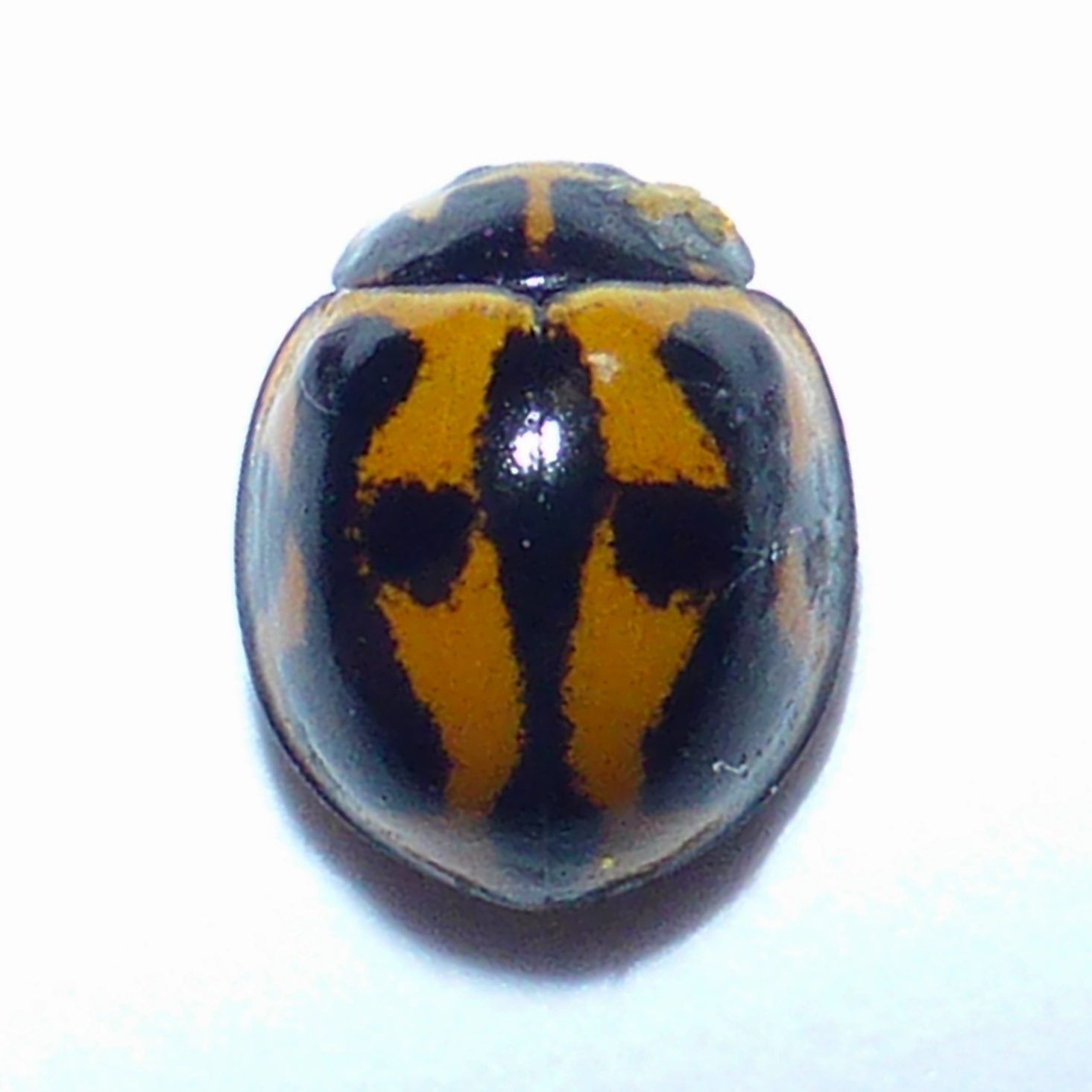
Coelophora inaequalis

== Species ==
These species belong to the genus Coelophora:

- Coelophora atrolineata Fairmaire, 1881
- Coelophora bifida
- Coelophora biplagiata (Swartz, 1808)
- Coelophora biquadriguttata
- Coelophora bissellata Mulsant, 1850
- Coelophora bowringii Crotch, 1874
- Coelophora brunniplagiata
- Coelophora circumvelata Mulsant, 1850
- Coelophora coccea
- Coelophora coronata
- Coelophora cuaraoana
- Coelophora decemguttata
- Coelophora decimmaculata
- Coelophora decorsei
- Coelophora deficiens
- Coelophora desjardini
- Coelophora discalis
- Coelophora duvaucelii (Mulsant, 1850)
- Coelophora fallax
- Coelophora femorata
- Coelophora flavomarginata
- Coelophora freudei
- Coelophora inaequalis (Fabricius, 1775) (common Australian or variable lady beetle)
- Coelophora itoi
- Coelophora javana
- Coelophora javanica
- Coelophora jianfengensis
- Coelophora laeta
- Coelophora loi
- Coelophora lushuiensis
- Coelophora machadoi
- Coelophora madagascariensis
- Coelophora maderi
- Coelophora mesomelas
- Coelophora minki
- Coelophora moesta
- Coelophora momboensis
- Coelophora newporti
- Coelophora nigra
- Coelophora nitidicollis
- Coelophora octopunctata
- Coelophora orientalis
- Coelophora picticollis
- Coelophora pupillata (Swartz, 1808) (tenspotted lady beetle)
- Coelophora rubronigra
- Coelophora rufovittata
- Coelophora sandokan
- Coelophora sanguinosa
- Coelophora saucia (Mulsant, 1850)
- Coelophora schultzei
- Coelophora sexguttata
- Coelophora simulans
- Coelophora songchuana
- Coelophora stigmatica
- Coelophora susinii
- Coelophora varicolor
- Coelophora vesiculata
- Coelophora vietnamica
- Coelophora vittula

== Selected former species ==
- Coelophora tanoi
