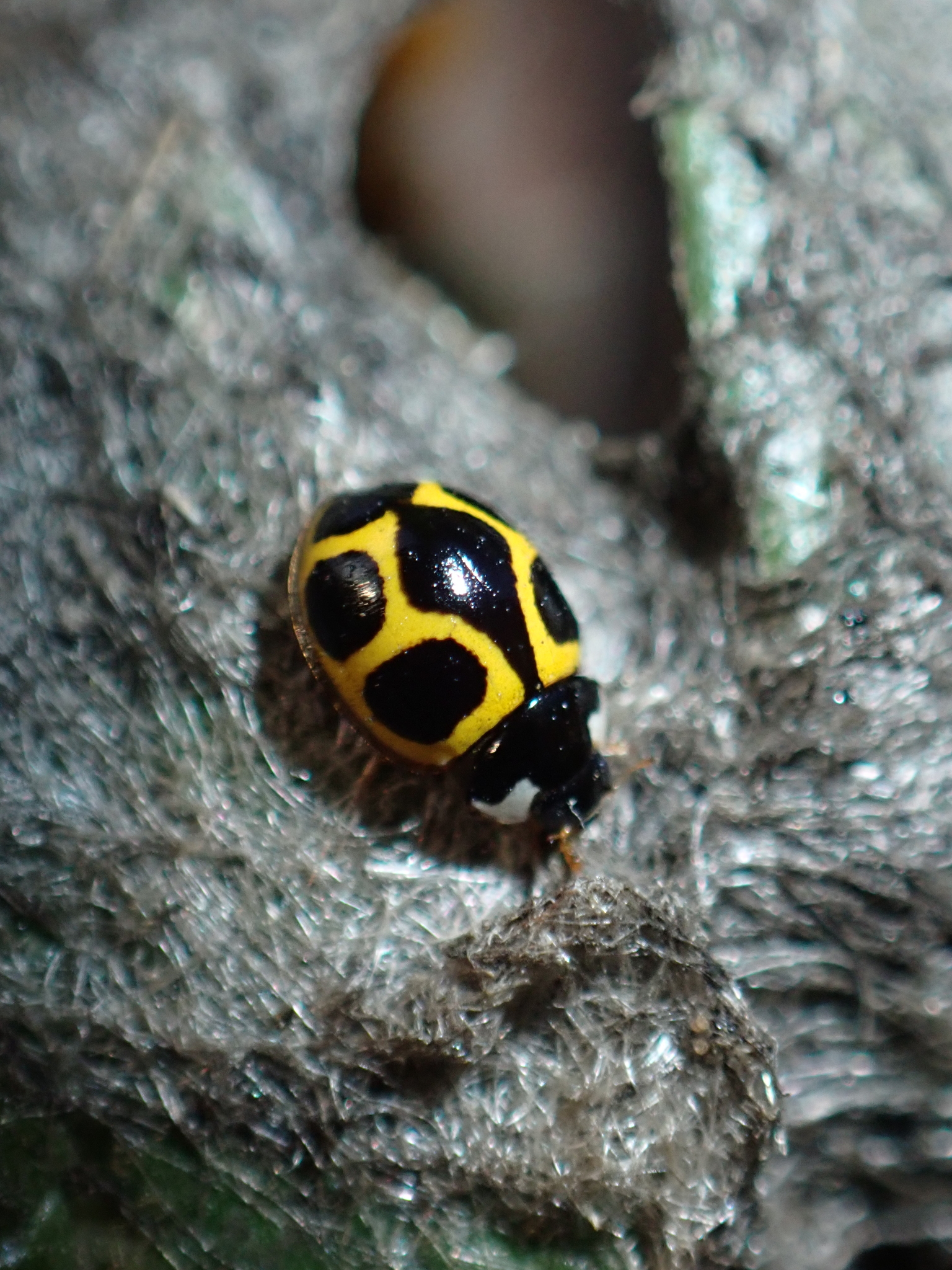

Scientific classification
- Kingdom: Animalia
- Phylum: Arthropoda
- Clade: Pancrustacea
- Class: Insecta
- Order: Coleoptera
- Suborder: Polyphaga
- Infraorder: Cucujiformia
- Family: Coccinellidae
- Genus: Oenopia
- Species: O. mimica

Binomial name
- Oenopia mimica Weise, 1902

= Oenopia mimica =

Species of beetle

Oenopia mimica is a species of beetle in the Coccinellidae family. It is found in India, Nepal, Myanmar, and Laos.

== Description ==
Adults reach a length of about 3–4.3 mm (0.12–0.17 in). Oenopia mimica beetles are subrounded and long in shape with a black pronotum and yellow elytra. Each elytron has two slightly dilated, oblong markings and two black spots.
