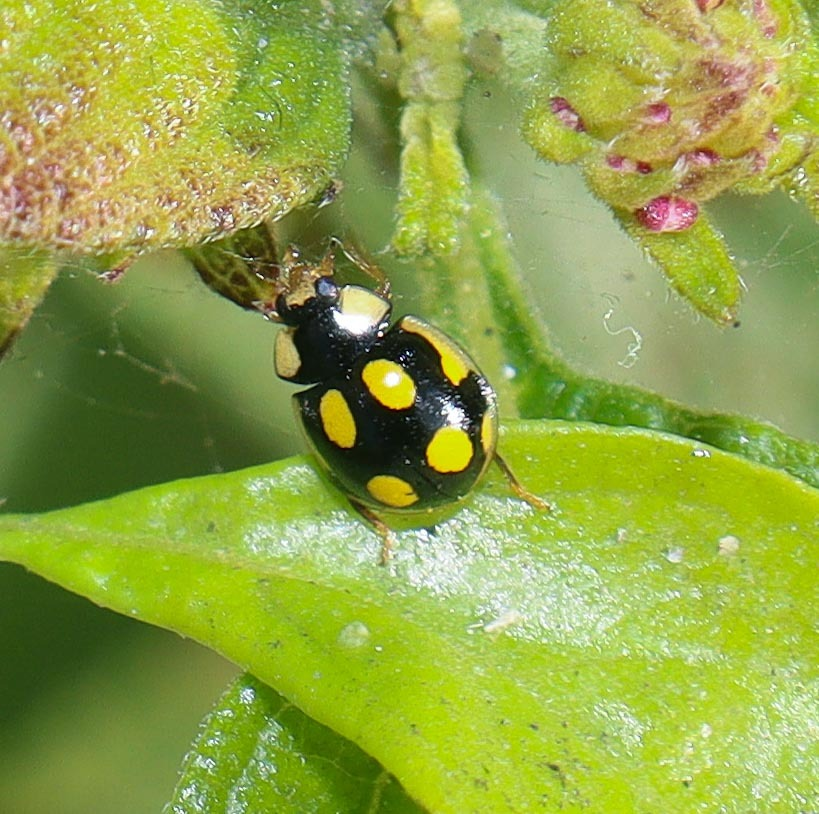

Scientific classification
- Kingdom: Animalia
- Phylum: Arthropoda
- Clade: Pancrustacea
- Class: Insecta
- Order: Coleoptera
- Suborder: Polyphaga
- Infraorder: Cucujiformia
- Family: Coccinellidae
- Genus: Oenopia
- Species: O. quadripunctata

Binomial name
- Oenopia quadripunctata Kapur, 1963

= Oenopia quadripunctata =

Species of beetle

Oenopia quadripunctata is a species of beetle in the Coccinellidae family. It is found in India, Nepal, Bhutan, China, and Myanmar.

== Description ==
Oenopia quadripunctata has a short, moderately convex, oval-shaped body. Its head, pronotum, and elytra are black. Its pronotum has quadrangular flavous areas on either side. Each elytron bears one premedian and postmedian yellow spot and yellow lateral margins. Oenopia quadripunctata beetles are approximately 3–3.5 mm (0.12–0.14 in) in length.
