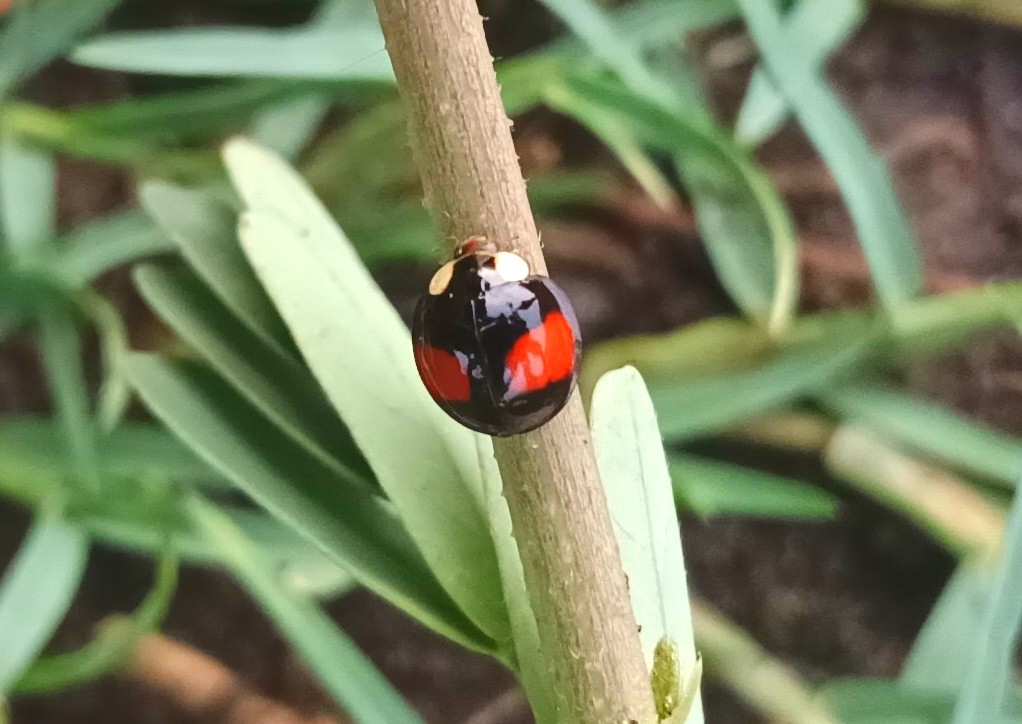

Scientific classification
- Kingdom: Animalia
- Phylum: Arthropoda
- Clade: Pancrustacea
- Class: Insecta
- Order: Coleoptera
- Suborder: Polyphaga
- Infraorder: Cucujiformia
- Family: Coccinellidae
- Genus: Coelophora
- Species: C. saucia

Binomial name
- Coelophora saucia (Mulsant, 1850)

Synonyms
- Lemnia saucia Mulsant, 1850; Lemnia melanota Mulsant, 1850; Leis calypso Mulsant, 1856; Coelophora mouhoti Crotch, 1874; Coelophora swinhoii Crotch, 1874; Cheilomenes takanonis Ohta, 1929; Coelophora ishidai Ohta, 1931

= Coelophora saucia =

Species of beetle

Coelophora saucia is a species of ladybird in the family Coccinellidae.

Coelophora saucia is endemic to Asia and can be found in India, Japan and the Philippines. It has also been collected in the Indochinese peninsula. It was introduced to Taiwan in order to control aphids (Aphidoidea) which feed on the country's sugar cane crops.

It was first described as Lemnia saucia by French entomologist, Étienne Mulsant, in 1850 from the collections of Frederick William Hope and John O. Westwood in the British Museum of Natural History.
