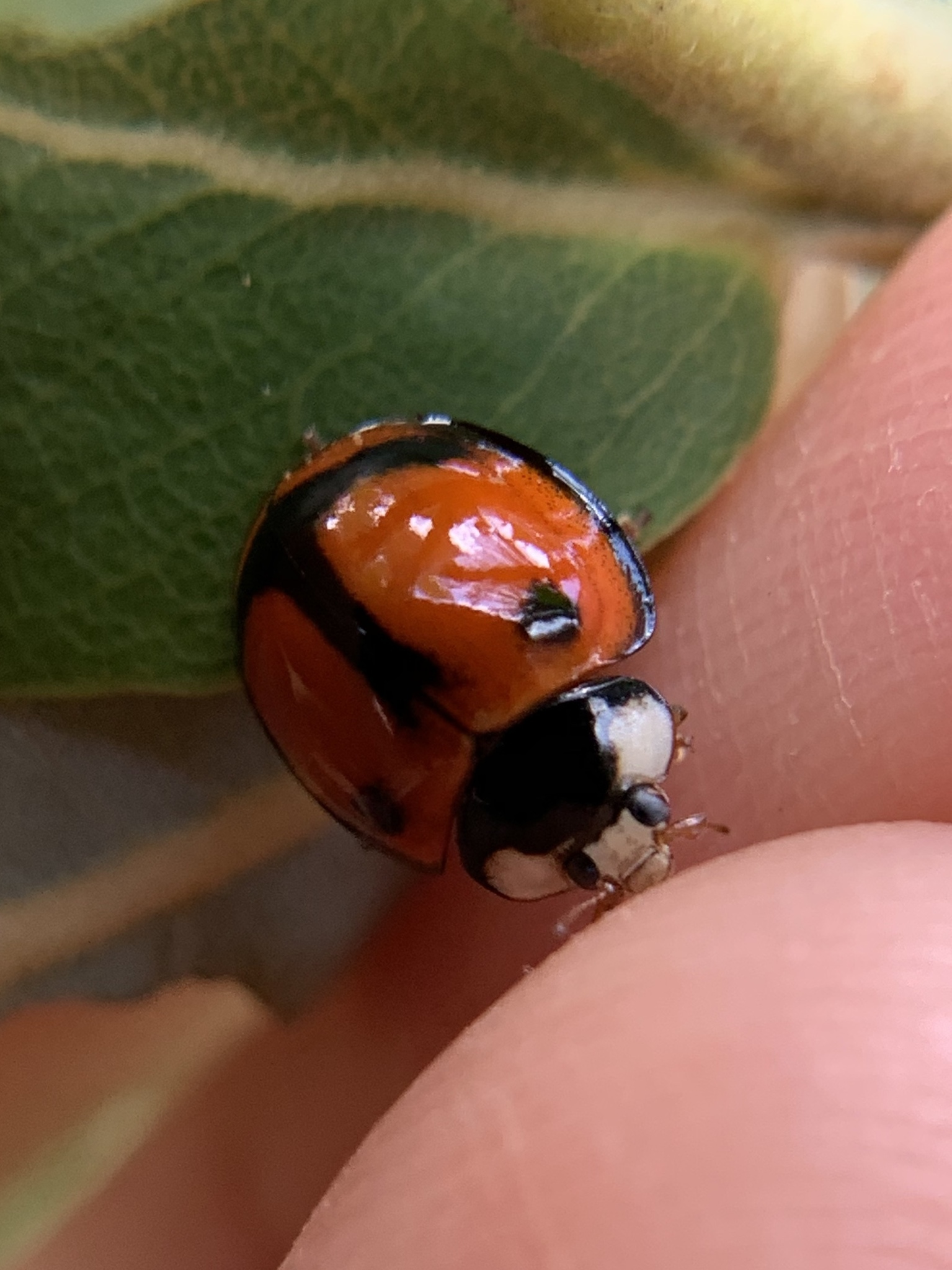

Scientific classification
- Kingdom: Animalia
- Phylum: Arthropoda
- Clade: Pancrustacea
- Class: Insecta
- Order: Coleoptera
- Suborder: Polyphaga
- Infraorder: Cucujiformia
- Family: Coccinellidae
- Genus: Coelophora
- Species: C. biplagiata

Binomial name
- Coelophora biplagiata (Schwarz, 1808)

Synonyms
- Coccinella biplagiata Schwarz in Schönherr, 1808; Coccinella oblongata Thunberg, 1820; Lemnia fraudulenta Mulsant, 1850; Coelophora nepalensis Crotch, 1874; Coelophora melanota var. minor Gorham, 1891; Coelophora personata Weise, 1910; Osumia bimaculata Kurisaki, 1923

= Coelophora biplagiata =

Species of ladybug

Coelophora biplagiata is a species of ladybug native to the Southeast Asia region in regions such as China.

They are 5.5–6.5 millimeters long and 4.5–5.5 millimeters in width. The body is broadly oval shaped. Head is light yellow with the pronotum black, lateral sides yellowish confluent along cephalic border. The elytra is black with a broad reddish patch, irregular in outline. The larva of this species are black and yellow colored. They are cylindrical and elongated having length of about 12 millimeters and a width of 3.9 millimeters.
