= Singhikalia ornata =

Scientific classification
- Kingdom: Animalia
- Phylum: Arthropoda
- Clade: Pancrustacea
- Class: Insecta
- Order: Coleoptera
- Suborder: Polyphaga
- Infraorder: Cucujiformia
- Family: Coccinellidae
- Genus: Singhikalia
- Species: S. ornata

Binomial name
- Singhikalia ornata Kapur, 1963

Synonyms
- Singhikalia subfasciata Miyatake, 1972

Species of beetle

Singhikalia ornata is a species of beetle of the family Coccinellidae. It is found in India (Sikkim), Vietnam and Taiwan.

== Description ==
Adults reach a length of about 7.5–7.8 mm (0.30–0.31 in). They are red, the pronotum with two black spots on the posterior margin and the elytra with 14 black spots and black lateral margins.
