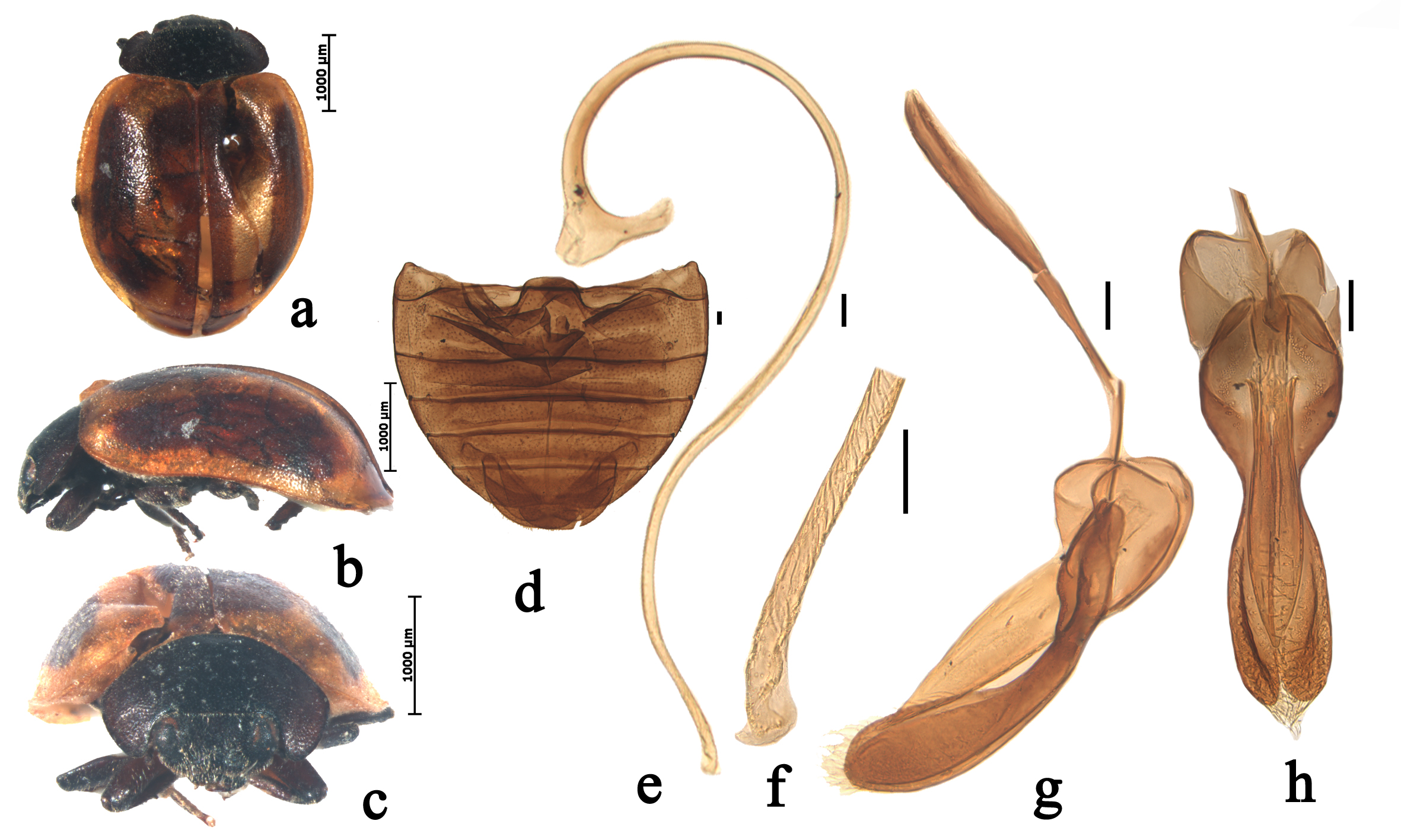

Scientific classification
- Kingdom: Animalia
- Phylum: Arthropoda
- Clade: Pancrustacea
- Class: Insecta
- Order: Coleoptera
- Suborder: Polyphaga
- Infraorder: Cucujiformia
- Family: Coccinellidae
- Genus: Priscibrumus
- Species: P. disjunctus

Binomial name
- Priscibrumus disjunctus Canepari, 1997

= Priscibrumus disjunctus =

Species of beetle

Priscibrumus disjunctus is a species of beetle of the family Coccinellidae. It is found in Nepal and China (Tibet).

== Description ==
Adults reach a length of about 3.75–4.1 mm (0.148–0.161 in). The head, pronotum and scutellum are black, while the elytra are ochraceous to yellowish brown with three longitudinal stripes.
