= Oenopia diabolica =

Scientific classification
- Kingdom: Animalia
- Phylum: Arthropoda
- Clade: Pancrustacea
- Class: Insecta
- Order: Coleoptera
- Suborder: Polyphaga
- Infraorder: Cucujiformia
- Family: Coccinellidae
- Genus: Oenopia
- Species: O. diabolica

Binomial name
- Oenopia diabolica Canepari, 1997

Species of beetle

Oenopia diabolica is a species of beetle of the family Coccinellidae. It is found in Nepal.

== Description ==
Adults reach a length of about 3.15 mm (0.124 in). They are reddish yellow to yellowish, the pronotum with a large black macula, and the elytra with two transverse fasciae.
