= Coelophora nitidicollis =

Scientific classification
- Kingdom: Animalia
- Phylum: Arthropoda
- Clade: Pancrustacea
- Class: Insecta
- Order: Coleoptera
- Suborder: Polyphaga
- Infraorder: Cucujiformia
- Family: Coccinellidae
- Genus: Coelophora
- Species: C. nitidicollis

Binomial name
- Coelophora nitidicollis Kapur, 1963

Species of beetle

Coelophora nitidicollis is a species of beetle of the family Coccinellidae. It is found in India (Sikkim).

== Description ==
Adults reach a length of about 4.25 mm (0.167 in). They are yellow, the pronotum with a black macula on the posterior margin. The scutellum is dark reddish brown and the elytra have two lateral stripes and one sutural stripe.
