= Coelophora circumvelata =

Scientific classification
- Kingdom: Animalia
- Phylum: Arthropoda
- Clade: Pancrustacea
- Class: Insecta
- Order: Coleoptera
- Suborder: Polyphaga
- Infraorder: Cucujiformia
- Family: Coccinellidae
- Genus: Coelophora
- Species: C. circumvelata

Binomial name
- Coelophora circumvelata (Mulsant, 1850)

Synonyms
- Coccinella cincta Hope, 1831 (non Fabricius, 1798: preoccupied); Coelophora cincta (Hope, 1831 nec Fabricius, 1798: preoccupied); Coleophora cincta (lapsus); Lemnia circumvelata Mulsant, 1850

Species of ladybug

Coelophora circumvelata is a species of ladybug in the tribe Coccinellini. It is native to Nepal. It was described by Étienne Mulsant in 1850.

It can grow up to 6-6.6 millimeters in length. It is mostly round in shape with a yellow head and large eyes. The elytra are also yellow.
