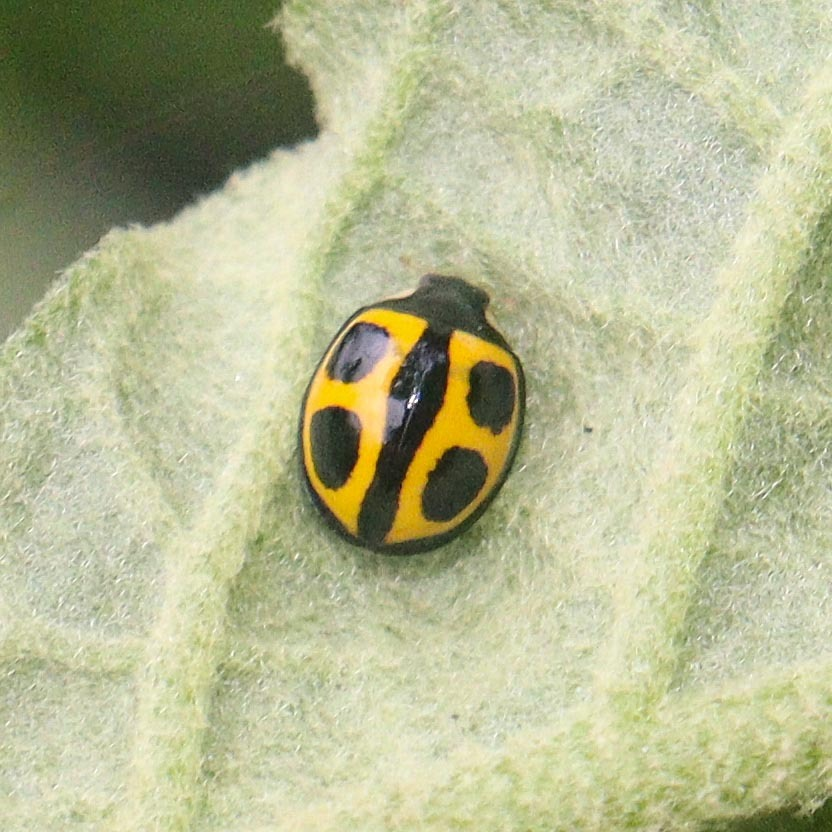

Scientific classification
- Kingdom: Animalia
- Phylum: Arthropoda
- Clade: Pancrustacea
- Class: Insecta
- Order: Coleoptera
- Suborder: Polyphaga
- Infraorder: Cucujiformia
- Family: Coccinellidae
- Genus: Oenopia
- Species: O. kirbyi

Binomial name
- Oenopia kirbyi Mulsant, 1850

= Oenopia kirbyi =

Species of beetle

Oenopia kirbyi is a species of beetle in the Coccinellidae family. They are found in India, Bhutan, China, Myanmar, Nepal, and Thailand. They have been noted as a potential means of pest control against the rose aphid, Macrosiphum rosae, of which they are voracious predators.

== Description ==
Adults reach a length of about 3.7–3.9 mm (0.15–0.15 in). Oenopia kirbyi beetles have a distinctive lemon-yellow and black coloration.
