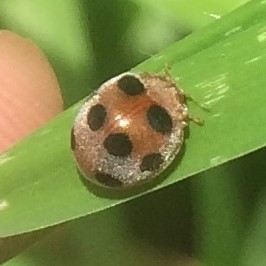

Scientific classification
- Kingdom: Animalia
- Phylum: Arthropoda
- Clade: Pancrustacea
- Class: Insecta
- Order: Coleoptera
- Suborder: Polyphaga
- Infraorder: Cucujiformia
- Family: Coccinellidae
- Genus: Afidentula
- Species: A. bisquadripunctata

Binomial name
- Afidentula bisquadripunctata (Gyllenhal, 1808)

Synonyms
- Coccinella bisquadripunctata Gyllenhal in Schönherr, 1808; Epilachna bisquadripunctata Crotch 1874; Afidenta bisquadripunctata Dieke 1947; Afidentula bisquadripunctata Pang & Mao 1979; Afissula bisquadripunctata Ren et al. 2009; Epilachna herbigrada Mulsant, 1850

= Afidentula bisquadripunctata =

Species of beetle

Afidentula bisquadripunctata, is a species of lady beetle found in India, Pakistan, China, Sri Lanka and Nepal.

== Description ==
Body length is about 4.00 to 4.10 mm.

Host plants are Apluda mutica and Arthraxon hispidulus.
