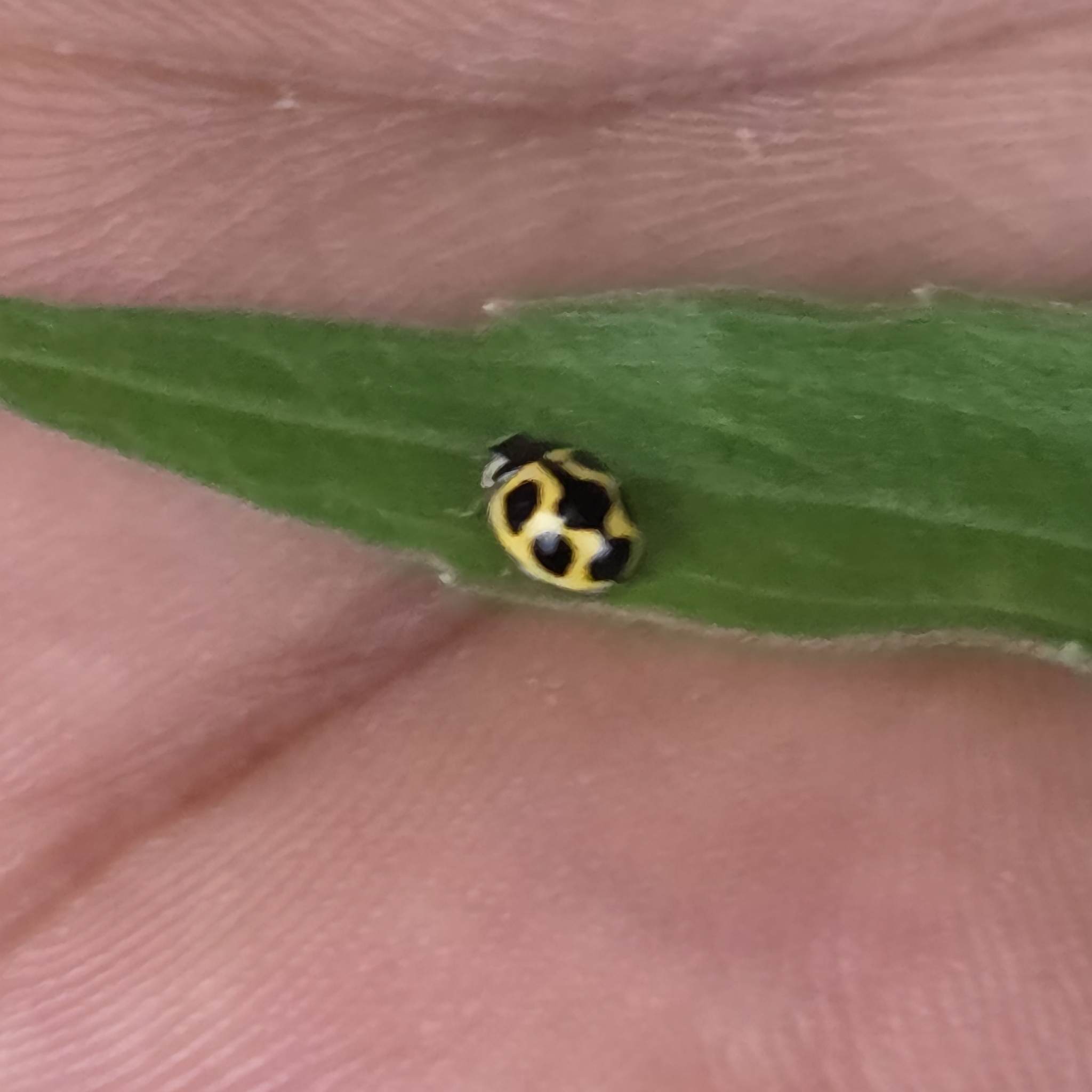

Scientific classification
- Kingdom: Animalia
- Phylum: Arthropoda
- Clade: Pancrustacea
- Class: Insecta
- Order: Coleoptera
- Suborder: Polyphaga
- Infraorder: Cucujiformia
- Family: Coccinellidae
- Genus: Oenopia
- Species: O. sauzeti

Binomial name
- Oenopia sauzeti Mulsant, 1866

= Oenopia sauzeti =

Species of beetle

Oenopia sauzeti is a species of beetle in the Coccinellidae family. It is found in India, Bhutan, China, Pakistan, Laos, Myanmar, Nepal, Thailand, and Vietnam.

== Description ==
Adult Oenopia sauzeti range from 0.35-0.42 cm. They are oval in shape. The coloration of the head differs between the sexes, with the heads of males being mostly pale yellow while the female's head is completely black. The pronotum is black with two large white markings at either anterior corner. The elytra are yellow with a black line running down the center, tapering at both ends and widening in the middle. There are two black spots on this line and two more black markings on each elytron.
