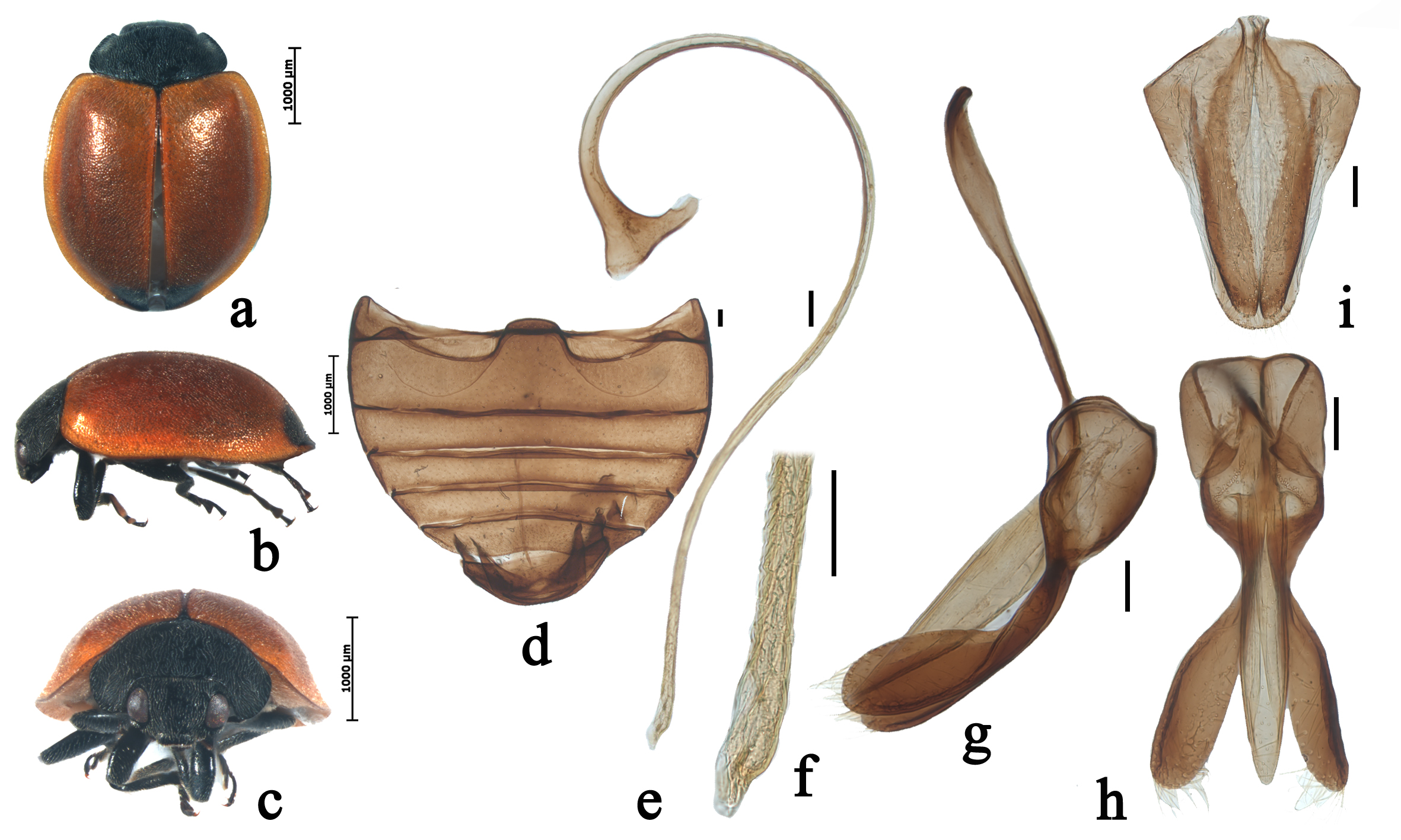

Scientific classification
- Kingdom: Animalia
- Phylum: Arthropoda
- Clade: Pancrustacea
- Class: Insecta
- Order: Coleoptera
- Suborder: Polyphaga
- Infraorder: Cucujiformia
- Family: Coccinellidae
- Genus: Priscibrumus
- Species: P. uropygialis

Binomial name
- Priscibrumus uropygialis (Mulsant, 1853)

Synonyms
- Exochomus uropygialis Mulsant, 1853

= Priscibrumus uropygialis =

Species of beetle

Priscibrumus uropygialis is a species of beetle of the family Coccinellidae. It is found in India (Arunachal Pradesh, Himachal Pradesh, Jammu & Kashmir, Sikkim, Uttar Pradesh, West Bengal), Pakistan, Nepal and Bhutan.

== Description ==
Adults reach a length of about 3.8–4.3 mm (0.15–0.17 in). The head, pronotum and scutellum are black, while the elytra are yellowish testaceous to reddish brown with a black apical patch.

== Life history ==
They have been recorded preying on various Aphidoidea species and various diaspine scales.
