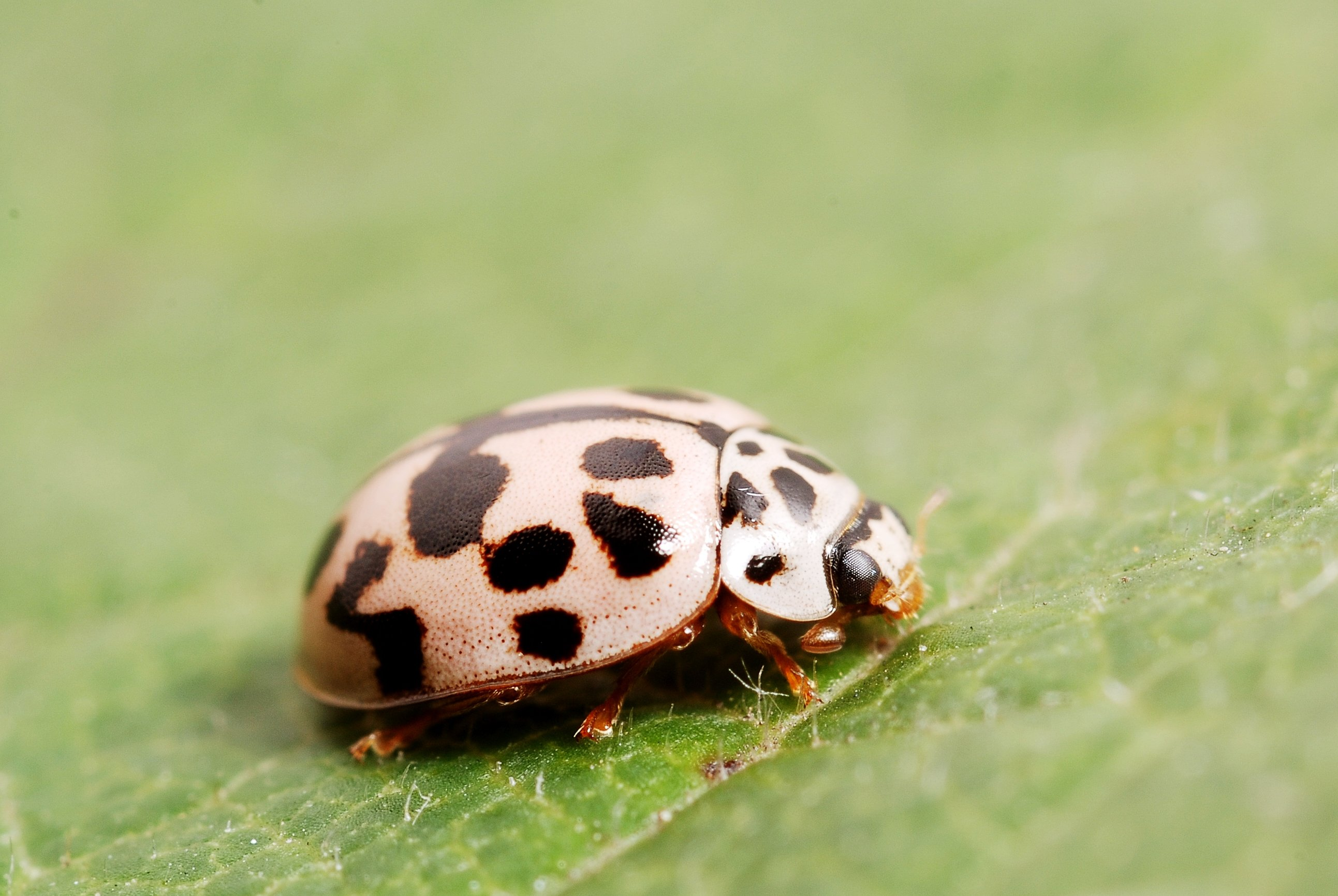
- Oenopia conglobata

Scientific classification
- Kingdom: Animalia
- Phylum: Arthropoda
- Clade: Pancrustacea
- Class: Insecta
- Order: Coleoptera
- Suborder: Polyphaga
- Infraorder: Cucujiformia
- Family: Coccinellidae
- Subfamily: Coccinellinae
- Tribe: Coccinellini
- Genus: Oenopia; Mulsant, 1850

Synonyms
- Aza Mulsant, 1850; Synharmonia Ganglbauer, 1899; Protocaria Timberlake, 1943; Gyrocaria Timberlake, 1943; Pseudoharmonia Savoyskaya, 1963; Paramulsantina Hoang, 1982; Pseudoenopia Iablokoff-Khnzorian, 1986

= Oenopia (beetle) =

Genus of beetles

Oenopia is an Old World genus of aphid-eating beetles in the Coccinellini tribe. The genus has been recorded in Europe, Russia, Africa, India, Sri Lanka, China, Japan, Philippines, New Guinea, and Australia.

== Description ==
Oenopia species are diverse in appearance, with some possessing rounded, convex forms and others elongate and flattened. The genus is distinguished by distinct characteristics in the genitalia of both sexes.

== Taxonomy ==
Oenopia contains the following species:

- Oenopia adelgivora
- Oenopia alesioides
- Oenopia baoshanensis
- Oenopia bennigseni
- Oenopia billieti
- Oenopia bissexnotata
- Oenopia chinensis
- Oenopia conglobata
- Oenopia cuneata
- Oenopia dequenensis
- Oenopia diabolica
- Oenopia doderoi
- Oenopia doublieri
- Oenopia dracoguttata
- Oenopia emmerichi
- Oenopia excellens
- Oenopia exclamationis
- Oenopia formosana
- Oenopia gracilis
- Oenopia guerini
- Oenopia guttata
- Oenopia herteli
- Oenopia hiekei
- Oenopia hirayamai
- Oenopia impustulata
- Oenopia kirbyi
- Oenopia krausei
- Oenopia latitegmina
- Oenopia lyncea
- Oenopia medogensis
- Oenopia mimica
- Oenopia mombonensis
- Oenopia montana
- Oenopia nigrolineata
- Oenopia octovittata
- Oenopia oncina
- Oenopia pusilla
- Oenopia quadripunctata
- Oenopia sanxiaensis
- Oenopia sauzeti
- Oenopia scalaris
- Oenopia sexareata
- Oenopia sexmaculata
- Oenopia shirkuhensis
- Oenopia signatella
- Oenopia smetanai
- Oenopia stylifera
- Oenopia takasago
- Oenopia tianquanensis
- Oenopia transversifasciata
- Oenopia zonata

== Selected former species ==
- Oenopia cashmirense
- Oenopia cinctella
- Oenopia divergens
- Oenopia walteri
- Oenopia yunlongensis
