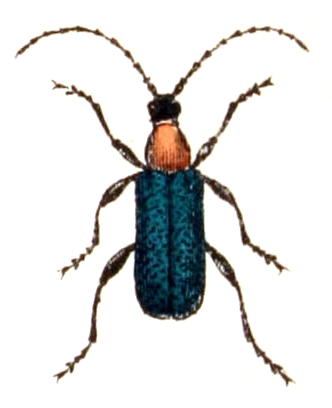
- Acmaeops collaris

Scientific classification
- Domain: Eukaryota
- Kingdom: Animalia
- Phylum: Arthropoda
- Class: Insecta
- Order: Coleoptera
- Suborder: Polyphaga
- Infraorder: Cucujiformia
- Family: Cerambycidae
- Tribe: Rhagiini
- Genus: Acmaeops

= Acmaeops =

Genus of beetles

Acmaeops is a genus of beetles in the family Cerambycidae, containing the following species:

- Acmaeops discoideus (Haldeman, 1847)
- Acmaeops proteus (Kirby in Richardson, 1837)
- Acmaeops brachyptera [=Gnathacmaeops brachypterus]
- Acmaeops discoidea
- Acmaeops marginata
- Acmaeops pratensis [=Gnathacmaeops pratensis]
- Acmaeops septentrionis
- Acmaeops smaragdula
