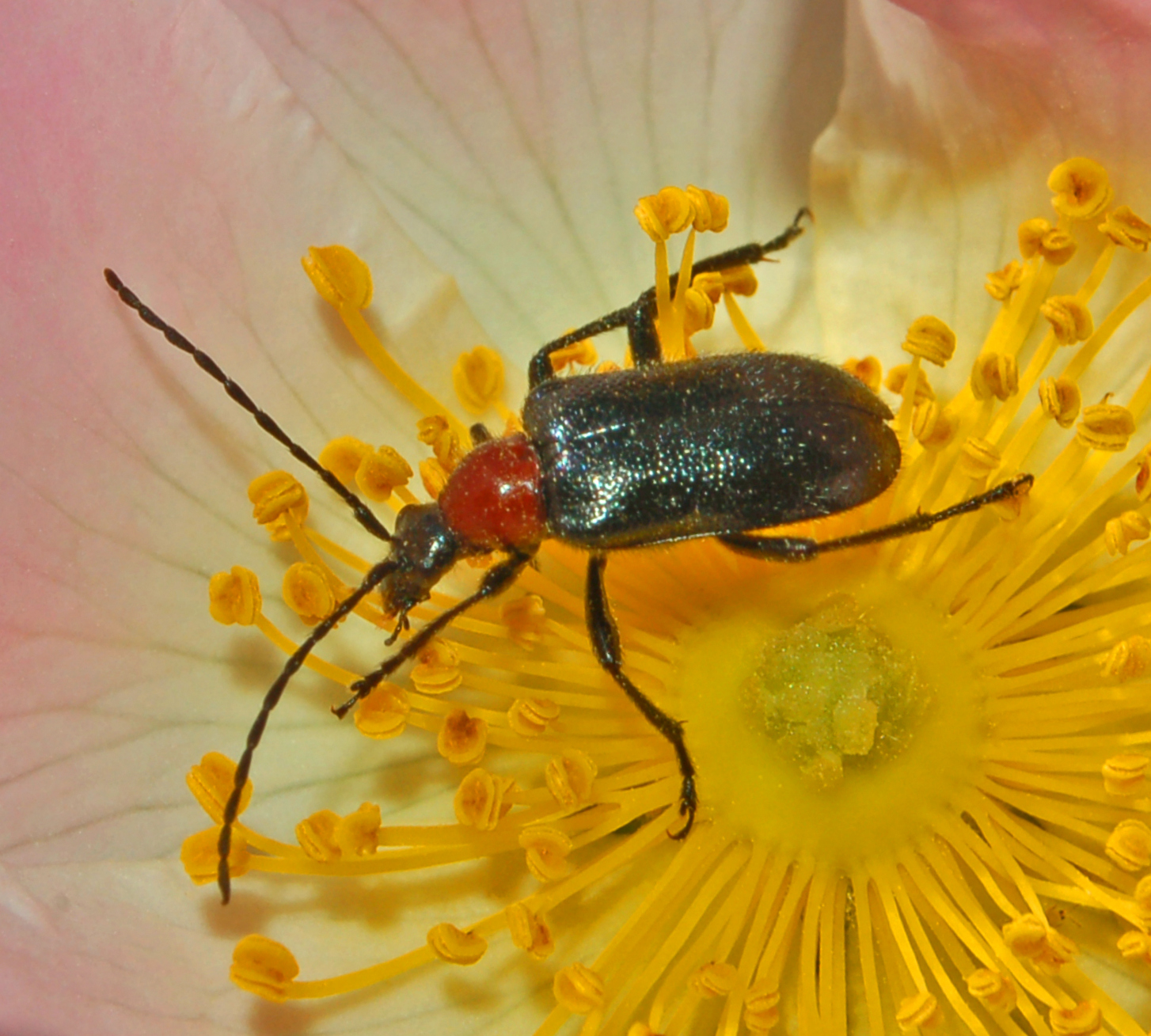

Scientific classification
- Kingdom: Animalia
- Phylum: Arthropoda
- Clade: Pancrustacea
- Class: Insecta
- Order: Coleoptera
- Suborder: Polyphaga
- Infraorder: Cucujiformia
- Family: Cerambycidae
- Genus: Dinoptera
- Species: D. collaris

Binomial name
- Dinoptera collaris (Linnaeus, 1758)

Synonyms
- Acmaeops collaris (Linnaeus) Auctorum; Leptura carneola Schrank, 1798; Leptura collaris Linnaeus, 1758; Leptura ruficollis DeGeer, 1775; Leptura sylvestris Geoffroy, 1785; Pachyta collaris (Linnaeus) Redtenbacher, 1874

= Dinoptera collaris =

Species of beetle

Dinoptera collaris is species of long-horned beetle in the subfamily Lepturinae.

== Subtaxa ==
The following varieties are recognised:

- Dinoptera collaris var. fulvohirsuta Hayrovsky
- Dinoptera collaris var. marginicollis Tippmann
- Dinoptera collaris var. nigricollis Mulsant
- Dinoptera collaris var. slamai Podaný, 1955

== Distribution ==
These beetles are present in most of Europe and in the Near East (Albania, Austria, Belgium, Bulgaria, Croatia, Czech Republic, Denmark, France, Germany, Greece, Hungary, Iran, Italy, Luxembourg, Netherlands, Norway, Poland, Portugal, Romania, Russia, Serbia, Slovakia, Slovenia, Spain, Sweden, Switzerland, Syria, Turkey, and United Kingdom).

== Habitat ==
This species inhabit deciduous forests, especially beech forests and hedge rows.

== Description ==
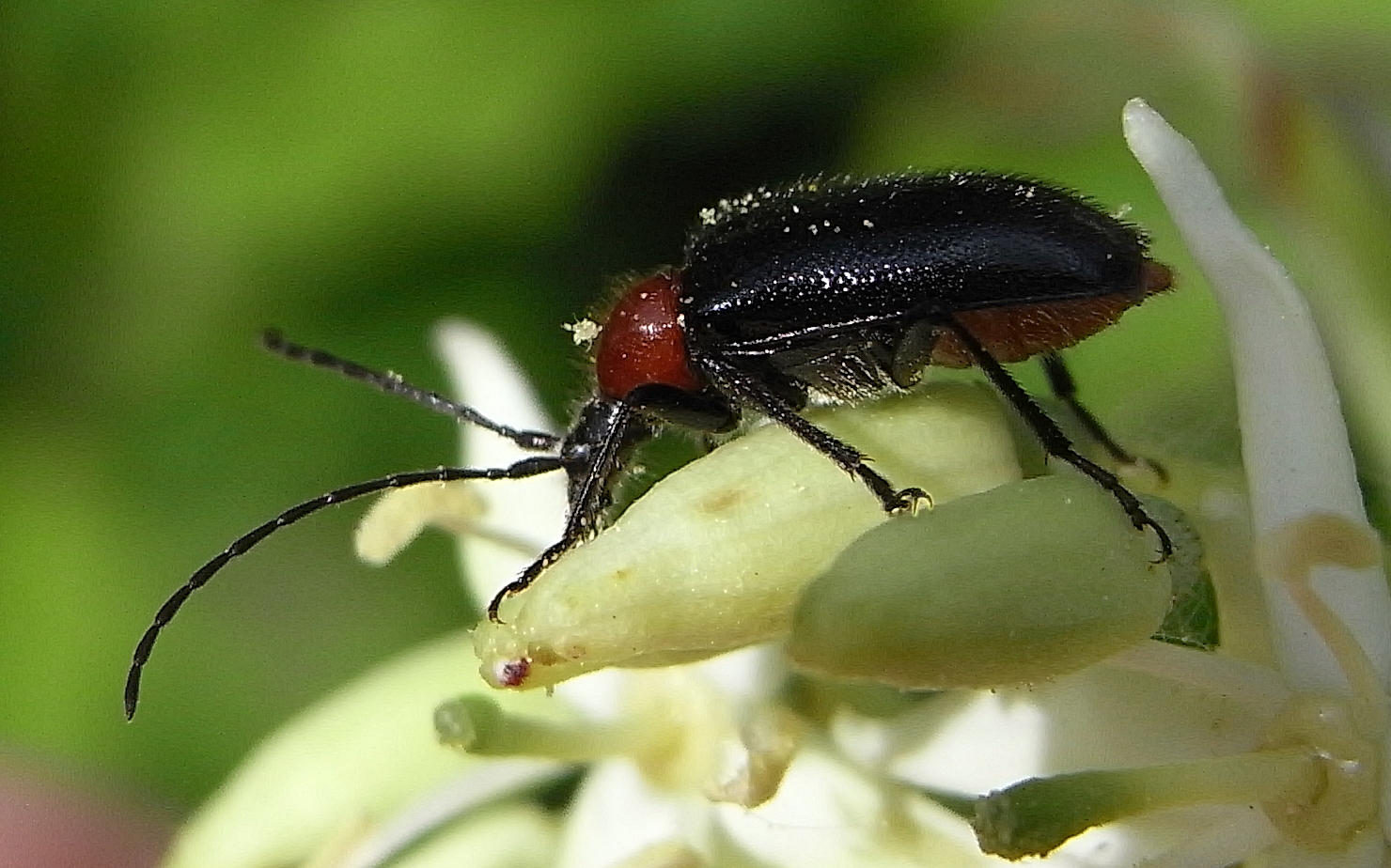
Side view

Dinoptera collaris can reach a length of 6–9 millimetres (0.24–0.35 in). Elytra are bluish-blackish and rather hairy, with dense puncture. Pronotum is almost spherical, usually orange-red, sometimes dark, with sparse punctuation. Antennae are quite long. The abdomen is orange-red.

This species is rather similar to Acmaeops marginatus, Acmaeops pratensis and Acmaeops septentrionis.

== Biology ==
The life cycle lasts two years. The larvae develop under the loose bark, especially of oaks, aspens or apple trees. They are polyphagous wood borers in deciduous trees (Quercus, Pyrus, Acer, Fraxinus, Populus, Malus, Cornus etc.) They overwinter and pupate the following spring.

The adult beetles can be found from April to August feeding on pollen of valerians (Valeriana species), common hawthorn (Crataegus monogyna), elderberry (Sambucus species), sweet chestnut (Castanea sativa) and European pear (Pyrus communis).
