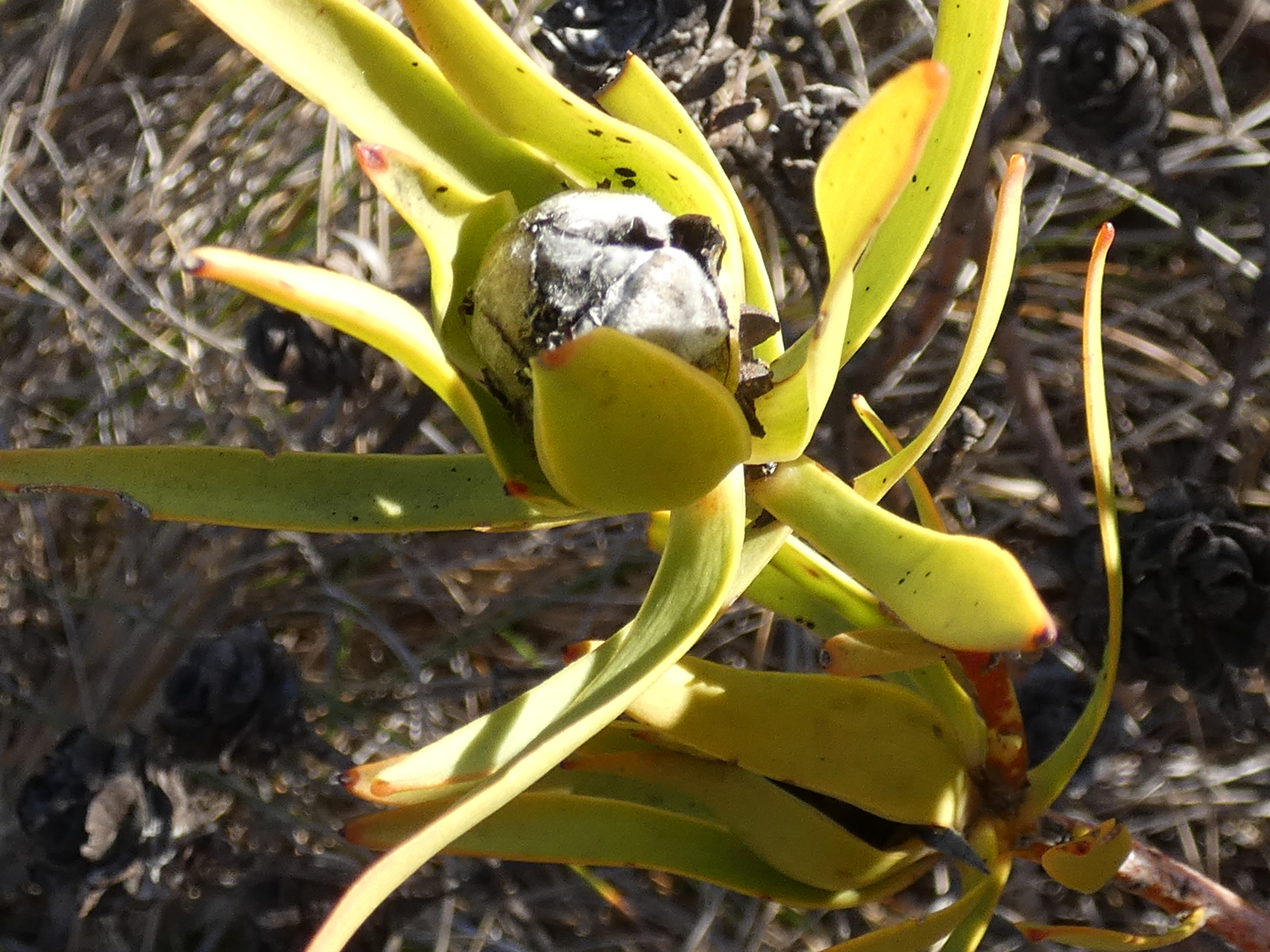
- Mature female cone↑; male flower head visited by the monkey beetle Anisonyx↓
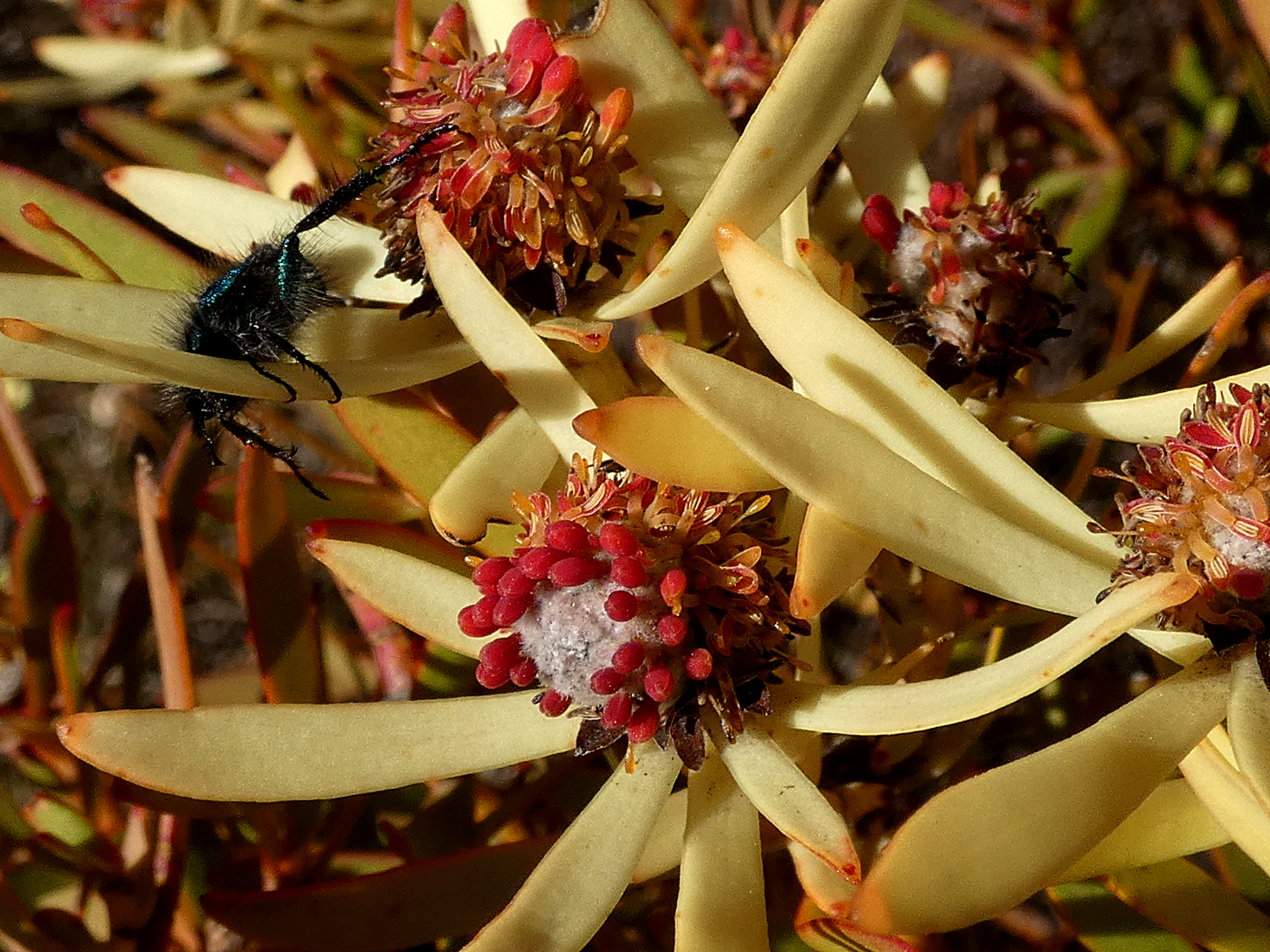

Conservation status
- Least Concern (IUCN 3.1)

Scientific classification
- Kingdom: Plantae
- Clade: Embryophytes
- Clade: Tracheophytes
- Clade: Angiosperms
- Clade: Eudicots
- Order: Proteales
- Family: Proteaceae
- Genus: Leucadendron
- Species: L. salignum

Binomial name
- Leucadendron salignum P.J.Bergius

= Leucadendron salignum =

Species of plant native to South Africa

Leucadendron salignum, also known as the common sunshine conebush, is an evergreen, dioecious shrub in the family Proteaceae. It produces several stems from the ground of up to 2 metres (6 ft 7 in) high. It survives the wildfires that occur every one or two decades in the fynbos, where it occurs, by regrowing from an underground rootstock. Pollinated by beetles, it flowers from April to November. The winged seeds remain in the woody cones until they are released after a fire, and are distributed by the wind. It is possibly the most common Proteaceae species in South Africa, and can be found in the Northern Cape, Western Cape and Eastern Cape provinces. Its current conservation status is Least Concern.

== Description ==
Leucadendron salignum is an evergreen, stiff, upright shrub of up to 2 metres (6 ft 7 in) high, with soft, silky hairs pressed against the branches, with variable leaf sizes and bract colour. Its rigid but rather thin leathery leaves are oblong linear or lance-shaped linear, 2 1/2–7 1/2 cm (0.98–2.95 in) long, 3 1/4–6 1/2 mm (0.13–0.26 in) wide, gradually pointy or with the midrib extended in a pointy tip, with soft, silky hairs pressed against the leaf surface. Like in all species of Leucadendron, the male and female flower heads are on different plants.

The male flower head may be yellow or burgundy red, is cone- or egg-shaped, 8–19 cm (3.1–7.5 in) long, hardly about 1 1/4 cm (0.49 in) across, subtended by an involucre of several leaves of about 1.9 cm (0.75 in) long that are often covered in rusty-coloured soft hairs. The bract subtending the individual male flower is covered with long soft hairs, about 1/2 mm (0.020 in) long, oblong in shape and the tip almost pointed. The lower part of the 4-merous perianth of the male flower that remains merged upon opening called tube is 1 1/2 mm (0.059 in) long, somewhat compressed and covered with long soft hairs. The middle part that consists of four free segments ones the flower opens (called claws) are linear to spade-shaped, about 2 mm (0.079 in) long, and covered with long soft hairs. The higher part consists of four segments (called limbs) that are about 1/2 mm (0.020 in) long, elliptic with a somewhat blunt tip, and softly hairy, and are directly merged with the anthers without a filament, 1/2 mm (0.020 in) long, oblong in shape. The rudimentary style in the male flower is about 3 mm (0.12 in) long, thread-shaped, hairless with an egg-shaped stigma of 1/2 mm (0.020 in) long. At the base of the style are four line-shaped scales of 1/2 mm (0.020 in) long.

The young female flower head is oblong to cylinder-shaped and about 1 1/4 cm (0.49 in) long. The involucral leaves are often ivory in colour and may conceal the head. Inflorescences can be either yellow or red. The bract subtending the individual female flower is softly hairy, transversely oblong, about 2 mm (0.079 in) long and 4 mm (0.16 in) broad. The perianth tube of the female flower is covered with long soft hairs, about 2 mm (0.079 in) long, and compressed. The segments in the middle part are about 1 mm (0.039 in) long, line-shaped, and covered with long soft hairs. The four segments in the higher part are 1/3 mm (0.013 in) long, oblong, and covered with long soft hairs. The staminodes are 1/4 mm (0.0098 in) long and line-shaped. The style is hairless, about 3 mm (0.12 in) long, line-shaped but broadening towards the cut-off stigma. The ovary is covered with long soft hairs, compressed oblong in shape, and about 1 mm (0.039 in) long. It is subtended by four line-shaped scales of 1 1/2 mm (0.059 in) long. The mature female head is egg-shaped, 2 1/2–3 1/4 cm (0.98–1.28 in) long, and nearly 2 1/2 cm (0.98 in) across. The mature bracts are covered with densely matted woolly hairs on the outside. The fruits are elliptic, about 4 mm (0.16 in) long, compressed, with a hairless and wrinkled surface.

== Taxonomy ==
The common sunshine conebush was first described by Swedish botanist Peter Jonas Bergius in 1766, who named it Leucadendron salignum. The species name is the Latin adjective salignus "made of willow-wood". Scottish botanist Robert Brown called the species L. adscendens in his 1810 work On the natural order of plants called Proteaceae. Carl Meisner gave it the name L. involucratum in 1856.

A comparison of homologous DNA indicates that L. salignum may be most closely related to L. lanigerum, followed by a clade consisting of L. flexuosum and L. discolor.

It is called common sunshine conebush in English and knoppiesgeelbos in Afrikaans.

== Distribution, habitat and ecology ==
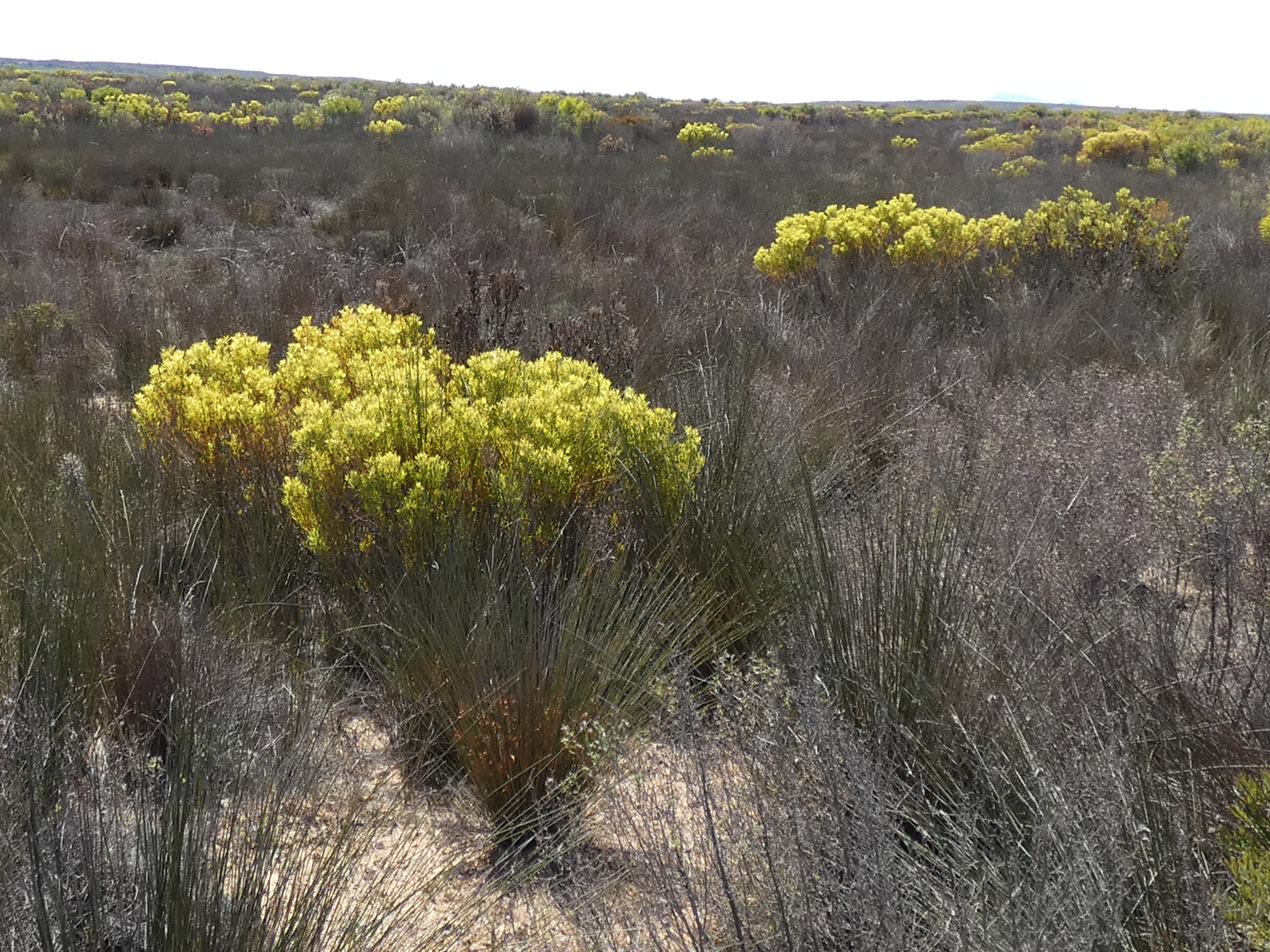
Leucadendron salignum in vegetation with large tufts of Restionaceae, on Avontuur estate, northwest of Nieuwoudtville

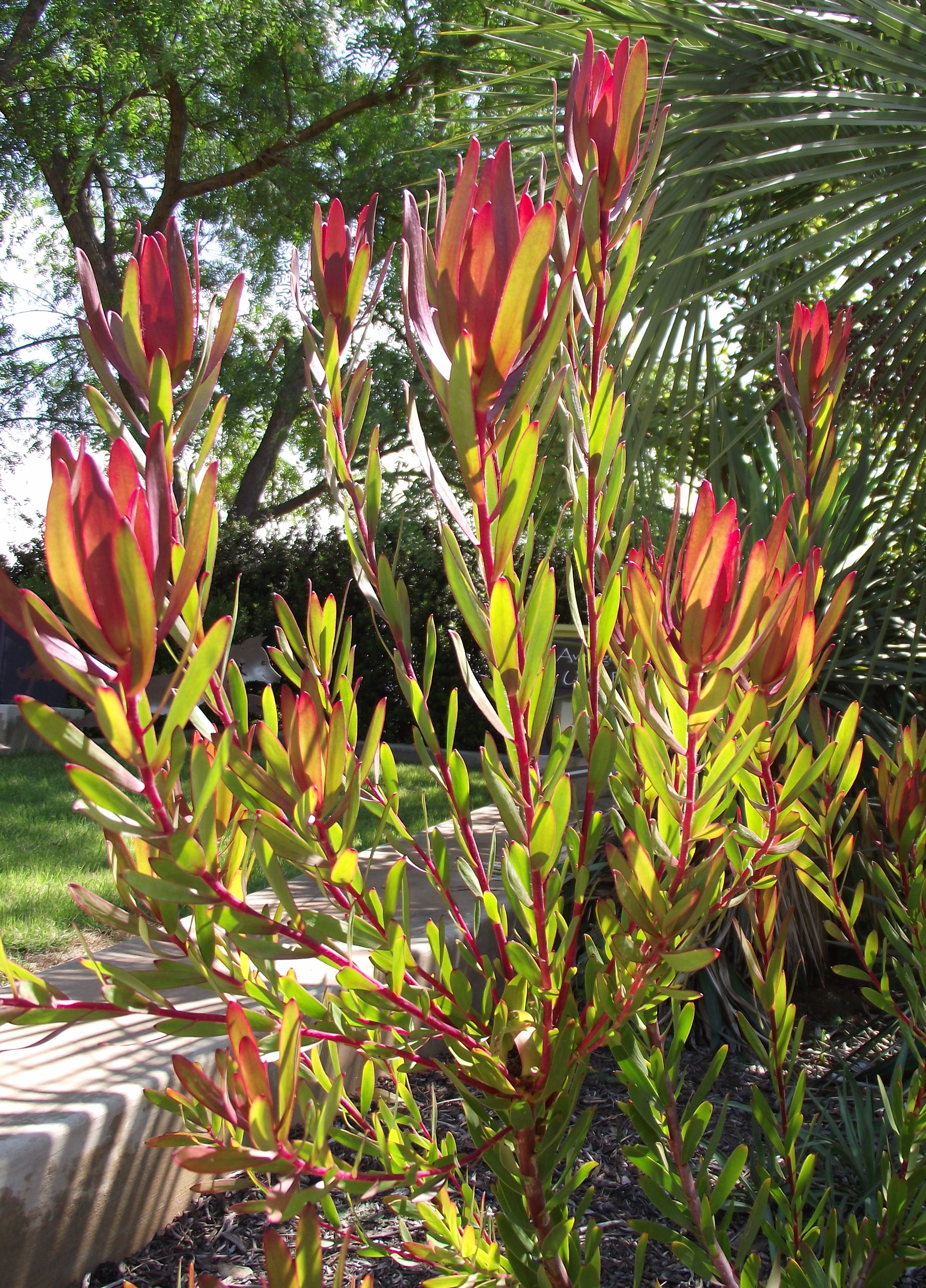
Leucadendron salignum×laureolum 'Rising Sun', a commercially grown cultivar

The common sunshine conebush is a widespread and common species found from Nieuwoudtville in the north to the Cape Peninsula in the southwest and Grahamstown in the east. It copes with a wide range of soil types, and can be found from sea level to about 2,000 metres (6,600 ft) altitude.

Like all Leucadendron species, L. salignum has separate male and female plants. This species is pollinated by small beetles, including the sap beetle species Pria cinerascens and the Adonis ladybird (Hippodamia variegata). The winged seeds remain in the cone on the female plant for many years on end, until they are released after a fire kills the above ground biomass. The mature plants usually do not die, but regrow from the underground rootstock.

== Uses ==
Leucadendron salignum can readily adapt to different soil types in gardens and is frost tolerant to −9 °C (16 °F). It has a very long flowering season, that stretches from May to December and a colourful involucre that surrounds the flower heads. It also regrows well in response to deep pruning, and this species and several of its hybrids and cultivars are widely used for cut foliage production.

Leucadendron ‘Safari Sunset' is a hybrid bred from a red form of L. salignum and L. laureolum. First bred in New Zealand in the 1960s, it is grown commercially in Israel and exported worldwide as a cut flower.
