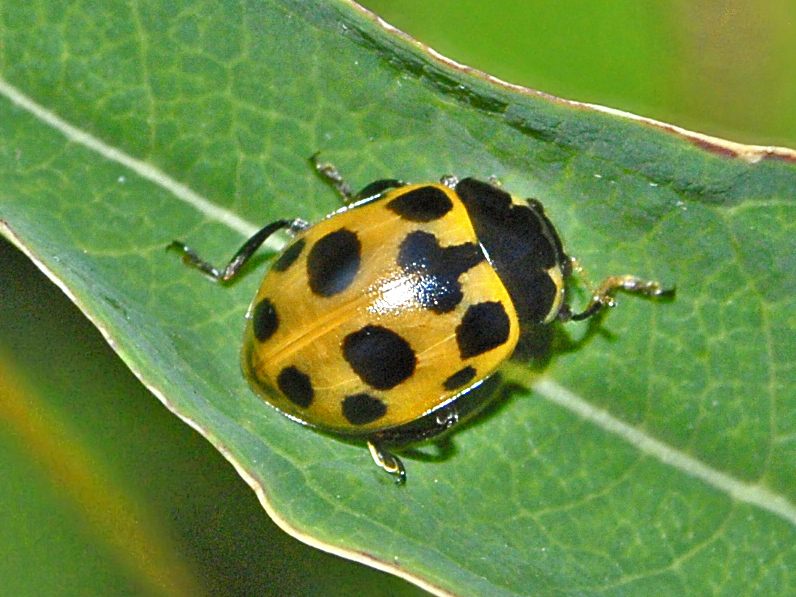
- Adult of Hippodamia notata

Scientific classification
- Kingdom: Animalia
- Phylum: Arthropoda
- Clade: Pancrustacea
- Class: Insecta
- Order: Coleoptera
- Suborder: Polyphaga
- Infraorder: Cucujiformia
- Family: Coccinellidae
- Genus: Hippodamia
- Species: H. notata

Binomial name
- Hippodamia notata (Laicharting, 1781)

Synonyms
- Ceratomegilla notata (Laicharting, 1781); Coccinella notata Laicharting, 1781; Semiadalia notata (Laicharting, 1781)

= Hippodamia notata =

Species of beetle

Hippodamia notata is a species of ladybird belonging to the family Coccinellidae.

== Varieties ==
- Hippodamia notata var. c-nigrum Della Beffa
- Hippodamia notata var. elongata Weise
- Hippodamia notata var. quinquesignata Friv.

== Description ==
Hippodamia notata can reach a length of 4.5–5.5 millimetres (0.18–0.22 in). Adults have domed backs, mainly oval, with short legs and antennae. Pronotum is predominantly black, with white markings on the front edge. This species exhibits a remarkable variability of elytral color patterns. Elytra may be yellow-orange to red and wear large black spots. The legs are black, partially brown, the antennae are also brown. The larvae are slightly flattened and covered with miniature spines.

== Distribution ==
This species is present in most of Europe, in the East Palearctic ecozone and in the Near East. It mainly inhabits forest edges and clearings.

== Biology ==
Like most ladybugs, this species feeds on the larvae and adults of aphids.

== Gallery ==
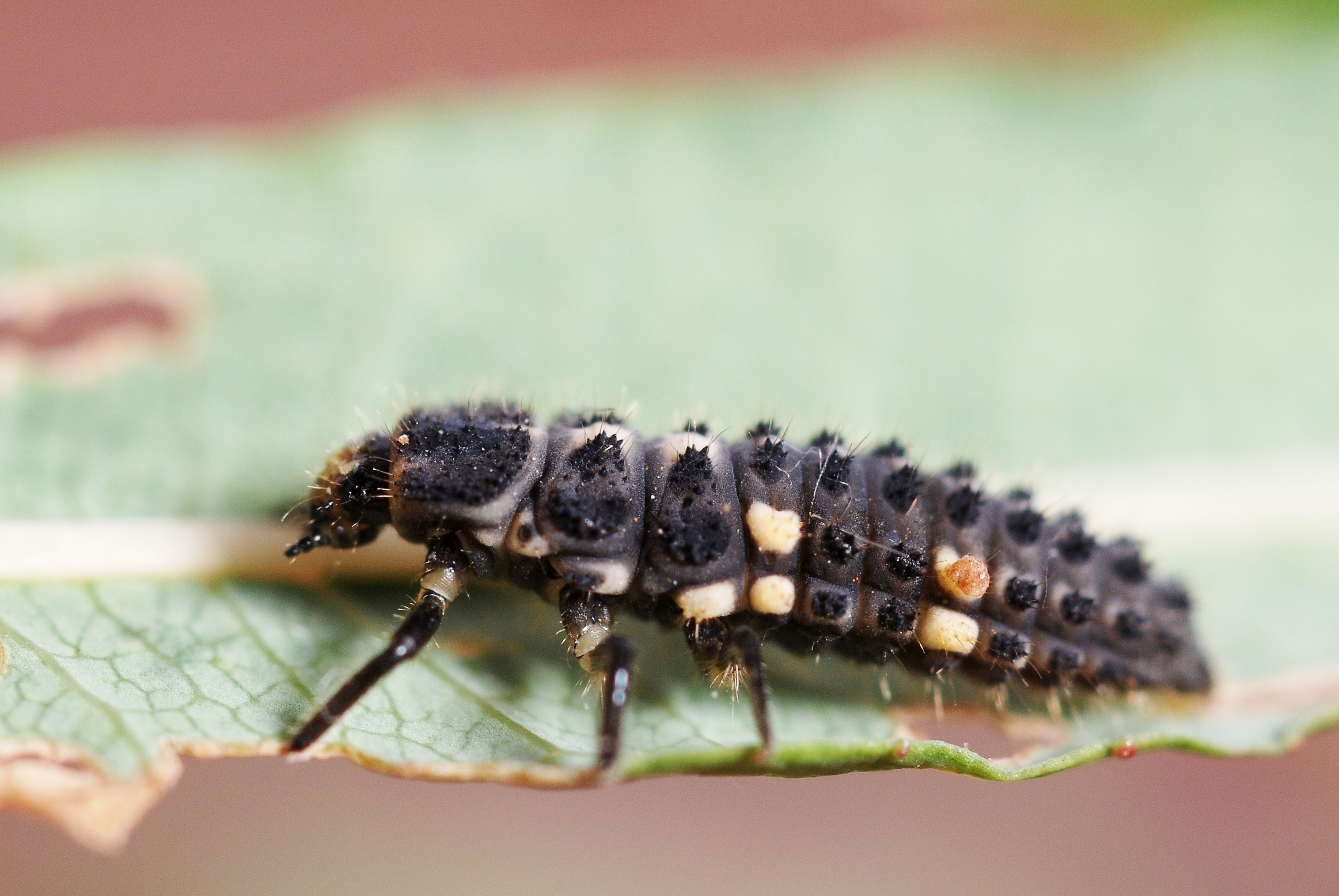
Larva

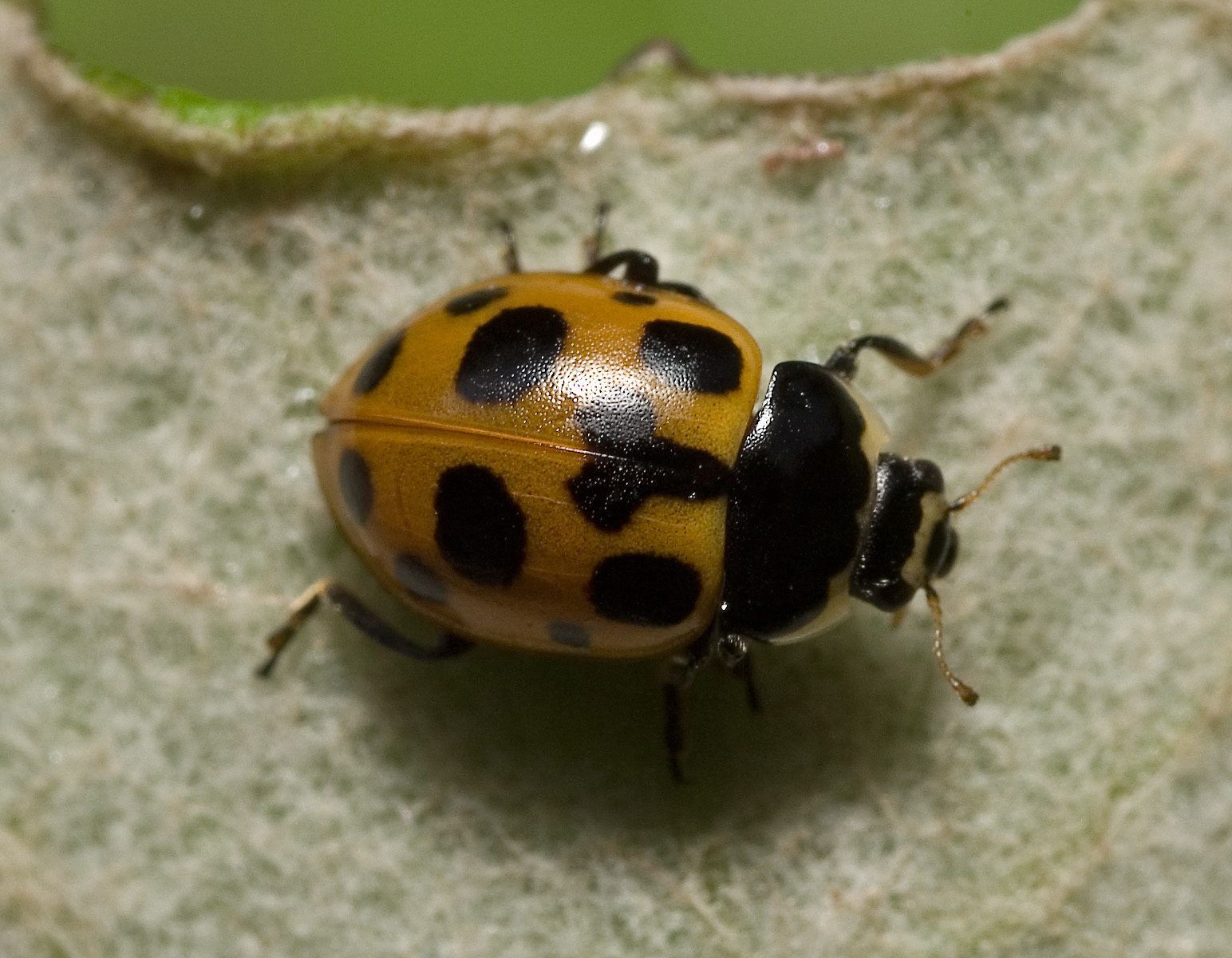
Orange variant

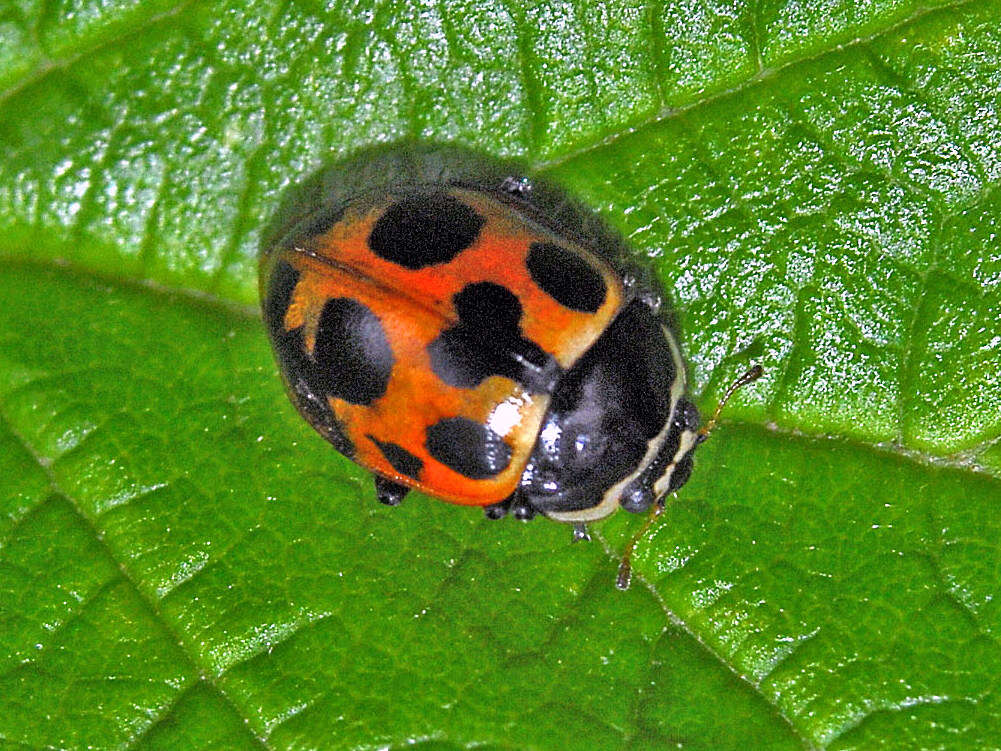
Red variant

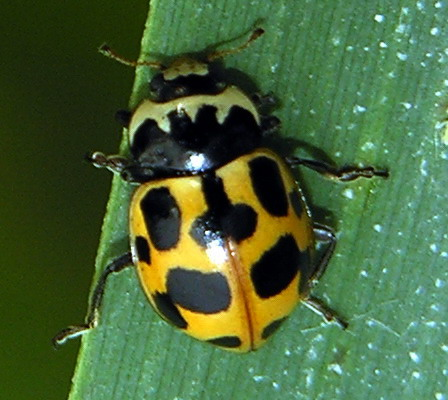
Yellow variant

== Bibliography ==
- Georg Möller, Reiner Grube, Ekkehard Wachmann: Der Fauna Käferführer I - Käfer im und am Wald Fauna-Verlag, Nottuln 2006, ISBN 3-935980-25-6.
