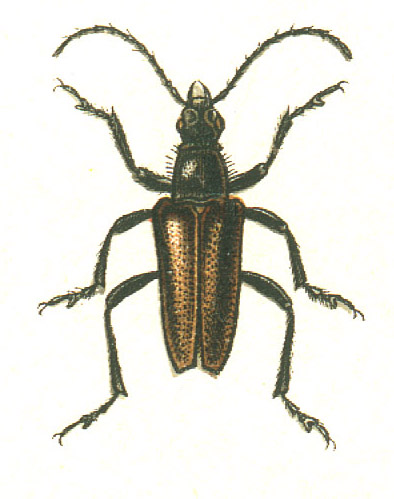
- Gnathacmaeops pratensis

Scientific classification
- Domain: Eukaryota
- Kingdom: Animalia
- Phylum: Arthropoda
- Class: Insecta
- Order: Coleoptera
- Suborder: Polyphaga
- Infraorder: Cucujiformia
- Family: Cerambycidae
- Subfamily: Lepturinae
- Tribe: Rhagiini
- Genus: Gnathacmaeops; Linsley & Chemsak, 1972

= Gnathacmaeops =

Species of beetle

Gnathacmaeops is a genus of beetles in the family Cerambycidae. It has only two species.

== Species ==
- Gnathacmaeops brachypterus (K. Daniel & J. Daniel, 1898)
- Gnathacmaeops pratensis (Laicharting, 1784)
