= Hippodamia expurgata =

Scientific classification
- Kingdom: Animalia
- Phylum: Arthropoda
- Clade: Pancrustacea
- Class: Insecta
- Order: Coleoptera
- Suborder: Polyphaga
- Infraorder: Cucujiformia
- Family: Coccinellidae
- Genus: Hippodamia
- Species: H. expurgata

Binomial name
- Hippodamia expurgata Casey, 1908

Synonyms
- Hippodamia parenthesis expurgata Casey, 1908

Species of beetle

Hippodamia expurgata, the expurgate lady beetle, is a species of lady beetle in the family Coccinellidae. It is found in North America, where it has been recorded from Saskatchewan to New Mexico, west to Yukon and Arizona.

== Description ==
Adults reach a length of about 3.5-5 mm. The colour pattern is similar to that of Hippodamia apicalis, but the sutural spot on the elytron is sometimes missing.
