= Hippodamia washingtoni =

Scientific classification
- Kingdom: Animalia
- Phylum: Arthropoda
- Clade: Pancrustacea
- Class: Insecta
- Order: Coleoptera
- Suborder: Polyphaga
- Infraorder: Cucujiformia
- Family: Coccinellidae
- Genus: Hippodamia
- Species: H. washingtoni

Binomial name
- Hippodamia washingtoni Timberlake, 1939

Species of beetle

Hippodamia washingtoni, or Washington's lady beetle, is a species of lady beetle in the family Coccinellidae. It is found in North America, where it has been recorded from Idaho, Oregon, Washington and British Columbia.

== Description ==
Adults reach a length of about 5.40-6.70 mm.
