= Hippodamia quindecimmaculata =

Scientific classification
- Kingdom: Animalia
- Phylum: Arthropoda
- Clade: Pancrustacea
- Class: Insecta
- Order: Coleoptera
- Suborder: Polyphaga
- Infraorder: Cucujiformia
- Family: Coccinellidae
- Genus: Hippodamia
- Species: H. quindecimmaculata

Binomial name
- Hippodamia quindecimmaculata Mulsant, 1850

Species of beetle

Hippodamia quindecimmaculata is a species of lady beetle in the family Coccinellidae. It is found in North America, where it has been recorded from Ontario, Saskatchewan, illinois, Iowa, Louisiana, Missouri, Nebraska, Ohio, Oklahoma and Wisconsin.

== Description ==
Adults reach a length of about 5-7 mm. The pronotum has pale spots and the elytron is heavily maculate.
