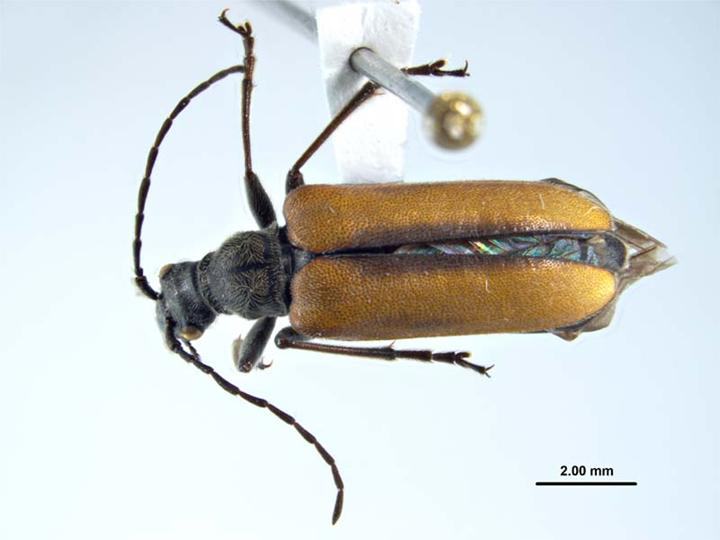

Scientific classification
- Kingdom: Animalia
- Phylum: Arthropoda
- Clade: Pancrustacea
- Class: Insecta
- Order: Coleoptera
- Suborder: Polyphaga
- Infraorder: Cucujiformia
- Family: Cerambycidae
- Genus: Acmaeops
- Species: A. proteus

Binomial name
- Acmaeops proteus (Kirby in Richardson, 1837)

Synonyms
- Acmaeops aurora Casey, 1913; Acmaeops cavicollis Leonard, 1928; Acmaeops coloradensis Casey, 1913; Acmaeops gibbula LeConte, 1861; Acmaeops lacustrina Casey, 1913; Acmaeops obsoleta Casey, 1913; Acmaeops parkeri Casey, 1913; Acmaeops pinicola Schaeffer, 1908; Acmaeops puncticeps Casey, 1913; Acmaeops scutellata Casey, 1924

= Acmaeops proteus =

Species of beetle

Acmaeops proteus is a species of the Lepturinae subfamily in the long-horned beetle family. This beetle is distributed in Canada, Mexico, and the United States.

Fungi, Paecilomyces farinosus entomopathogenic species parasite on adult beetles.

== Subtaxa ==
There is one varieties in species:

- Acmaeops proteus durangoensis Linsley & Chemsak, 1972
- Acmaeops proteus proteus (Kirby, 1837)
