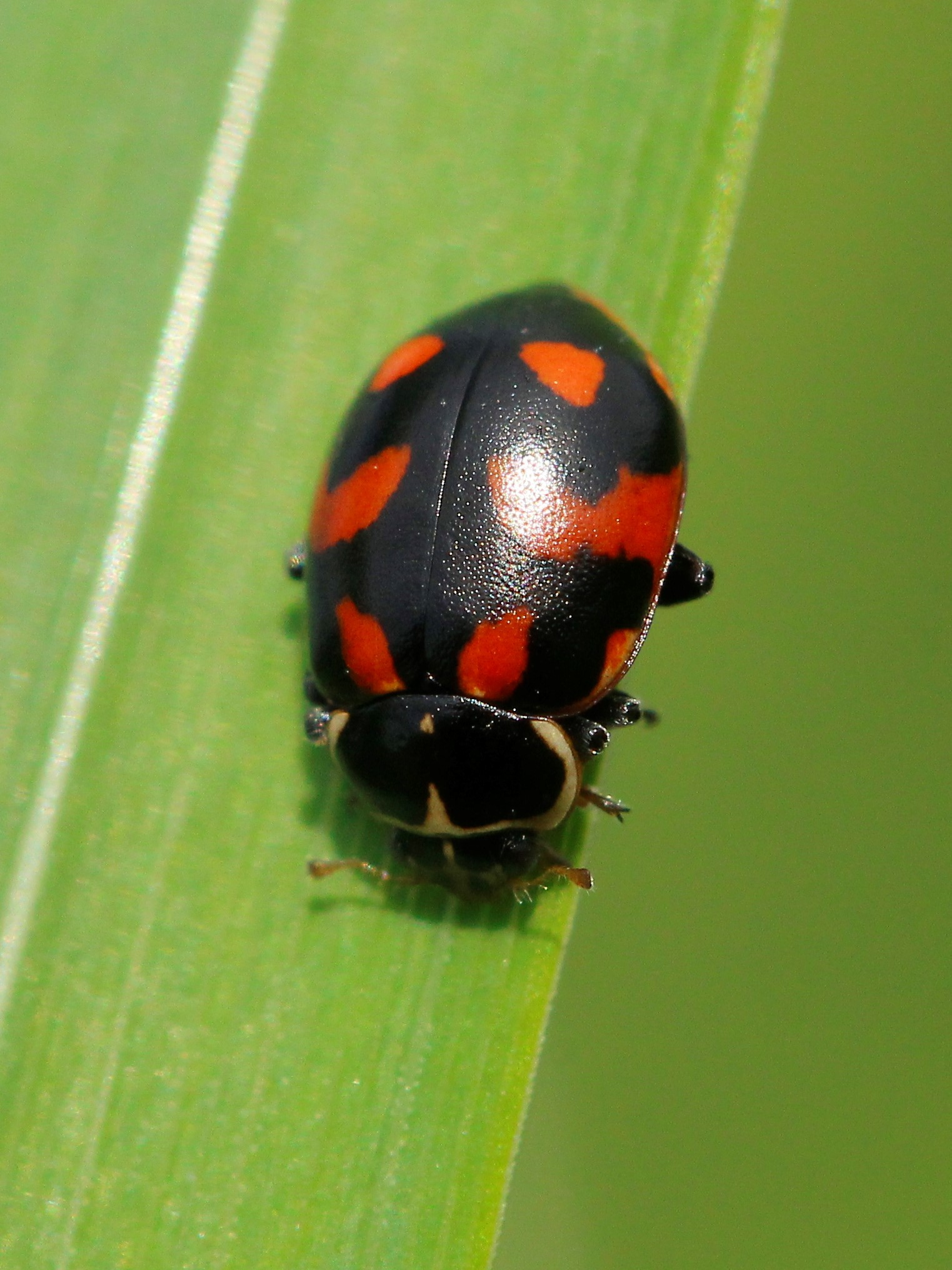

Scientific classification
- Kingdom: Animalia
- Phylum: Arthropoda
- Clade: Pancrustacea
- Class: Insecta
- Order: Coleoptera
- Suborder: Polyphaga
- Infraorder: Cucujiformia
- Family: Coccinellidae
- Genus: Hippodamia
- Species: H. arctica

Binomial name
- Hippodamia arctica (Schneider, 1792)

Synonyms
- Coccinella arctica Schneider, 1792; Coccinella lapponica Thunberg, 1795; Coccinella dubia Weber, 1801; Coccinella amoena Scott, 1933; Hippodamia scalaris Gebler, 1843

= Hippodamia arctica =

Species of beetle

Hippodamia arctica is a species of lady beetle in the family Coccinellidae. It is found in Europe and Northern Asia (excluding China) and North America (British Columbia, Labrador, Yukon and Alaska).

== Description ==
Adults reach a length of about 4-4.5 mm. Adults are black with yellowish red markings.
