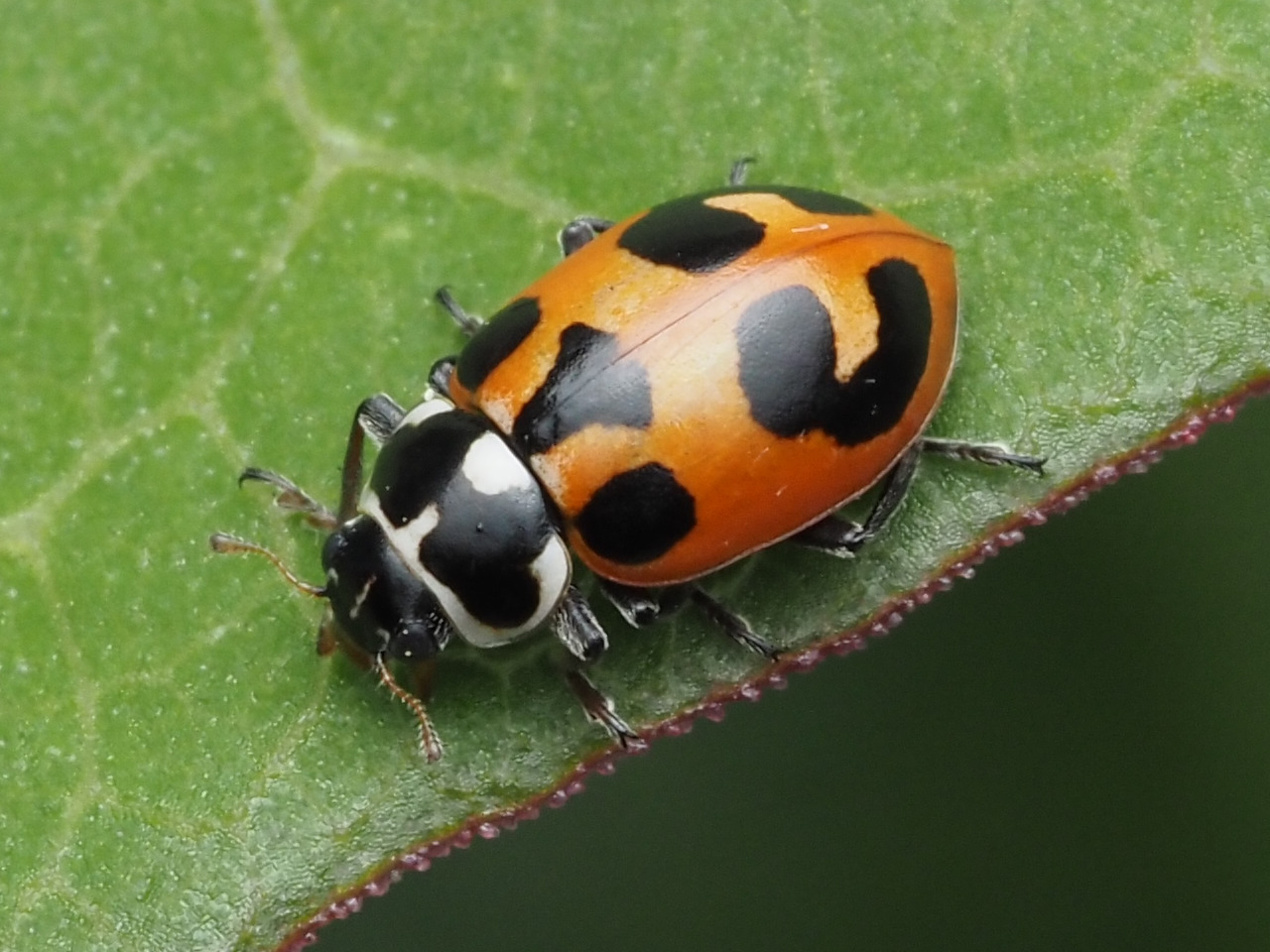

Scientific classification
- Kingdom: Animalia
- Phylum: Arthropoda
- Clade: Pancrustacea
- Class: Insecta
- Order: Coleoptera
- Suborder: Polyphaga
- Infraorder: Cucujiformia
- Family: Coccinellidae
- Genus: Hippodamia
- Species: H. parenthesis

Binomial name
- Hippodamia parenthesis (Say, 1824)

Synonyms
- Coccinella parenthesis Say, 1824; Coccinella tridens Kirby, 1837; Hippodamia parenthesis albomacula Fitch, 1862; Hippodamia parenthesis approximata Fitch, 1862; Hippodamia parenthesis confluenta Fitch, 1862; Hippodamia parenthesis connata Fitch, 1862; Hippodamia parenthesis discopunctata Fitch, 1862; Hippodamia parenthesis insulata Fitch, 1862; Hippodamia parenthesis linearis Fitch, 1862; Hippodamia parenthesis lituricollis Fitch, 1862; Hippodamia parenthesis permacrifrons Fitch, 1862; Hippodamia parenthesis triangularis Fitch, 1862; Hippodamia parenthesis tridentifrons Fitch, 1862; Hippodamia parenthesis nimia Fitch, 1862

= Hippodamia parenthesis =

Species of beetle

Hippodamia parenthesis, the parenthesis lady beetle, is a species of lady beetle in the family Coccinellidae. It is found in North America, where it has been recorded from Nova Scotia to South Carolina, west to Alaska and California.

== Description ==
Adults reach a length of about 3.75-5.60 mm. They have a spotted elytron, with the apical spots often suffused.
