= Hippodamia andrewesi =

Scientific classification
- Kingdom: Animalia
- Phylum: Arthropoda
- Clade: Pancrustacea
- Class: Insecta
- Order: Coleoptera
- Suborder: Polyphaga
- Infraorder: Cucujiformia
- Family: Coccinellidae
- Genus: Hippodamia
- Species: H. andrewesi

Binomial name
- Hippodamia andrewesi (Sicard, 1913)

Synonyms
- Semiadalia andrewesi Sicard, 1913

Species of beetle

Hippodamia andrewesi is a species of beetle of the family Coccinellidae. It is found in India (Himachal Pradesh, Jammu & Kashmir), Pakistan and Afghanistan.

== Description ==
Adults reach a length of about 4–5 mm (0.16–0.20 in). The head is black with a creamy white or yellow macula. The pronotum has a large black macula on the disc and a creamy white or yellow median area. The scutellum is black and the elytra are orange-reddish with a black anchor-shaped marking.
