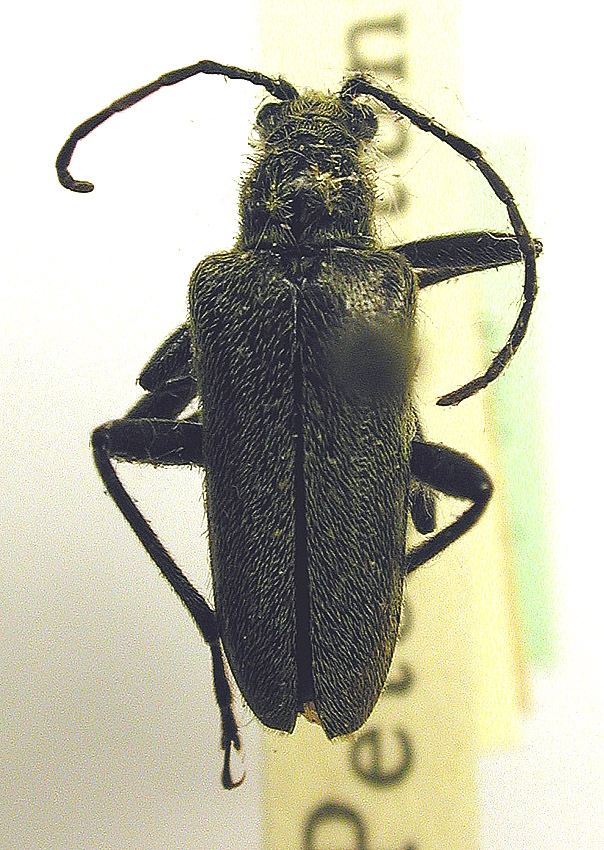

Scientific classification
- Kingdom: Animalia
- Phylum: Arthropoda
- Clade: Pancrustacea
- Class: Insecta
- Order: Coleoptera
- Suborder: Polyphaga
- Infraorder: Cucujiformia
- Family: Cerambycidae
- Genus: Acmaeops
- Species: A. smaragdula

Binomial name
- Acmaeops smaragdula (Fabricius 1793)

Synonyms
- Leptura smaragdina Nazen, 1792; Leptura smaragdula Fabricius, 1792; Acmaeops smaragdulus (Fabricius) Villiers, 1978 (misspelling)

= Acmaeops smaragdula =

Species of beetle

Acmaeops smaragdula is a species of the Lepturinae subfamily in the long-horned beetle family. This beetle is distributed in Belarus, Finland, France, China, Italy, Latvia, Mongolia, Norway, Poland, Russia, Sweden, and Switzerland.

== Subtaxa ==
There is one variety in species:

- Acmaeops smaragdula var. morio (Fabricius, 1792)
