= Hippodamia lunatomaculata =

Scientific classification
- Kingdom: Animalia
- Phylum: Arthropoda
- Clade: Pancrustacea
- Class: Insecta
- Order: Coleoptera
- Suborder: Polyphaga
- Infraorder: Cucujiformia
- Family: Coccinellidae
- Genus: Hippodamia
- Species: H. lunatomaculata

Binomial name
- Hippodamia lunatomaculata Motschulsky, 1845

Species of beetle

Hippodamia lunatomaculata, the crescent lady beetle, is a species of lady beetle in the family Coccinellidae. It is found in North America, where it has been recorded from British Columbia, Oregon, Washington and California.

== Description ==
Adults reach a length of about 4.15-5.60 mm. The colour pattern of the pronotum consists of many spots, while the elytron is lightly maculate.

== Subspecies ==
These two subspecies belong to the species Hippodamia lunatomaculata:

- Hippodamia lunatomaculata dobzhanskyi Chapin, 1946 (British Columbia, Oregon, Washington, California)
- Hippodamia lunatomaculata lunatomaculata Motschulsky, 1845 (California)
