= Hippodamia heydeni =

Scientific classification
- Kingdom: Animalia
- Phylum: Arthropoda
- Clade: Pancrustacea
- Class: Insecta
- Order: Coleoptera
- Suborder: Polyphaga
- Infraorder: Cucujiformia
- Family: Coccinellidae
- Genus: Hippodamia
- Species: H. heydeni

Binomial name
- Hippodamia heydeni (Weise, 1892)

Synonyms
- Semiadalia heydeni Weise in Heyden, 1892; Ceratomegilla heydeni; Semiadalia przevalskii Savoyskaya, 1962

Species of beetle

Hippodamia heydeni is a species of beetle of the family Coccinellidae. It is found in Tibet.

== Description ==
Adults reach a length of about 5–7 mm (0.20–0.28 in). The head is yellow anteriorly and black posteriorly, with a v-shaped emargination. The pronotum has a black discal macula, and yellowish antero-and posterolateral areas. The colour pattern is variable.
