= Acmaeops discoideus =

Scientific classification
- Domain: Eukaryota
- Kingdom: Animalia
- Phylum: Arthropoda
- Class: Insecta
- Order: Coleoptera
- Suborder: Polyphaga
- Infraorder: Cucujiformia
- Family: Cerambycidae
- Genus: Acmaeops
- Species: A. discoideus

Binomial name
- Acmaeops discoideus (Haldeman, 1847)

Synonyms
- Pachyta discoidea Haldeman, 1847; Acmaeops discoidea (Haldeman) LeConte, 1850

Species of beetle

Acmaeops discoideus is a long-horned beetle in the flower longhorn subfamily, Lepturinae. It is found in the United States and Canada, and feeds on Virginia pine.

Acmaeops discoideus has been spelled Acmaeops discoidea, but Acmaeops discoideus is now considered the accepted name.
