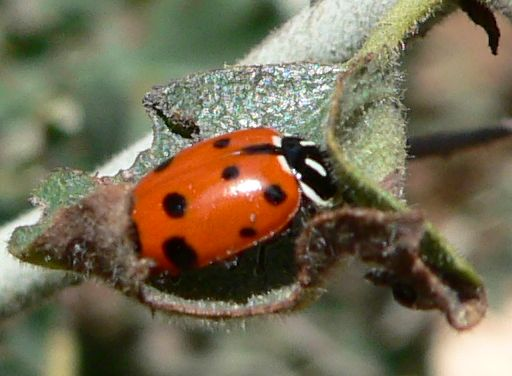
- Hippodamia convergens

Scientific classification
- Kingdom: Animalia
- Phylum: Arthropoda
- Clade: Pancrustacea
- Class: Insecta
- Order: Coleoptera
- Suborder: Polyphaga
- Infraorder: Cucujiformia
- Family: Coccinellidae
- Tribe: Coccinellini
- Genus: Hippodamia; Dejean, 1837

Synonyms
- Hemispaerica Hope, 1840; Adonia Mulsant, 1846

= Hippodamia (beetle) =

Genus of beetles

Hippodamia is a genus of ladybirds in the family Coccinellidae. It includes the most common native North American "ladybug", H. convergens, which can form overwintering aggregations numbering in the millions. Another notable member is Hippodamia variegata, which occurs widely over both the North and South Hemispheres.

Members of the genus tend to share an elongated body form with red or orange elytra, and a black and white pronotum. Many species, particularly in North America, are highly variable to the extent that they cannot be separated without dissection in many cases.

== Species ==
- Hippodamia americana Crotch, 1873 - American Lady Beetle
- Hippodamia andrewesi (Sicard, 1913)
- Hippodamia apicalis Casey, 1899
- Hippodamia arctica (Schneider, 1792)
- Hippodamia caseyi Johnson, 1910 - Casey's Lady Beetle
- Hippodamia convergens Guérin-Méneville, 1842 - Convergent Lady Beetle
- Hippodamia expurgata Casey, 1908
- Hippodamia falcigera Crotch, 1873
- Hippodamia glacialis (Fabricius, 1775) - Glacial Lady Beetle
- Hippodamia heydeni (Weise, 1892)
- Hippodamia koebelei Timberlake, 1942
- Hippodamia lunatomaculata Motschulsky, 1845
- Hippodamia moesta LeConte, 1854 - Sorrowful Lady Beetle
- Hippodamia oregonensis Crotch, 1873
- Hippodamia parenthesis (Say, 1824) - Parenthesis Lady Beetle
- Hippodamia quindecimmaculata Mulsant, 1850 - Barred Lady Beetle
- Hippodamia quinquesignata (Kirby, 1837) - Five-spotted Lady Beetle
- Hippodamia racemosa Mulsant, 1853
- Hippodamia septemmaculata (DeGeer, 1775)
- Hippodamia sinuata Mulsant, 1850
- Hippodamia tredecimpunctata (Linnaeus, 1758) - Thirteen-spotted Lady Beetle
- Hippodamia variegata (Goeze, 1777)
- Hippodamia washingtoni Timberlake, 1939 - Washington's Lady Beetle

== Selected former species ==
- Hippodamia notata (Laicharting, 1781) is now Ceratomegilla notata.
