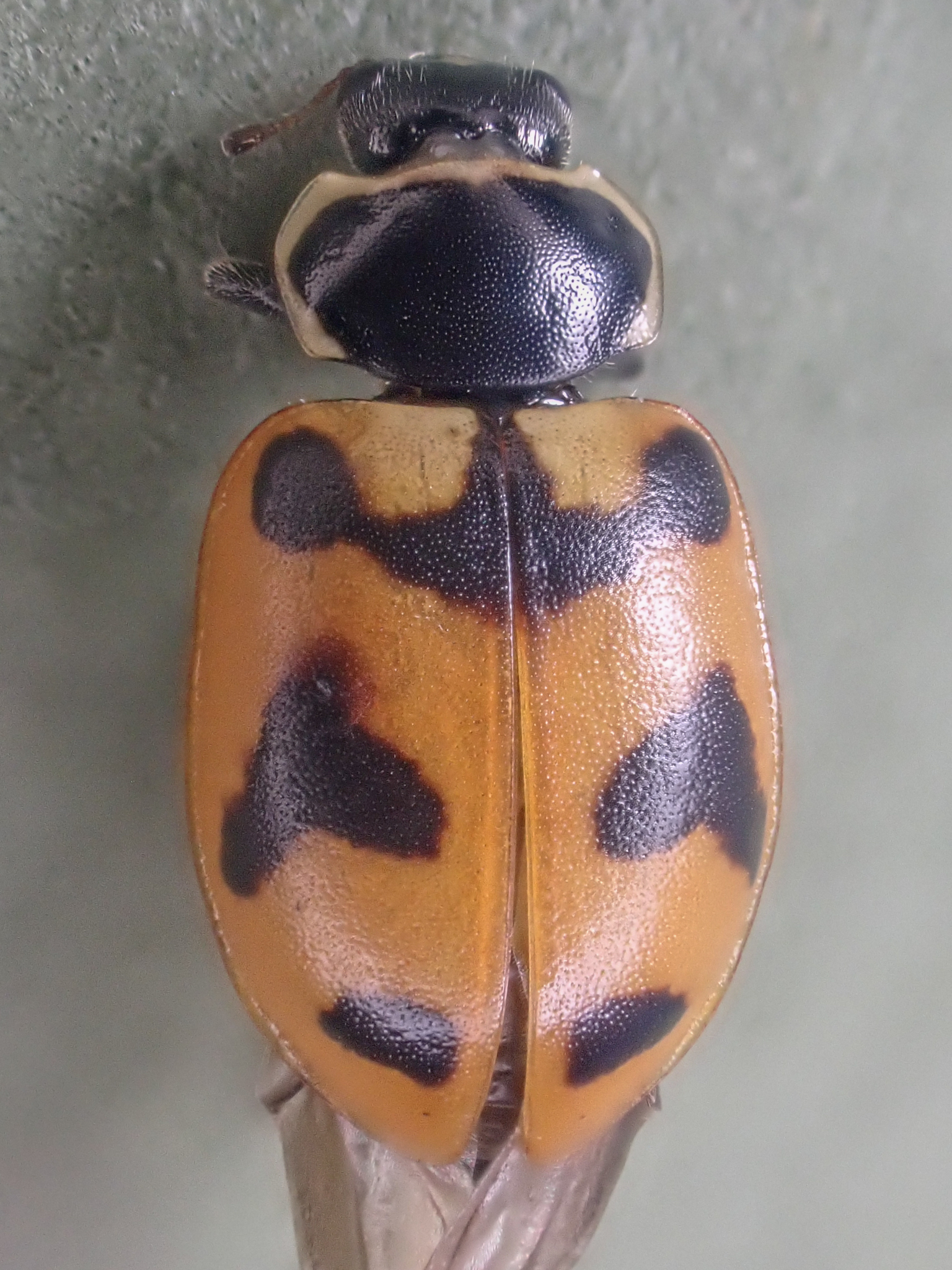

Scientific classification
- Kingdom: Animalia
- Phylum: Arthropoda
- Clade: Pancrustacea
- Class: Insecta
- Order: Coleoptera
- Suborder: Polyphaga
- Infraorder: Cucujiformia
- Family: Coccinellidae
- Genus: Hippodamia
- Species: H. oregonensis

Binomial name
- Hippodamia oregonensis Crotch, 1873

Synonyms
- Hippodamia puncticollis Casey, 1899; Hippodamia dispar Casey, 1899; Hippodamia liliputana Casey, 1908; Hippodamia cockerelli Johnson, 1910

= Hippodamia oregonensis =

Species of beetle

Hippodamia oregonensis, the oregon lady beetle, is a species of lady beetle in the family Coccinellidae. It is found in North America, where it has been recorded from Alberta, British Columbia, Colorado, Oregon, Utah and Washington.

== Description ==
Adults reach a length of about 4-5 mm. The pronotum is black with yellow lateral and apical borders. The elytron has black spots.
