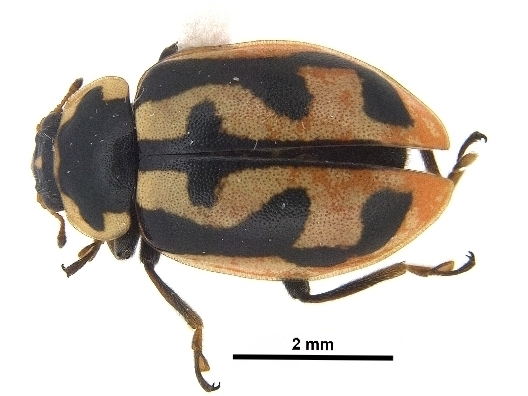

Scientific classification
- Kingdom: Animalia
- Phylum: Arthropoda
- Clade: Pancrustacea
- Class: Insecta
- Order: Coleoptera
- Suborder: Polyphaga
- Infraorder: Cucujiformia
- Family: Coccinellidae
- Genus: Hippodamia
- Species: H. americana

Binomial name
- Hippodamia americana Crotch, 1873

= Hippodamia americana =

Species of beetle

Hippodamia americana, the American lady beetle, is a species of lady beetle in the family Coccinellidae. It is found in North America, where it has been recorded from Alberta, British Columbia, Manitoba, the Northwest Territories, Ontario, Saskatchewan and Wisconsin.

== Description ==
Adults reach a length of about 4.40-5.10 mm.
