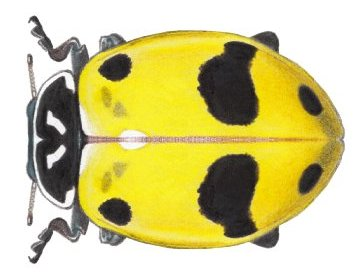

Scientific classification
- Kingdom: Animalia
- Phylum: Arthropoda
- Clade: Pancrustacea
- Class: Insecta
- Order: Coleoptera
- Suborder: Polyphaga
- Infraorder: Cucujiformia
- Family: Coccinellidae
- Genus: Hippodamia
- Species: H. glacialis

Binomial name
- Hippodamia glacialis (Fabricius, 1775)

Synonyms
- Coccinella glacialis Fabricius, 1775; Coccinella abbreviata Fabricius, 1787; Coccinella remota Weber, 1801; Hippodamia extensa Mulsant, 1850; Hippodamia lecontii Mulsant, 1850; Hippodamia hoppingi Nunenmacher, 1934; Hippodamia glacialis mackenziei Chapin, 1946

= Hippodamia glacialis =

Species of beetle

Hippodamia glacialis, the glacial lady beetle, is a species of lady beetle in the family Coccinellidae. It is found in North America.

== Subspecies ==
These subspecies belong to the species Hippodamia glacialis:

- Hippodamia glacialis glacialis (Quebec to South Carolina and Alabama, west to Saskatchewan and Colorado)
- Hippodamia glacialis extensa Mulsant, 1850 (California)
- Hippodamia glacialis lecontei Mulsant, 1850 (Saskatchewan to New Mexico, west to Alberta and California)
