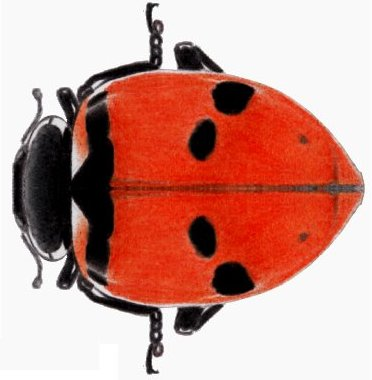

Scientific classification
- Kingdom: Animalia
- Phylum: Arthropoda
- Clade: Pancrustacea
- Class: Insecta
- Order: Coleoptera
- Suborder: Polyphaga
- Infraorder: Cucujiformia
- Family: Coccinellidae
- Genus: Hippodamia
- Species: H. quinquesignata

Binomial name
- Hippodamia quinquesignata (Kirby, 1837)

Synonyms
- Coccinella quinquesignata Kirby, 1837; Hippodamia mulsanti LeConte, 1852; Hippodamia ambigua LeConte, 1852; Hippodamia punctulata LeConte, 1852; Hippodamia leporina Mulsant, 1856; Hippodamia subsimilis Casey, 1899; Hippodamia vernix Casey, 1899; Hippodamia obliqua Casey, 1899; Hippodamia uteana Casey, 1908; Hippodamia coccinea Casey, 1908

= Hippodamia quinquesignata =

Species of beetle

Hippodamia quinquesignata, the five-spotted lady beetle, is a species of lady beetle in the family Coccinellidae. It is found in North America.

== Description ==
Adults reach a length of about 4-7 mm. In subspecies quinquesignata, the pronotum sometimes has convergent pale spots. The colour pattern of the elytron is extremely variable. Subspecies ambigua is usually, but not always, spotless.

== Subspecies ==
These subspecies belong to the species Hippodamia quinquesignata:

- Hippodamia quinquesignata ambigua LeConte, 1852 (southern British Columbia to southern California, west of the Sierra Nevada)
- Hippodamia quinquesignata quinquesignata (Kirby, 1837) (Prince Edward Island to Yukon Territory and Alaska, south to New Mexico and California)

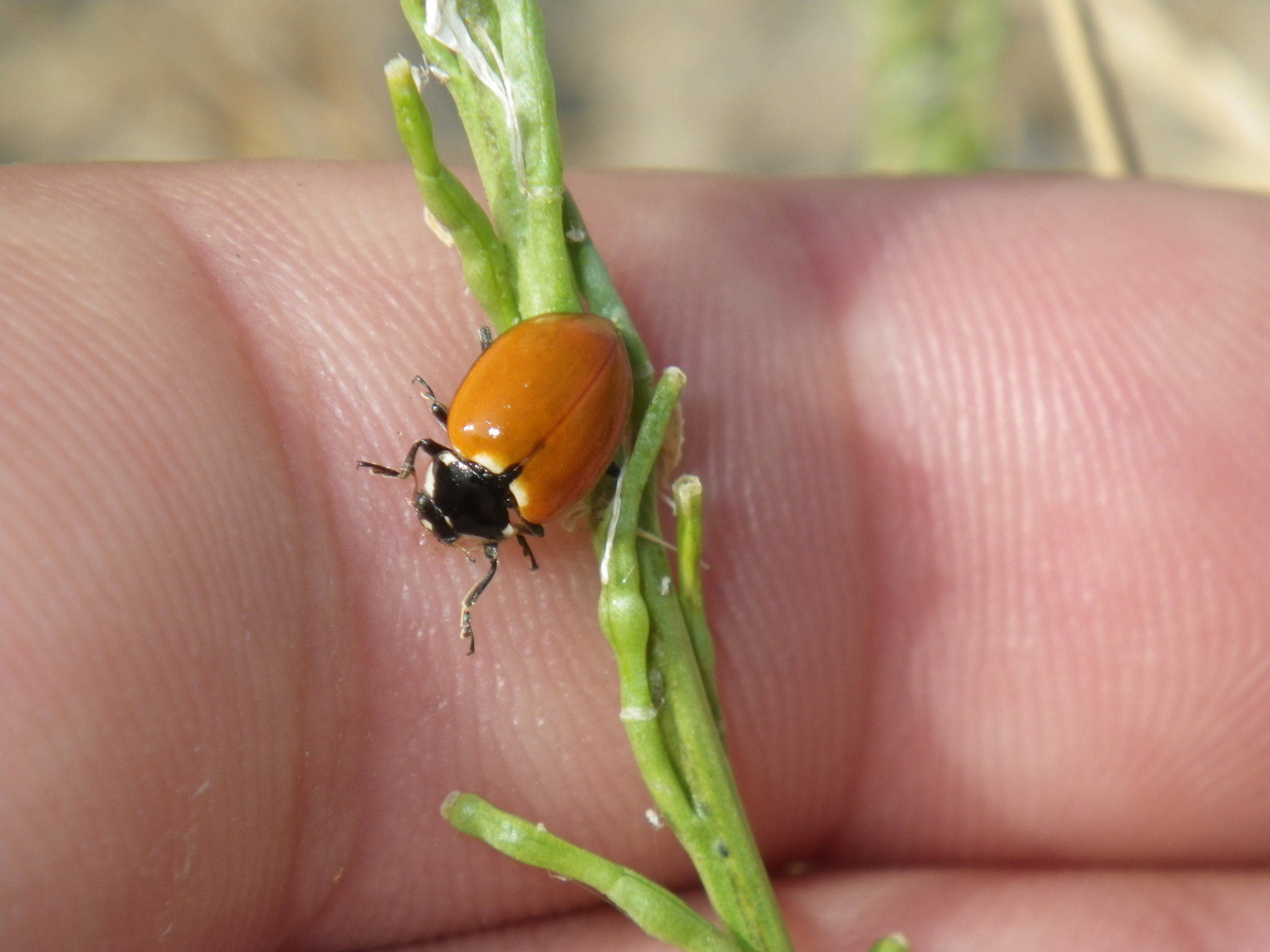
Hippodamia quinquesignata ambigua
