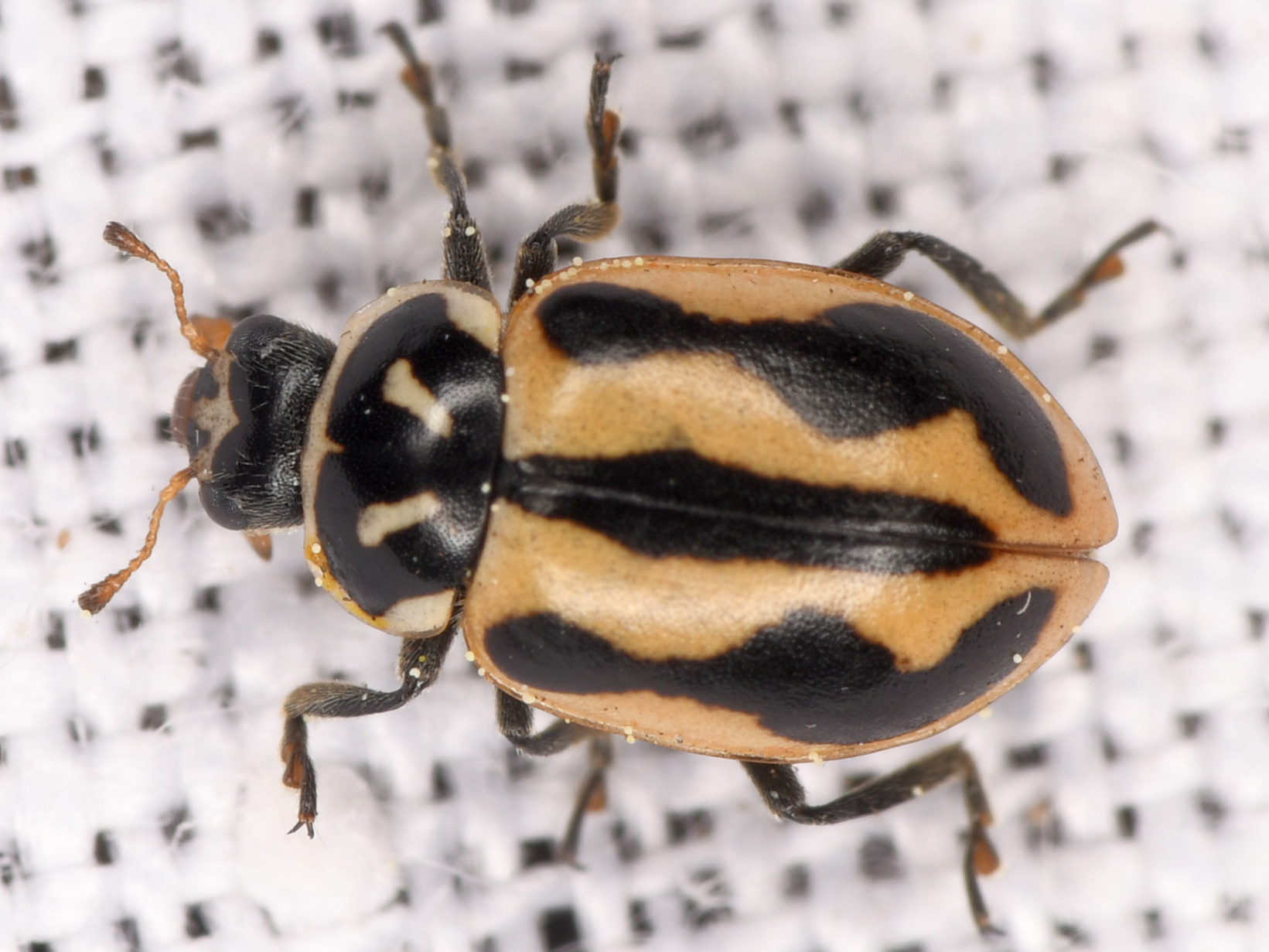

Scientific classification
- Kingdom: Animalia
- Phylum: Arthropoda
- Clade: Pancrustacea
- Class: Insecta
- Order: Coleoptera
- Suborder: Polyphaga
- Infraorder: Cucujiformia
- Family: Coccinellidae
- Genus: Hippodamia
- Species: H. sinuata

Binomial name
- Hippodamia sinuata Mulsant, 1850

Synonyms
- Adonia interrogans Mulsant, 1856; Hippodamia spuria LeConte, 1861; Hippodamia crotchi Casey, 1899; Hippodamia complex Casey, 1899; Hippodamia trivittata Casey, 1899; Hippodamia americana fontinalis Casey, 1924; Hippodamia sinuata disjuncta Timberlake, 1919; Hippodamia sinuata straminea Chapin, 1946

= Hippodamia sinuata =

Species of beetle

Hippodamia sinuata, the sinuate lady beetle, is a species of lady beetle in the family Coccinellidae. It is found in North America and Oceania.

== Description ==
Adults reach a length of about 4.30-5.80 mm. The pronotum has pale spots. The suture on the elytron is black from the base to the apical three-fourth and there is a broad discal vitta.

== Subspecies ==
These subspecies belong to the species Hippodamia sinuata:

- Hippodamia sinuata crotchi Casey, 1899 (Northwest Territories south to New Mexico and California)
- Hippodamia sinuata sinuata Mulsant, 1850 (California)
- Hippodamia sinuata spuria LeConte, 1861 (Alaska to Oregon)
