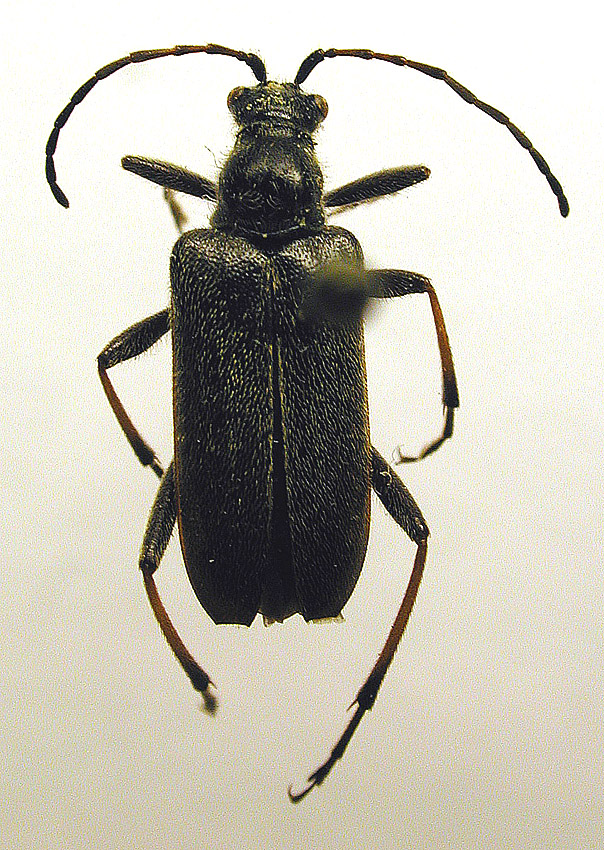

Scientific classification
- Kingdom: Animalia
- Phylum: Arthropoda
- Clade: Pancrustacea
- Class: Insecta
- Order: Coleoptera
- Suborder: Polyphaga
- Infraorder: Cucujiformia
- Family: Cerambycidae
- Genus: Acmaeops
- Species: A. marginata

Binomial name
- Acmaeops marginata (Fabricius, 1781)

Synonyms
- Acmaeops marginatus var. seminiger Schaeffer, 1965; Acmaeops marginatus var. totusniger Demelt, 1966; Leptura marginata Fabricius, 1781 nec Müller, 1766; Acmaeops marginatus (Fabricius) Villiers, 1978 (misspelling)

= Acmaeops marginata =

Species of beetle

Acmaeops marginata is a species of the Lepturinae subfamily in the longhorn beetle family. It was described by Johan Christian Fabricius in 1781 and is known from Austria, Belarus, Belgium, Baltic states, Bosnia and Herzegovina, Croatia, Czech Republic, Finland, France, Germany, Greece, Italy, Norway, Poland, Russia, Serbia, Slovakia, Spain, Sweden, Switzerland, Ukraine, China, Mongolia, and Montenegro. Adult beetle feeds on Scots pine, and Norway spruce.

== Description ==
Adults of this species are brown-black in colour and 7–11 millimetres (0.28–0.43 in) long. They fly from May to June during which months they feed on various Pinus species.

== Subtaxa ==
There are three varieties in species:

- Acmaeops marginata var. bicoloripes Pic
- Acmaeops marginata var. immarginata Plavilstshikov
- Acmaeops marginata var. spadicea Pic, 1904
