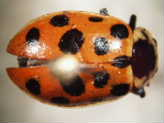

Conservation status
- Secure (NatureServe)

Scientific classification
- Kingdom: Animalia
- Phylum: Arthropoda
- Clade: Pancrustacea
- Class: Insecta
- Order: Coleoptera
- Suborder: Polyphaga
- Infraorder: Cucujiformia
- Family: Coccinellidae
- Genus: Hippodamia
- Species: H. tredecimpunctata

Binomial name
- Hippodamia tredecimpunctata (Linnaeus, 1758)

Synonyms
- Coccinella tredecimpunctata Linnaeus, 1758; Coccinella undecimmaculata Harrer, 1784; Coccinella trinacris Geoffroy, 1785; Coccinella vittata Goeze, 1777; Coccinella quatuordecimpunctata Donovan, 1793; Coccinella tibialis Say, 1824; Coccinella signata Ménétries, 1832 (preocc.); Hippodamia xanthoptera Mulsant, 1850; Hippodamia signata Faldermann, 1837; Coccinella padana Comolli, 1837; Hippodamia impictipennis Fairmaire, 1876; Hippodamia eichhoffii Seidlitz, 1891

= Hippodamia tredecimpunctata =

Thirteen-spotted lady beetle

Species of beetle

Hippodamia tredecimpunctata, commonly known as the thirteen-spot ladybeetle, is a species of lady beetle.

== Description ==
Adult H. tredecimpunctata have domed backs, mainly oval, often shiny with short legs and antennae. They have two wing covers. They are usually red to orange in color. This species has thirteen dark or black spots. The larvae are slightly flattened and covered with miniature spines. Very small eggs are laid in groups of 10–50 on the undersides of leaves.

== Range ==
The species is distributed throughout much of the northern hemisphere - Europe, North Africa, European Russia, the Caucasus, Siberia, the Russian Far East, Belarus, Ukraine, Moldova, Transcaucasia, Kazakhstan, Middle Asia, Western Asia, Afghanistan, Mongolia, China, the Korean Peninsula, Japan, and North America. In North America, it can be found in Canada and the northern United States. The relative abundance of this species has decreased in many regions (midwestern US, Maine, Quebec, and New Brunswick) following the introduction of the non-native ladybeetle Coccinella septempunctata. On the other hand, H. tredecimpunctata appears to coexist with non-native ladybeetles in Manitoba and Ontario.

== Habitat ==
It is a stenotypic (limited habitat) species most associated with wet meadows, lakesides, flood plains and river deltas, marshes, marshy alder thickets, carr, and bodden; on Carex, Sparganium, Phragmites, and Salix.

== Biology ==
It feeds on Aphis farinosa on grasses and sedges associated with Sipha glyceriae, and on aphids associated with Gramineae, Umbelliferae, and some other plants. It also feeds on Erysiphales on reeds, before the emergence of aphids. It has also been found on cane, rotten hay, detritus, and under peeled-off bark.

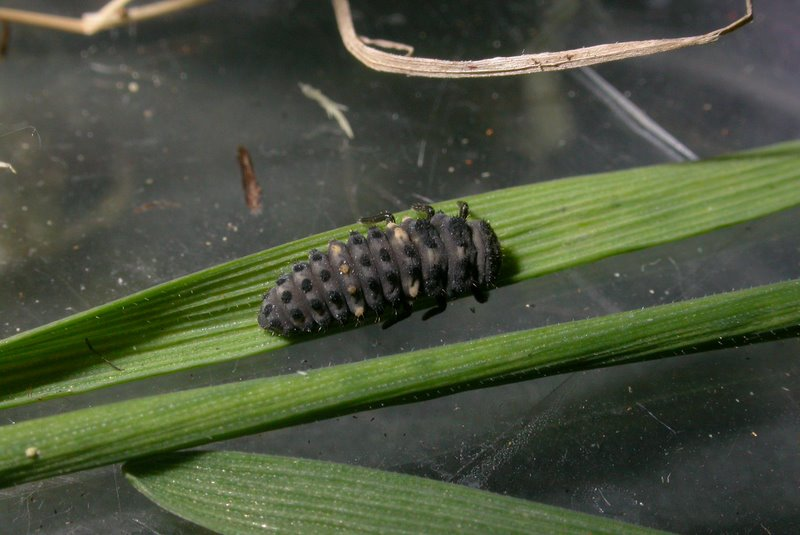
Larva

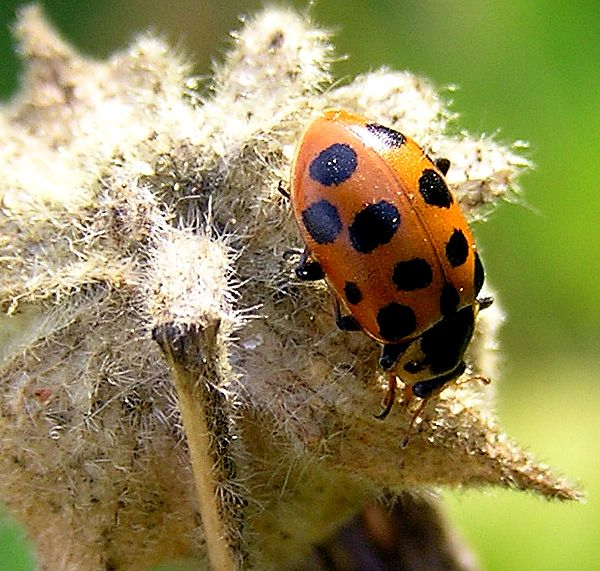
Adult
