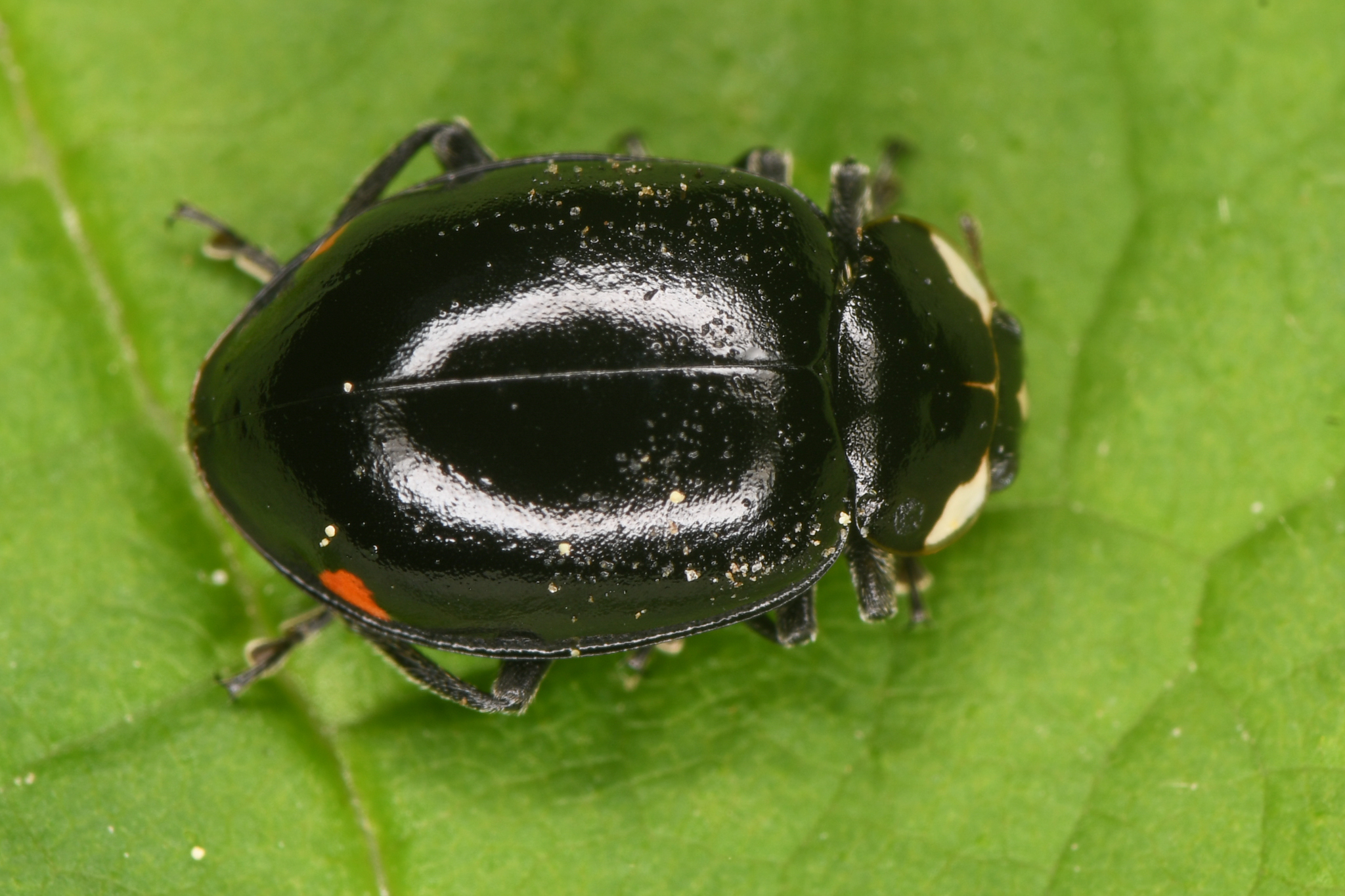

Scientific classification
- Kingdom: Animalia
- Phylum: Arthropoda
- Clade: Pancrustacea
- Class: Insecta
- Order: Coleoptera
- Suborder: Polyphaga
- Infraorder: Cucujiformia
- Family: Coccinellidae
- Genus: Hippodamia
- Species: H. moesta

Binomial name
- Hippodamia moesta LeConte, 1854

Synonyms
- Hippodamia bowditchi Johnson, 1910; Hippodamia politissima Casey, 1899

= Hippodamia moesta =

Species of beetle

Hippodamia moesta, the sorrowful lady beetle, is a species of lady beetle in the family Coccinellidae. It is found in North America, where it has been recorded from British Columbia, California, Washington, Oregon, Colorado, Idaho and Montana.

== Description ==
Adults reach a length of about 6-7.5 mm. The pronotum sometimes has pale spots and the elytron is normally black with a pale spot on the margin.

== Subspecies ==
These three subspecies belong to the species Hippodamia moesta:

- Hippodamia moesta bowditchi Johnson, 1910 (British Columbia, California, Colorado, Idaho, Montana)
- Hippodamia moesta moesta LeConte, 1854 (British Columbia, California, Oregon, Washington)
- Hippodamia moesta politissima Casey, 1899 (California)
