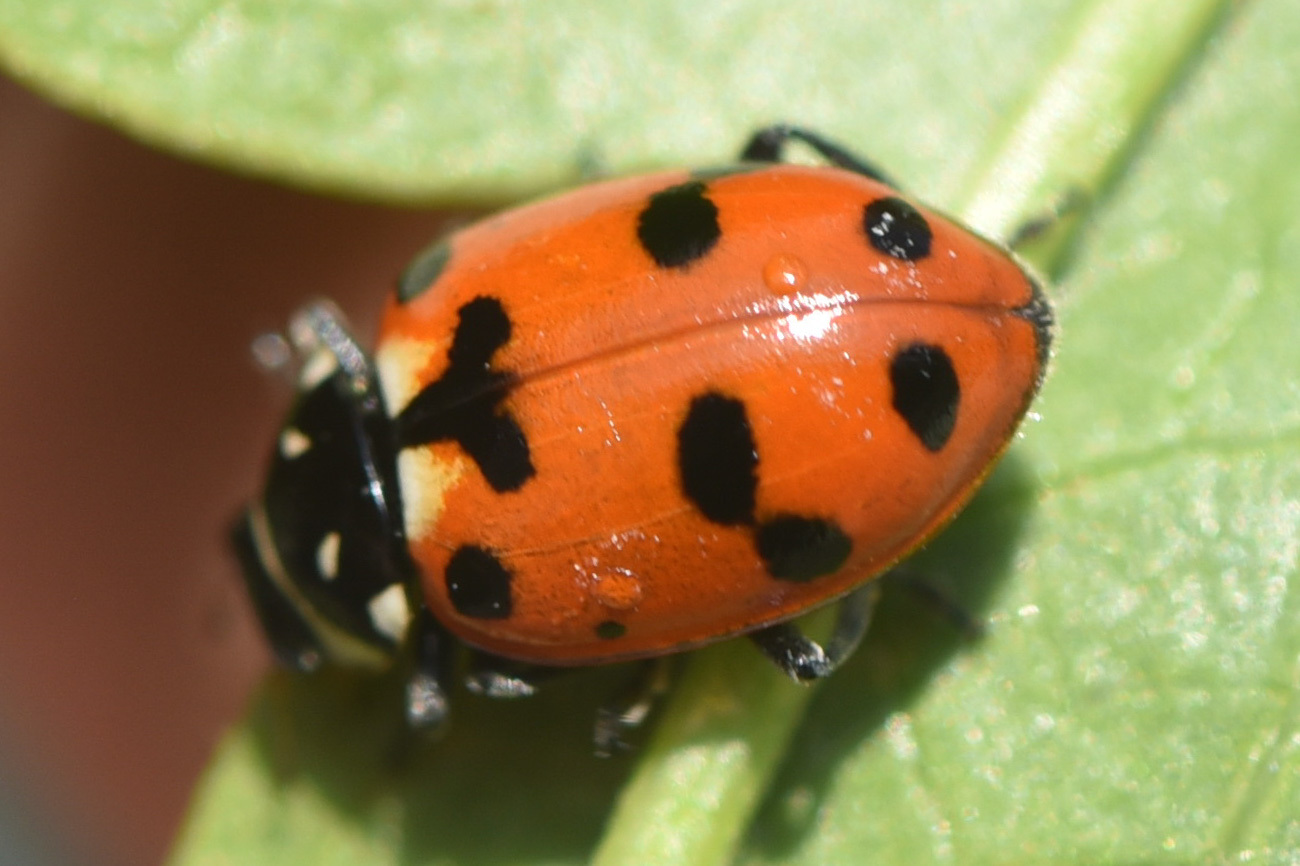

Scientific classification
- Kingdom: Animalia
- Phylum: Arthropoda
- Clade: Pancrustacea
- Class: Insecta
- Order: Coleoptera
- Suborder: Polyphaga
- Infraorder: Cucujiformia
- Family: Coccinellidae
- Genus: Hippodamia
- Species: H. caseyi

Binomial name
- Hippodamia caseyi Johnson, 1910

Synonyms
- Hippodamia convergens var. caseyi Johnson, 1910

= Hippodamia caseyi =

Species of beetle

Hippodamia caseyi, or Casey's lady beetle, is a species of lady beetle in the family Coccinellidae. It is found in North America, where it has been recorded from British Columbia, California, Colorado, Idaho, Montana, Oregon, Utah and Washington.

== Description ==
Adults reach a length of about 4.80-6.70 mm. The pronotum sometimes has pale spots.
