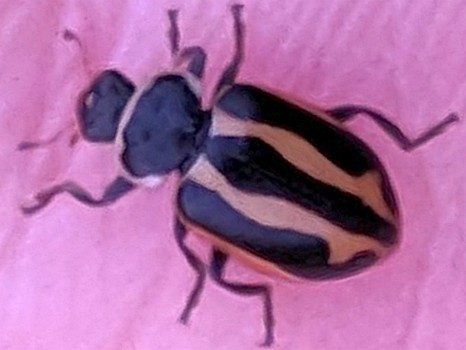

Scientific classification
- Kingdom: Animalia
- Phylum: Arthropoda
- Clade: Pancrustacea
- Class: Insecta
- Order: Coleoptera
- Suborder: Polyphaga
- Infraorder: Cucujiformia
- Family: Coccinellidae
- Genus: Hippodamia
- Species: H. falcigera

Binomial name
- Hippodamia falcigera Crotch, 1873

Synonyms
- Hippodamia sinuata albertana Casey, 1924; Ceratomegilla cottlei Nunenmacher, 1934

= Hippodamia falcigera =

Species of beetle

Hippodamia falcigera, the sickle-marked lady beetle, is a species of lady beetle in the family Coccinellidae. It is found in North America, where it has been recorded from Alberta, British Columbia, the Northwest Territories, Yukon, Idaho and Wyoming.

== Description ==
Adults reach a length of about 5-6 mm.
