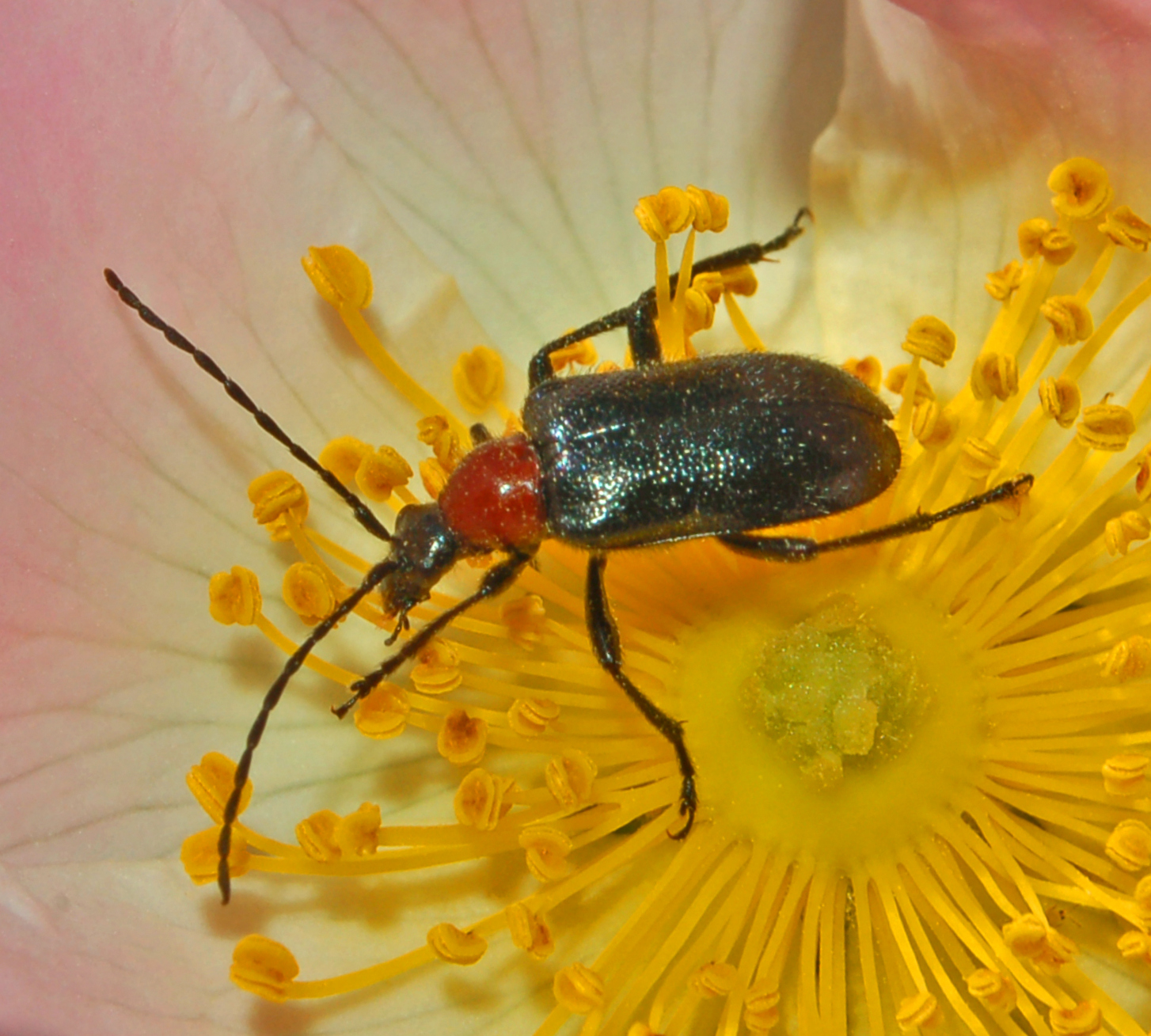
- Dinoptera collaris

Scientific classification
- Domain: Eukaryota
- Kingdom: Animalia
- Phylum: Arthropoda
- Class: Insecta
- Order: Coleoptera
- Suborder: Polyphaga
- Infraorder: Cucujiformia
- Family: Cerambycidae
- Subfamily: Lepturinae
- Genus: Dinoptera; Mulsant, 1863

= Dinoptera =

Genus of beetles

Dinoptera is a genus of the Lepturinae subfamily in long-horned beetle family.

== Species ==
Species within this genus include:

- Dinoptera anthracina (Mannerheim, 1849)
- Dinoptera chrysomelina Holzschuh, 2003
- Dinoptera collaris (Linnaeus, 1758)
- Dinoptera concolor Ganglbauer, 1888
- Dinoptera daghestanica (Pic, 1897)
- Dinoptera lota Holzschuh, 1998
- Dinoptera minuta (Gebler, 1832)
