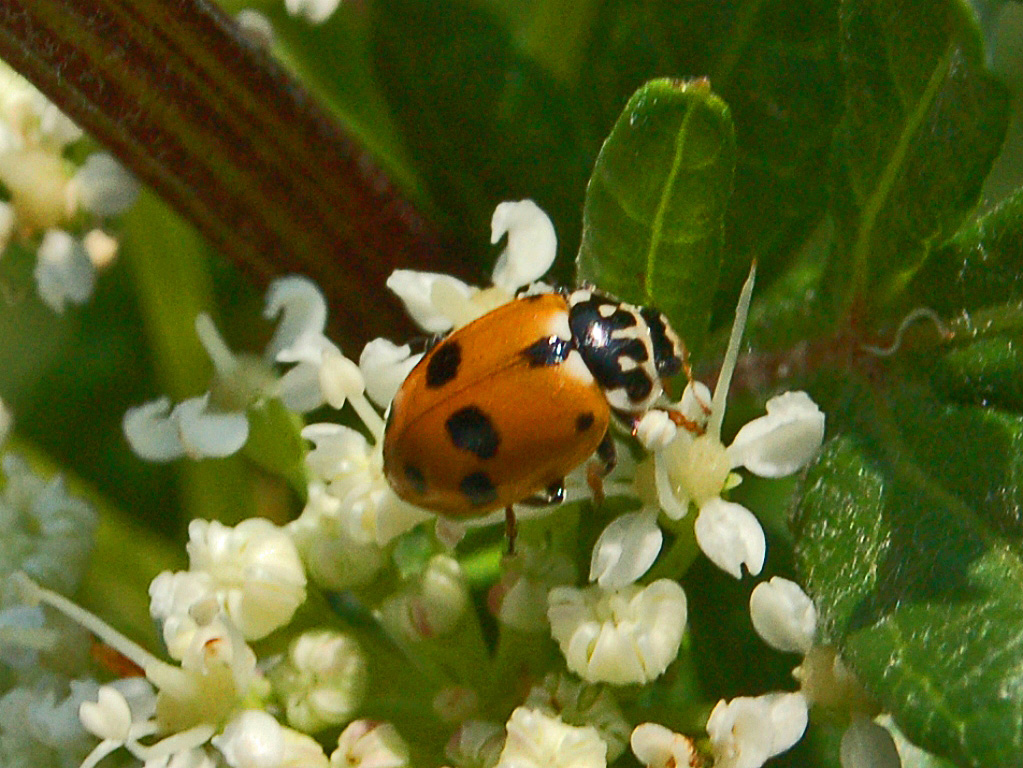
- Hippodamia variegata var. novempunctata

Scientific classification
- Kingdom: Animalia
- Phylum: Arthropoda
- Clade: Pancrustacea
- Class: Insecta
- Order: Coleoptera
- Suborder: Polyphaga
- Infraorder: Cucujiformia
- Family: Coccinellidae
- Genus: Hippodamia
- Species: H. variegata

Binomial name
- Hippodamia variegata (Goeze, 1777)

Synonyms
- Adonia variegata (Goeze); Coccinella variegata Goeze, 1777; Coccinella quadripunctata Müller, 1776 (preocc.); Coccinella constellata Laicharting, 1781; Coccinella limbata Fabricius, 1781; Coccinella obversepunctata Schrank, 1781; Coccinella undecimpunctata Schrank, 1781 (preocc.); Coccinella similis Schrank, 1781; Coccinella quinquemaculata Fabricius, 1787; Coccinella mutabilis Scriba, 1790 (preocc.); Coccinella carpini Geoffroy, 1785; Coccinella immaculata Gmelin, 1790; Coccinella affinis Olivier, 1791; Coccinella septemnotata Fabricius, 1792; Coccinella fennica Thunberg, 1795; Coccinella laeta Fabricius, 1798; Adonia doubledayi Mulsant, 1850; Adonia corsica Reiche, 1862; Hippodamia ripicola Mulsant, 1866; Adonia bifurcata Mulsant, 1866; Adonia kriechbaumii Mulsant, 1866; Coccinella tredecimpunctata Geoffroy, 1785 (preocc.); Coccinella turkmenica Zoubkoff, 1833

= Hippodamia variegata =

Species of beetle

Hippodamia variegata, the Adonis ladybird, also known as the variegated ladybug (US) and spotted amber ladybeetle (Aus), is a species of ladybeetle belonging to the family Coccinellidae, subfamily Coccinellinae.

== Habitat and distribution ==
This species is native in the Palearctic, but has also spread to the Nearctic and Oriental region. It has been found outside its native range countries such as Australia, South Africa, Kenya, India, China, Canada, the United States, and Chile, often through intended introduction to control crop pests.

This species mainly inhabits fields, meadows, gardens and shrubs, more than bushes and trees. It prefers dry, rough vegetation.

== Identification ==
Hippodamia variegata grow up to 3–5.5 millimetres (0.12–0.22 in). These beetles have a slightly convex and rather elongated body. The first segment of the anterior legs of males is greatly expanded. Head is black, with dark eyes and white spots. Pronotum is black, with a white-yellowish border and a central black mask shaped marking. Elytra are red or orange, with a very variable number of black points (from zero up to thirteen). One black spot surrounded by white is located on the scutellum. The legs are blackish brown, with brown ends. The underside of the body is black.

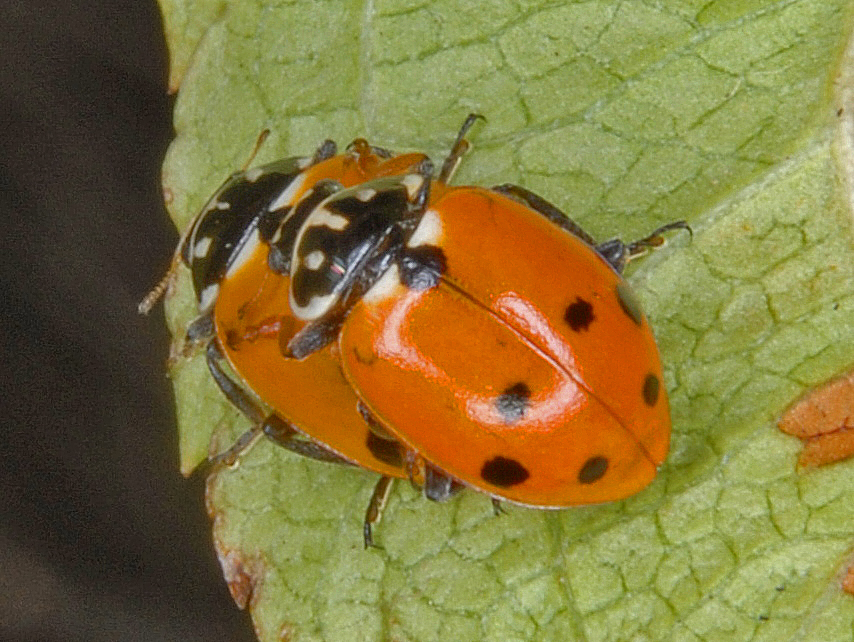
Adults

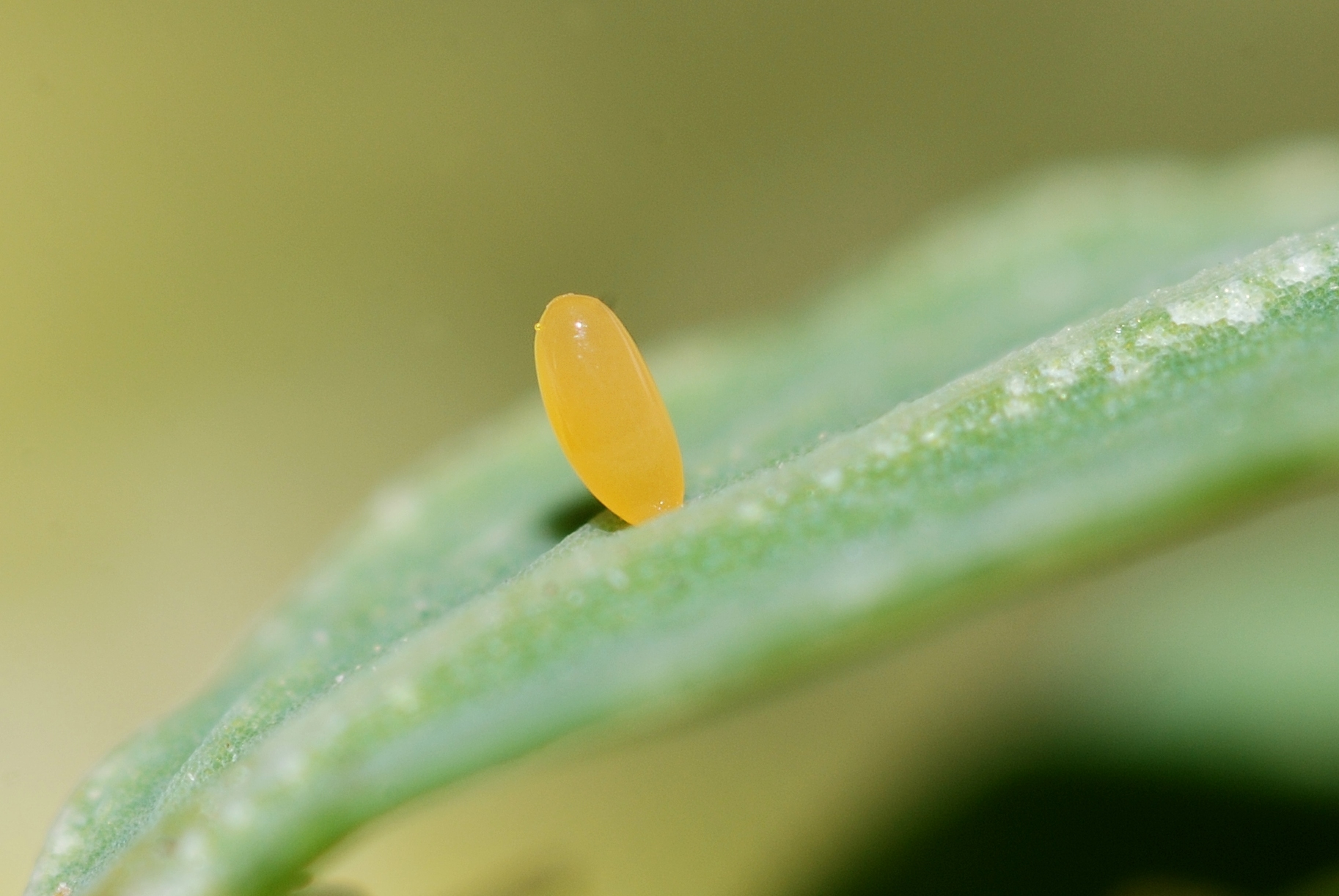
Egg

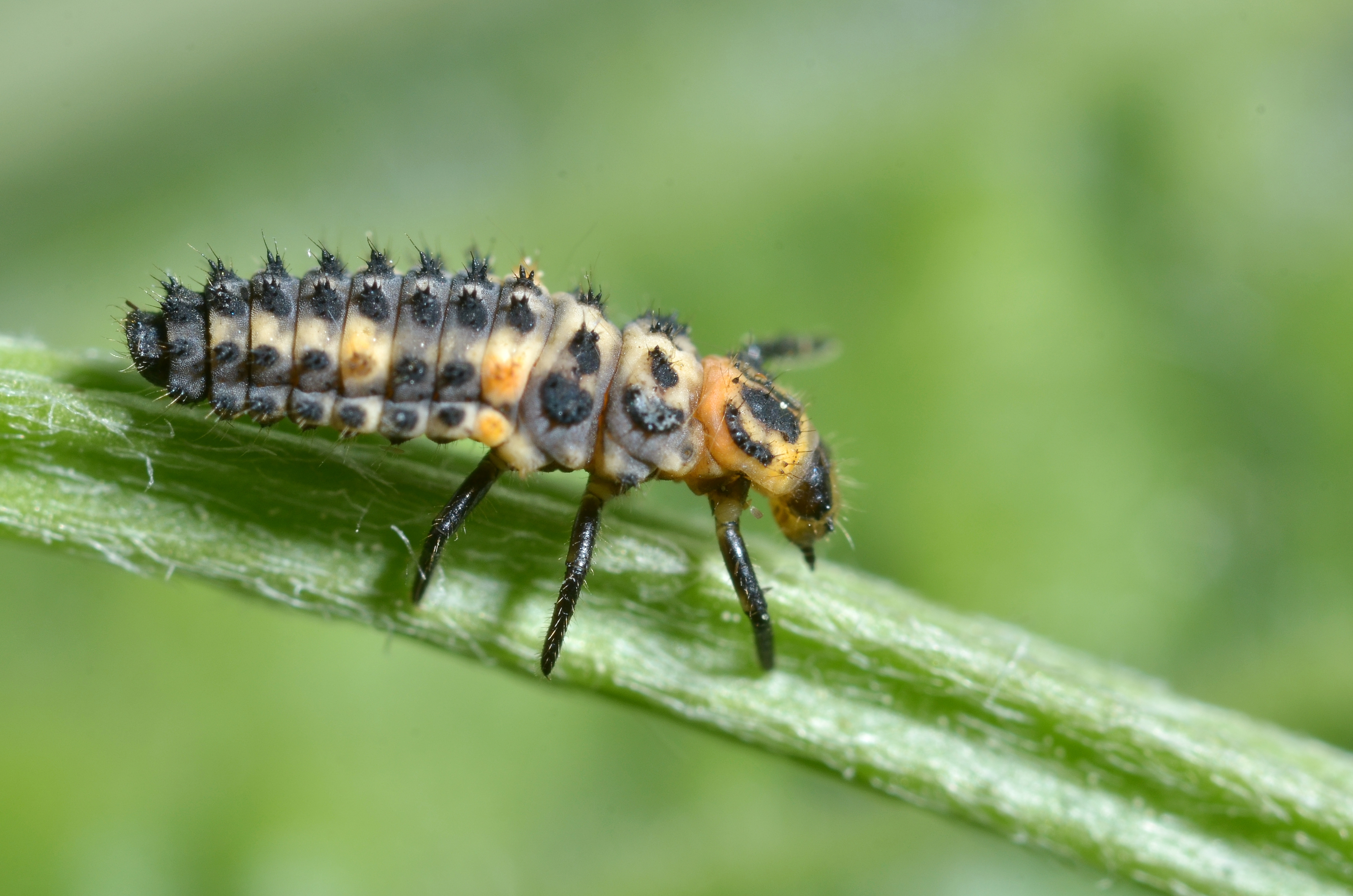
Larva

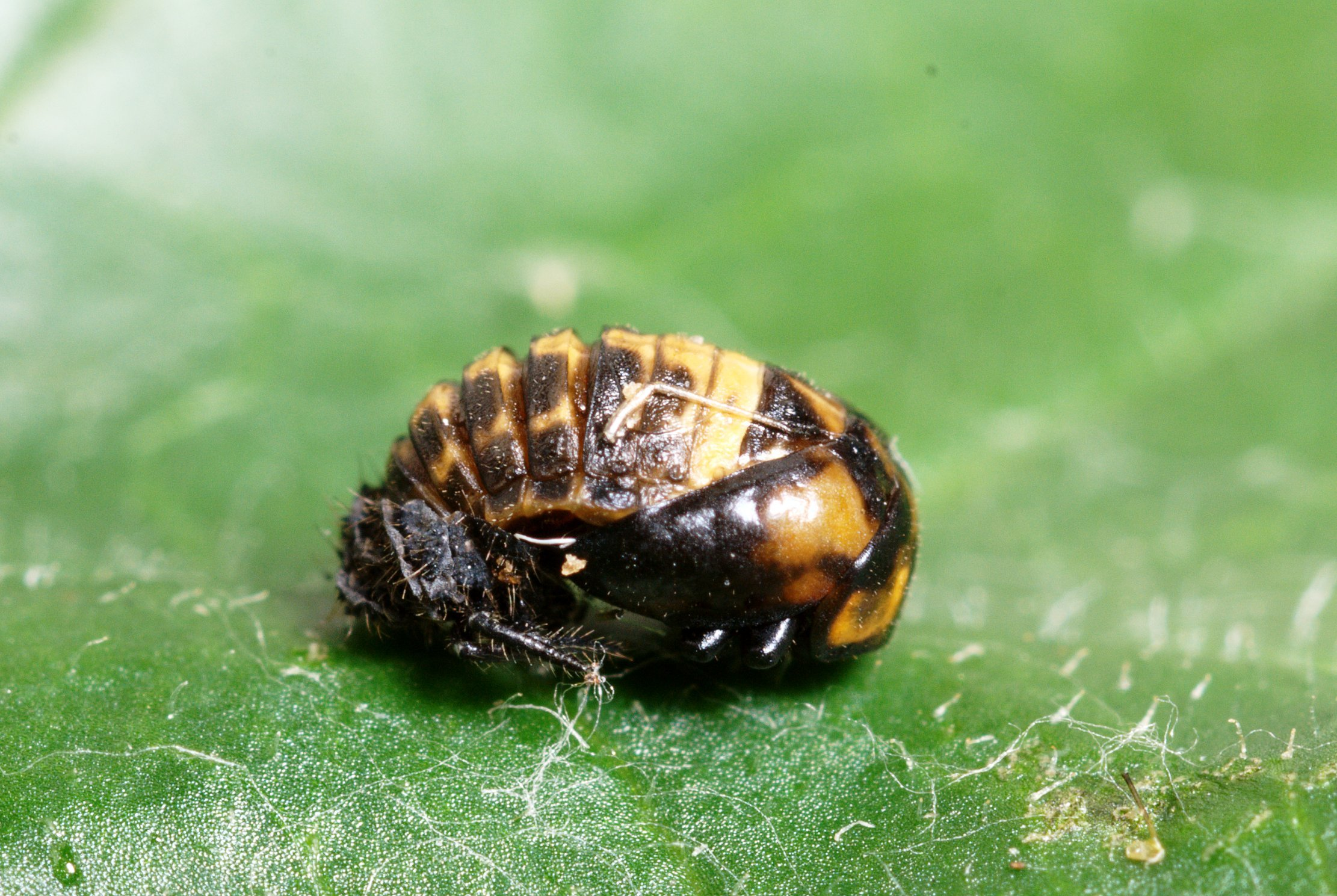
Pupa

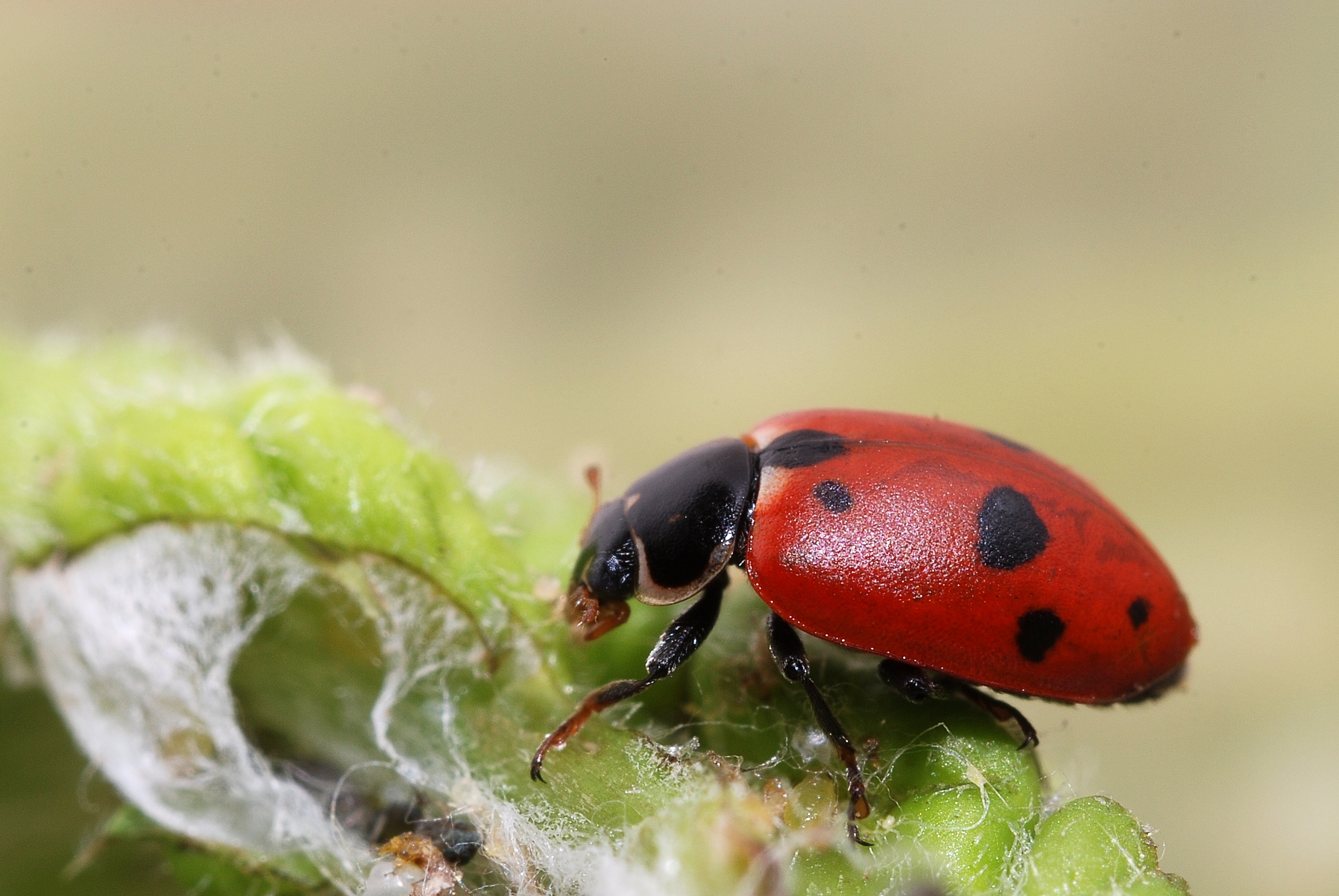
Imago
