= Hippodamia apicalis =

Scientific classification
- Kingdom: Animalia
- Phylum: Arthropoda
- Clade: Pancrustacea
- Class: Insecta
- Order: Coleoptera
- Suborder: Polyphaga
- Infraorder: Cucujiformia
- Family: Coccinellidae
- Genus: Hippodamia
- Species: H. apicalis

Binomial name
- Hippodamia apicalis Casey, 1899

Synonyms
- Hippodamia lengi Johnson, 1910; Adalia nigromaculata Nunenmacher, 1934; Hippodamia apicalis tricolor Nunenmacher, 1946

Species of beetle

Hippodamia apicalis with left elytron removed to show wings

Hippodamia apicalis is a species of lady beetle in the family Coccinellidae. It is found in North America, where it has been recorded from Montana to New Mexico, west to southern British Columbia and southern California.

== Description ==
Adults reach a length of about 3.50–4.70 mm. The colour pattern of the elytron is variable, but the suture is always black.
