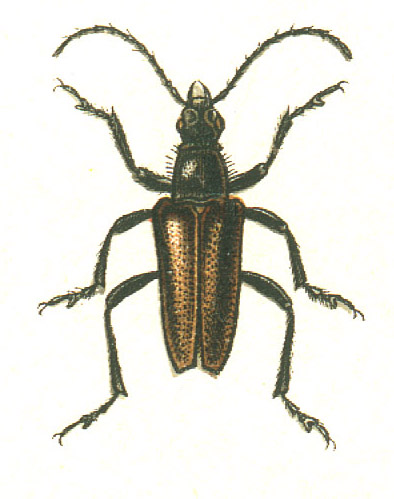

Scientific classification
- Kingdom: Animalia
- Phylum: Arthropoda
- Clade: Pancrustacea
- Class: Insecta
- Order: Coleoptera
- Suborder: Polyphaga
- Infraorder: Cucujiformia
- Family: Cerambycidae
- Genus: Gnathacmaeops
- Species: G. pratensis

Binomial name
- Gnathacmaeops pratensis (Laicharting, 1784)

Synonyms
- Acmaeops longiceps (Kirby) LeConte, 1850; Acmaeops strigilata (Fabricius) LeConte in Agassiz, 1850; Acmaeops strigilatus (Fabricius) LeConte, 1850; Gnathacmaeops pratensis (Laicharting) Linsley & Chemsak, 1972; Leptura lateralis Estlund, 1796; Leptura longiceps Kirby, 1837; Leptura pratensis Laicharting, 1784; Leptura semi-marginata Randall, 1838; Leptura semimarginata (Randall) Melsheimer, 1853; Leptura strigilata Fabricius, 1792

= Gnathacmaeops pratensis =

Species of beetle

Gnathacmaeops pratensis is a species of the Lepturinae subfamily in the long-horned beetle family. This beetle is distributed in Austria, Belarus, Bosnia and Herzegovina, Bulgaria, Canada, Croatia, Czech Republic, Estonia, Finland, France, Germany, Hungary, China, Italy, Kazakhstan, Latvia, Lithuania, Moldova, Mongolia, Montenegro, North Macedonia, Norway, Poland, Romania, Russia, Serbia, Slovakia, Slovenia, Spain, Sweden, Switzerland, Ukraine, and the United States. The adult beetle feeds on Norway spruce.

== Subtaxa ==
There can be two additional varieties in the species:

- Gnathacmaeops pratensis var. obscuripennis Pic, 1901
- Gnathacmaeops pratensis var. suturalis (Mulsant, 1863)
