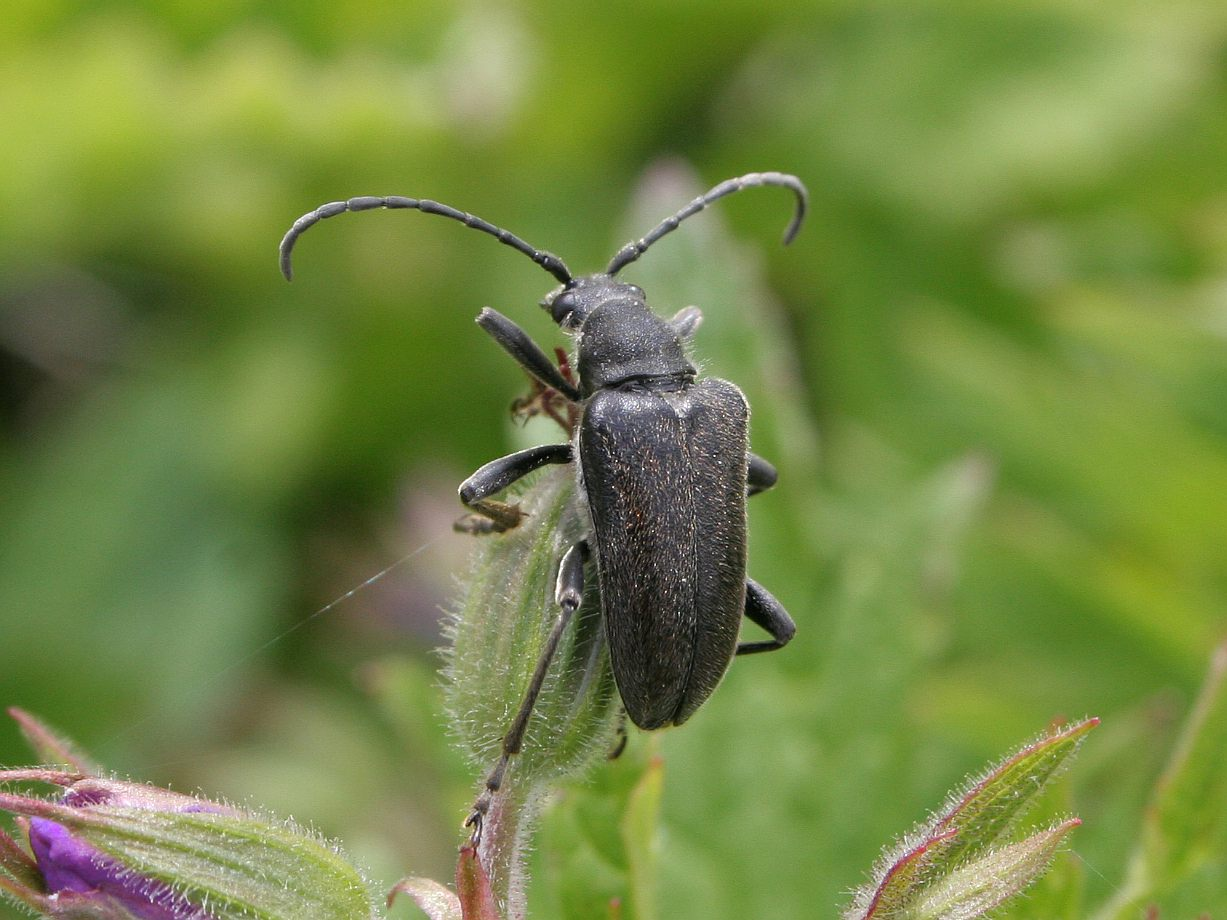

Scientific classification
- Kingdom: Animalia
- Phylum: Arthropoda
- Clade: Pancrustacea
- Class: Insecta
- Order: Coleoptera
- Suborder: Polyphaga
- Infraorder: Cucujiformia
- Family: Cerambycidae
- Genus: Acmaeops
- Species: A. septentrionis

Binomial name
- Acmaeops septentrionis (C.G. Thomson, 1866)

Synonyms
- Pachyta septentrionis C.G. Thomson, 1866; Stictoleptura scutellata

= Acmaeops septentrionis =

Species of beetle

Acmaeops septentrionis is a species of the Lepturinae subfamily in the long-horned beetle family. This beetle is distributed in Austria, Belarus, Bulgaria, Czech Republic, Estonia, Finland, France, Germany, China, Italy, Japan, Latvia, Lithuania, Mongolia, North Korea, Norway, Poland, South Korea, Romania, Russia, Slovakia, Slovenia, Sweden, Switzerland, and Ukraine. Adult beetle feeds on Norway spruce.

== Subtaxa ==
There are two varieties in Acmaeops septentrionis species:

- Acmaeops septentrionis var. alpestris Pic, 1898
- Acmaeops septentrionis var. simplonica (Stierlin, 1880)
