= Gnathacmaeops brachypterus =

Scientific classification
- Domain: Eukaryota
- Kingdom: Animalia
- Phylum: Arthropoda
- Class: Insecta
- Order: Coleoptera
- Suborder: Polyphaga
- Infraorder: Cucujiformia
- Family: Cerambycidae
- Genus: Gnathacmaeops
- Species: G. brachypterus

Binomial name
- Gnathacmaeops brachypterus (K. Daniel & J. Daniel, 1899)

Synonyms
- Acmaeops brachyptera K. Daniel & J. Daniel, 1899

Species of beetle

Gnathacmaeops brachypterus is a species of long-horned beetle in the subfamily Lepturinae. This beetle is distributed in China, and Kazakhstan.
