= Johann Nepomuk von Laicharting =

Austrian Entomologist born 1754

Johann Nepomuk von Laicharting was an Austrian entomologist. He was born in Innsbruck on 4 February 1754 and died in the same city on 7 May 1797, and was a Professor of Natural Science (Naturgeschichte) in Innsbruck. He described new species and genera of Coleoptera in Verzeichniss und Beschreibung der Tyroler-Insecten. 1. Teil. Kaferartige Insecten. 1. Band. 1781: I-XII, 1-248. - Zurich, bey Johann Casper Fuessly 1781. In English, lists and descriptions of Tyrol insects - beetles. Presumably this was intended to cover all Austrian insects but no further parts were published.

== Sources ==
- Gaedicke in Groll, E. K. (Hrsg.): Biografien der Entomologen der Welt : Datenbank. Version 4.15 : Senckenberg Deutsches Entomologisches Institut, 2010.
- Index Novus Litteraturae Entomologicae Completely revised new edition of the Index Litteraturae Entomologicae Bibliography of the literature on entomology from the beginning until 1863
