= Nesina =

Nesina may refer to:

- a brand name for Alogliptin, an orally administered anti-diabetic drug
- Nesina (beetle), a ladybird genus in the tribe Sticholotidini
