= Glomerella =

Glomerella may refer to:

- Glomerella (fungus), a synonym for Colletotrichum, a fungal genus
- Glomerella (beetle), a ladybird genus in the tribe Sticholotidini
