= Jauravia opaca =

Scientific classification
- Kingdom: Animalia
- Phylum: Arthropoda
- Clade: Pancrustacea
- Class: Insecta
- Order: Coleoptera
- Suborder: Polyphaga
- Infraorder: Cucujiformia
- Family: Coccinellidae
- Subfamily: Coccinellinae
- Tribe: Sticholotidini
- Genus: Jauravia
- Species: J. opaca

Binomial name
- Jauravia opaca (Weise, 1900)

Synonyms
- Clanis opaca Weise, 1900

Species of beetle

Jauravia opaca, is a species of lady beetle native to India, and Sri Lanka.
