= Jauravia pubescens =

Scientific classification
- Kingdom: Animalia
- Phylum: Arthropoda
- Clade: Pancrustacea
- Class: Insecta
- Order: Coleoptera
- Suborder: Polyphaga
- Infraorder: Cucujiformia
- Family: Coccinellidae
- Subfamily: Coccinellinae
- Tribe: Sticholotidini
- Genus: Jauravia
- Species: J. pubescens

Binomial name
- Jauravia pubescens (Fabricius, 1798)

Synonyms
- Coccinellu pubescens Fabricius, 1798; Clanis pubescens (Fabr.) Mulsant, 1850

Species of beetle

Jauravia pubescens, is a species of lady beetle native to India, and Sri Lanka.

== Description ==
Body length is about 2.5 mm.

It is a predator of Megapulvinaria maxima, Cydia leucostoma and Opisina arenosella.
