= Sticholotis klapperichi =

Scientific classification
- Kingdom: Animalia
- Phylum: Arthropoda
- Clade: Pancrustacea
- Class: Insecta
- Order: Coleoptera
- Suborder: Polyphaga
- Infraorder: Cucujiformia
- Family: Coccinellidae
- Genus: Sticholotis
- Species: S. klapperichi

Binomial name
- Sticholotis klapperichi Mader, 1955

Species of beetle

Sticholotis klapperichi is a species of beetle of the family Coccinellidae. It is found in China (Fujian).

== Description ==
Adults are similar to Sticholotis nanlingensis, but may be distinguished by the reddish lateral margins of the pronotum and the elytral punctures which are larger than the pronotal ones.
