= Sticholotis morimotoi =

Scientific classification
- Kingdom: Animalia
- Phylum: Arthropoda
- Clade: Pancrustacea
- Class: Insecta
- Order: Coleoptera
- Suborder: Polyphaga
- Infraorder: Cucujiformia
- Family: Coccinellidae
- Genus: Sticholotis
- Species: S. morimotoi

Binomial name
- Sticholotis morimotoi Kamiya, 1965

Species of beetle

Sticholotis morimotoi is a species of beetle of the family Coccinellidae. It is found in Taiwan and Japan (Ryukyu Islands).

== Description ==
Adults are similar to Sticholotis formosana, but can be distinguished by the relatively small body size, black pronotum and nearly rounded anterior elytral spots.
