= Sticholotis confucii =

Scientific classification
- Kingdom: Animalia
- Phylum: Arthropoda
- Clade: Pancrustacea
- Class: Insecta
- Order: Coleoptera
- Suborder: Polyphaga
- Infraorder: Cucujiformia
- Family: Coccinellidae
- Genus: Sticholotis
- Species: S. confucii

Binomial name
- Sticholotis confucii (Mulsant, 1850)

Synonyms
- Lotis confucii Mulsant, 1850

Species of beetle

Sticholotis confucii is a species of beetle of the family Coccinellidae. It is found in China (Guangdong).

== Description ==
They are similar to Sticholotis formosana, but can be distinguished by the three longitudinal rows of large punctures on each elytron.
