= Jauravia soror =

Scientific classification
- Kingdom: Animalia
- Phylum: Arthropoda
- Clade: Pancrustacea
- Class: Insecta
- Order: Coleoptera
- Suborder: Polyphaga
- Infraorder: Cucujiformia
- Family: Coccinellidae
- Subfamily: Coccinellinae
- Tribe: Sticholotidini
- Genus: Jauravia
- Species: J. soror

Binomial name
- Jauravia soror (Weise, 1892)

Synonyms
- Clanis soror Weise, 1892

Species of beetle

Jauravia soror, is a species of lady beetle native to India, and Sri Lanka.

== Description ==
Body length is about 2.5 to 2.8 mm. The upper surface is reddish brown to reddish testaceous, except for the lighter external borders of the elytra which are shining. The underside is brown.

It is a predator of Hemaspidoproctus cinereus, Tetranychus bioculatus, Raoiella indica, Trialeurodes ricini and Dialeurodes citri.
