= Jauravia limbata =

Scientific classification
- Kingdom: Animalia
- Phylum: Arthropoda
- Clade: Pancrustacea
- Class: Insecta
- Order: Coleoptera
- Suborder: Polyphaga
- Infraorder: Cucujiformia
- Family: Coccinellidae
- Subfamily: Coccinellinae
- Tribe: Sticholotidini
- Genus: Jauravia
- Species: J. limbata

Binomial name
- Jauravia limbata Motschulsky, 1858

Synonyms
- Paraclitostethus ovatus Ohta, 1929

Species of beetle

Jauravia limbata, is a species of lady beetle native to India, Sri Lanka, Nepal and Bhutan.

== Description ==
It is very similar to Synonychimorpha chittagongi. The body is moderate in size. Body length is 2.3 to 2.5 mm.
