= Parinesa gnoma =

Scientific classification
- Kingdom: Animalia
- Phylum: Arthropoda
- Clade: Pancrustacea
- Class: Insecta
- Order: Coleoptera
- Suborder: Polyphaga
- Infraorder: Cucujiformia
- Family: Coccinellidae
- Genus: Parinesa
- Species: P. gnoma

Binomial name
- Parinesa gnoma (Gordon, 1977)

Synonyms
- Glomerella gnoma Gordon, 1977

Species of beetle

Parinesa gnoma is a species of beetle of the family Coccinellidae. It is found in Colombia.

== Description ==
Adults reach a length of about 1.16 mm. Adults are similar to Glomerella perconvexa.

== Etymology ==
The species name is a Neolatin noun referring to the small size.
