= Jauravia pilosula =

Scientific classification
- Kingdom: Animalia
- Phylum: Arthropoda
- Clade: Pancrustacea
- Class: Insecta
- Order: Coleoptera
- Suborder: Polyphaga
- Infraorder: Cucujiformia
- Family: Coccinellidae
- Subfamily: Coccinellinae
- Tribe: Sticholotidini
- Genus: Jauravia
- Species: J. pilosula

Binomial name
- Jauravia pilosula (Weise, 1900)

Synonyms
- Clanis pilosula Weise, 1900; Jauravia pilosula (Weise) Korschefsky, 1931

Species of beetle

Jauravia pilosula, is a species of lady beetle native to India, and Sri Lanka.

== Description ==
Body length is about 2.30 to 5 mm. They are light to deep testaceous.
