= Jauravia simplex =

Scientific classification
- Kingdom: Animalia
- Phylum: Arthropoda
- Clade: Pancrustacea
- Class: Insecta
- Order: Coleoptera
- Suborder: Polyphaga
- Infraorder: Cucujiformia
- Family: Coccinellidae
- Subfamily: Coccinellinae
- Tribe: Sticholotidini
- Genus: Jauravia
- Species: J. simplex

Binomial name
- Jauravia simplex (Walker, 1859)

Synonyms
- Coccinella simplex Walker, 1859; Scymnus simplex (Walker) Gemminger and Harold, 1876; Clanis simplex (Walker) Sicard, 1912; Jauravia simplex (Walker) Korschefsky, 1932; Clanis opaca Weise, 1900; Jauravia opaca (Weise) Korschefsky, 1931

Species of beetle

Jauravia simplex, is a species of lady beetle native to India, and Sri Lanka.

== Description ==
Body length is about 2.2 to 2.5 mm.

It is a predator of Cecidomyiid larvae that attack coffee.
