= Jauravia albidula =

Scientific classification
- Kingdom: Animalia
- Phylum: Arthropoda
- Clade: Pancrustacea
- Class: Insecta
- Order: Coleoptera
- Suborder: Polyphaga
- Infraorder: Cucujiformia
- Family: Coccinellidae
- Subfamily: Coccinellinae
- Tribe: Sticholotidini
- Genus: Jauravia
- Species: J. albidula

Binomial name
- Jauravia albidula (Motschulsky, 1866)

Synonyms
- Glanis pubescsns Weise, 1892

Species of beetle

Jauravia albidula, is a species of lady beetle endemic to Sri Lanka.

== Description ==
Body length is about 2.8 to 3.0 mm. They are very light yellowish brown except for the black eyes, and the dark brown external margins of the elytra.
