= Boschalis bremeri =

Scientific classification
- Kingdom: Animalia
- Phylum: Arthropoda
- Clade: Pancrustacea
- Class: Insecta
- Order: Coleoptera
- Suborder: Polyphaga
- Infraorder: Cucujiformia
- Family: Coccinellidae
- Genus: Boschalis
- Species: B. bremeri

Binomial name
- Boschalis bremeri Fürsch, 1995

Species of beetle

Boschalis bremeri is a species of beetle of the family Coccinellidae. It is found in Tanzania.

== Description ==
Adults reach a length of about 2.8–2.9 mm (0.11–0.11 in). The head is black with white pubescence. The pronotum is black with white pubescence and the elytra are red with a black outer margin. The underside is dark brownish-red.

== Etymology ==
The species is named after its discoverer, Professor H. J. Bremer.
