= Boschalis karisimbica =

Scientific classification
- Kingdom: Animalia
- Phylum: Arthropoda
- Clade: Pancrustacea
- Class: Insecta
- Order: Coleoptera
- Suborder: Polyphaga
- Infraorder: Cucujiformia
- Family: Coccinellidae
- Genus: Boschalis
- Species: B. karisimbica

Binomial name
- Boschalis karisimbica Weise, 1913

Species of beetle

Boschalis karisimbica is a species of beetle of the family Coccinellidae. It is found in Rwanda and Uganda.

== Description ==
Adults reach a length of about 3 mm (0.12 in). The head is dark brown. The pronotum is also dark brown, but slightly paler at the base. Both the head and pronotum have long, fine white pubescence. The elytra are red, with a black-brown lateral margin. The underside is red, but the legs are black.
