= Sticholotis acutifolia =

Scientific classification
- Kingdom: Animalia
- Phylum: Arthropoda
- Clade: Pancrustacea
- Class: Insecta
- Order: Coleoptera
- Suborder: Polyphaga
- Infraorder: Cucujiformia
- Family: Coccinellidae
- Genus: Sticholotis
- Species: S. acutifolia

Binomial name
- Sticholotis acutifolia Wang & Ren, 2017

Species of beetle

Sticholotis acutifolia is a species of beetle of the family Coccinellidae. It is found in China (Guangxi).

== Description ==
Adults reach a length of about 2.14 mm (0.084 in). They have a shiny and glabrous body, but the head is densely covered with short setae. The head is brown and the pronotum and scutellum are black. The elytra are orange, with a brown band along the lateral margin and suture, and with three black spots. The underside is brown and the legs are yellowish brown.

== Etymology ==
The species name is derived from Latin acutifolius and refers to the pointed apex of the penis.
