= Semiviride loisobrienae =

Scientific classification
- Kingdom: Animalia
- Phylum: Arthropoda
- Clade: Pancrustacea
- Class: Insecta
- Order: Coleoptera
- Suborder: Polyphaga
- Infraorder: Cucujiformia
- Family: Coccinellidae
- Genus: Semiviride
- Species: S. loisobrienae

Binomial name
- Semiviride loisobrienae Gordon, 1991

Species of beetle

Semiviride loisobrienae is a species of beetle of the family Coccinellidae. It is found in Puerto Rico.

== Description ==
Adults reach a length of about 1.7–1.8 mm. Adults are black with a metallic green sheen.

== Etymology ==
The species is named for Lois O'Brien, collector of the allotype.
