= Sticholotis vietnamica =

Scientific classification
- Kingdom: Animalia
- Phylum: Arthropoda
- Clade: Pancrustacea
- Class: Insecta
- Order: Coleoptera
- Suborder: Polyphaga
- Infraorder: Cucujiformia
- Family: Coccinellidae
- Genus: Sticholotis
- Species: S. vietnamica

Binomial name
- Sticholotis vietnamica Hoang, 1982

Species of beetle

Sticholotis vietnamica is a species of beetle of the family Coccinellidae. It is found in China (Yunnan) and Vietnam.

== Description ==
Adults reach a length of about 2.31 mm (0.091 in). They have a shiny and glabrous body, but with some setae on the head. The head is reddish brown with yellowish brown mouthparts. The dorsal surface is red, while the ventral surface is reddish brown.
