= Jauravia dorsalis =

Scientific classification
- Kingdom: Animalia
- Phylum: Arthropoda
- Clade: Pancrustacea
- Class: Insecta
- Order: Coleoptera
- Suborder: Polyphaga
- Infraorder: Cucujiformia
- Family: Coccinellidae
- Genus: Jauravia
- Species: J. dorsalis

Binomial name
- Jauravia dorsalis (Weise, 1908)

Synonyms
- Clanis dorsalis Weise, 1908

Species of beetle

Jauravia dorsalis is a species of beetle of the family Coccinellidae. It is found in India (Pondicherry, Tamil Nadu, Andhra Pradesh, Nilgiri Hills).

== Description ==
Adults reach a length of about 2.7–3 mm (0.11–0.12 in). The head and appendages are testaceous, except for the dark grey eyes. The pronotum and elytra are reddish brown, the latter each with the discal area fuscous. The underside is lighter.
