= Sticholotis magnopunctata =

Scientific classification
- Kingdom: Animalia
- Phylum: Arthropoda
- Clade: Pancrustacea
- Class: Insecta
- Order: Coleoptera
- Suborder: Polyphaga
- Infraorder: Cucujiformia
- Family: Coccinellidae
- Genus: Sticholotis
- Species: S. magnopunctata

Binomial name
- Sticholotis magnopunctata Wang & Ren, 2017

Species of beetle

Sticholotis magnopunctata is a species of beetle of the family Coccinellidae. It is found in China (Sichuan, Yunnan).

== Description ==
Adults reach a length of about 2.14–2.21 mm (0.084–0.087 in). They have a shiny and glabrous body, but the head is densely covered with short setae. The head is dark brown, with brown mouthparts. The pronotum and scutellum are black and the elytra are dark red, with a black band along the lateral margin and suture, and each elytron with three black spots. The underside is dark brown.

== Etymology ==
The species name is derived from Latin magnus and punctatus and refers to a large black spot on each elytron.
