= Sticholotis brachyloba =

Scientific classification
- Kingdom: Animalia
- Phylum: Arthropoda
- Clade: Pancrustacea
- Class: Insecta
- Order: Coleoptera
- Suborder: Polyphaga
- Infraorder: Cucujiformia
- Family: Coccinellidae
- Genus: Sticholotis
- Species: S. brachyloba

Binomial name
- Sticholotis brachyloba Wang & Ren, 2017

Species of beetle

Sticholotis brachyloba is a species of beetle of the family Coccinellidae. It is found in China (Yunnan).

== Description ==
Adults reach a length of about 2.27–2.54 mm (0.089–0.100 in). They have a shiny and glabrous body, but the head has some short setae. The head and pronotum are reddish brown and the scutellum is dark brown. The elytra are reddish brown, with a black band along the lateral margins, and each elytron with four black spots. The underside and legs are reddish brown.

== Etymology ==
The species name is derived from Latin brachy and lobe and refers to the very short parameres.
