= Sticholotis denticulata =

Scientific classification
- Kingdom: Animalia
- Phylum: Arthropoda
- Clade: Pancrustacea
- Class: Insecta
- Order: Coleoptera
- Suborder: Polyphaga
- Infraorder: Cucujiformia
- Family: Coccinellidae
- Genus: Sticholotis
- Species: S. denticulata

Binomial name
- Sticholotis denticulata Hoang, 1982

Species of beetle

Sticholotis denticulata is a species of beetle of the family Coccinellidae. It is found in China (Guangxi) and Vietnam.

== Description ==
Adults reach a length of about 2.87 mm (0.113 in). They have a shiny and glabrous body, but the head has some short setae. The head is yellowish brown, with yellow mouthparts. The pronotum is reddish yellow and the scutellum is black. The elytra are yellowish brown, with a reddish brown band along the lateral margin, and each elytron with six black spots. The underside is brown and the legs are yellowish brown.

== Etymology ==
The species name is derived from Latin brachy and lobe and refers to the very short parameres.
