= Jauravia indica =

Scientific classification
- Kingdom: Animalia
- Phylum: Arthropoda
- Clade: Pancrustacea
- Class: Insecta
- Order: Coleoptera
- Suborder: Polyphaga
- Infraorder: Cucujiformia
- Family: Coccinellidae
- Genus: Jauravia
- Species: J. indica

Binomial name
- Jauravia indica Kapur, 1946

Species of beetle

Jauravia indica is a species of beetle of the family Coccinellidae. It is found in India (Nilgiri Mountains).

== Description ==
Adults reach a length of about 2.4 mm (0.094 in). The upper surface is bright yellowish brown with the external border of the pronotum and elytra lighter. The underside is yellowish brown.
