= Jauravia bicaullata =

Scientific classification
- Kingdom: Animalia
- Phylum: Arthropoda
- Clade: Pancrustacea
- Class: Insecta
- Order: Coleoptera
- Suborder: Polyphaga
- Infraorder: Cucujiformia
- Family: Coccinellidae
- Genus: Jauravia
- Species: J. bicaullata

Binomial name
- Jauravia bicaullata Singh & Singh, 2012

Species of beetle

Jauravia bicaullata is a species of beetle of the family Coccinellidae. It is found in India (Tamil Nadu).

== Description ==
Adults reach a length of about 2.8 mm (0.11 in). The head (including antennae and mouthparts), pronotum and scutellum are deep testaceous, while the eyes are black. The elytra are light to deep testaceous and the underside is mostly testaceous.
