= Neaptera purpurea =

Scientific classification
- Kingdom: Animalia
- Phylum: Arthropoda
- Clade: Pancrustacea
- Class: Insecta
- Order: Coleoptera
- Suborder: Polyphaga
- Infraorder: Cucujiformia
- Family: Coccinellidae
- Genus: Neaptera
- Species: N. purpurea

Binomial name
- Neaptera purpurea Gordon, 1991

Species of beetle

Neaptera purpurea is a species of beetle of the family Coccinellidae. It is found on the Virgin Islands.

== Description ==
Adults reach a length of about 1.2–1.3 mm. Adults are light yellowish brown, while the elytron is mostly dark metallic purple with greenish iridescence. The lateral and basal borders of the elytron, the head and pronotum are dark reddish brown.

== Etymology ==
The species name is Latin and refers to the metallic purple dorsal color.
