= Sticholotis hoabinhensis =

Scientific classification
- Kingdom: Animalia
- Phylum: Arthropoda
- Clade: Pancrustacea
- Class: Insecta
- Order: Coleoptera
- Suborder: Polyphaga
- Infraorder: Cucujiformia
- Family: Coccinellidae
- Genus: Sticholotis
- Species: S. hoabinhensis

Binomial name
- Sticholotis hoabinhensis Hoang, 1982

Species of beetle

Sticholotis hoabinhensis is a species of beetle of the family Coccinellidae. It is found in China (Yunnan) and Vietnam.

== Description ==
Adults reach a length of about 2.31–2.57 mm (0.091–0.101 in). They have a shiny and glabrous body, but with some short setae on the head. The head is dark brown, with brown mouthparts. The pronotum and scutellum are black, while the elytra have a yellow to red disc and black margins. The underside is dark brown with brown legs.
