= Nexophallus lindemanni =

Scientific classification
- Kingdom: Animalia
- Phylum: Arthropoda
- Clade: Pancrustacea
- Class: Insecta
- Order: Coleoptera
- Suborder: Polyphaga
- Infraorder: Cucujiformia
- Family: Coccinellidae
- Genus: Nexophallus
- Species: N. lindemanni

Binomial name
- Nexophallus lindemanni Gordon, 1977

Species of beetle

Nexophallus lindemanni is a species of beetle of the family Coccinellidae. It is found in Brazil.

== Description ==
Adults reach a length of about 2.10 mm. Adults are reddish black, while the head, pronotum and legs are black.

== Etymology ==
The species name is named for the collector of the type series.
