= Sticholotis carinica =

Scientific classification
- Kingdom: Animalia
- Phylum: Arthropoda
- Clade: Pancrustacea
- Class: Insecta
- Order: Coleoptera
- Suborder: Polyphaga
- Infraorder: Cucujiformia
- Family: Coccinellidae
- Genus: Sticholotis
- Species: S. carinica

Binomial name
- Sticholotis carinica (Gorham, 1895)

Synonyms
- Orcus carinica Gorham, 1895

Species of beetle

Sticholotis carinica is a species of beetle of the family Coccinellidae. It is found in China (Yunnan) and Myanmar.

== Description ==
Adults reach a length of about 2.27–2.67 mm (0.089–0.105 in). They have a shiny and glabrous body, but with some short setae on the head. The head is dark brown, while the pronotum and scutellum are black. The elytral disc is chestnut brown, with the suture and margins black. The ventral surface is dark brown.
