= Sticholotis quadriguttata =

Scientific classification
- Kingdom: Animalia
- Phylum: Arthropoda
- Clade: Pancrustacea
- Class: Insecta
- Order: Coleoptera
- Suborder: Polyphaga
- Infraorder: Cucujiformia
- Family: Coccinellidae
- Genus: Sticholotis
- Species: S. quadriguttata

Binomial name
- Sticholotis quadriguttata (Gorham, 1895)

Synonyms
- Orcus quadriguttatus Gorham, 1895

Species of beetle

Sticholotis quadriguttata is a species of beetle of the family Coccinellidae. It is found in Myanmar.

== Description ==
Adults reach a length of about 2.1 mm (0.083 in). The pronotum, scutellum and ground colour of the elytra are brownish black, while the head is dark reddish brown. Each elytron has two reddish brown spots along the mid-line of disk and the elytral and pronotal lateral margins are reddish brown. The underside is dark reddish brown.
