= Neotina =

Scientific classification
- Kingdom: Animalia
- Phylum: Arthropoda
- Clade: Pancrustacea
- Class: Insecta
- Order: Coleoptera
- Suborder: Polyphaga
- Infraorder: Cucujiformia
- Family: Coccinellidae
- Tribe: Sticholotidini
- Genus: Neotina; Gordon, 1977

Genus of insects

Neotina is a genus of beetles belonging to the family Coccinellidae.

== Species ==
- Neotina cariba Gordon, 1977
- Neotina schwarzi Gordon, 1994
