= Boschalis usambarica =

Scientific classification
- Kingdom: Animalia
- Phylum: Arthropoda
- Clade: Pancrustacea
- Class: Insecta
- Order: Coleoptera
- Suborder: Polyphaga
- Infraorder: Cucujiformia
- Family: Coccinellidae
- Genus: Boschalis
- Species: B. usambarica

Binomial name
- Boschalis usambarica Weise, 1897

Species of beetle

Boschalis usambarica is a species of beetle of the family Coccinellidae. It is found in Tanzania and the Democratic Republic of the Congo.

== Description ==
Adults reach a length of about 2–2.4 mm (0.079–0.094 in). They are rust-red, but the head and pronotum are brown. The head and pronotum have sparse, white pubescence. The underside is red.
