= Lenasa =

Scientific classification
- Kingdom: Animalia
- Phylum: Arthropoda
- Clade: Pancrustacea
- Class: Insecta
- Order: Coleoptera
- Suborder: Polyphaga
- Infraorder: Cucujiformia
- Family: Coccinellidae
- Tribe: Sticholotidini
- Genus: Lenasa; Gordon, 1994

Genus of beetles

Lenasa is a genus of lady beetles in the family Coccinellidae.

== Species ==
- Lenasa jayuyai Gordon, 1994
