= Nelasa iricolor =

Scientific classification
- Kingdom: Animalia
- Phylum: Arthropoda
- Clade: Pancrustacea
- Class: Insecta
- Order: Coleoptera
- Suborder: Polyphaga
- Infraorder: Cucujiformia
- Family: Coccinellidae
- Genus: Nelasa
- Species: N. iricolor

Binomial name
- Nelasa iricolor Gordon, 1991

Species of beetle

Nelasa iricolor is a species of beetle of the family Coccinellidae. It is found in Jamaica.

== Description ==
Adults reach a length of about 1.5 mm. Adults are black, the elytron with a purple, coppery metallic sheen, the pronotum with a green, metallic coppery sheen and the head with a purple metallic sheen.
