= Neaptera =

Scientific classification
- Kingdom: Animalia
- Phylum: Arthropoda
- Clade: Pancrustacea
- Class: Insecta
- Order: Coleoptera
- Suborder: Polyphaga
- Infraorder: Cucujiformia
- Family: Coccinellidae
- Tribe: Sticholotidini
- Genus: Neaptera; Gordon, 1991

Genus of beetles

Neaptera is a genus of lady beetles in the family Coccinellidae.

== Species ==
- Neaptera cubensis
- Neaptera dissita
- Neaptera doyeni
- Neaptera korschefskyi
- Neaptera purpurea
- Neaptera viola
- Neaptera viridissima
