= Sticholotis dadugangensis =

Scientific classification
- Kingdom: Animalia
- Phylum: Arthropoda
- Clade: Pancrustacea
- Class: Insecta
- Order: Coleoptera
- Suborder: Polyphaga
- Infraorder: Cucujiformia
- Family: Coccinellidae
- Genus: Sticholotis
- Species: S. dadugangensis

Binomial name
- Sticholotis dadugangensis Wang & Ren, 2017

Species of beetle

Sticholotis dadugangensis is a species of beetle of the family Coccinellidae. It is found in China (Yunnan).

== Description ==
Adults reach a length of about 2.7–2.9 mm (0.11–0.11 in). They have a shiny and glabrous body, but the head has some short setae. The head is reddish brown, with yellow mouthparts. The pronotum and scutellum are black and the elytra are also black, but each elytron with two yellowish spots. The underside is reddish brown and the legs are yellowish brown.

== Etymology ==
The species is named after Dadugang, its type locality.
