= Boschalis nigra =

Scientific classification
- Kingdom: Animalia
- Phylum: Arthropoda
- Clade: Pancrustacea
- Class: Insecta
- Order: Coleoptera
- Suborder: Polyphaga
- Infraorder: Cucujiformia
- Family: Coccinellidae
- Genus: Boschalis
- Species: B. nigra

Binomial name
- Boschalis nigra Weise, 1905

Species of beetle

Boschalis nigra is a species of beetle of the family Coccinellidae. It is found in Tanzania, Rwanda and South Africa (KwaZulu-Natal, Western Cape).

== Description ==
Adults reach a length of about 1.7–2.3 mm (0.067–0.091 in). The head is black, with long dense hairs. The pronotum is black, and less densely haired. The elytra are black. The underside is also black.
