= Chilocorellus tenuous =

Scientific classification
- Kingdom: Animalia
- Phylum: Arthropoda
- Clade: Pancrustacea
- Class: Insecta
- Order: Coleoptera
- Suborder: Polyphaga
- Infraorder: Cucujiformia
- Family: Coccinellidae
- Genus: Chilocorellus
- Species: C. tenuous

Binomial name
- Chilocorellus tenuous Wang & Ren, 2010

Species of beetle

Chilocorellus tenuous is a species of beetle of the family Coccinellidae. It is found in China (Yunnan).

== Description ==
Adults reach a length of about 2.37–2.5 mm (0.093–0.098 in). The dorsal and ventral surfaces are uniformly yellow.

== Etymology ==
The species name refers to the tenuous penis and tegmen of male genitalia.
