= Sticholotis hirashimai =

Scientific classification
- Kingdom: Animalia
- Phylum: Arthropoda
- Clade: Pancrustacea
- Class: Insecta
- Order: Coleoptera
- Suborder: Polyphaga
- Infraorder: Cucujiformia
- Family: Coccinellidae
- Genus: Sticholotis
- Species: S. hirashimai

Binomial name
- Sticholotis hirashimai Sasaji, 1967

Species of beetle

Sticholotis hirashimai is a species of beetle of the family Coccinellidae. It is found in China (Guizhou, Yunnan) and Taiwan.

== Description ==
Adults reach a length of about 2.47–2.77 mm (0.097–0.109 in). They have a shiny and glabrous body, but with some short setae on the head. The body is saddle brown with yellowish brown legs.
