= Jauravia kanarensis =

Scientific classification
- Kingdom: Animalia
- Phylum: Arthropoda
- Clade: Pancrustacea
- Class: Insecta
- Order: Coleoptera
- Suborder: Polyphaga
- Infraorder: Cucujiformia
- Family: Coccinellidae
- Genus: Jauravia
- Species: J. kanarensis

Binomial name
- Jauravia kanarensis Kapur, 1946

Species of beetle

Jauravia kanarensis is a species of beetle of the family Coccinellidae. It is found in India (Karnataka).

== Description ==
Adults reach a length of about 2.3 mm (0.091 in). The upper surface is testaceous, except for the black eyes and a black spot on each elytron. The underside is very light yellowish brown.
