= Boschalis hamatosiphonata =

Scientific classification
- Kingdom: Animalia
- Phylum: Arthropoda
- Clade: Pancrustacea
- Class: Insecta
- Order: Coleoptera
- Suborder: Polyphaga
- Infraorder: Cucujiformia
- Family: Coccinellidae
- Genus: Boschalis
- Species: B. hamatosiphonata

Binomial name
- Boschalis hamatosiphonata Fürsch, 1995

Species of beetle

Boschalis hamatosiphonata is a species of beetle of the family Coccinellidae. It is found in South Africa (Eastern Cape, Western Cape, KwaZulu-Natal).

== Description ==
Adults reach a length of about 2.3–2.9 mm (0.091–0.114 in). The head is black with fine, short white pubescence. The pronotum is black, but dark brown at the sides. The elytra are dark brownish-red, each with two yellowish-red spots. The underside and legs are brownish-yellow.

== Etymology ==
The species name is derived from Latin hamatus (meaning hooked, curved like a hook).
