= Sticholotis dohrni =

Scientific classification
- Kingdom: Animalia
- Phylum: Arthropoda
- Clade: Pancrustacea
- Class: Insecta
- Order: Coleoptera
- Suborder: Polyphaga
- Infraorder: Cucujiformia
- Family: Coccinellidae
- Genus: Sticholotis
- Species: S. dohrni

Binomial name
- Sticholotis dohrni Weise, 1885

Species of beetle

Sticholotis dohrni is a species of beetle of the family Coccinellidae. It is found in Myanmar.

== Description ==
Adults reach a length of about 2.65 mm (0.104 in). The head and pronotum are dark reddish brown, with the antennae dark yellowish brown. The scutellum is blackish and the elytra are reddish brown with black lateral margins and a black stripe along the suture. Each elytron has four black spots. The underside is dark reddish brown.
