= Neaptera viridissima =

Scientific classification
- Kingdom: Animalia
- Phylum: Arthropoda
- Clade: Pancrustacea
- Class: Insecta
- Order: Coleoptera
- Suborder: Polyphaga
- Infraorder: Cucujiformia
- Family: Coccinellidae
- Genus: Neaptera
- Species: N. viridissima

Binomial name
- Neaptera viridissima Gordon, 1991

Species of beetle

Neaptera viridissima is a species of beetle of the family Coccinellidae. It is found in Puerto Rico.

== Description ==
Adults reach a length of about 1.3–1.4 mm. Adults are light yellowish brown, while the elytron is metallic green and the head and pronotum are dark reddish brown.

== Etymology ==
The species name is Latin and refers to the metallic green dorsal coloration.
