= Nexophallus panamensis =

Scientific classification
- Kingdom: Animalia
- Phylum: Arthropoda
- Clade: Pancrustacea
- Class: Insecta
- Order: Coleoptera
- Suborder: Polyphaga
- Infraorder: Cucujiformia
- Family: Coccinellidae
- Genus: Nexophallus
- Species: N. panamensis

Binomial name
- Nexophallus panamensis González & Větrovec, 2021

Species of beetle

Nexophallus panamensis is a species of beetle of the family Coccinellidae. It is found in Panama.

== Description ==
Adults reach a length of about 1.4–1.6 mm (0.055–0.063 in). The head is black, while the antennae are yellow or reddish-brown to piceous. The pronotum, scutellum and elytra are shiny black. The ventral surface is mostly black, except for the dark brown abdomen. The legs are mostly black and the pubescence is white.

== Etymology ==
The species is named after Panama, the country where the specimens were collected.
