= Sticholotis cinctipennis =

Scientific classification
- Kingdom: Animalia
- Phylum: Arthropoda
- Clade: Pancrustacea
- Class: Insecta
- Order: Coleoptera
- Suborder: Polyphaga
- Infraorder: Cucujiformia
- Family: Coccinellidae
- Genus: Sticholotis
- Species: S. cinctipennis

Binomial name
- Sticholotis cinctipennis Weise, 1885

Species of beetle

Sticholotis cinctipennis is a species of beetle of the family Coccinellidae. It is found in China (Yunnan) and Thailand.

== Description ==
Adults reach a length of about 2.01–2.37 mm (0.079–0.093 in). They have a shiny and glabrous body, but the head has some short setae. The head is black, with yellow mouthparts. The elytra are reddish brown, with a black band along the lateral and basal margins and suture. The underside is dark brown and the legs are reddish brown.
