= Neaptera doyeni =

Scientific classification
- Kingdom: Animalia
- Phylum: Arthropoda
- Clade: Pancrustacea
- Class: Insecta
- Order: Coleoptera
- Suborder: Polyphaga
- Infraorder: Cucujiformia
- Family: Coccinellidae
- Genus: Neaptera
- Species: N. doyeni

Binomial name
- Neaptera doyeni Gordon, 1994

Species of beetle

Neaptera doyeni is a species of beetle of the family Coccinellidae. It is found in Puerto Rico.

== Description ==
Adults reach a length of about 1.3 mm. Adults are dark reddish brown without a metallic sheen.

== Etymology ==
The species is named for John Doyen, collector of the type series.
