= Neaptera dissita =

Scientific classification
- Kingdom: Animalia
- Phylum: Arthropoda
- Clade: Pancrustacea
- Class: Insecta
- Order: Coleoptera
- Suborder: Polyphaga
- Infraorder: Cucujiformia
- Family: Coccinellidae
- Genus: Neaptera
- Species: N. dissita

Binomial name
- Neaptera dissita Gordon, 1994

Species of beetle

Neaptera dissita is a species of beetle of the family Coccinellidae. It is found in Costa Rica.

== Description ==
Adults reach a length of about 1.4 mm. The head has a metallic green sheen. The apical one-third of the head is light reddish brown, while the remainder is dark brown. The pronotum is dark brown with a metallic green sheen and the elytron is black with a metallic purple sheen.

== Etymology ==
The species name is derived from Latin dissitus (meaning apart or remote) and refers to the mainland type locality.
