= Boschalis marginalis =

Scientific classification
- Kingdom: Animalia
- Phylum: Arthropoda
- Clade: Pancrustacea
- Class: Insecta
- Order: Coleoptera
- Suborder: Polyphaga
- Infraorder: Cucujiformia
- Family: Coccinellidae
- Genus: Boschalis
- Species: B. marginalis

Binomial name
- Boschalis marginalis Weise, 1898

Species of beetle

Boschalis marginalis is a species of beetle of the family Coccinellidae. It is found in Tanzania, Kenya, Uganda, Nigeria and Malawi.

== Description ==
Adults reach a length of about 2.5–2.7 mm (0.098–0.106 in). They are reddish-brown with a dark brown lateral margin on the elytra.
