= Nelasa =

Scientific classification
- Kingdom: Animalia
- Phylum: Arthropoda
- Clade: Pancrustacea
- Class: Insecta
- Order: Coleoptera
- Suborder: Polyphaga
- Infraorder: Cucujiformia
- Family: Coccinellidae
- Tribe: Sticholotidini
- Genus: Nelasa; Gordon, 1991

Genus of beetles

Nelasa is a genus of lady beetles in the family Coccinellidae.

== Species ==
- Nelasa beckeri
- Nelasa cubensis
- Nelasa dominicensis
- Nelasa duncansensis
- Nelasa erugonota
- Nelasa haitiensis
- Nelasa howdeni
- Nelasa iricolor
- Nelasa schwarzi
