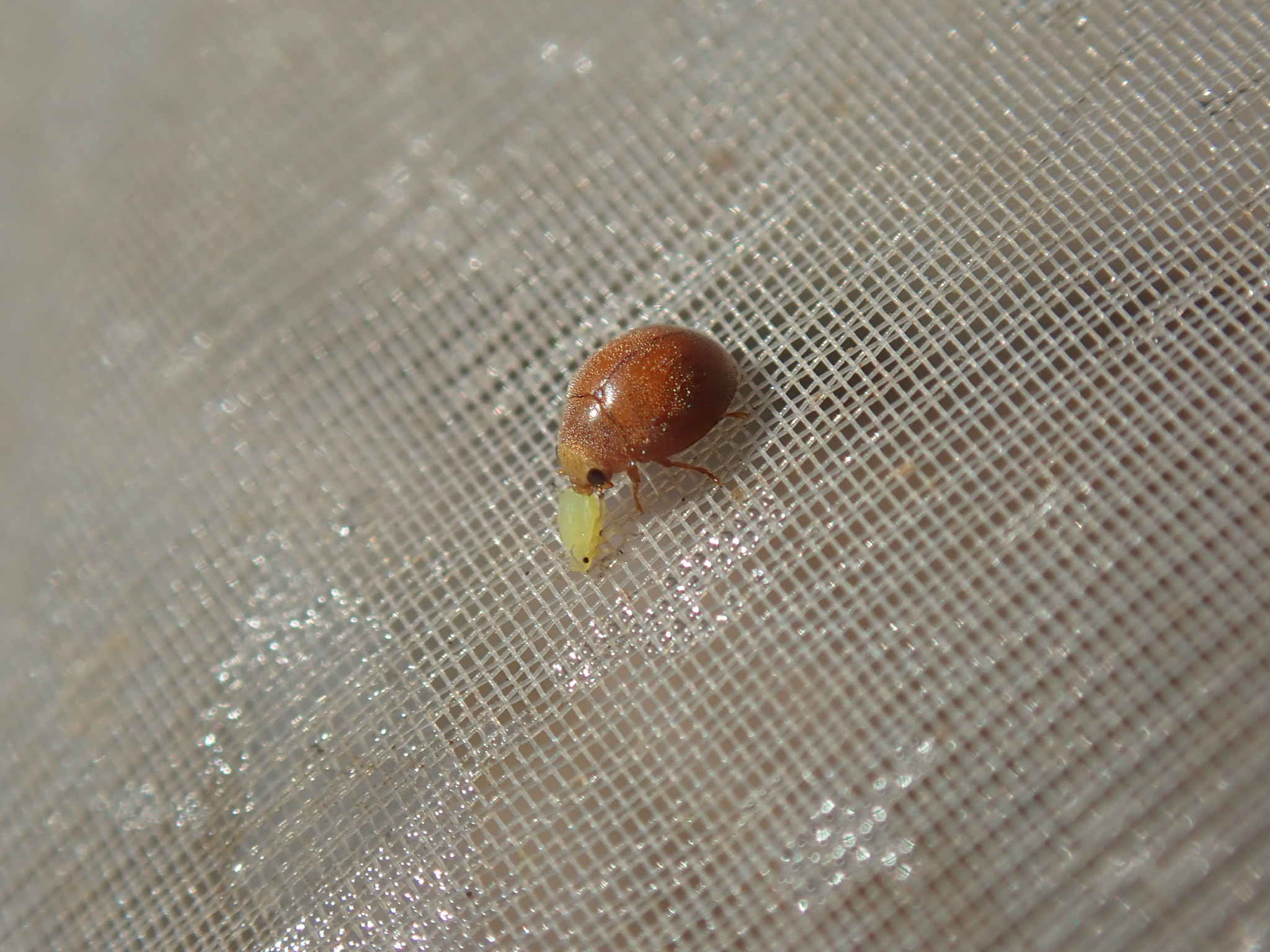
- Jauravia, Sri Lanka

Scientific classification
- Kingdom: Animalia
- Phylum: Arthropoda
- Clade: Pancrustacea
- Class: Insecta
- Order: Coleoptera
- Suborder: Polyphaga
- Infraorder: Cucujiformia
- Family: Coccinellidae
- Subfamily: Coccinellinae
- Tribe: Sticholotidini
- Genus: Jauravia; Motschoulsky, 1858

Synonyms
- Clanis Mulsant, 1850

= Jauravia =

Genus of beetles

Jauravia is a genus of lady beetles in the family Coccinellidae. There are more than 15 described species in Jauravia, found in South and Southeast Asia.

== Species ==
These species belong to the genus Jauravia:

- Jauravia albidula Motschulsky, 1866
- Jauravia assamensis Kapur, 1963
- Jauravia bicaullatus Singh & Singh, 2013
- Jauravia dorsalis (Weise, 1908)
- Jauravia hanifi Afroze & Shujauddin, 1998
- Jauravia indica Kapur, 1946
- Jauravia kanarensis Kapur, 1946
- Jauravia kapuri (Iablokoff-Khnzorian, 1972)
- Jauravia limbata Motschulsky, 1858
- Jauravia opaca (Weise, 1900)
- Jauravia pallidula Motschulsky, 1858
- Jauravia pilosula (Weise, 1900)
- Jauravia pubescens (Fabricius, 1798)
- Jauravia punjabensis Singh & Singh, 2013
- Jauravia quadrinotata Kapur, 1946
- Jauravia simplex (Walker, 1859)
- Jauravia soror (Weise, 1892)
