= Sticholotis ruficeps =

Scientific classification
- Kingdom: Animalia
- Phylum: Arthropoda
- Clade: Pancrustacea
- Class: Insecta
- Order: Coleoptera
- Suborder: Polyphaga
- Infraorder: Cucujiformia
- Family: Coccinellidae
- Genus: Sticholotis
- Species: S. ruficeps

Binomial name
- Sticholotis ruficeps Weise, 1902

Synonyms
- Sticholotis madagassa Weise, 1909; Mesopilo soufrierensis Duverger, 2002

Species of beetle

Sticholotis ruficeps is a species of beetle of the family Coccinellidae. It is found in China (Guangdong, Yunnan), Guadeloupe, the Mariana Islands, the United States, Mauritius, Australia, Madagascar, France, Vietnam, Malaysia, Singapore, Indonesia and Micronesia.

== Description ==
Adults reach a length of about 1.6–2.1 mm (0.063–0.083 in). They have a shiny and glabrous body, but the head has some short setae. The head is dark brown, with yellowish brown mouthparts. The pronotum and scutellum are brown and the elytra are dark brown, with a reddish brown lateral margin and each elytron with two dark red spots. The underside is reddish brown, while the legs are yellowish brown.

== Life history ==
Sticholotis ruficeps have been recorded preying on Pinnaspis buxi, Aulacaspis tegalensis and Melanaspis glomerata, as well as Dysmicoccus and Pseudaulacaspis species.
