= Paranelasa polita =

Scientific classification
- Kingdom: Animalia
- Phylum: Arthropoda
- Clade: Pancrustacea
- Class: Insecta
- Order: Coleoptera
- Suborder: Polyphaga
- Infraorder: Cucujiformia
- Family: Coccinellidae
- Genus: Paranelasa
- Species: P. polita

Binomial name
- Paranelasa polita Gordon, 1991

Species of beetle

Paranelasa polita is a species of beetle of the family Coccinellidae. It is found in Jamaica.

== Description ==
Adults reach a length of about 1.6-2 mm. Adults are black face with a metallic sheen.

== Etymology ==
The species name refers to the smooth, polished appearance of the dorsal surface.
