= Sticholotis petila =

Scientific classification
- Kingdom: Animalia
- Phylum: Arthropoda
- Clade: Pancrustacea
- Class: Insecta
- Order: Coleoptera
- Suborder: Polyphaga
- Infraorder: Cucujiformia
- Family: Coccinellidae
- Genus: Sticholotis
- Species: S. petila

Binomial name
- Sticholotis petila Yu & Pang, 1993

Species of beetle

Sticholotis petila is a species of beetle of the family Coccinellidae. It is found in China (Guangdong).

== Description ==
Adults reach a length of about 2.32–2.44 mm (0.091–0.096 in). They have a shiny and glabrous body, but the head has some short setae. The head is reddish brown, with yellow mouthparts. The pronotum is also reddish brown, but the scutellum is black and the elytra are dark brown, with a yellowish brown band along the lateral margins, and each elytron with two yellowish spots. The underside and legs are reddish brown.
