= Jauravia hanifi =

Scientific classification
- Kingdom: Animalia
- Phylum: Arthropoda
- Clade: Pancrustacea
- Class: Insecta
- Order: Coleoptera
- Suborder: Polyphaga
- Infraorder: Cucujiformia
- Family: Coccinellidae
- Genus: Jauravia
- Species: J. hanifi

Binomial name
- Jauravia hanifi Afroze & Shujauddin, 1998

Species of beetle

Jauravia hanifi is a species of beetle of the family Coccinellidae. It is found in India.

== Life history ==
They have been recorded preying on Aleurocanthus rugosa.
