= Parinesa =

Scientific classification
- Kingdom: Animalia
- Phylum: Arthropoda
- Clade: Pancrustacea
- Class: Insecta
- Order: Coleoptera
- Suborder: Polyphaga
- Infraorder: Cucujiformia
- Family: Coccinellidae
- Tribe: Sticholotidini
- Genus: Parinesa; Gordon, 1991

Genus of beetles

Parinesa is a genus of lady beetles in the family Coccinellidae.

== Species ==
Parinesa includes the following species:

- Parinesa anae
- Parinesa ariasi
- Parinesa bechynorum
- Parinesa carioca
- Parinesa gnoma
- Parinesa jolyi
- Parinesa lemae
- Parinesa minuta
- Parinesa saviniae
- Parinesa whiteheadi
