= Boschalis nigripes =

Scientific classification
- Kingdom: Animalia
- Phylum: Arthropoda
- Clade: Pancrustacea
- Class: Insecta
- Order: Coleoptera
- Suborder: Polyphaga
- Infraorder: Cucujiformia
- Family: Coccinellidae
- Genus: Boschalis
- Species: B. nigripes

Binomial name
- Boschalis nigripes Weise, 1909

Synonyms
- Boschalis marginalis var. nigripes Weise, 1909

Species of beetle

Boschalis nigripes is a species of beetle of the family Coccinellidae. It is found in Tanzania.

== Description ==
Adults reach a length of about 3 mm (0.12 in). They are black with reddish-brown elytra with black edges.
