= Sticholotis taiwanensis =

Scientific classification
- Kingdom: Animalia
- Phylum: Arthropoda
- Clade: Pancrustacea
- Class: Insecta
- Order: Coleoptera
- Suborder: Polyphaga
- Infraorder: Cucujiformia
- Family: Coccinellidae
- Genus: Sticholotis
- Species: S. taiwanensis

Binomial name
- Sticholotis taiwanensis Miyatake, 1982

Species of beetle

Sticholotis taiwanensis is a species of beetle of the family Coccinellidae. It is found in Taiwan.

== Description ==
Adults reach a length of about 2.27 mm (0.089 in). They have a shiny and glabrous body, but the head has some short setae. The head is black, with brown mouthparts. The pronotum is and scutellum are black and the elytra are black with yellowish brown lateral margins and with two pairs of dark red spots. The underside is black with dark brown legs.
