= Sticholotis linguiformis =

Scientific classification
- Kingdom: Animalia
- Phylum: Arthropoda
- Clade: Pancrustacea
- Class: Insecta
- Order: Coleoptera
- Suborder: Polyphaga
- Infraorder: Cucujiformia
- Family: Coccinellidae
- Genus: Sticholotis
- Species: S. linguiformis

Binomial name
- Sticholotis linguiformis Yu, 1995

Species of beetle

Sticholotis linguiformis is a species of beetle of the family Coccinellidae. It is found in Taiwan and China (Guangdong).

== Description ==
Adults reach a length of about 2–2.26 mm (0.079–0.089 in). They have a short, oval, strongly convex body, with whitish pubescence. The head is brown with black eyes and the pronotum is yellowish-brown. The elytra are brown with four pairs of brown spots. The underside, including legs, is yellowish-brown. Females are slightly darker.
