= Sticholotis punctata =

Scientific classification
- Kingdom: Animalia
- Phylum: Arthropoda
- Clade: Pancrustacea
- Class: Insecta
- Order: Coleoptera
- Suborder: Polyphaga
- Infraorder: Cucujiformia
- Family: Coccinellidae
- Genus: Sticholotis
- Species: S. punctata

Binomial name
- Sticholotis punctata Crotch, 1874

Synonyms
- Sticholotis rufosignata Weise, 1885

Species of beetle

Sticholotis punctata is a species of beetle of the family Coccinellidae. It is found in China (Anhui, Fujian, Guizhou, Hubei, Zhejiang), Japan, the Philippines and Malaysia.

== Description ==
Adults reach a length of about 2.1–2.49 mm (0.083–0.098 in). They have a shiny and glabrous body, but the head has some short setae. The head is reddish brown, with black mouthparts. The pronotum is black, with reddish anterior and lateral margins. The scutellum is black and the elytra are yellow to reddish brown, with six black spots. The underside is dark brown with yellow legs.
