= Sticholotis jinpingensis =

Scientific classification
- Kingdom: Animalia
- Phylum: Arthropoda
- Clade: Pancrustacea
- Class: Insecta
- Order: Coleoptera
- Suborder: Polyphaga
- Infraorder: Cucujiformia
- Family: Coccinellidae
- Genus: Sticholotis
- Species: S. jinpingensis

Binomial name
- Sticholotis jinpingensis Wang & Ren, 2017

Species of beetle

Sticholotis jinpingensis is a species of beetle of the family Coccinellidae. It is found in China (Yunnan).

== Description ==
Adults reach a length of about 2.41–2.8 mm (0.095–0.110 in). They have a shiny and glabrous body, but the head has some short setae. The head, pronotum and scutellum are yellow and the elytra are also yellow, but each elytron with four black spots. The underside and legs are yellow.

== Etymology ==
The species is named after Jinping, its type locality.
