= Jauravia pallidula =

Scientific classification
- Kingdom: Animalia
- Phylum: Arthropoda
- Clade: Pancrustacea
- Class: Insecta
- Order: Coleoptera
- Suborder: Polyphaga
- Infraorder: Cucujiformia
- Family: Coccinellidae
- Genus: Jauravia
- Species: J. pallidula

Binomial name
- Jauravia pallidula Motschulsky, 1858

Species of beetle

Jauravia pallidula, is a species of lady beetle native to India, and Sri Lanka.

== Description ==
Body length is about 3.20 to 4.20 mm. Body broadly oval to circular. Dorsum moderately convex and clothed with silvery white hairy pubescence. Body uniformly yellowish to reddish brown. Antennae with 11 antennomeres. Terminal palpomere of maxilla is elongate and apically obliquely transverse. Prosternal process is broad. Abdomen has five visible ventrites. Adults are deep testaceous, whereas younger ones are much lighter. Head testaceous. Clypeus, mouth-parts and antennae are light fulvous. Eyes are black. Rest of the dorsum is deep testaceous in color. Ventrum alo testaceous. Epipleura is light fulvous. Head covered with very fine and sparse punctures and clothed with short, whitish and sparse pubescence. Pronotum moderately emarginate anteriorly. Pronotal punctation is fine and close, and clothed with white, short and dense pubescence. Elytra lacks a prominent humerus. Elytral punctures are fine, deep and close. Elytral interspaces are narrow with whitish, short and dense pubescence. Ventrum finely and sparsely punctate, with yellowish white, very delicate, short and sparse pubescence.

It is a predator of Coccus viridis, and Aleurotrachelus atratus.
