= Lenasa jayuyai =

Scientific classification
- Kingdom: Animalia
- Phylum: Arthropoda
- Clade: Pancrustacea
- Class: Insecta
- Order: Coleoptera
- Suborder: Polyphaga
- Infraorder: Cucujiformia
- Family: Coccinellidae
- Genus: Lenasa
- Species: L. jayuyai

Binomial name
- Lenasa jayuyai Gordon, 1994

Species of beetle

Lenasa jayuyai is a species of beetle of the family Coccinellidae. It is found in Puerto Rico.

== Description ==
Adults reach a length of about 1.4–1.6 mm. Adults are black with a metallic green sheen.

== Etymology ==
The species is named for the type locality.
