= Semiviride =

Scientific classification
- Kingdom: Animalia
- Phylum: Arthropoda
- Clade: Pancrustacea
- Class: Insecta
- Order: Coleoptera
- Suborder: Polyphaga
- Infraorder: Cucujiformia
- Family: Coccinellidae
- Tribe: Sticholotidini
- Genus: Semiviride; Gordon, 1991

Genus of beetles

Semiviride is a genus of lady beetles in the family Coccinellidae.

== Species ==
- Semiviride loisobrienae Gordon, 1991
- Semiviride portoricensis Gordon, 1991
