= Sticholotis wuzhishana =

Scientific classification
- Kingdom: Animalia
- Phylum: Arthropoda
- Clade: Pancrustacea
- Class: Insecta
- Order: Coleoptera
- Suborder: Polyphaga
- Infraorder: Cucujiformia
- Family: Coccinellidae
- Genus: Sticholotis
- Species: S. wuzhishana

Binomial name
- Sticholotis wuzhishana Wang & Ren, 2017

Species of beetle

Sticholotis wuzhishana is a species of beetle of the family Coccinellidae. It is found in China (Hainan).

== Description ==
Adults reach a length of about 2.8–2.9 mm (0.11–0.11 in). They have a shiny and glabrous body, but the head has some short setae. The head is dark reddish brown. The pronotum is reddish brown and the scutellum is dark brown. The elytra are yellowish brown, with a reddish band along the lateral margin, and each elytron with six black spots. The underside is dark brown and the legs are yellowish brown.

== Etymology ==
The species is named after Wuzhishan, its type locality.
