= Sticholotis latissima =

Scientific classification
- Kingdom: Animalia
- Phylum: Arthropoda
- Clade: Pancrustacea
- Class: Insecta
- Order: Coleoptera
- Suborder: Polyphaga
- Infraorder: Cucujiformia
- Family: Coccinellidae
- Genus: Sticholotis
- Species: S. latissima

Binomial name
- Sticholotis latissima Wang & Ren, 2017

Species of beetle

Sticholotis latissima is a species of beetle of the family Coccinellidae. It is found in China (Hainan).

== Description ==
Adults reach a length of about 2.67–2.9 mm (0.105–0.114 in). They have a shiny and glabrous body, but the head has some short setae. The head is yellowish brown, with yellow mouthparts and antennae. The pronotum is yellowish brown and the scutellum dark reddish brown. The elytra are yellow, with a reddish band along the anterior and lateral margins and a dark reddish brown sutural band. Each elytron has two black spots. The underside and legs are yellow.

== Etymology ==
The species name is derived from Latin latissimum (meaning very wide) and refers to the extremely wide penis and penis guide.
