= Sticholotis simplifulva =

Scientific classification
- Kingdom: Animalia
- Phylum: Arthropoda
- Clade: Pancrustacea
- Class: Insecta
- Order: Coleoptera
- Suborder: Polyphaga
- Infraorder: Cucujiformia
- Family: Coccinellidae
- Genus: Sticholotis
- Species: S. simplifulva

Binomial name
- Sticholotis simplifulva Wang & Ren, 2017

Species of beetle

Sticholotis simplifulva is a species of beetle of the family Coccinellidae. It is found in China (Yunnan).

== Description ==
Adults reach a length of about 2.18–2.77 mm (0.086–0.109 in). They have a shiny and glabrous body, but with some short setae on the head. The whole body is yellow.

== Etymology ==
The species name is derived from Latin simplus and fulvus and refers to golden elytra without spots.
