= Sticholotis crassa =

Scientific classification
- Kingdom: Animalia
- Phylum: Arthropoda
- Clade: Pancrustacea
- Class: Insecta
- Order: Coleoptera
- Suborder: Polyphaga
- Infraorder: Cucujiformia
- Family: Coccinellidae
- Genus: Sticholotis
- Species: S. crassa

Binomial name
- Sticholotis crassa Wang & Ren, 2017

Species of beetle

Sticholotis crassa is a species of beetle of the family Coccinellidae. It is found in China (Yunnan).

== Description ==
Adults reach a length of about 2.31–2.54 mm (0.091–0.100 in). They have a shiny and glabrous body. The head is yellowish brown, with yellow mouthparts. The pronotum and scutellum are yellowish brown and the elytra are yellow, each elytron with four black spots. The underside is yellowish brown and the legs are yellow.

== Etymology ==
The species name is derived from Latin crassa and refers to the very thick penis guide in lateral view.
