= Nelasa duncansensis =

Scientific classification
- Kingdom: Animalia
- Phylum: Arthropoda
- Clade: Pancrustacea
- Class: Insecta
- Order: Coleoptera
- Suborder: Polyphaga
- Infraorder: Cucujiformia
- Family: Coccinellidae
- Genus: Nelasa
- Species: N. duncansensis

Binomial name
- Nelasa duncansensis Gordon, 1991

Species of beetle

Nelasa duncansensis is a species of beetle of the family Coccinellidae. It is found in Jamaica.

== Description ==
Adults reach a length of about 1.4–1.6 mm. Adults are dark brown with a green metallic sheen. The head and pronotum are darker than the elytron. The latter has a faint green metallic sheen.

== Etymology ==
The species is named for the type locality.
