= Sticholotis octopunctata =

Scientific classification
- Kingdom: Animalia
- Phylum: Arthropoda
- Clade: Pancrustacea
- Class: Insecta
- Order: Coleoptera
- Suborder: Polyphaga
- Infraorder: Cucujiformia
- Family: Coccinellidae
- Genus: Sticholotis
- Species: S. octopunctata

Binomial name
- Sticholotis octopunctata Wang & Ren, 2017

Species of beetle

Sticholotis octopunctata is a species of beetle of the family Coccinellidae. It is found in China (Yunnan).

== Description ==
Adults reach a length of about 2.51–2.93 mm (0.099–0.115 in). They have a shiny and glabrous body, but the head has some short setae. The head, pronotum and scutellum are yellowish brown and the elytra are yellow, each elytron with four black spots. The underside and legs are yellowish brown.

== Etymology ==
The species name is derived from Latin octo and punctatus and refers to the elytra with eight black spots.
