= Boschalis kamerunensis =

Scientific classification
- Kingdom: Animalia
- Phylum: Arthropoda
- Clade: Pancrustacea
- Class: Insecta
- Order: Coleoptera
- Suborder: Polyphaga
- Infraorder: Cucujiformia
- Family: Coccinellidae
- Genus: Boschalis
- Species: B. kamerunensis

Binomial name
- Boschalis kamerunensis Mader, 1954

Species of beetle

Boschalis kamerunensis is a species of beetle of the family Coccinellidae. It is found in Cameroon.

== Description ==
Adults reach a length of about 2.3–2.7 mm (0.091–0.106 in). The head is black and the pronotum is also black, but with white pubescence. The elytra have a black margin with long white hairs. The underside is red, while the legs and underside of the head are black.
