= Sticholotis obesa =

Scientific classification
- Kingdom: Animalia
- Phylum: Arthropoda
- Clade: Pancrustacea
- Class: Insecta
- Order: Coleoptera
- Suborder: Polyphaga
- Infraorder: Cucujiformia
- Family: Coccinellidae
- Genus: Sticholotis
- Species: S. obesa

Binomial name
- Sticholotis obesa Wang & Ren, 2017

Species of beetle

Sticholotis obesa is a species of beetle of the family Coccinellidae. It is found in China (Guizhou, Hubei, Hunan).

== Description ==
Adults reach a length of about 2.34–2.7 mm (0.092–0.106 in). They have a shiny and glabrous body, but there are some short setae on the head. The head and pronotum are yellowish brown and the scutellum is brown. The elytra are yellow, each elytron with six black spots. The underside is brown and the legs are yellowish brown.

== Etymology ==
The species name is derived from Latin obesus and refers to the thick penis.
