= Chilocorellus quadrimaculatus =

Scientific classification
- Kingdom: Animalia
- Phylum: Arthropoda
- Clade: Pancrustacea
- Class: Insecta
- Order: Coleoptera
- Suborder: Polyphaga
- Infraorder: Cucujiformia
- Family: Coccinellidae
- Genus: Chilocorellus
- Species: C. quadrimaculatus

Binomial name
- Chilocorellus quadrimaculatus Wang & Ren, 2010

Species of beetle

Chilocorellus quadrimaculatus is a species of beetle of the family Coccinellidae. It is found in China (Yunnan).

== Description ==
Adults reach a length of about 2.38–2.67 mm (0.094–0.105 in). The head is yellow, with silver grey eyes. The pronotum and scutellum are yellow and the elytra are also yellow, but each with two black spots. The underside is yellow.

== Etymology ==
The species name refers to the elytra with four black spots.
