= Sticholotis robusta =

Scientific classification
- Kingdom: Animalia
- Phylum: Arthropoda
- Clade: Pancrustacea
- Class: Insecta
- Order: Coleoptera
- Suborder: Polyphaga
- Infraorder: Cucujiformia
- Family: Coccinellidae
- Genus: Sticholotis
- Species: S. robusta

Binomial name
- Sticholotis robusta Wang & Ren, 2017

Species of beetle

Sticholotis robusta is a species of beetle of the family Coccinellidae. It is found in China (Guizhou).

== Description ==
Adults reach a length of about 2.47–3.07 mm (0.097–0.121 in). They have a shiny and glabrous body, but there are some short setae on the head. The head is yellowish brown, with yellow mouthparts. The pronotum is yellowish brown and the scutellum is dark brown. The elytra are yellowish brown, each elytron with six black spots. The underside is yellow.

== Etymology ==
The species name is derived from Latin robustus and refers to the stout penis.
