= Sticholotis bipunctata =

Scientific classification
- Kingdom: Animalia
- Phylum: Arthropoda
- Clade: Pancrustacea
- Class: Insecta
- Order: Coleoptera
- Suborder: Polyphaga
- Infraorder: Cucujiformia
- Family: Coccinellidae
- Genus: Sticholotis
- Species: S. bipunctata

Binomial name
- Sticholotis bipunctata (Gorham, 1895)

Synonyms
- Orcus bipunctatus Gorham, 1895

Species of beetle

Sticholotis bipunctata is a species of beetle of the family Coccinellidae. It is found in Myanmar.

== Description ==
Adults reach a length of about 3 mm (0.12 in). The head and pronotum are dark reddish brown, with the mouthparts and antennae yellowish brown. The scutellum is black and the elytra are reddish brown with a black stripe along the suture, and each elytron with two black spots. The underside is dark reddish brown.
