= Boschalis podagrica =

Scientific classification
- Kingdom: Animalia
- Phylum: Arthropoda
- Clade: Pancrustacea
- Class: Insecta
- Order: Coleoptera
- Suborder: Polyphaga
- Infraorder: Cucujiformia
- Family: Coccinellidae
- Genus: Boschalis
- Species: B. podagrica

Binomial name
- Boschalis podagrica Weise, 1898

Species of beetle

Boschalis podagrica is a species of beetle of the family Coccinellidae. It is found in Cameroon.

== Description ==
Adults reach a length of about 2.5 mm (0.098 in). The head and pronotum are rust-red and pubescent. The elytra are with distinct punctation on a smooth, shiny surface.
