= Sticholotis flammula =

Scientific classification
- Kingdom: Animalia
- Phylum: Arthropoda
- Clade: Pancrustacea
- Class: Insecta
- Order: Coleoptera
- Suborder: Polyphaga
- Infraorder: Cucujiformia
- Family: Coccinellidae
- Genus: Sticholotis
- Species: S. flammula

Binomial name
- Sticholotis flammula Wang & Ren, 2017

Species of beetle

Sticholotis flammula is a species of beetle of the family Coccinellidae. It is found in China (Guizhou).

== Description ==
Adults reach a length of about 2.27 mm (0.089 in). They have a shiny and glabrous body, but with some short setae on the head. The head is dark brown, with brown mouthparts. The pronotum is black, usually with a reddish brown anterior margin and lateral sides. The scutellum is black and the elytra are dark brown with reddish brown lateral margins and each elytron with a C-shaped spot. The underside is dark brown.

== Etymology ==
The species name is derived from Latin flammula and refers to the flame-shaped maculae on the elytra.
