= Sticholotis maolanensis =

Scientific classification
- Kingdom: Animalia
- Phylum: Arthropoda
- Clade: Pancrustacea
- Class: Insecta
- Order: Coleoptera
- Suborder: Polyphaga
- Infraorder: Cucujiformia
- Family: Coccinellidae
- Genus: Sticholotis
- Species: S. maolanensis

Binomial name
- Sticholotis maolanensis Wang & Ren, 2017

Species of beetle

Sticholotis maolanensis is a species of beetle of the family Coccinellidae. It is found in China (Guizhou).

== Description ==
Adults reach a length of about 2.24–2.97 mm (0.088–0.117 in). They have a shiny and glabrous body, but the head has some short setae. The head is yellowish brown, with yellow mouthparts. The pronotum is dark red and the scutellum is dark brown. The elytra are reddish brown, with a dark red band along the lateral margin, and each elytron with six black spots. The underside is dark brown and the legs are yellowish brown.

== Etymology ==
The species is named after the Maolan National Natural Reserve, its type locality.
