= Nelasa dominicensis =

Scientific classification
- Kingdom: Animalia
- Phylum: Arthropoda
- Clade: Pancrustacea
- Class: Insecta
- Order: Coleoptera
- Suborder: Polyphaga
- Infraorder: Cucujiformia
- Family: Coccinellidae
- Genus: Nelasa
- Species: N. dominicensis

Binomial name
- Nelasa dominicensis Gordon, 1991

Species of beetle

Nelasa dominicensis is a species of beetle of the family Coccinellidae. It is found in the Dominican Republic.

== Description ==
Adults reach a length of about 1.5–1.6 mm. Adults are dark brown with a metallic greenish sheen, except for the lateral margin of the elytron which is light brown.

== Etymology ==
The species is named for the country of origin.
