= Nelasa erugonota =

Scientific classification
- Kingdom: Animalia
- Phylum: Arthropoda
- Clade: Pancrustacea
- Class: Insecta
- Order: Coleoptera
- Suborder: Polyphaga
- Infraorder: Cucujiformia
- Family: Coccinellidae
- Genus: Nelasa
- Species: N. erugonota

Binomial name
- Nelasa erugonota Gordon, 1991

Species of beetle

Nelasa erugonota is a species of beetle of the family Coccinellidae. It is found in Jamaica.

== Description ==
Adults reach a length of about 1.5 mm. Adults are black with a blue metallic sheen.

== Etymology ==
The species name is derived from Latin erugo (meaning smooth) and refers to the smooth pronotal surface.
