= Sticholotis wenchangia =

Scientific classification
- Kingdom: Animalia
- Phylum: Arthropoda
- Clade: Pancrustacea
- Class: Insecta
- Order: Coleoptera
- Suborder: Polyphaga
- Infraorder: Cucujiformia
- Family: Coccinellidae
- Genus: Sticholotis
- Species: S. wenchangia

Binomial name
- Sticholotis wenchangia Wang & Ren, 2017

Species of beetle

Sticholotis wenchangia is a species of beetle of the family Coccinellidae. It is found in China (Hainan).

== Description ==
Adults reach a length of about 2.18–2.27 mm (0.086–0.089 in). They have a shiny and glabrous body, but the head has some short setae. The head is orange and the pronotum and scutellum are brown. The elytra are brown, with a yellowish brown lateral margin and each elytron with two yellowish spots. The underside is yellow.

== Etymology ==
The species is named after Wenchang, its type locality.
