= Sticholotis discoidea =

Scientific classification
- Kingdom: Animalia
- Phylum: Arthropoda
- Clade: Pancrustacea
- Class: Insecta
- Order: Coleoptera
- Suborder: Polyphaga
- Infraorder: Cucujiformia
- Family: Coccinellidae
- Genus: Sticholotis
- Species: S. discoidea

Binomial name
- Sticholotis discoidea (Gorham, 1895)

Synonyms
- Orcus discoideus Gorham, 1895

Species of beetle

Sticholotis discoidea is a species of beetle of the family Coccinellidae. It is found in Myanmar.

== Description ==
Adults reach a length of about 2.5–2.8 mm (0.098–0.110 in). The head, pronotum and elytra (along the lateral and apical margins) are brownish black, while the scutellum is infuscate. The disc of the elytra is pale reddish brown.
