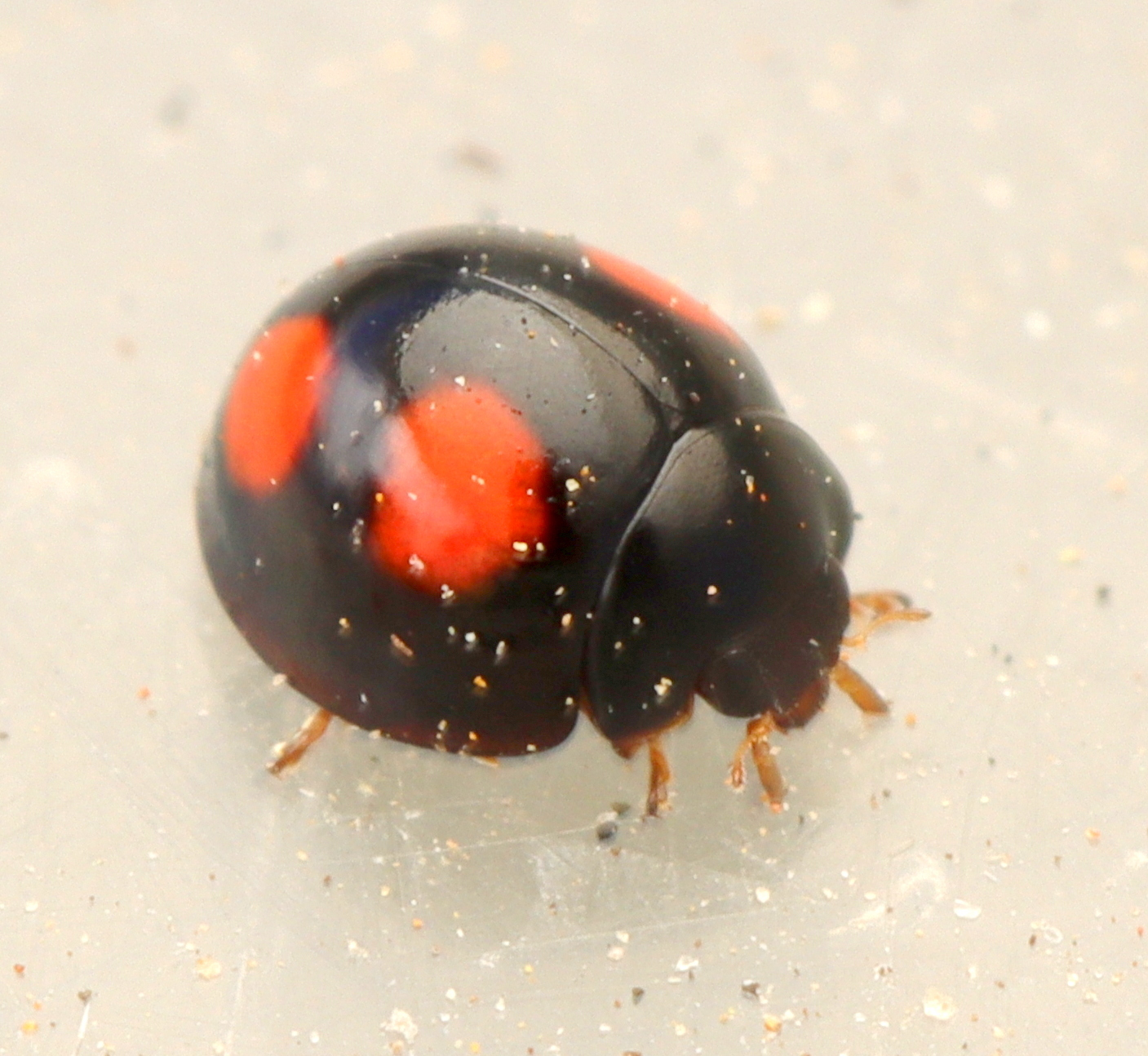

Scientific classification
- Kingdom: Animalia
- Phylum: Arthropoda
- Clade: Pancrustacea
- Class: Insecta
- Order: Coleoptera
- Suborder: Polyphaga
- Infraorder: Cucujiformia
- Family: Coccinellidae
- Tribe: Sticholotidini
- Genus: Lotis; Mulsant, 1850

Species
- Lotis neglecta Mulsant 1850; Lotis nigerrima Casey 1899; Lotis nigritula Crotch 1874

= Lotis (beetle) =

Genus of beetles

Lotis is a genus of lady beetles.
