= Neotina schwarzi =

Scientific classification
- Kingdom: Animalia
- Phylum: Arthropoda
- Clade: Pancrustacea
- Class: Insecta
- Order: Coleoptera
- Suborder: Polyphaga
- Infraorder: Cucujiformia
- Family: Coccinellidae
- Genus: Neotina
- Species: N. schwarzi

Binomial name
- Neotina schwarzi Gordon, 1994

Species of beetle

Neotina schwarzi is a species of beetle of the family Coccinellidae. It is found in Cuba.

== Description ==
Adults reach a length of about 1.4 mm. Adults are reddish brown with a dark reddish brown head with a greenish blue sheen. The pronotum is dark reddish brown with a greenish sheen and the elytron is light brown with a greenish sheen.

== Etymology ==
The species is named for E. A. Schwarz, the collector of the type specimen.
