= Sticholotis clavata =

Scientific classification
- Kingdom: Animalia
- Phylum: Arthropoda
- Clade: Pancrustacea
- Class: Insecta
- Order: Coleoptera
- Suborder: Polyphaga
- Infraorder: Cucujiformia
- Family: Coccinellidae
- Genus: Sticholotis
- Species: S. clavata

Binomial name
- Sticholotis clavata Wang & Ren, 2017

Species of beetle

Sticholotis clavata is a species of beetle of the family Coccinellidae. It is found in China (Yunnan).

== Description ==
Adults reach a length of about 2.26–2.7 mm (0.089–0.106 in). They have a shiny and glabrous body. The head, pronotum and scutellum are yellow and the elytra are also yellow, but each elytron with four black spots. The underside is yellow.

== Etymology ==
The species name is derived from Latin clavatus and refers to the shape of the parameres.
