= Neaptera korschefskyi =

Scientific classification
- Kingdom: Animalia
- Phylum: Arthropoda
- Clade: Pancrustacea
- Class: Insecta
- Order: Coleoptera
- Suborder: Polyphaga
- Infraorder: Cucujiformia
- Family: Coccinellidae
- Genus: Neaptera
- Species: N. korschefskyi

Binomial name
- Neaptera korschefskyi (Duverger, 1986)

Synonyms
- Nexophallus korschefskyi Duverger, 1986

Species of beetle

Neaptera korschefskyi is a species of beetle of the family Coccinellidae. It is found in Guadeloupe.

== Description ==
Adults reach a length of about 1.6 millimetres (0.063 in). Adults are dark metallic blue, with some coppery violet iridescence.
