= Semiviride portoricensis =

Scientific classification
- Kingdom: Animalia
- Phylum: Arthropoda
- Clade: Pancrustacea
- Class: Insecta
- Order: Coleoptera
- Suborder: Polyphaga
- Infraorder: Cucujiformia
- Family: Coccinellidae
- Genus: Semiviride
- Species: S. portoricensis

Binomial name
- Semiviride portoricensis Gordon, 1991

Species of beetle

Semiviride portoricensis is a species of beetle of the family Coccinellidae. It is found in Puerto Rico.

== Description ==
Adults reach a length of about 1.75 mm. Adults are black with a blue green sheen.

== Etymology ==
The species is named for country of origin.
