= Sticholotis pictipennis =

Scientific classification
- Kingdom: Animalia
- Phylum: Arthropoda
- Clade: Pancrustacea
- Class: Insecta
- Order: Coleoptera
- Suborder: Polyphaga
- Infraorder: Cucujiformia
- Family: Coccinellidae
- Genus: Sticholotis
- Species: S. pictipennis

Binomial name
- Sticholotis pictipennis Lewis, 1896

Species of beetle

Sticholotis pictipennis is a species of beetle of the family Coccinellidae. It is found in Japan (Kyushu) and possibly China.

== Description ==
Adults are similar to Sticholotis punctum, but can be distinguished by the absence of anterior elytral spots.
