= Sticholotis undecimpunctata =

Scientific classification
- Kingdom: Animalia
- Phylum: Arthropoda
- Clade: Pancrustacea
- Class: Insecta
- Order: Coleoptera
- Suborder: Polyphaga
- Infraorder: Cucujiformia
- Family: Coccinellidae
- Genus: Sticholotis
- Species: S. undecimpunctata

Binomial name
- Sticholotis undecimpunctata Miyatake, 1982

Species of beetle

Sticholotis undecimpunctata is a species of beetle of the family Coccinellidae. It is found in Taiwan.

== Description ==
Adults reach a length of about 3.2 mm (0.13 in). The head is reddish testaceous, with yellowish testaceous mouthparts and yellowish antennae. The pronotum is reddish brown with a pair of blackish markings before the base. The scutellum is reddish testaceous and the elytra are yellowish with reddish brown lateral margins, and each elytron with six black spots. The underside and legs are reddish brown.
