= Neaptera viola =

Scientific classification
- Kingdom: Animalia
- Phylum: Arthropoda
- Clade: Pancrustacea
- Class: Insecta
- Order: Coleoptera
- Suborder: Polyphaga
- Infraorder: Cucujiformia
- Family: Coccinellidae
- Genus: Neaptera
- Species: N. viola

Binomial name
- Neaptera viola Gordon, 1991

Species of beetle

Neaptera viola is a species of beetle of the family Coccinellidae. It is found in Guadeloupe.

== Description ==
Adults reach a length of about 1.4 mm. Adults are brown, while the elytron is dark metallic purple with violet iridescence and the pronotum is dark purple with dark reddish brown anterior and lateral margins.

== Etymology ==
The species name is Latin and refers to the predominantly metallic violet tint of the elytron.
