= Sticholotis rufoplagiata =

Scientific classification
- Kingdom: Animalia
- Phylum: Arthropoda
- Class: Insecta
- Order: Coleoptera
- Family: Coccinellidae
- Genus: Sticholotis
- Species: S. rufoplagiata

Binomial name
- Sticholotis rufoplagiata (Motschoulsky, 1866)

Synonyms
- Chilocorus rufoplagiatus Motschulsky, 1866; Sticholotis rufoplagiatus Bielawski, 1960

Species of beetle

Sticholotis rufoplagiata is a species of lady beetle found in Sri Lanka.
