= Jauravia quadrinotata =

Scientific classification
- Kingdom: Animalia
- Phylum: Arthropoda
- Clade: Pancrustacea
- Class: Insecta
- Order: Coleoptera
- Suborder: Polyphaga
- Infraorder: Cucujiformia
- Family: Coccinellidae
- Genus: Jauravia
- Species: J. quadrinotata

Binomial name
- Jauravia quadrinotata Kapur, 1946

Species of beetle

Jauravia quadrinotata is a species of beetle of the family Coccinellidae. It is found in India (Assam).

== Description ==
Adults reach a length of about 2.5 mm (0.098 in). The head is brown with grey eyes grey. The pronotum and elytra are brown, the latter with a slightly darker discal area and each elytron with two black spots. The underside is testaceous.
