= Sticholotis =

Scientific classification
- Kingdom: Animalia
- Phylum: Arthropoda
- Clade: Pancrustacea
- Class: Insecta
- Order: Coleoptera
- Suborder: Polyphaga
- Infraorder: Cucujiformia
- Family: Coccinellidae
- Subfamily: Coccinellinae
- Tribe: Sticholotidini
- Genus: Sticholotis; Crotch, 1874

Synonyms
- Gymnoscymnus Blackburn, 1892; Mesopilo Duverger, 2002

Genus of beetles

Sticholotis is a genus of beetles belonging to the family Coccinellidae.

== Species ==
- Sticholotis acutifolia
- Sticholotis amabilis
- Sticholotis amator
- Sticholotis banksi
- Sticholotis besucheti
- Sticholotis bilineata
- Sticholotis binotata
- Sticholotis bipunctata
- Sticholotis bisulcata
- Sticholotis brachyloba
- Sticholotis brahmaputrensis
- Sticholotis buruensis
- Sticholotis carinica
- Sticholotis cinctipennis
- Sticholotis clavata
- Sticholotis confucii
- Sticholotis cooloola
- Sticholotis crassa
- Sticholotis cribellata
- Sticholotis crux
- Sticholotis cuaraoensis
- Sticholotis culleni
- Sticholotis dadugangensis
- Sticholotis debyi
- Sticholotis decempunctata
- Sticholotis decora
- Sticholotis denticulata
- Sticholotis denticuligera
- Sticholotis dilatata
- Sticholotis discoidea
- Sticholotis dohrni
- Sticholotis dorsomaculata
- Sticholotis duodecimmaculata
- Sticholotis duodecimpunctata
- Sticholotis exsanguis
- Sticholotis ferruginea
- Sticholotis flammula
- Sticholotis flavicitri
- Sticholotis formosana
- Sticholotis gibbula
- Sticholotis globosa
- Sticholotis hilleri
- Sticholotis hirashimai
- Sticholotis hoabinhensis
- Sticholotis honesta
- Sticholotis horni
- Sticholotis humida
- Sticholotis illecebrosa
- Sticholotis jiangboi
- Sticholotis jinpingensis
- Sticholotis kabakovi
- Sticholotis klapperichi
- Sticholotis kraatzi
- Sticholotis kumatai
- Sticholotis laeta
- Sticholotis latissima
- Sticholotis linguiformis
- Sticholotis loebli
- Sticholotis maculata
- Sticholotis magnopunctata
- Sticholotis magnostriata
- Sticholotis maolanensis
- Sticholotis marginalis
- Sticholotis minuta
- Sticholotis morimotoi
- Sticholotis motuo
- Sticholotis nanlingensis
- Sticholotis neckiformis
- Sticholotis nepalensis
- Sticholotis nilgiriensis
- Sticholotis obesa
- Sticholotis obscurella
- Sticholotis obscurocincta
- Sticholotis octopunctata
- Sticholotis ovata
- Sticholotis partita
- Sticholotis pengi
- Sticholotis petila
- Sticholotis pictipennis
- Sticholotis pseudoferruginea
- Sticholotis punctata
- Sticholotis quadratimaculata
- Sticholotis quadriflavomaculata
- Sticholotis quadriguttata
- Sticholotis quadrillum
- Sticholotis quadrisignata
- Sticholotis redimita
- Sticholotis robusta
- Sticholotis ruficeps
- Sticholotis rufoplagiata
- Sticholotis rugicollis
- Sticholotis sanguinosa
- Sticholotis sansibarica
- Sticholotis sexpunctata
- Sticholotis simplifulva
- Sticholotis sonduongensis
- Sticholotis sublaevis
- Sticholotis substriata
- Sticholotis taenia
- Sticholotis taiwanensis
- Sticholotis tenuis
- Sticholotis testacea
- Sticholotis tortus
- Sticholotis tozer
- Sticholotis transversa
- Sticholotis tredecimmaculata
- Sticholotis tricolor
- Sticholotis undecimpunctata
- Sticholotis varia
- Sticholotis vietnamica
- Sticholotis wenchangia
- Sticholotis wuzhishana
- Sticholotis xiangtouensis
- Sticholotis zaitzevi
