= Sticholotis taenia =

Scientific classification
- Kingdom: Animalia
- Phylum: Arthropoda
- Clade: Pancrustacea
- Class: Insecta
- Order: Coleoptera
- Suborder: Polyphaga
- Infraorder: Cucujiformia
- Family: Coccinellidae
- Genus: Sticholotis
- Species: S. taenia

Binomial name
- Sticholotis taenia Wang & Ren, 2017

Species of beetle

Sticholotis taenia is a species of beetle of the family Coccinellidae. It is found in China (Yunnan).

== Description ==
Adults reach a length of about 2.7–2.9 mm (0.11–0.11 in). They have a shiny and glabrous body, but there are some short setae on the head. The head and pronotum are reddish brown, while the scutellum is dark brown. The elytra are reddish brown, with two yellow irregular discal spots, and each elytron also with eight black spots around the margins of the yellow. The underside is brown and the legs are reddish brown.

== Etymology ==
The species name is derived from Latin taenia and refers to the contorted penis apex.
