= Boschalis wagneri =

Scientific classification
- Kingdom: Animalia
- Phylum: Arthropoda
- Clade: Pancrustacea
- Class: Insecta
- Order: Coleoptera
- Suborder: Polyphaga
- Infraorder: Cucujiformia
- Family: Coccinellidae
- Genus: Boschalis
- Species: B. wagneri

Binomial name
- Boschalis wagneri Fürsch, 1995

Species of beetle

Boschalis wagneri is a species of beetle of the family Coccinellidae. It is found in Rwanda.

== Description ==
Adults reach a length of about 2.3–2.4 mm (0.091–0.094 in). The head is dark reddish-brown with short, white hairs. The pronotum is somewhat lighter reddish-brown. The elytra are colored like the pronotum, but slightly darker at the sides.
