= Neotina cariba =

Scientific classification
- Kingdom: Animalia
- Phylum: Arthropoda
- Clade: Pancrustacea
- Class: Insecta
- Order: Coleoptera
- Suborder: Polyphaga
- Infraorder: Cucujiformia
- Family: Coccinellidae
- Genus: Neotina
- Species: N. cariba

Binomial name
- Neotina cariba Gordon, 1977

Species of beetle

Neotina cariba is a species of beetle of the family Coccinellidae. It is found in Cuba.

== Description ==
Adults reach a length of about 1.60 mm. They have a piceous head with greenish tint, while the pronotum is piceous with a purplish tint. The elytron is reddish orange, while the lateral margin and apical one-third are dark with a purplish tint.

== Etymology ==
The species name is a Neo-Latin noun indicating the Caribbean origin of this species.
