= Sticholotis denticuligera =

Scientific classification
- Kingdom: Animalia
- Phylum: Arthropoda
- Clade: Pancrustacea
- Class: Insecta
- Order: Coleoptera
- Suborder: Polyphaga
- Infraorder: Cucujiformia
- Family: Coccinellidae
- Genus: Sticholotis
- Species: S. denticuligera

Binomial name
- Sticholotis denticuligera Wang & Ren, 2017

Species of beetle

Sticholotis denticuligera is a species of beetle of the family Coccinellidae. It is found in China (Yunnan).

== Description ==
Adults reach a length of about 2.24–2.51 mm (0.088–0.099 in). They have a shiny and glabrous body, but with some short setae on the head. The head is brown, with yellow mouthparts. The dorsal surface is reddish brown and the ventral surface is dark reddish brown with yellowish brown legs.

== Etymology ==
The species name is derived from Latin denticuligera and refers to the penis apex with several denticles.
