= Jauravia assamensis =

Scientific classification
- Kingdom: Animalia
- Phylum: Arthropoda
- Clade: Pancrustacea
- Class: Insecta
- Order: Coleoptera
- Suborder: Polyphaga
- Infraorder: Cucujiformia
- Family: Coccinellidae
- Genus: Jauravia
- Species: J. assamensis

Binomial name
- Jauravia assamensis Kapur, 1963

Species of beetle

Jauravia assamensis is a species of beetle of the family Coccinellidae. It is found in India (Assam).

== Description ==
Adults reach a length of about 2.25–2.32 mm (0.089–0.091 in). The upper surface is testaceous to pale testaceous, except for the greyish to black eyes and an elongate, rather kidney-shaped, black marking on each elytron.
