= Sticholotis tenuis =

Scientific classification
- Kingdom: Animalia
- Phylum: Arthropoda
- Clade: Pancrustacea
- Class: Insecta
- Order: Coleoptera
- Suborder: Polyphaga
- Infraorder: Cucujiformia
- Family: Coccinellidae
- Genus: Sticholotis
- Species: S. tenuis

Binomial name
- Sticholotis tenuis Wang & Ren, 2017

Species of beetle

Sticholotis tenuis is a species of beetle of the family Coccinellidae. It is found in China (Guizhou).

== Description ==
Adults reach a length of about 2.08 mm (0.082 in). They have a shiny and glabrous body, but the head has some short setae. The head is yellowish brown, with yellow mouthparts. The pronotum is yellowish brown and the scutellum is dark brown. The elytra are yellowish brown, each elytron with four black spots. The underside is brown and the legs are yellow.

== Etymology ==
The species name is derived from Latin tenuis (meaning thin, slender) and refers to the thin and long penis.
