= Jauravia punjabensis =

Scientific classification
- Kingdom: Animalia
- Phylum: Arthropoda
- Clade: Pancrustacea
- Class: Insecta
- Order: Coleoptera
- Suborder: Polyphaga
- Infraorder: Cucujiformia
- Family: Coccinellidae
- Genus: Jauravia
- Species: J. punjabensis

Binomial name
- Jauravia punjabensis Singh & Singh, 2012

Species of beetle

Jauravia punjabensis is a species of beetle of the family Coccinellidae. It is found in India (Punjab).

== Description ==
Adults reach a length of about 2.45 mm (0.096 in). The head, pronotum and scutellum are reddish brown, while the eyes are black. The elytra are testaceous, each with four black spots. The underside is yellowish brown.
