= Chilocorellus =

Scientific classification
- Kingdom: Animalia
- Phylum: Arthropoda
- Clade: Pancrustacea
- Class: Insecta
- Order: Coleoptera
- Suborder: Polyphaga
- Infraorder: Cucujiformia
- Family: Coccinellidae
- Subfamily: Coccinellinae
- Tribe: Sticholotidini
- Genus: Chilocorellus; Miyatake, 1994

Genus of beetles

Boschalis is a genus of beetles belonging to the family Coccinellidae.

== Species ==
- Chilocorellus denspinulifer
- Chilocorellus fistulachaetodontus
- Chilocorellus luzonicus
- Chilocorellus protuberans
- Chilocorellus quadrimaculatus
- Chilocorellus seleuyensis
- Chilocorellus tenuous
- Chilocorellus uncinacanthus
