= Sticholotis maculata =

Scientific classification
- Kingdom: Animalia
- Phylum: Arthropoda
- Clade: Pancrustacea
- Class: Insecta
- Order: Coleoptera
- Suborder: Polyphaga
- Infraorder: Cucujiformia
- Family: Coccinellidae
- Genus: Sticholotis
- Species: S. maculata

Binomial name
- Sticholotis maculata Korschefsky, 1944

Species of beetle

Sticholotis maculata is a species of beetle of the family Coccinellidae. It is found in Taiwan.

== Description ==
Adults may be distinguished from other Sticholotis species by the elytral pattern consisting of three small black spots, with additional black streaks on the lateral or sutural margins.
