= Sticholotis neckiformis =

Scientific classification
- Kingdom: Animalia
- Phylum: Arthropoda
- Clade: Pancrustacea
- Class: Insecta
- Order: Coleoptera
- Suborder: Polyphaga
- Infraorder: Cucujiformia
- Family: Coccinellidae
- Genus: Sticholotis
- Species: S. neckiformis

Binomial name
- Sticholotis neckiformis Wang & Ren, 2017

Species of beetle

Sticholotis neckiformis is a species of beetle of the family Coccinellidae. It is found in China (Yunnan).

== Description ==
Adults reach a length of about 2.93–3.13 mm (0.115–0.123 in). They have a shiny and glabrous body, but there are some short setae on the head. The head and pronotum are yellow and the scutellum is yellowish brown. The elytra are yellow, each elytron with six black spots. The underside and legs are yellow.

== Etymology ==
The species name is derived from Latin neck and form and refers to the neck-form apex of the penis guide.
