= Sticholotis dilatata =

Scientific classification
- Kingdom: Animalia
- Phylum: Arthropoda
- Clade: Pancrustacea
- Class: Insecta
- Order: Coleoptera
- Suborder: Polyphaga
- Infraorder: Cucujiformia
- Family: Coccinellidae
- Genus: Sticholotis
- Species: S. dilatata

Binomial name
- Sticholotis dilatata Wang & Ren, 2017

Species of beetle

Sticholotis dilatata is a species of beetle of the family Coccinellidae. It is found in China (Yunnan).

== Description ==
Adults reach a length of about 2.34 mm (0.092 in). They have a shiny and glabrous body, but the head has some short setae. The head, pronotum and scutellum are reddish brown, while the elytra are red, with a black band along the basal and lateral margins and each elytron with two black rounded spots. The underside is reddish brown and the legs are yellowish brown.

== Etymology ==
The species name is derived from Latin dilatatus and refers to the dilated parameres.
