= Nelasa beckeri =

Scientific classification
- Kingdom: Animalia
- Phylum: Arthropoda
- Clade: Pancrustacea
- Class: Insecta
- Order: Coleoptera
- Suborder: Polyphaga
- Infraorder: Cucujiformia
- Family: Coccinellidae
- Genus: Nelasa
- Species: N. beckeri

Binomial name
- Nelasa beckeri Gordon, 1991

Species of beetle

Nelasa beckeri is a species of beetle of the family Coccinellidae. It is found in Jamaica.

== Description ==
Adults reach a length of about 1.6-1.8 mm. Adults are black with a green metallic sheen.

== Etymology ==
The species is named for Ed Becker, oneof the collectors of the type series.
