= Parinesa whiteheadi =

Scientific classification
- Kingdom: Animalia
- Phylum: Arthropoda
- Clade: Pancrustacea
- Class: Insecta
- Order: Coleoptera
- Suborder: Polyphaga
- Infraorder: Cucujiformia
- Family: Coccinellidae
- Genus: Parinesa
- Species: P. whiteheadi

Binomial name
- Parinesa whiteheadi Gordon, 1991

Species of beetle

Parinesa whiteheadi is a species of beetle of the family Coccinellidae. It is found in the Dominican Republic.

== Description ==
Adults reach a length of about 1.25 mm. The elytron is black with a faint metallic blue sheen and the head and pronotum are dark brown.

== Etymology ==
The species is named for a friend of the author, Donald R. Whitehead.
