= Sticholotis pengi =

Scientific classification
- Kingdom: Animalia
- Phylum: Arthropoda
- Clade: Pancrustacea
- Class: Insecta
- Order: Coleoptera
- Suborder: Polyphaga
- Infraorder: Cucujiformia
- Family: Coccinellidae
- Genus: Sticholotis
- Species: S. pengi

Binomial name
- Sticholotis pengi Wang & Ren, 2017

Species of beetle

Sticholotis pengi is a species of beetle of the family Coccinellidae. It is found in China (Hainan).

== Description ==
Adults reach a length of about 2.67–2.97 mm (0.105–0.117 in). They have a shiny and glabrous body, but the head has some short setae. The head is reddish brown, with yellowish brown mouthparts and antennae. The pronotum is reddish brown and the scutellum is dark brown. The elytra are yellowish brown, with a reddish band along the lateral margin, and each elytron with six black spots. The underside and legs are reddish brown.

== Etymology ==
The species is named in honour of Prof. Peng Zhengqiang, who collected large numbers of ladybird specimens from Hainan.
