= Nesina amazonia =

Scientific classification
- Kingdom: Animalia
- Phylum: Arthropoda
- Clade: Pancrustacea
- Class: Insecta
- Order: Coleoptera
- Suborder: Polyphaga
- Infraorder: Cucujiformia
- Family: Coccinellidae
- Genus: Nesina
- Species: N. amazonia

Binomial name
- Nesina amazonia Gordon, 1977

Species of beetle

Nesina amazonia is a species of beetle of the family Coccinellidae. It is found in Brazil.

== Description ==
Adults reach a length of about 1.30 mm. Adults are black, while the elytrum is dark piceous.

== Etymology ==
The species name is a Latin adjective referring the locality of origin.
