= Boschalis =

Scientific classification
- Kingdom: Animalia
- Phylum: Arthropoda
- Clade: Pancrustacea
- Class: Insecta
- Order: Coleoptera
- Suborder: Polyphaga
- Infraorder: Cucujiformia
- Family: Coccinellidae
- Subfamily: Coccinellinae
- Tribe: Sticholotidini
- Genus: Boschalis; Weise, 1897

Genus of beetles

Boschalis is a genus of beetles belonging to the family Coccinellidae.

== Species ==
- Boschalis bremeri
- Boschalis denticulata
- Boschalis hamatosiphonata
- Boschalis kamerunensis
- Boschalis karisimbica
- Boschalis kenyensis
- Boschalis marginalis
- Boschalis nigra
- Boschalis nigripes
- Boschalis podagrica
- Boschalis usambarica
- Boschalis wagneri
