= Nelasa haitiensis =

Scientific classification
- Kingdom: Animalia
- Phylum: Arthropoda
- Clade: Pancrustacea
- Class: Insecta
- Order: Coleoptera
- Suborder: Polyphaga
- Infraorder: Cucujiformia
- Family: Coccinellidae
- Genus: Nelasa
- Species: N. haitiensis

Binomial name
- Nelasa haitiensis Gordon, 1991

Species of beetle

Nelasa haitiensis is a species of beetle of the family Coccinellidae. It is found in Haiti.

== Description ==
Adults reach a length of about 1.6 mm. Adults are black with a faint coppery sheen on the head and pronotum, the elytron however, has a metallic green sheen.

== Etymology ==
The species is named for the country of origin.
