= Nexophallus =

Scientific classification
- Kingdom: Animalia
- Phylum: Arthropoda
- Clade: Pancrustacea
- Class: Insecta
- Order: Coleoptera
- Suborder: Polyphaga
- Infraorder: Cucujiformia
- Family: Coccinellidae
- Tribe: Sticholotidini
- Genus: Nexophallus; Gordon, 1969

Genus of beetles

Nexophallus is a genus of lady beetles in the family Coccinellidae.

== Species ==
- Nexophallus lindemanni Gordon, 1977
- Nexophallus panamensis González & Větrovec, 2021
- Nexophallus popei Gordon, 1982
- Nexophallus rufoglobus Gordon, 1969
- Nexophallus semiglobus Gordon, 1969
