= Jauravia kapuri =

Scientific classification
- Kingdom: Animalia
- Phylum: Arthropoda
- Clade: Pancrustacea
- Class: Insecta
- Order: Coleoptera
- Suborder: Polyphaga
- Infraorder: Cucujiformia
- Family: Coccinellidae
- Genus: Jauravia
- Species: J. kapuri

Binomial name
- Jauravia kapuri Iablokoff-Khnzorian, 1972

Species of beetle

Jauravia kapuri is a species of beetle of the family Coccinellidae. It is found in Sri Lanka.
