= Sticholotis tortus =

Scientific classification
- Kingdom: Animalia
- Phylum: Arthropoda
- Clade: Pancrustacea
- Class: Insecta
- Order: Coleoptera
- Suborder: Polyphaga
- Infraorder: Cucujiformia
- Family: Coccinellidae
- Genus: Sticholotis
- Species: S. tortus

Binomial name
- Sticholotis tortus Wang & Ren, 2017

Species of beetle

Sticholotis tortus is a species of beetle of the family Coccinellidae. It is found in China (Yunnan).

== Description ==
Adults reach a length of about 2.11–2.47 mm (0.083–0.097 in). They have a shiny and glabrous body, but the head is densely covered with short setae. The head is yellowish brown and the elytra are yellowish brown with a reddish brown band along the lateral margins, and with six black spots. The underside is reddish brown and the legs are yellowish.

== Etymology ==
The species name is derived from Latin tortus and refers to the contorted penis apex.
