= Sticholotis illecebrosa =

Scientific classification
- Kingdom: Animalia
- Phylum: Arthropoda
- Clade: Pancrustacea
- Class: Insecta
- Order: Coleoptera
- Suborder: Polyphaga
- Infraorder: Cucujiformia
- Family: Coccinellidae
- Genus: Sticholotis
- Species: S. illecebrosa

Binomial name
- Sticholotis illecebrosa Wang & Ren, 2017

Species of beetle

Sticholotis illecebrosa is a species of beetle of the family Coccinellidae. It is found in China (Guizhou).

== Description ==
Adults reach a length of about 2.24 mm (0.088 in). They have a shiny and glabrous body, but the head has some short setae. The head is yellow and the pronotum is yellow with a black central spot. The scutellum is yellowish brown and the elytra are yellow with a brown band along the basal and lateral margins, and each elytron with four black spots. The underside is yellow.

== Etymology ==
The species name is derived from Latin illecebrosus and refers to its beautiful appearance.
