= Boschalis denticulata =

Scientific classification
- Kingdom: Animalia
- Phylum: Arthropoda
- Clade: Pancrustacea
- Class: Insecta
- Order: Coleoptera
- Suborder: Polyphaga
- Infraorder: Cucujiformia
- Family: Coccinellidae
- Genus: Boschalis
- Species: B. denticulata

Binomial name
- Boschalis denticulata Fürsch, 1995

Species of beetle

Boschalis denticulata is a species of beetle of the family Coccinellidae. It is found in Tanzania.

== Description ==
Adults reach a length of about 2.6 mm (0.10 in). The head and pronotum are black. The elytra are black, with an elongated oval red spot in the center. The underside is black.

== Etymology ==
The species name is derived from Latin denticulus (meaning weakly toothed) and refers to the tibial teeth.
