= Boschalis kenyensis =

Scientific classification
- Kingdom: Animalia
- Phylum: Arthropoda
- Clade: Pancrustacea
- Class: Insecta
- Order: Coleoptera
- Suborder: Polyphaga
- Infraorder: Cucujiformia
- Family: Coccinellidae
- Genus: Boschalis
- Species: B. kenyensis

Binomial name
- Boschalis kenyensis Fürsch, 2001

Species of beetle

Boschalis kenyensis is a species of beetle of the family Coccinellidae. It is found in Kenya.
