= Nelasa schwarzi =

Scientific classification
- Kingdom: Animalia
- Phylum: Arthropoda
- Clade: Pancrustacea
- Class: Insecta
- Order: Coleoptera
- Suborder: Polyphaga
- Infraorder: Cucujiformia
- Family: Coccinellidae
- Genus: Nelasa
- Species: N. schwarzi

Binomial name
- Nelasa schwarzi Gordon, 1991

Species of beetle

Nelasa schwarzi is a species of beetle of the family Coccinellidae. It is found in Cuba.

== Description ==
Adults reach a length of about 1.4 mm. Adults are black with a purple sheen.

== Etymology ==
The species is named for E. A. Schwarz, the collector of the holotype.
