= Sticholotis bilineata =

Scientific classification
- Kingdom: Animalia
- Phylum: Arthropoda
- Clade: Pancrustacea
- Class: Insecta
- Order: Coleoptera
- Suborder: Polyphaga
- Infraorder: Cucujiformia
- Family: Coccinellidae
- Genus: Sticholotis
- Species: S. bilineata

Binomial name
- Sticholotis bilineata Weise, 1910

Species of beetle

Sticholotis bilineata is a species of beetle of the family Coccinellidae. It is found in China and India (Sikkim).

== Description ==
Each elytron has a large elongate macula and four rows of large punctures.
