= Sticholotis nanlingensis =

Scientific classification
- Kingdom: Animalia
- Phylum: Arthropoda
- Clade: Pancrustacea
- Class: Insecta
- Order: Coleoptera
- Suborder: Polyphaga
- Infraorder: Cucujiformia
- Family: Coccinellidae
- Genus: Sticholotis
- Species: S. nanlingensis

Binomial name
- Sticholotis nanlingensis Wang & Ren, 2017

Species of beetle

Sticholotis nanlingensis is a species of beetle of the family Coccinellidae. It is found in China (Guangdong).

== Description ==
Adults reach a length of about 2.44 mm (0.096 in). They have a shiny and glabrous body, but the head has some short setae. The head and pronotum are brown, while the scutellum is dark brown. The elytra are reddish brown, with a brown band along the lateral margin, and each elytron with six black spots. The underside is dark brown and the legs are yellowish brown.

== Etymology ==
The species is named after the Nanling National Natural Reserve, its type locality.
