= Sticholotis formosana =

Scientific classification
- Kingdom: Animalia
- Phylum: Arthropoda
- Clade: Pancrustacea
- Class: Insecta
- Order: Coleoptera
- Suborder: Polyphaga
- Infraorder: Cucujiformia
- Family: Coccinellidae
- Genus: Sticholotis
- Species: S. formosana

Binomial name
- Sticholotis formosana Weise, 1923

Species of beetle

Sticholotis formosana is a species of beetle of the family Coccinellidae. It is found in Taiwan and China (Guangdong, Hainan).

== Description ==
Adults reach a length of about 2.24–2.87 mm (0.088–0.113 in). They have a shiny and glabrous body. The head is dark red, with yellowish brown mouthparts. The pronotum is red and the scutellum is black. The elytra are dark brown to black, with reddish brown lateral margins and each elytron with two dark red spots.
