= Glomerella perconvexa =

Scientific classification
- Kingdom: Animalia
- Phylum: Arthropoda
- Clade: Pancrustacea
- Class: Insecta
- Order: Coleoptera
- Suborder: Polyphaga
- Infraorder: Cucujiformia
- Family: Coccinellidae
- Subfamily: Coccinellinae
- Tribe: Sticholotidini
- Genus: Glomerella; Gordon, 1977
- Species: G. perconvexa

Binomial name
- Glomerella perconvexa Gordon, 1977

Species of beetle

Glomerella perconvexa is a species of beetle of the family Coccinellidae. It is the only species in the genus Glomerella. It is found in Brazil.

== Description ==
Adults reach a length of about 1.50 mm. Adults are nearly black, with the pronotum and most of the head dark reddish piceous.

== Etymology ==
The species name is a Latin adjective meaning extremely convex.
