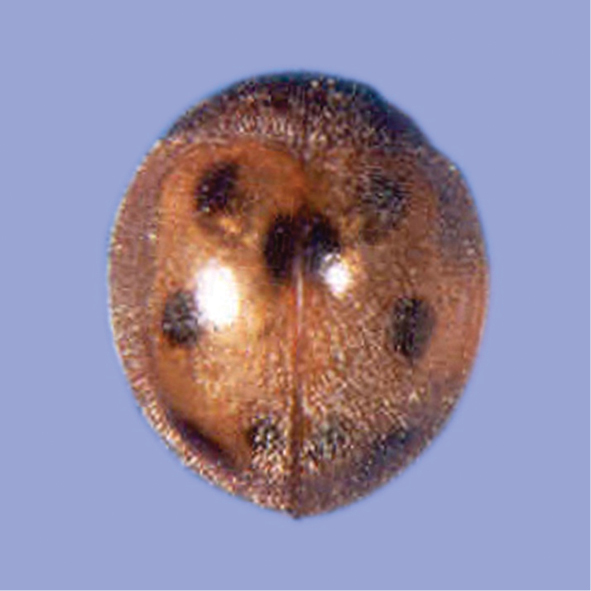
- Pharoscymnus flexibilis

Scientific classification
- Kingdom: Animalia
- Phylum: Arthropoda
- Clade: Pancrustacea
- Class: Insecta
- Order: Coleoptera
- Suborder: Polyphaga
- Infraorder: Cucujiformia
- Family: Coccinellidae
- Subfamily: Coccinellinae
- Tribe: Sticholotidini; Weise, 1901

Genera
- See text

= Sticholotidini =

Tribe of beetles

Sticholotidini is a beetle tribe in the subfamily Coccinellinae of the family Coccinellidae (ladybirds).

== Genera ==
- Boschalis
- Bucolellus
- Bura
- Chaetolotis
- Chilocorellus
- Coelolotis
- Coelopterus
- Filipinolotis
- Glomerella
- Habrolotis
- Hemipharus
- Jauravia
- Lenasa
- Lotis
- Mimoserangium
- Neaptera
- Nelasa
- Neojauravia
- Neotina
- Nesina
- Nesolotis
- Nexophallus
- Paracoelopterus
- Parajauravia
- Paranelasa
- Paranesolotis
- Parinesa
- Pharopsis
- Pharoscymnus
- Phlyctenolotis
- Semiviride
- Sticholotis
- Stictobura
- Sulcolotis
- Synonychimorpha
- Trimallena
- Xamerpillus
- Xanthorcus
- Xestolotis
