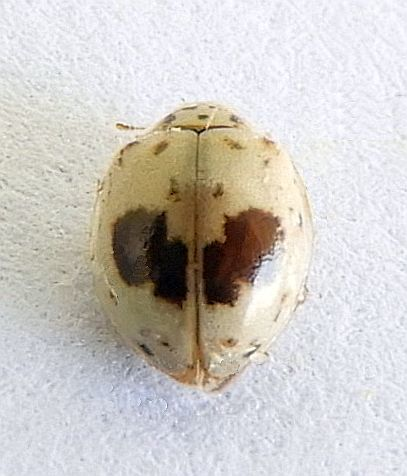

Scientific classification
- Kingdom: Animalia
- Phylum: Arthropoda
- Clade: Pancrustacea
- Class: Insecta
- Order: Coleoptera
- Suborder: Polyphaga
- Infraorder: Cucujiformia
- Family: Coccinellidae
- Genus: Psyllobora
- Species: P. plagiata

Binomial name
- Psyllobora plagiata Schaeffer, 1908

Synonyms
- Psyllobora koebelei Nunenmacher, 1911

= Psyllobora plagiata =

Species of beetle

Psyllobora plagiata is a species of lady beetle in the family Coccinellidae. It is found in North America, where it has been recorded from Arizona.

== Description ==
Adults reach a length of about 2.50-3.10 mm. Adults are similar to Psyllobora vigintimaculata, but the markings on the elytron are much smaller.
