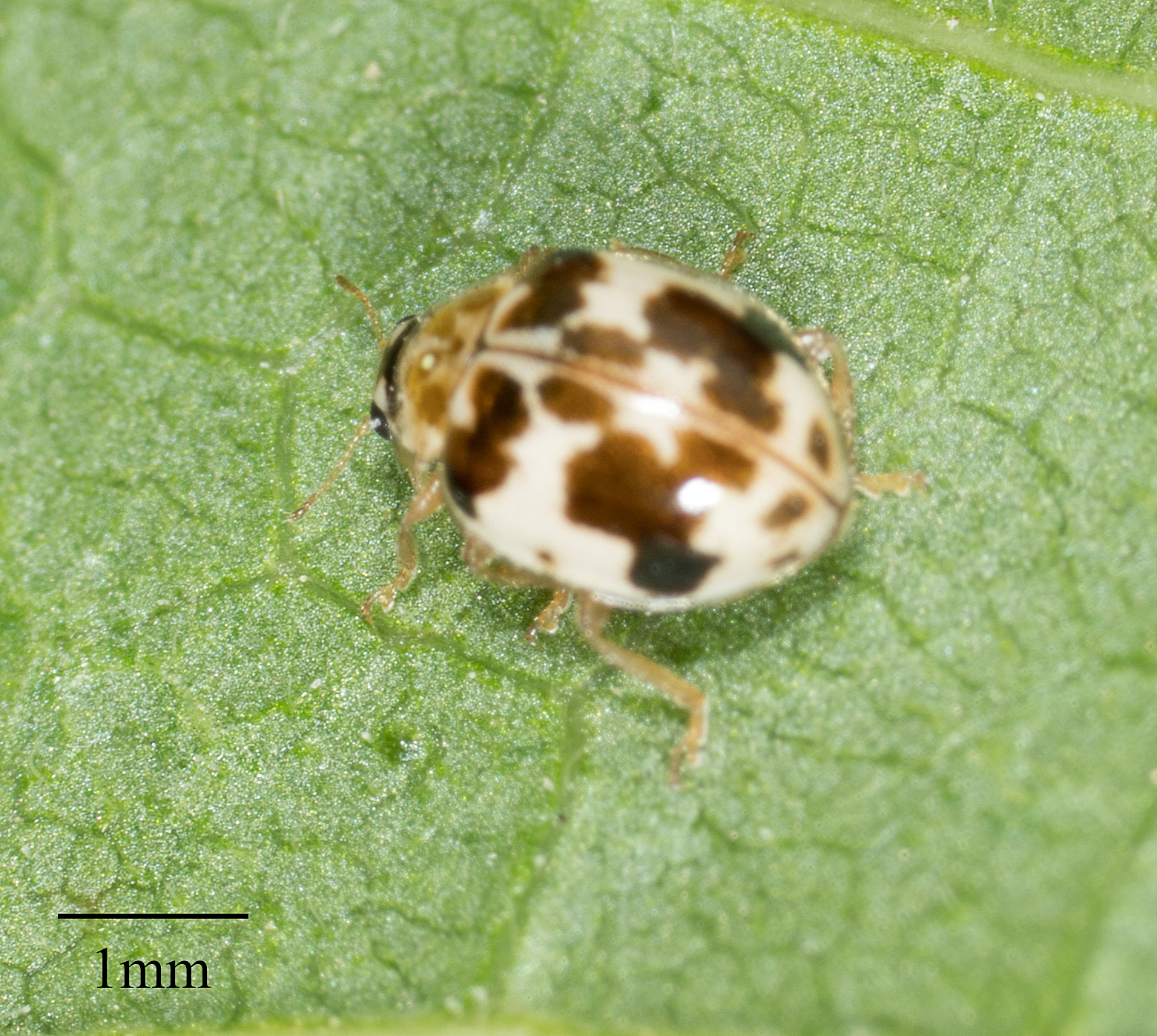

Scientific classification
- Kingdom: Animalia
- Phylum: Arthropoda
- Clade: Pancrustacea
- Class: Insecta
- Order: Coleoptera
- Suborder: Polyphaga
- Infraorder: Cucujiformia
- Family: Coccinellidae
- Genus: Psyllobora
- Species: P. borealis

Binomial name
- Psyllobora borealis Casey, 1899

Synonyms
- Psyllobora deficiens Casey, 1899

= Psyllobora borealis =

Species of beetle

Psyllobora borealis is a species of lady beetle in the family Coccinellidae and the genus Psyllobora. It is found in North America, where it has been recorded from Montana to New Mexico, west to southern British Columbia and southern California.

== Description ==
Adults reach a length of about 2.4 to 3.1 mm in length. Its appearance consists of dark splotches on the elytra with lighter splotches on the pronotum.

A distinction from Psyllobora vigintimaculata is that the lateral spot in P. borealis is much smaller and always separate from its median spot.

== Biology ==
Its main food source is Powdery Mildew
