= Zip code (disambiguation) =

A ZIP Code is a numeric postal code used in the US and its territories.

Zip code may also refer to:

- ZIP codes in the Philippines
- Zip Code (tour), the 2015 Rollings Stones tour
- Zipcode (album), the 22-Pistepirkko album
