= Noita =

Noita is the Finnish word for witch and may refer to:

- Noita (album), a 2015 album by Korpiklaani
- Noita (video game), a 2020 action-adventure game by Nolla Games
- "Noita", a song by 22-Pistepirkko from their 1984 album Piano, rumpu ja kukka
- "Noita", a song by Indica from their 2007 album Kadonnut puutarha
- Noita palaa elämään (English: The Witch), a 1952 Finnish horror film
