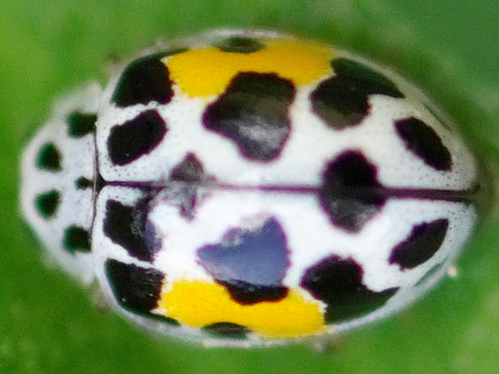

Scientific classification
- Kingdom: Animalia
- Phylum: Arthropoda
- Clade: Pancrustacea
- Class: Insecta
- Order: Coleoptera
- Suborder: Polyphaga
- Infraorder: Cucujiformia
- Family: Coccinellidae
- Genus: Psyllobora
- Species: P. nana

Binomial name
- Psyllobora nana Mulsant, 1850

= Psyllobora nana =

Species of beetle

Psyllobora nana is a species of lady beetle in the family Coccinellidae and the genus Psyllobora. It is found in the Caribbean (Cuba) and North America (Florida). They have been found as far north as Norfolk, VA.

== Description ==
Adults reach a length of about 2.30-2.70 mm. The colour pattern of the adults is similar to that of Psyllobora vigintimaculata, but the spots on the elytron are less coalescent.
