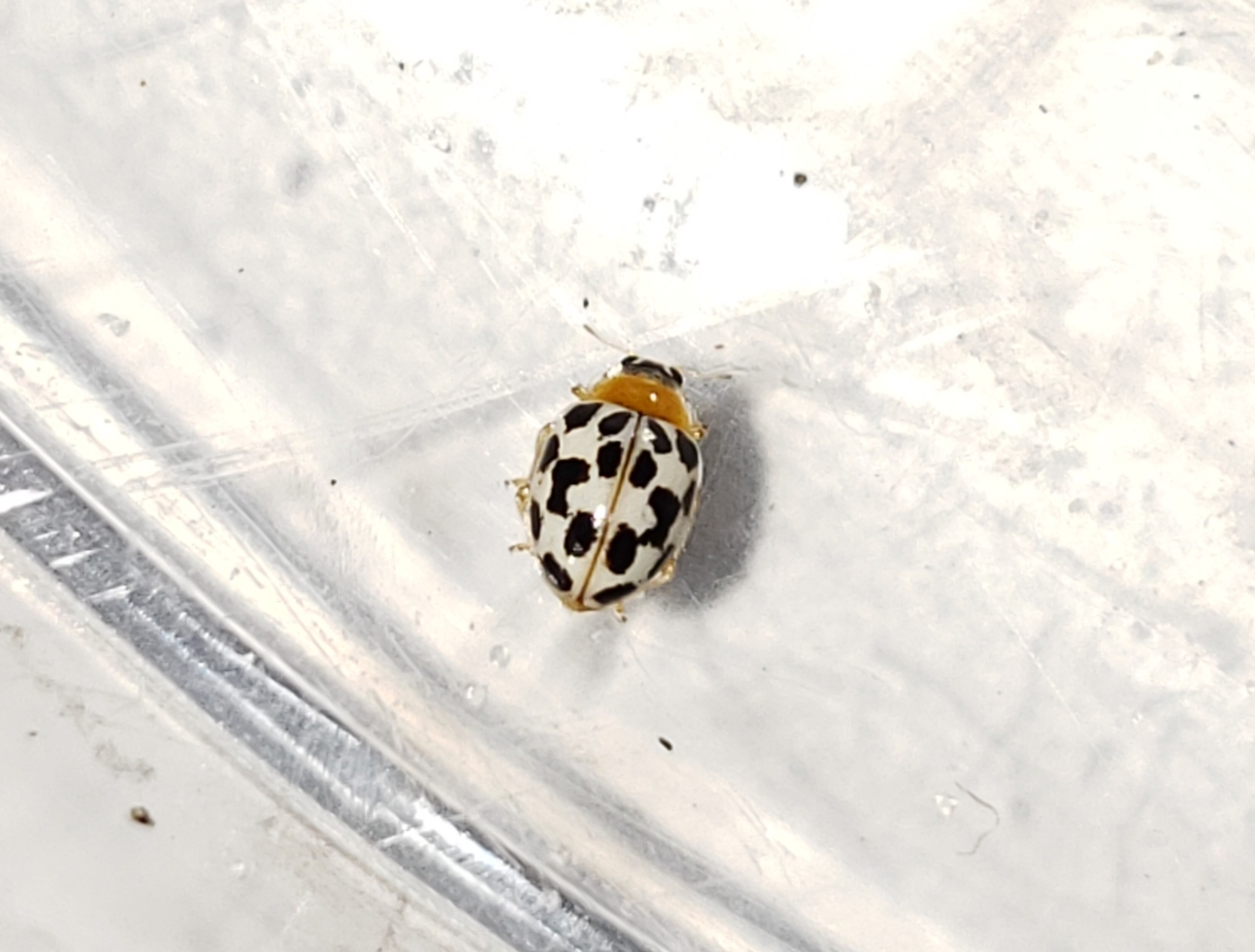

Scientific classification
- Kingdom: Animalia
- Phylum: Arthropoda
- Clade: Pancrustacea
- Class: Insecta
- Order: Coleoptera
- Suborder: Polyphaga
- Infraorder: Cucujiformia
- Family: Coccinellidae
- Genus: Psyllobora
- Species: P. parvinotata

Binomial name
- Psyllobora parvinotata Casey, 1899

Synonyms
- Psyllobora vigintimaculata var. pallidicola Blatchley, 1914

= Psyllobora parvinotata =

Species of beetle

Psyllobora parvinotata is a species of lady beetle in the family Coccinellidae. It is found in North America, where it has been recorded from Florida to Louisiana.

== Description ==
Adults reach a length of about 2.75-3.40 mm. The colour pattern of the adults is similar to that of Psyllobora vigintimaculata, but the pronotum often has no spots or pale spots. Also, the spots on the elytron are paler.
