= Downhill City =

Soundtrack album by 22-Pistepirkko
- Released: 1999
- Language: English
- Label: Clearspot

22-Pistepirkko chronology
Eleven (1998)	Downhill City (1999)	Rally of Love (2001)

Downhill City is an album by 22-Pistepirkko. It was released in 1999 and contains the original soundtrack for the motion picture Downhill City by the Finnish director Hannu Salonen.

== Track listing ==
1. "Fabian's Theme"
2. "Downhill City"
3. "Fujisan"
4. "Say Wrong"
5. "Let The Romeo Weep" (Flamenco Mix)
6. "Snowy Dave -99"
7. "Doris Drives Away"
8. "Sascha's Theme"
9. "Where's The Home, Joey?"
10. "Coffee Girl 2"
11. "Truth"
12. "Fujisan (Beatbox Jam)"
13. "Roundabout 2"
14. "Tokyo Tiger" (Aleksei Borisov Remix)

== Personnel ==
- Andy McCoy - guitar
- 22-Pistepirkko - programming, mixing, producing, engineering
