= Eleven (22-Pistepirkko album) =

Studio album by 22-Pistepirkko
- Released: 1998

22-Pistepirkko chronology
Zipcode (1996)	Eleven (1998)	Downhill City (1999)

Eleven (also known as Ele∀en) is a music album by the Finnish band 22-Pistepirkko. It was released in 1998.

Professional ratings
Review scores
Source	Rating
LA Weekly	(positive)

== Track listing ==
1. "Taxi 74"
2. "Onion Soup"
3. "Coma Moon"
4. "Sad Lake City"
5. "Boardroom Walk"
6. "Hey Man"
7. "Let the Romeo Weep"
8. "Beautiful Morning"
9. "Frustration"
10. "Shadow"

Music videos were made for "Onion Soup" and "Boardroom Walk".
