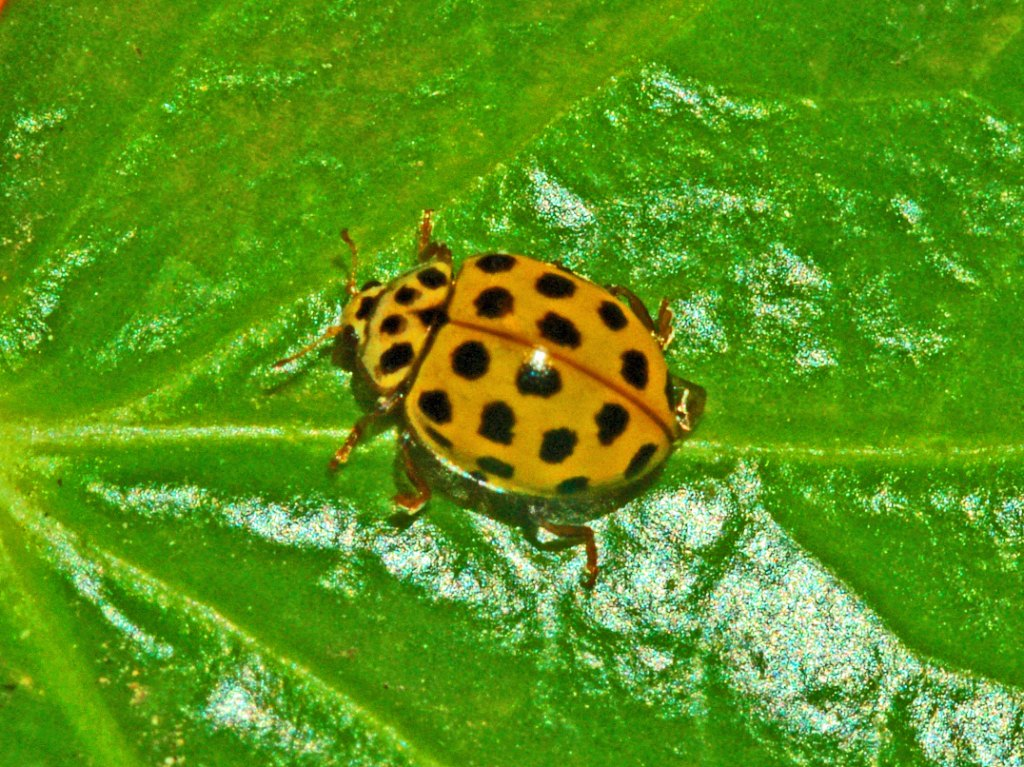
- Psyllobora vigintiduopunctata

Scientific classification
- Kingdom: Animalia
- Phylum: Arthropoda
- Clade: Pancrustacea
- Class: Insecta
- Order: Coleoptera
- Suborder: Polyphaga
- Infraorder: Cucujiformia
- Family: Coccinellidae
- Tribe: Coccinellini
- Genus: Psyllobora; Chevrolat in Dejean, 1837

Synonyms
- Thea Mulsant, 1846

= Psyllobora =

Genus of beetles

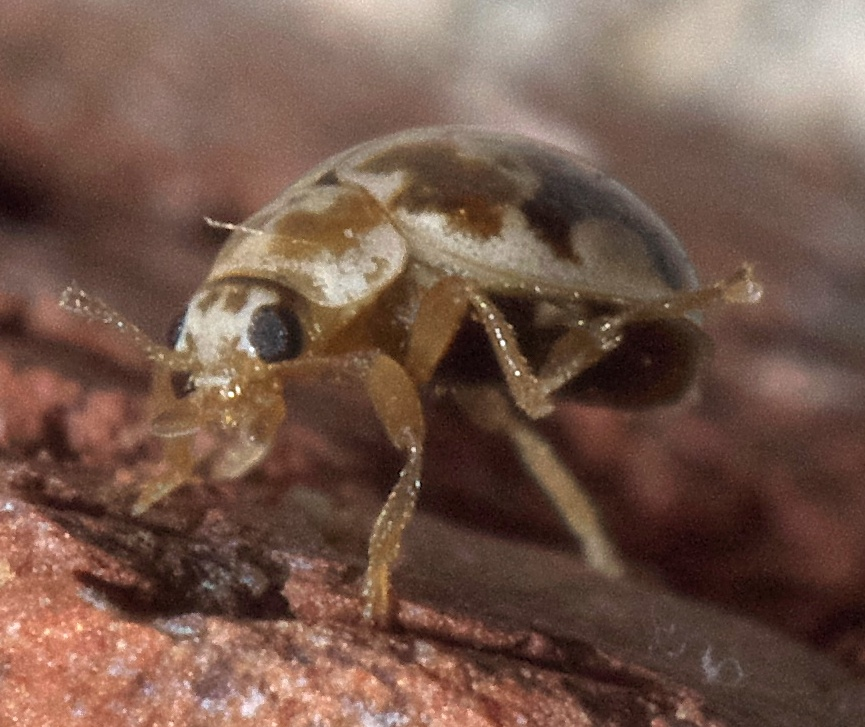
Psyllobora renifer

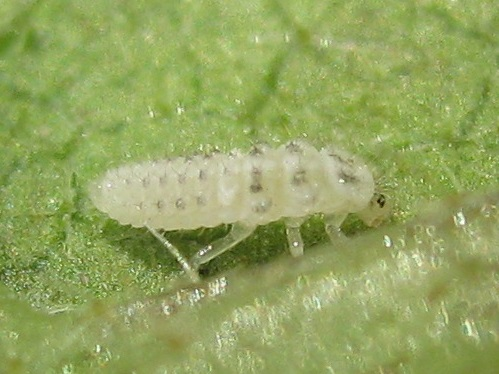
P. vigintimaculata, larva

Psyllobora is a genus of fungus-eating lady beetles in the family Coccinellidae.

== Species ==
These species belong to the genus Psyllobora:

- Psyllobora amazonensis
- Psyllobora approximata
- Psyllobora bakewelli
- Psyllobora balinti
- Psyllobora batesi
- Psyllobora bicongregata
- Psyllobora bisigma
- Psyllobora bisoctonotata (Mulsant, 1850)
- Psyllobora bisquadripunctata
- Psyllobora blanda
- Psyllobora boliviana
- Psyllobora borealis Casey, 1899^{i c g b}
- Psyllobora borgmeiri
- Psyllobora bowringi Crotch, 1874^{g}
- Psyllobora calida
- Psyllobora camargoi
- Psyllobora championi
- Psyllobora configurans
- Psyllobora confluens Fabricius, 1801^{g}
- Psyllobora confusa
- Psyllobora consita
- Psyllobora consitoides
- Psyllobora consobrina
- Psyllobora conspurcata Boheman, 1859^{i c g}
- Psyllobora constantini
- Psyllobora costae Mulsant, 1853^{g}
- Psyllobora decipiens
- Psyllobora delicata
- Psyllobora dissimilis
- Psyllobora distinguenda
- Psyllobora divisa
- Psyllobora drakei
- Psyllobora egae
- Psyllobora emaciata
- Psyllobora epistictica
- Psyllobora equatoriana
- Psyllobora evanescens
- Psyllobora foliacea
- Psyllobora germari
- Psyllobora gloriosa
- Psyllobora gorhami
- Psyllobora graphica
- Psyllobora gratiosa
- Psyllobora hathawayi
- Psyllobora huancayensis
- Psyllobora hybrida
- Psyllobora imbecilla
- Psyllobora impollutipenna
- Psyllobora intricata Mulsant, 1850^{g}
- Psyllobora jalapaiensis
- Psyllobora juvenca
- Psyllobora kirschi
- Psyllobora lacteola
- Psyllobora lata
- Psyllobora lenta
- Psyllobora liliputiana
- Psyllobora lineola Fabricius, 1792^{g}
- Psyllobora luctuosa
- Psyllobora lueri
- Psyllobora lutescens
- Psyllobora machatschkei
- Psyllobora marginenotata
- Psyllobora marshalli Crotch, 1874^{g}
- Psyllobora meticulosa
- Psyllobora mocquerysii
- Psyllobora moniqueae
- Psyllobora nana Mulsant, 1850^{i c g b}
- Psyllobora nigrovittata
- Psyllobora octodecimmaculata
- Psyllobora octopunctata
- Psyllobora oxygnatha
- Psyllobora parenthesis
- Psyllobora parvinotata Casey, 1899^{i c g b}
- Psyllobora pauline
- Psyllobora peruana
- Psyllobora picta
- Psyllobora picturata
- Psyllobora plagiata Schaeffer, 1908^{i c g b}
- Psyllobora plaumanni
- Psyllobora punctella
- Psyllobora pura
- Psyllobora renifer Casey, 1899^{i c g b}
- Psyllobora roei
- Psyllobora rufosignata
- Psyllobora schwarzi Chapin, 1957^{b}
- Psyllobora sicardi
- Psyllobora sosia
- Psyllobora subsimilis
- Psyllobora veraecrucis
- Psyllobora vigintiduopunctata (Linnaeus, 1758)^{g b} (22-spotted lady beetle)
- Psyllobora vigintimaculata (Say, 1824)^{i c g b} (twenty-spotted lady beetle)
- Psyllobora vittata

Data sources: i = ITIS, c = Catalogue of Life, g = GBIF, b = Bugguide.net
