= The Kings of Hong Kong =

Studio album by 22-Pistepirkko
- Released: 1987
- Label: Pygmi
- Producer: Riku Mattila

22-Pistepirkko chronology
Piano, rumpu ja kukka (1984)	The Kings of Hong Kong (1987)	Bare Bone Nest (1990)

Professional ratings
Review scores
Source	Rating
Allmusic	3/5 stars

The Kings of Hong Kong is the second album by 22-Pistepirkko. It was released in 1987 (see 1987 in music).

== Track listing ==
1. "I'm Back"
2. "Geronimo"
3. "Last Night"
4. "Big Bed"
5. "Hong Kong King"
6. "Hank's TV Set"
7. "Don't Try to Tease Me"
8. "I'm Staying Now"
9. "Lost Lost Love"
10. "B-Instrumental"
11. "Motorcycle Man"
12. "Searching & Looking"
13. "Horseman's Son"
