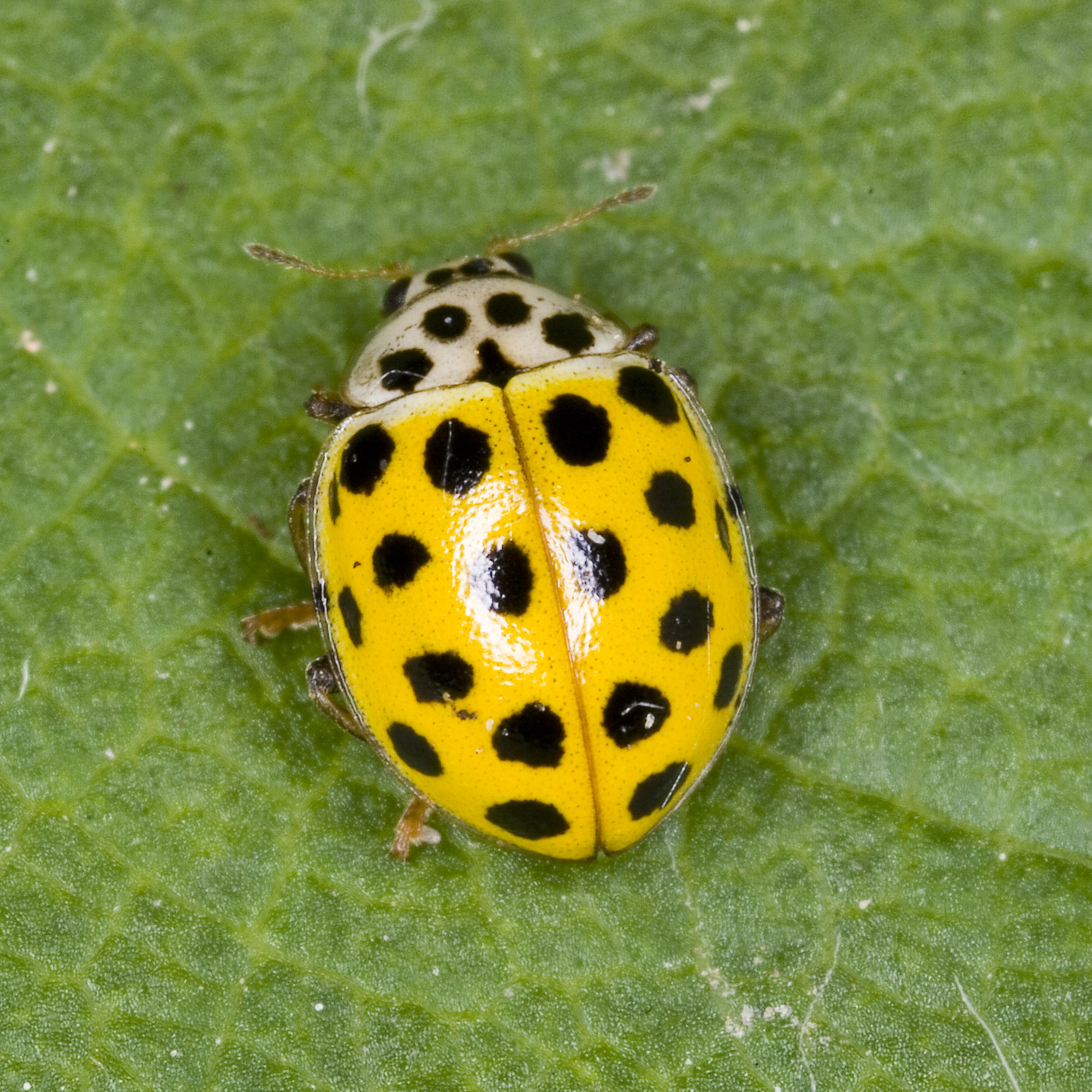

Scientific classification
- Kingdom: Animalia
- Phylum: Arthropoda
- Clade: Pancrustacea
- Class: Insecta
- Order: Coleoptera
- Suborder: Polyphaga
- Infraorder: Cucujiformia
- Family: Coccinellidae
- Genus: Psyllobora
- Species: P. vigintiduopunctata

Binomial name
- Psyllobora vigintiduopunctata (Linnaeus, 1758)

= Psyllobora vigintiduopunctata =

Species of beetle

Psyllobora vigintiduopunctata on grass in a forest

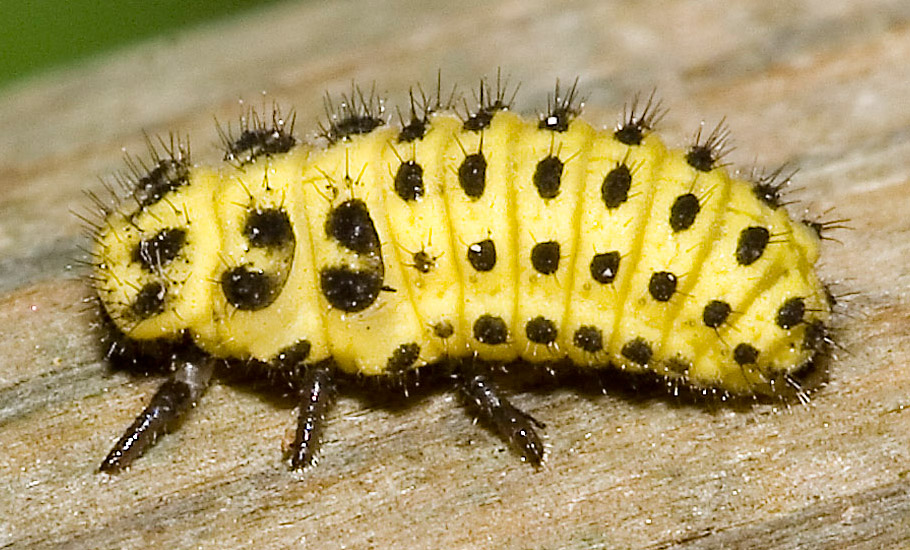
Larva

Psyllobora vigintiduopunctata (often abbreviated to Psyllobora 22-punctata), the 22-spot ladybird, (earlier known as Thea vigintiduopunctata) is a common, 3–5 mm long ladybird native to Europe. This species was originally discovered in Germany in 1874 on the leaves of Astragalus, consuming the hyphae of Erysiphe holosericea. The elytra are yellow in colour with 22 black spots. The pronotum is yellow or white with 5 black spots.

This is the only ladybird species in Britain and Ireland where the three life stages have very similar coloring and pattern; the pupa and larva look similar to the adult form, making them conspicuous and easier to identify. Unlike most other ladybirds which feed on aphids, P. 22-punctata eats mildew — especially from umbellifers and low-growing shrubs .

The 22-spot ladybird is best looked for amongst low vegetation. It has occasionally been found in woodlands, on lower branches of young trees and in some coastal areas. In a survey conducted between 1960 and 1965 by G.I. Savoiskaya in South-Eastern Kazakhstan, up to 500 individuals were found overwintering together in the leaf litter at the bases of birches, hawthorns and wild apple trees. These instances were noted as being found between 1000 meters and 2000 meters above sea level.

The Royal Botanic Gardens, Kew officially recorded their first 22-spot lady bird in 1969, publishing this finding along with many other additions to their wild flora and fauna records.

The hemolymph of the 22-spot ladybird beetle contains a dimeric alkaloid, psylloborine A, which has unique structural features, highlighting the species' complex chemical defenses and evolutionary adaptations.

== In popular culture ==
The 22-spot ladybird is the namesake of the Finnish indie rock band 22-Pistepirkko. In addition, this species has been featured on multiple postage stamps around the world.

- 2008 - Jersey. Listed under its former name of Thea vigintiduopunctata. Part of an illustrated six stamp "Insects" release. Designed by W. Oliver.
- 2015 - Belarus. A set of four illustrated and embossed "Insects; Ladybirds" (also sometimes listed as "2015 Beetles") stamps issued. Designed by Marina Vitkovskaya and Alexander Mityanin.
- 2017 - Slovenia. A set of three "Fauna; Ladybird" stamps issued. Designed by Robert Žvokelj.
- 2017 - India. A set of four illustrated "Ladybird Beetles of India" stamps issued. Psyllobora vigintiduopunctata had a face value of 15 Indian rupee.
- 2018 - Netherlands. Part of the "Experience Nature" series, featured in a ten stamp panel in the Insects and Spiders release. Designed by Frank Janse.
- 2024 - Romania. A set of four ladybird photographic stamps issued. Psyllobora vigintiduopunctata had a face value of 5 Romanian Lei. Designed by George Ursachi.

== Habitat and behavior ==
Psyllobora vigintiduopunctata is found in a wide range of habitats and semi-open and maintained areas. Low-dwelling species. Mostly grassy areas, such as meadows, pastures, fields, yards, parks, gardens, forest edges and open woodlands. Unlike other ladybird species that are found on the leaves of trees, this species is not found higher than 1 meter in height. In April they become very active and can be collected. Their most preferred plants are cowparsley, Senecio jacobaea and Cirsium arvense. Although flowering plants and low shrubs usually contain a large number of specimens. They can also be beaten by oak foliage and found on trees, but they are necessarily small ones.

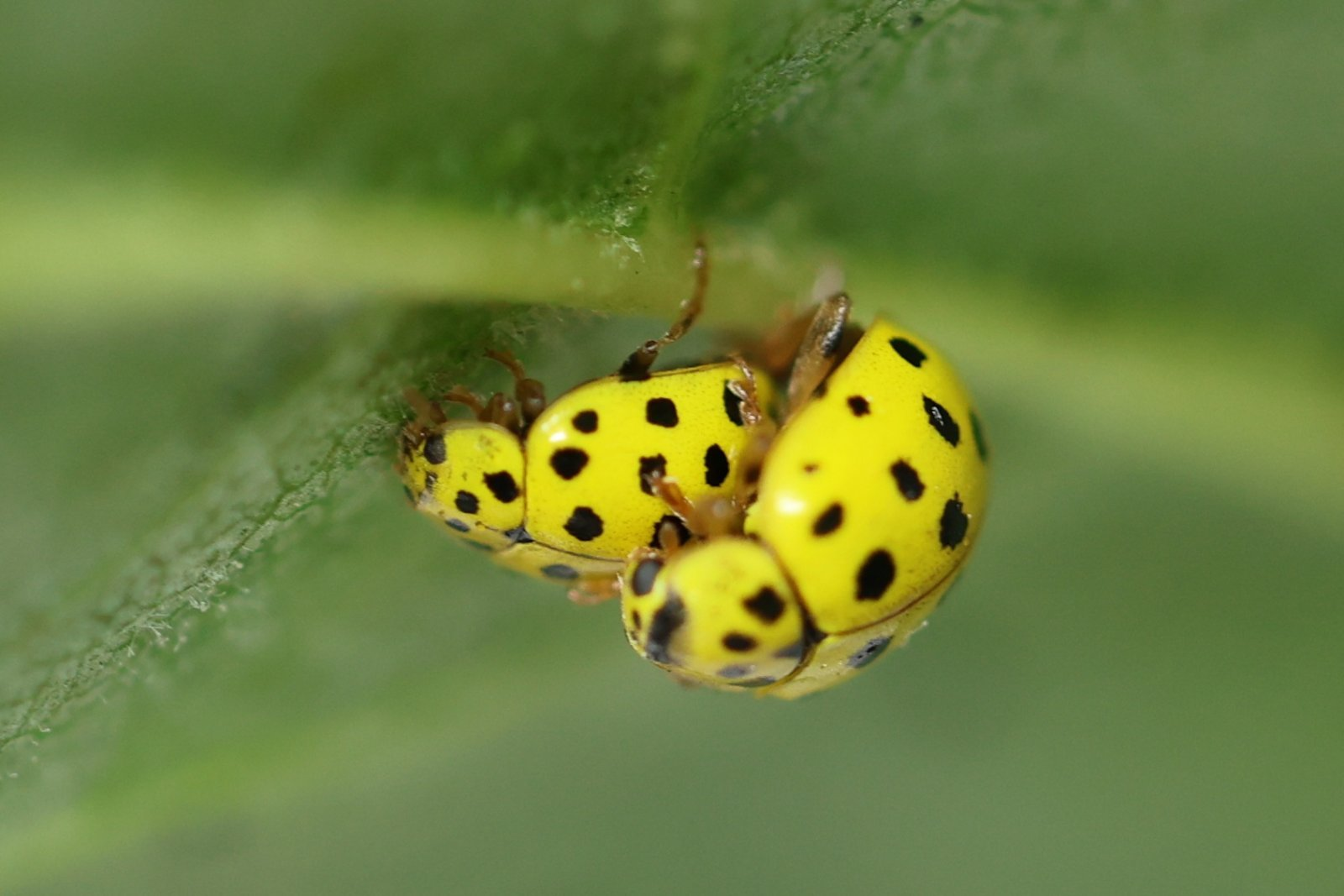
Psyllobora vigintiduopunctata pairing

== Copulation ==
Males are promiscuous. Mating occurs soon after imagining (days).

== Eggs ==
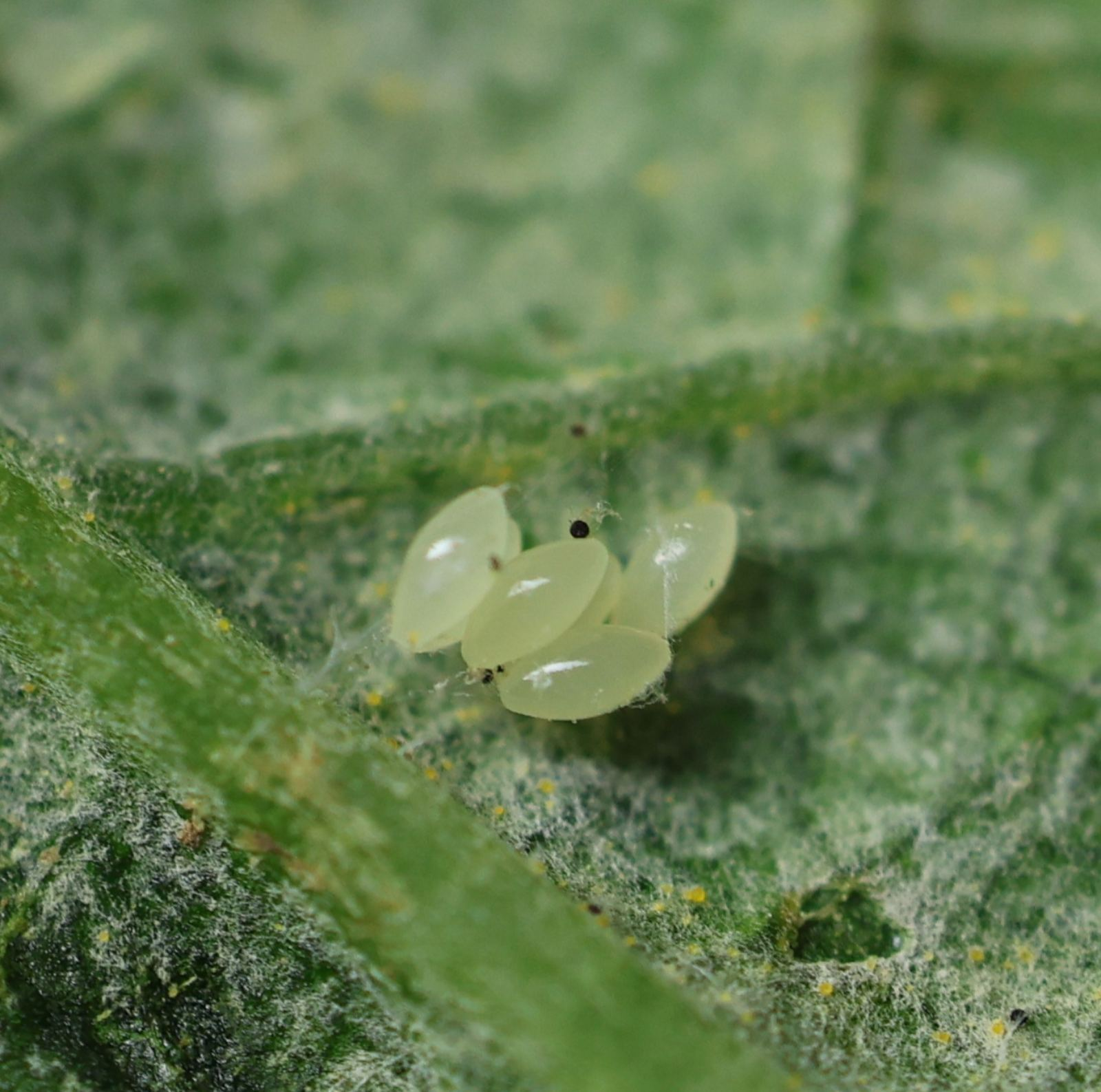
Eggs of 22-spot ladybird

Two weeks after mating, they begin to lay eggs. The eggs are laid under the leaves, preferably where there are plant fungi. From 20 to 100 eggs can be laid per female. Hatching occurs after five days. Unlike those of Psyllobora vigintimaculata, with which this species is often compared, the eggs of this species are slightly more yellowish. Otherwise, these eggs are generally very creamy, but not that small. The eggs of P. vigintimaculata are pale in color to slightly translucent white.

== Hatching ==
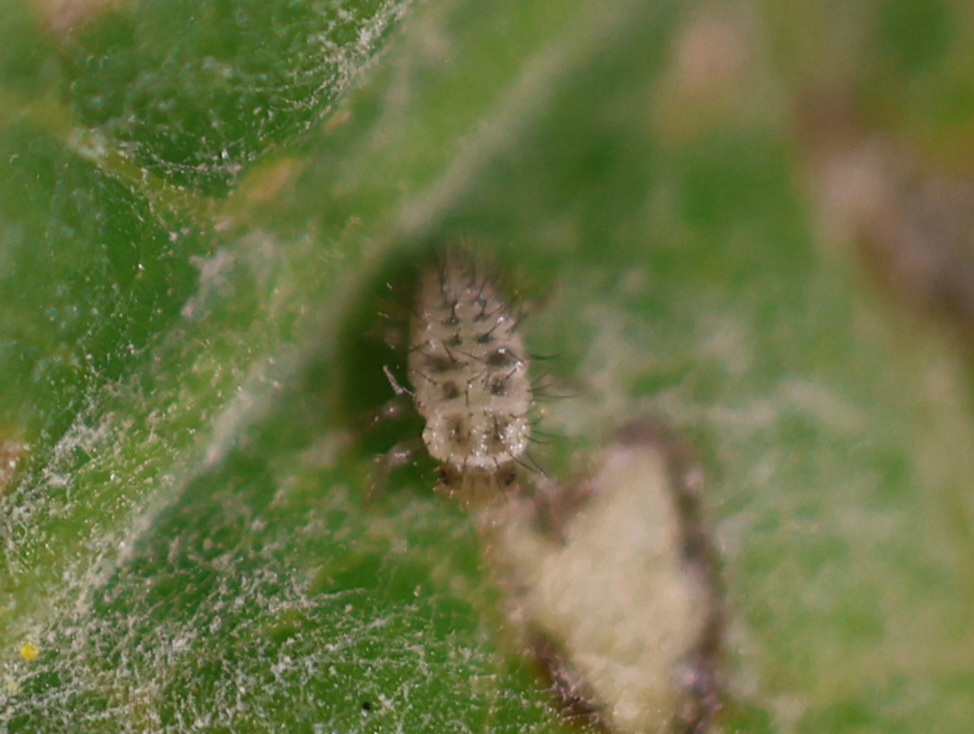
Newly-hatched larva of P. vigintiduopunctata

The basic color is a mix of gray and khaki with dark gray tubercules, from which dark gray hairs emerge. The head is similar in color to the tubercules, but somewhat lighter. The lower pronotal spots are slightly elongated and diffuse, unlike the smaller upper ones. The legs are also gray. Unlike most other species of the subfamily, the larvae after hatching P. vigintiduopunctata larvae do not feed on the egg chorion, but wait about 3 hours for the shells and then immediately start feeding on the plant fungus they are on. The length is 0.9 mm when hatched. The legs are lighter than the tubercules. Duration of the newly-hatched stage is 22 hours.

== First instar larvae ==
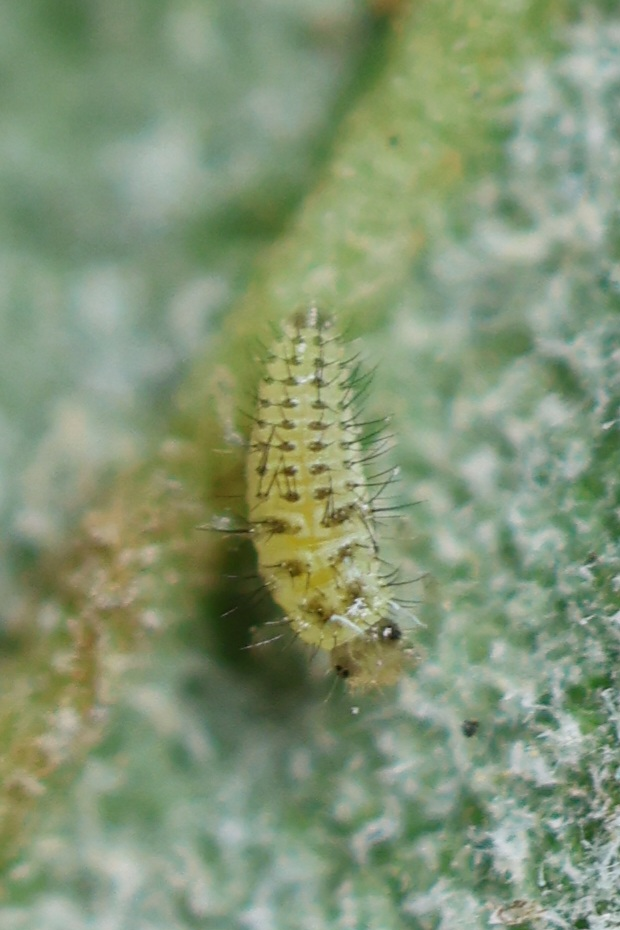
The first larval stage

The first instar is yellow, with the color becoming pale yellow, and the tubercules and spots changing to brownish. The pronotal spots are somewhat square-shaped and more fuzzy. The tubercule hairs are black. The abdomen is significantly elongated, and the length is 3 mm. The head is light pale, brownish, but up to the level of the eyes at the prosterior edges the brown is darkening. Towards the last abdominal segments the yellow color is so pale that it is downright beige. The last abdominal segment is dark in color (brown).

== Second instar larvae ==
There is a slight change in the coloration, which becomes the original one. The spots turn from brown to black, and the area around the eyes darkens. The head has darkened very slightly. The legs are a little darker brown. The tubercule hairs lighten. The length is 3 mm. The second stage lasts for 4 days.

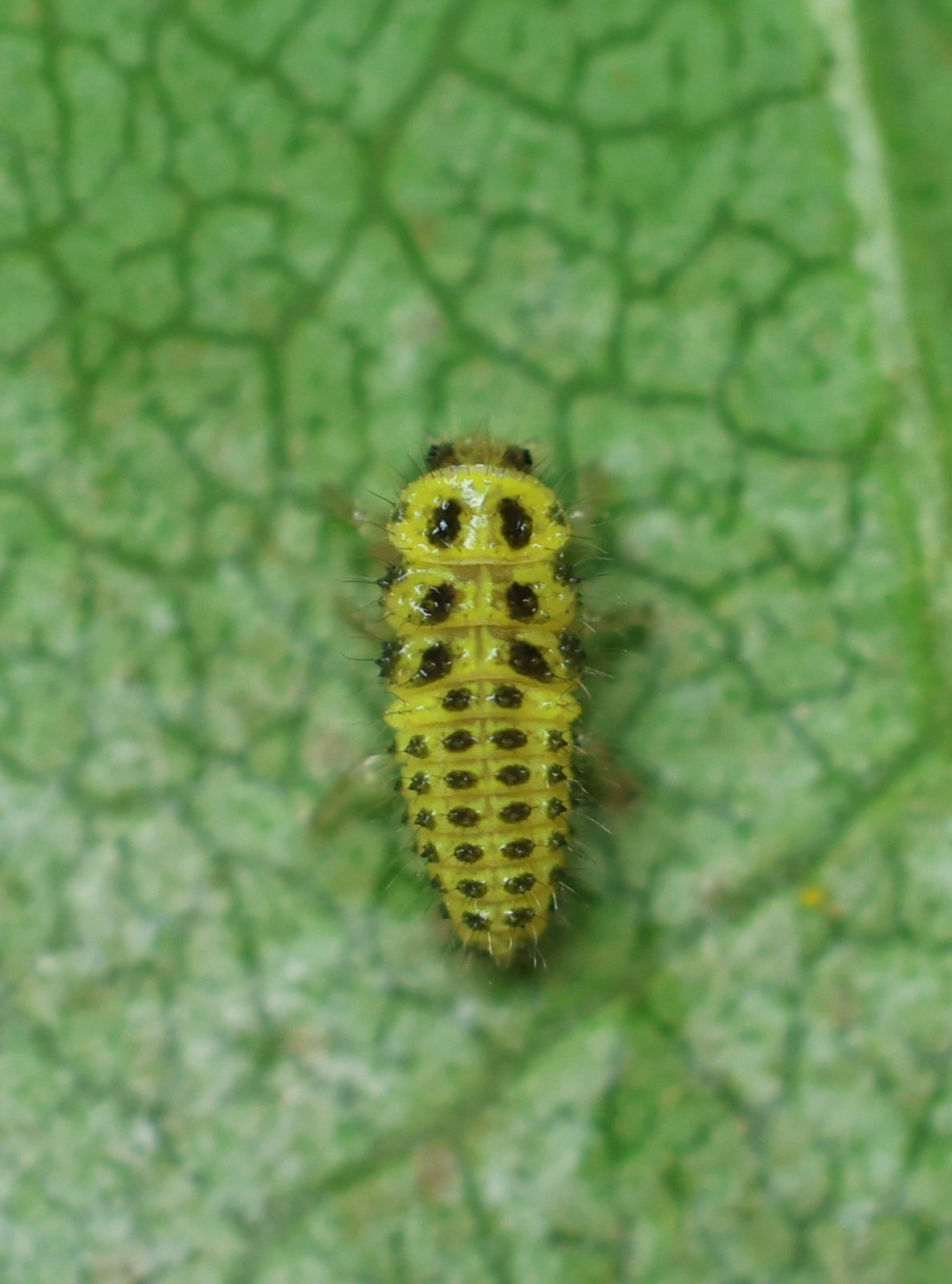
2nd instar

== Third instar ==
The length is 4 mm. One pair of spots on the pronotum recedes as it expands. The head becomes lighter and the body color darkens slightly.

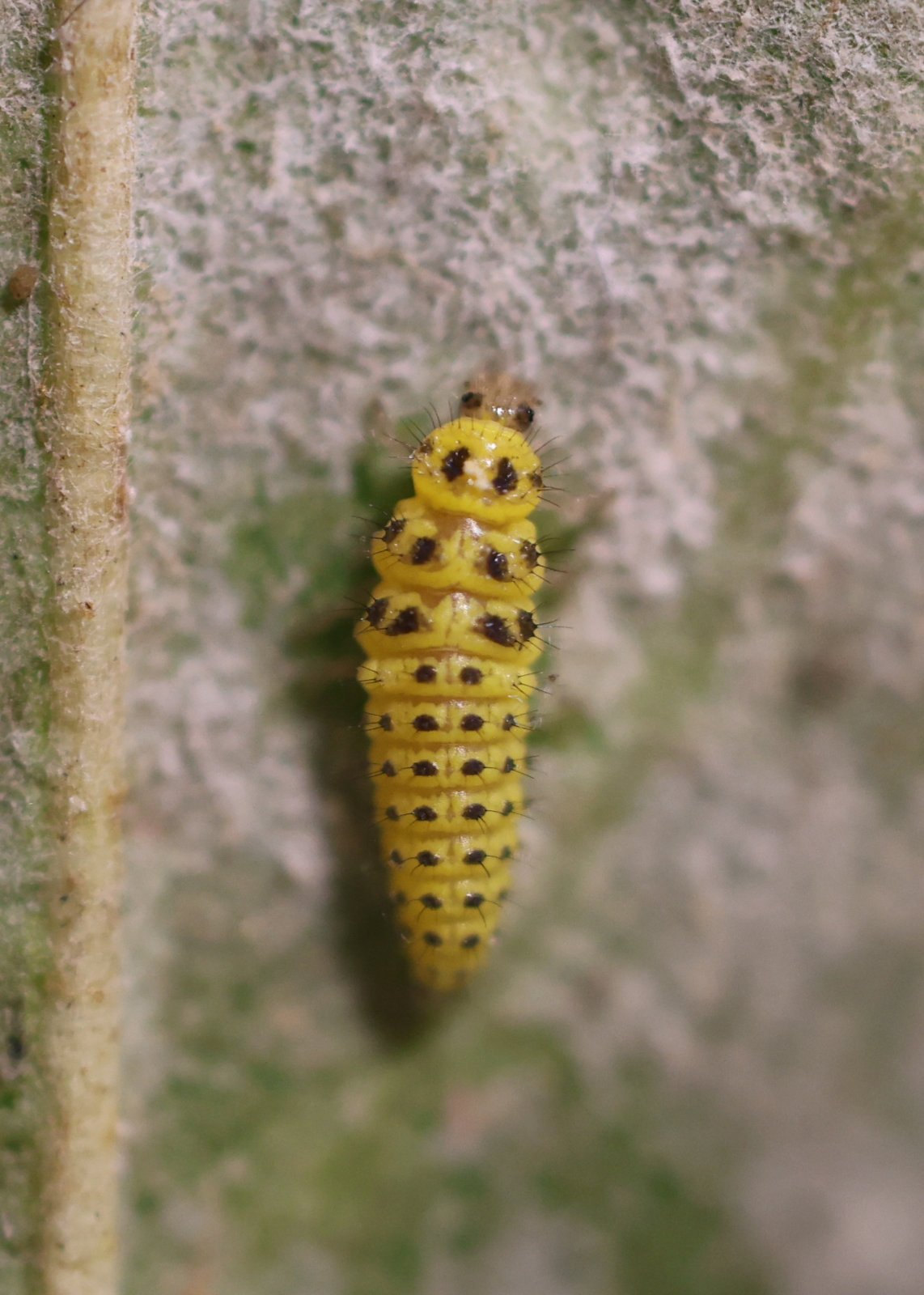
Larva in the 3rd instar

== Fourth instar ==
The larva has a yellow ground color and numerous black spots, just like the adult. The head is well-defined and hidden, and the mandibles are dark. The legs are approximately shorter than the width of the body. The last abdominal segment is shortened to only a slight curve, and not like other typical ladybirds with a well-developed suction cup for attachment to smooth surfaces. The early 4th staged larvae reach 5 mm in length, and two days later it elongates and grows to 6 mm. Fully grown, the larva often reaches over 7 mm and is ready for pupation. In preparation for pupation, it attaches itself to the leaves of plants and pupates within 24 hours or earlier. The last stage lasts 3 days.

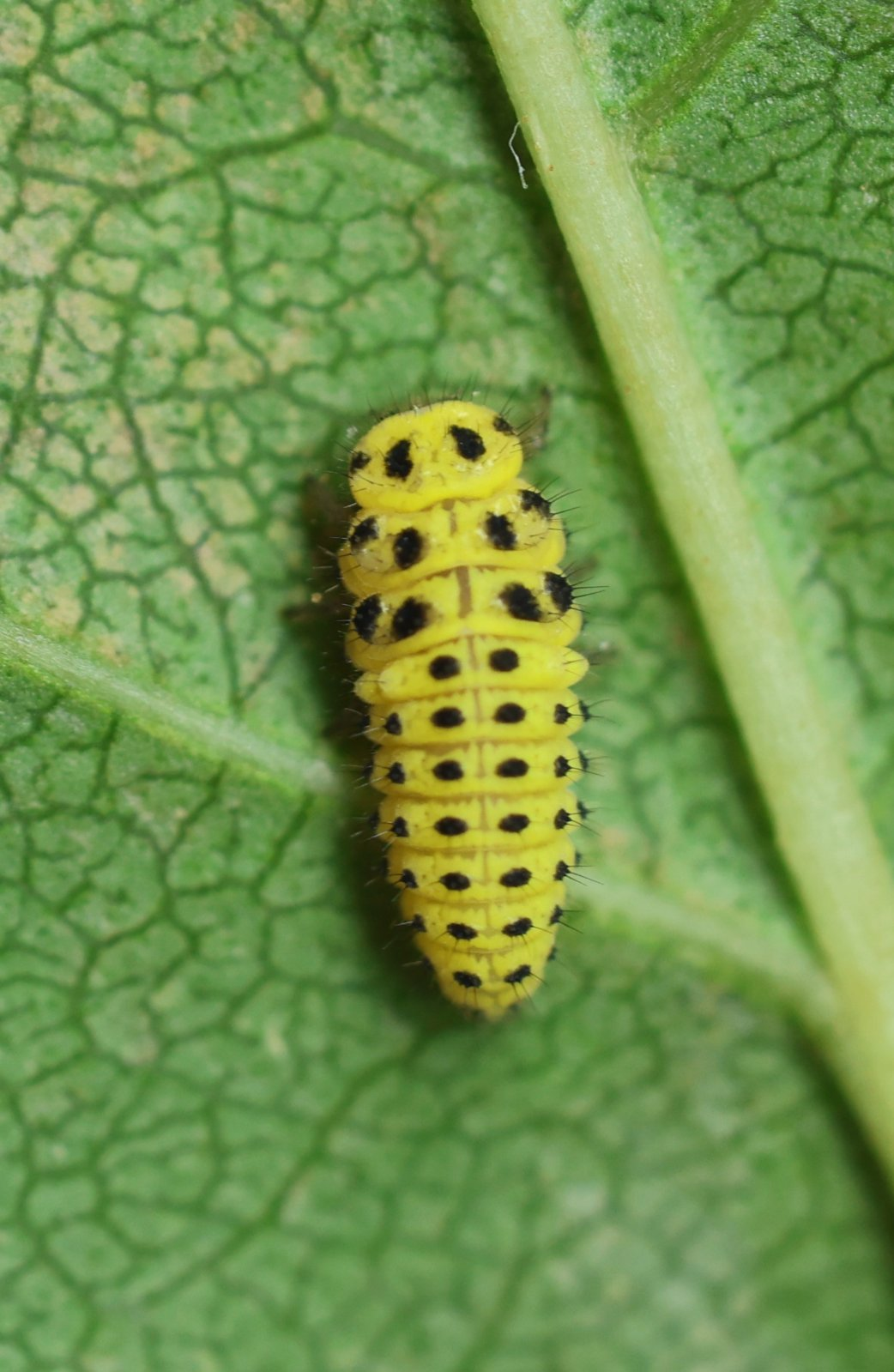
Last (4th) instar

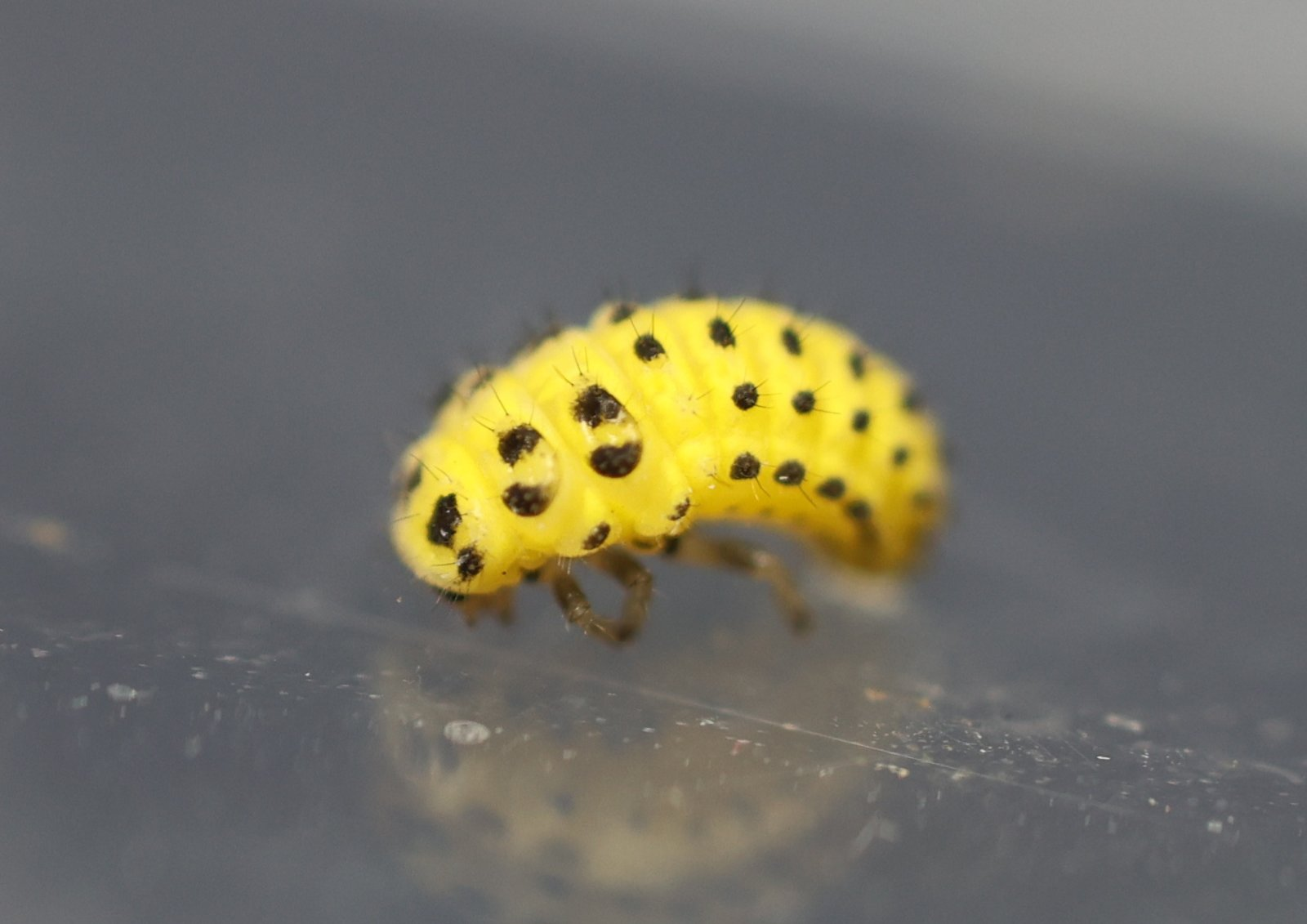
Prepupal state

== Pupa stage ==
The pupae have the same characteristic color like the larvae and the adults. They are bright yellow with dozens of black spots all over the body. They can be found on the under or upper side of the leaves. This stage lasts for about six days.

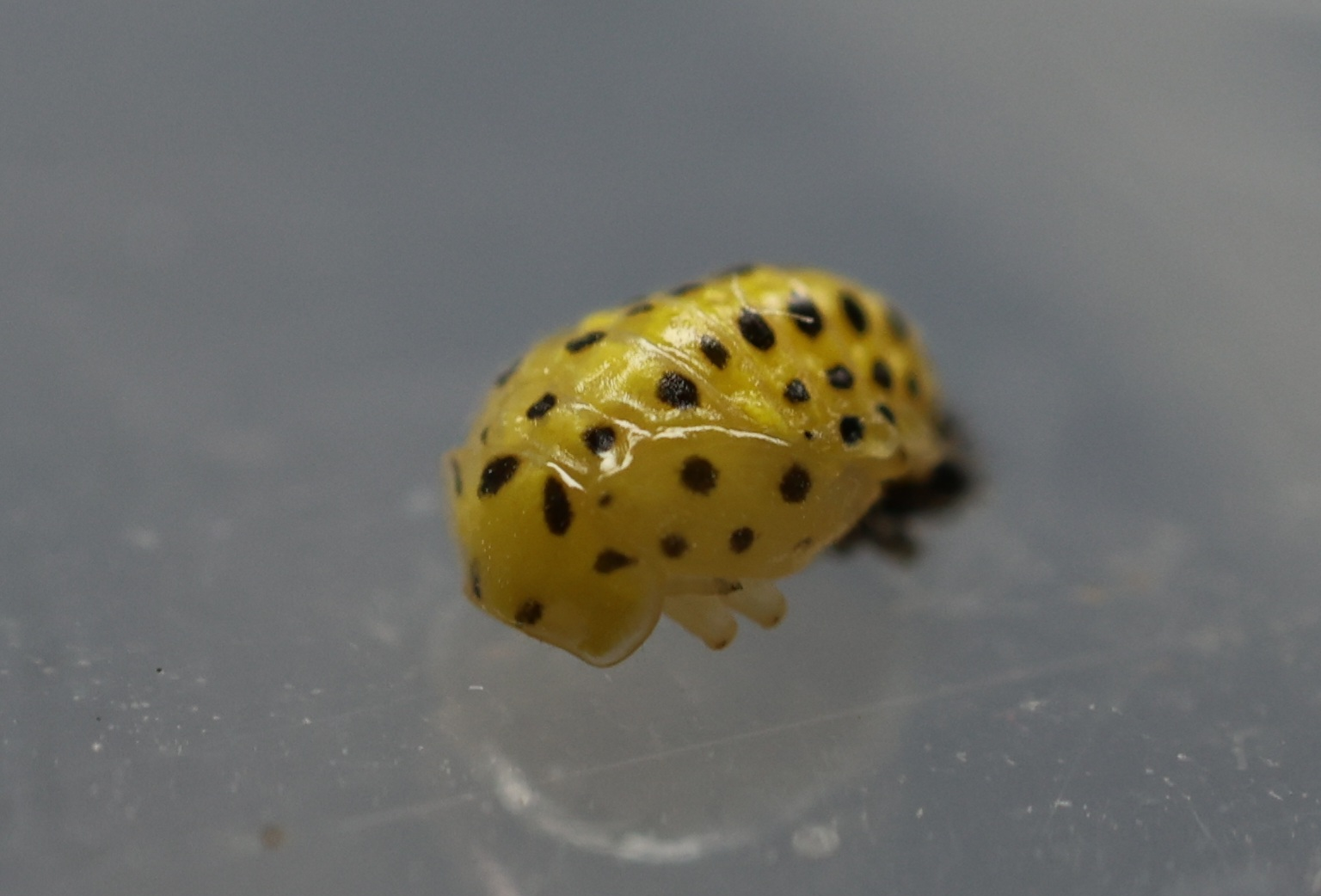
Pupa stage

== Imago ==
The newly hatched adults are translucent on the sides and are very soft and light. They will overwinter under fallen leaves, matted grass tussocks, or moist tree bark. However, there have been reported individuals found active all winter under dock leaves (Rumex) in a local park in the UK.

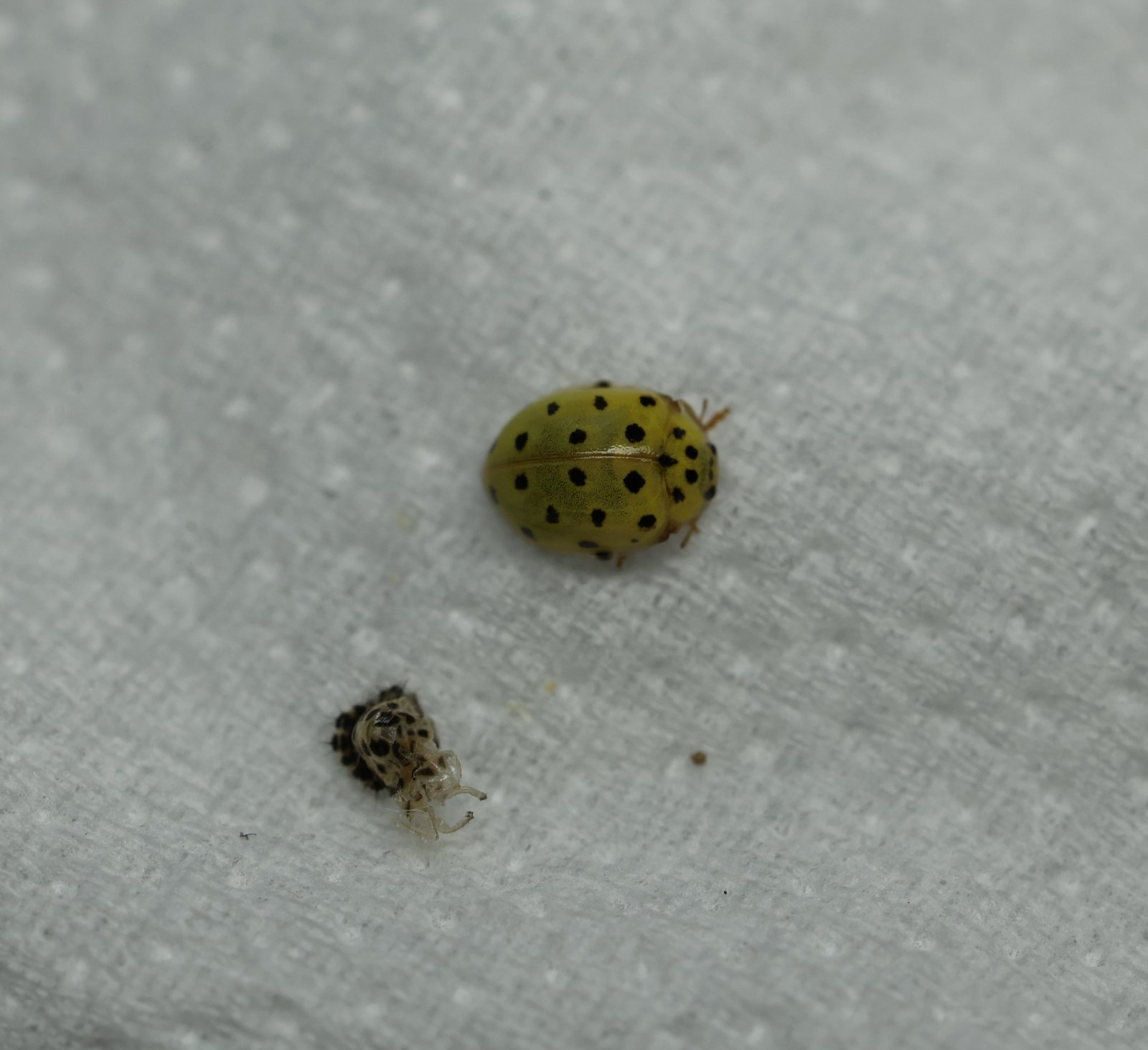
A freshly-hatched specimen of the 22-spot ladybird
