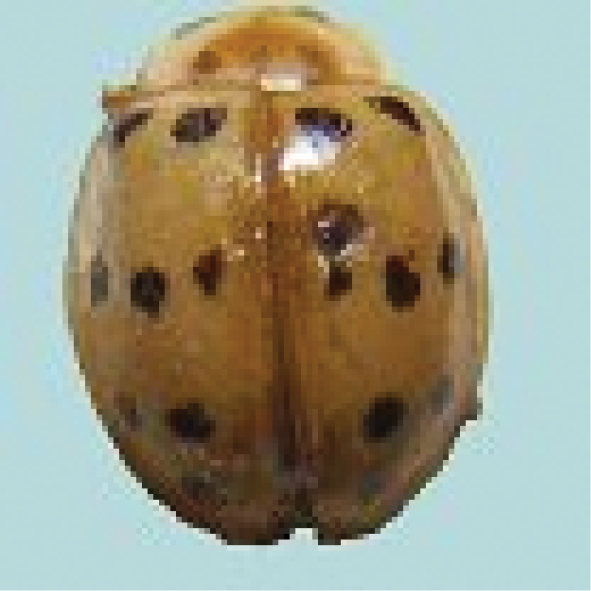

Scientific classification
- Kingdom: Animalia
- Phylum: Arthropoda
- Clade: Pancrustacea
- Class: Insecta
- Order: Coleoptera
- Suborder: Polyphaga
- Infraorder: Cucujiformia
- Family: Coccinellidae
- Genus: Psyllobora
- Species: P. bisoctonotata

Binomial name
- Psyllobora bisoctonotata (Mulsant, 1850)

= Psyllobora bisoctonotata =

Species of beetle

Psyllobora bisoctonotata is a species of lady beetle in the family Coccinellidae and the genus Psyllobora. It is found in India and surrounding Asian countries. Its main food source is Powdery Mildew and is a well known powdery mildew feeder in several countries.

== Description and identification ==
Psyllobora bisoctonotata is 3.20 – 3.50 mm in length, and 2.20 – 2.50 mm in width. Its appearance consists of a creamy yellow elytra which hosts 18 dots that vary in size and shape arranged in an 2 - 3 - 3 - 1 pattern. the pronotum has a pale brown, indistinct, roughly M-shaped marking on it.
