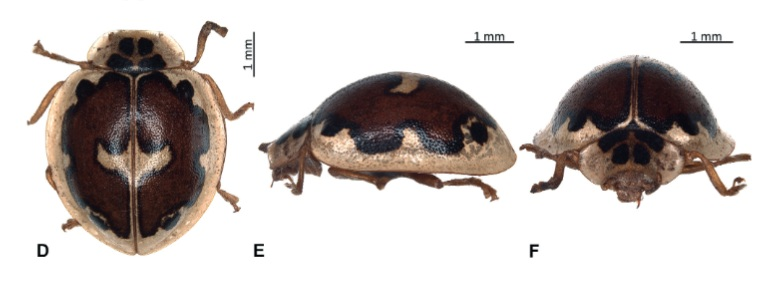

Scientific classification
- Kingdom: Animalia
- Phylum: Arthropoda
- Clade: Pancrustacea
- Class: Insecta
- Order: Coleoptera
- Suborder: Polyphaga
- Infraorder: Cucujiformia
- Family: Coccinellidae
- Genus: Psyllobora
- Species: P. marshalli

Binomial name
- Psyllobora marshalli Crotch, 1874

Synonyms
- Psyllobora insulicola Mader, 1958

= Psyllobora marshalli =

Species of beetle

Psyllobora marshalli is a species of beetle of the family Coccinellidae. It is found in French Guiana and Ecuador.
