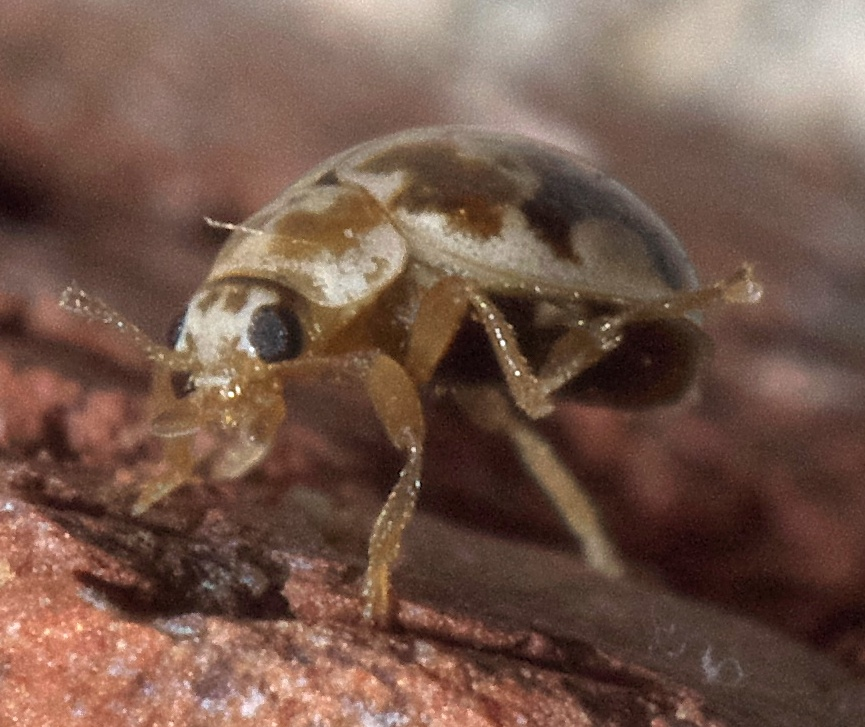

Scientific classification
- Kingdom: Animalia
- Phylum: Arthropoda
- Clade: Pancrustacea
- Class: Insecta
- Order: Coleoptera
- Suborder: Polyphaga
- Infraorder: Cucujiformia
- Family: Coccinellidae
- Genus: Psyllobora
- Species: P. renifer

Binomial name
- Psyllobora renifer Casey, 1899

Synonyms
- Psyllobora renifera

= Psyllobora renifer =

Species of beetle

Psyllobora renifer is a species of lady beetle in the family Coccinellidae and the genus Psyllobora. It is found in Central America and North America. Its main food source is powdery mildew.

== Appearance ==
Adults reach a length of about 1.75 - 2.4 mm in length. Its appearance consists of dark kidney shaped splotches on the elytra with lighter splotches on the pronotum

A distinction from other Psyllobora species is that the splotches on the elytra are more connected with each other, merging into larger confluent patches rather than distinct spots.

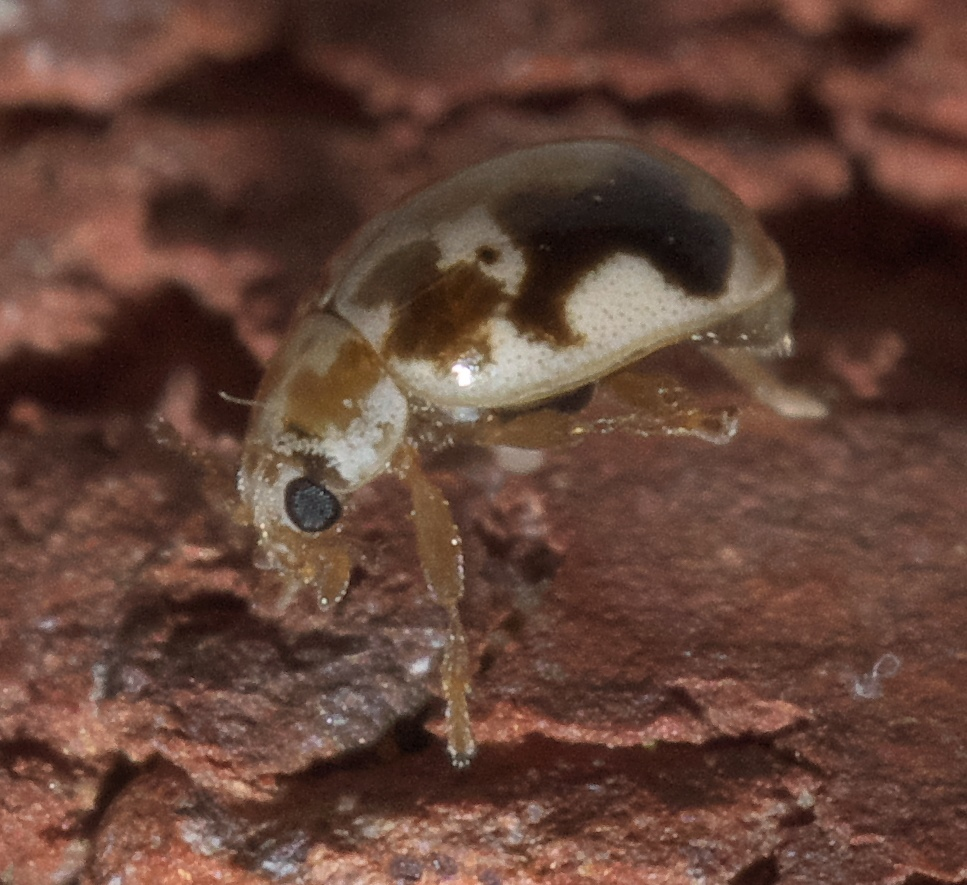
Kidney-spotted psyllobora, Psyllobora renifer
