= 22-Pistepirkko =

Finnish rock band

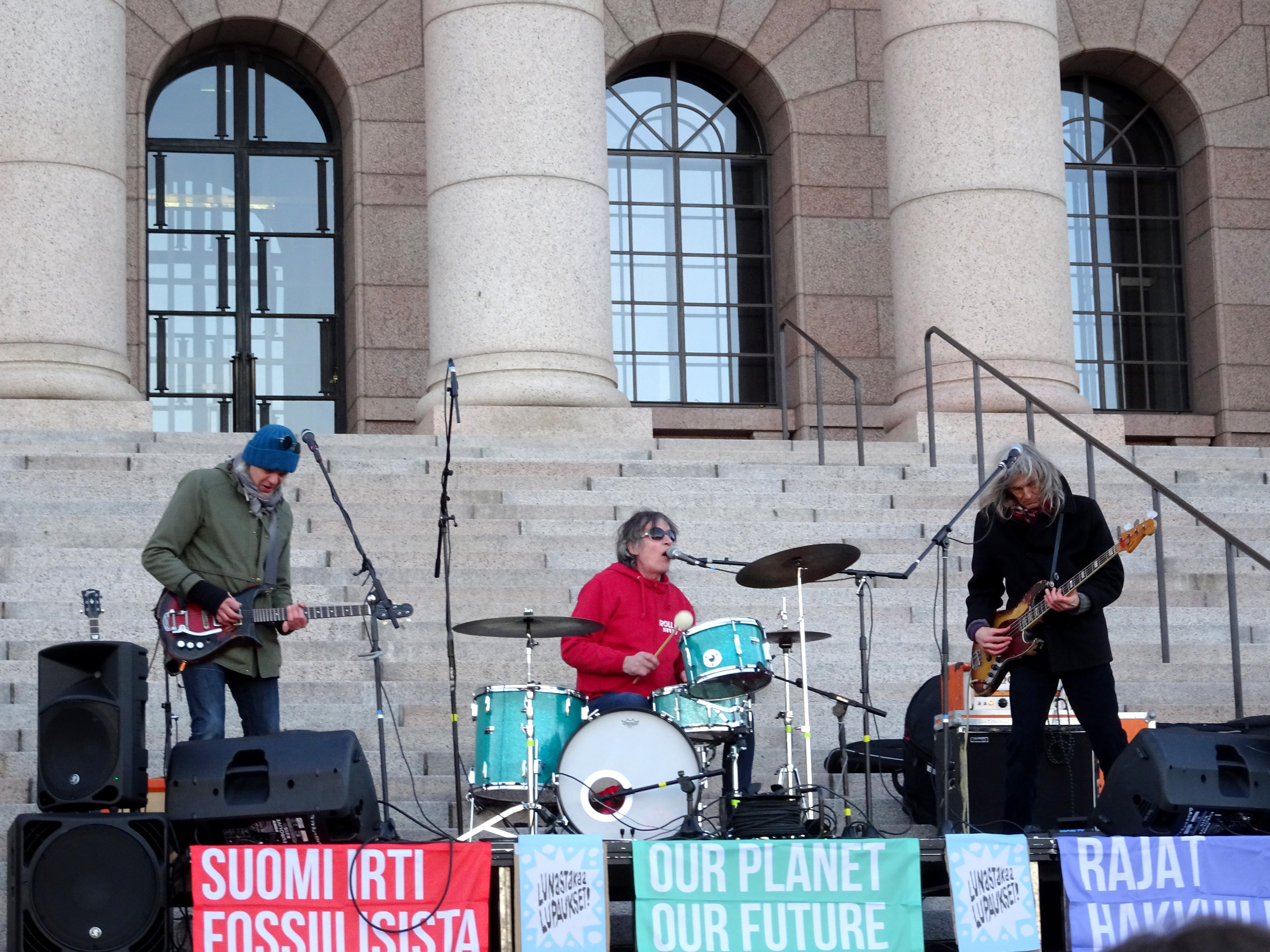
- 22-Pistepirkko performing in 2022

Background information
- Also known as: The Others; 22PP
- Origin: Utajärvi, Finland
- Genres: Indie rock, indie pop, garage rock, neo-psychedelia
- Years active: 1980–2015, 2022–2024
- Label: Bone Voyage Recording Company
- Members: P-K Keränen; Espe Haverinen; Asko Keränen
- Website: 22-pistepirkko.fi

22-Pistepirkko (Finnish pronunciation: [ˈkɑkskytkɑks ˈpistepːirkːo]) was a Finnish indie rock band formed in 1980. It was formed in a small rural village of Utajärvi in Northern Finland but moved to Helsinki, the capital of Finland, in 1985. The band now produces music in English, though at first their main language was Finnish. The band name means "22-spot ladybird" in Finnish.

Their early albums were inspired by rock and roll and underground icons like Bo Diddley and The Sonics, but they have developed their unique sound by adding other influences to their music. Today they play an unconventional but distinctive mixture of pop, punk, rock and electronica, and achieved this fusion before artists such as Primal Scream or Beck popularized this kind of sound.

During 22-Pistepirkko's 2001 European tour, director Andreas Haaning Christiansen traveled with the band and shot a documentary, Sleep good, rock well, which was released on DVD in 2005.

The band broke up in 2015 but later got back together, and released a new album in 2022, called Kind Hearts Have a Run Run. They played their last concerts in summer 2024.

== Discography ==
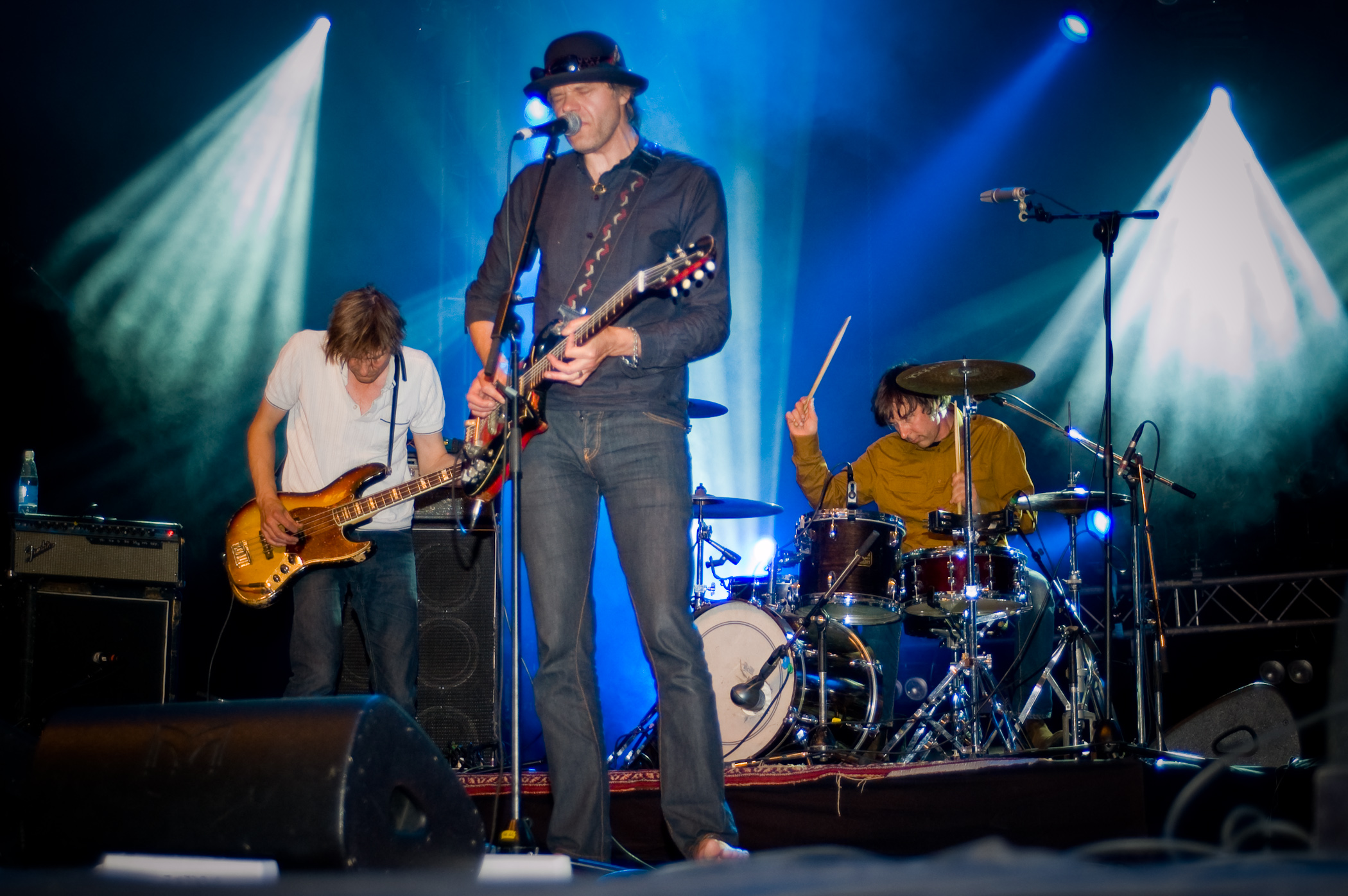
22-Pistepirkko in 2008

=== Studio albums ===
- Piano, rumpu ja kukka (1984)
- The Kings of Hong Kong (1987)
- Bare Bone Nest (1989)
- Big Lupu (1992)
- Rumble City, LaLa Land (1994)
- Zipcode (1996)
- Eleven (1998)
- Downhill City (1999)
- Rally of Love (2001)
- The Nature of 22-Pistepirkko (2002)
- Drops & Kicks (2005)
- (Well You Know) Stuff Is Like We Yeah! (2008)
- Lime Green Delorean (2011)
- Kind Hearts Have a Run Run (2022)

=== Cover albums ===
- Monochromeset (2006, under the name The Others)

=== Compilations ===
- The Singles (5 CDs and 1 DVD with 51 tracks from 20 singles, 31 live-tracks and 35 videos)
