= Zipcode (album) =

Remix album by 22-Pistepirkko
- Released: 1996

22-Pistepirkko chronology
Zipcode (1996)	Eleven (1998)

Professional ratings
Review scores
Source	Rating
Allmusic	2.5/5 stars

Zipcode is a 22-Pistepirkko's remix and remake album. It was released in 1996.

== Track listing ==
1. Tired of Being Drunk (Aleksei Borisov & Tetris)
2. Swamp Blues (Martin Rev)
3. Wild Billy (Utah Saints)
4. Roundabout (22-P)
5. I Never Said (Vesa Lankinen)
6. Little Bit More (remake by Larry and The Lefthanded)
7. Snowy Dave (MOM)
8. Oo My Head (Theory)
9. Oo My Head (Vesa Lankinen)
10. Don't Play Cello (remake by Arno)
11. Don't Say I'm So Evil (P.Rajanti & J.Jaakonaho)
12. Horror O'Horrible (remake by 22-P)
13. Bubblegum Couple (Peter Zaremba)
14. Gimme Some Water (Ilkka Mattila)
15. Birdy (remake by Jimi Tenor)
