= Piano, rumpu ja kukka =

1984 album by 22-Pistepirkko

Studio album by 22-Pistepirkko
- Released: 1984

22-Pistepirkko chronology
Piano, rumpu ja kukka (1984)	The Kings of Hong Kong (1987)

Piano, rumpu ja kukka (which means "a piano, a drum and a flower") is the first album by 22-Pistepirkko. It was released in 1984.

== Track listing ==
1. "Kellarissa"
2. "Metsässä kukkia"
3. "Kathy"
4. "I Need Love"
5. "Sinun suuri sukusi"
6. "Prinsessa"
7. "Noita"
8. "Kuusi poikamiestä"
9. "Enkeli lensi pois"
10. "Jealouse & Joey"
11. "Let's Dance"
12. "Kissa"
13. "Soiva talo"
