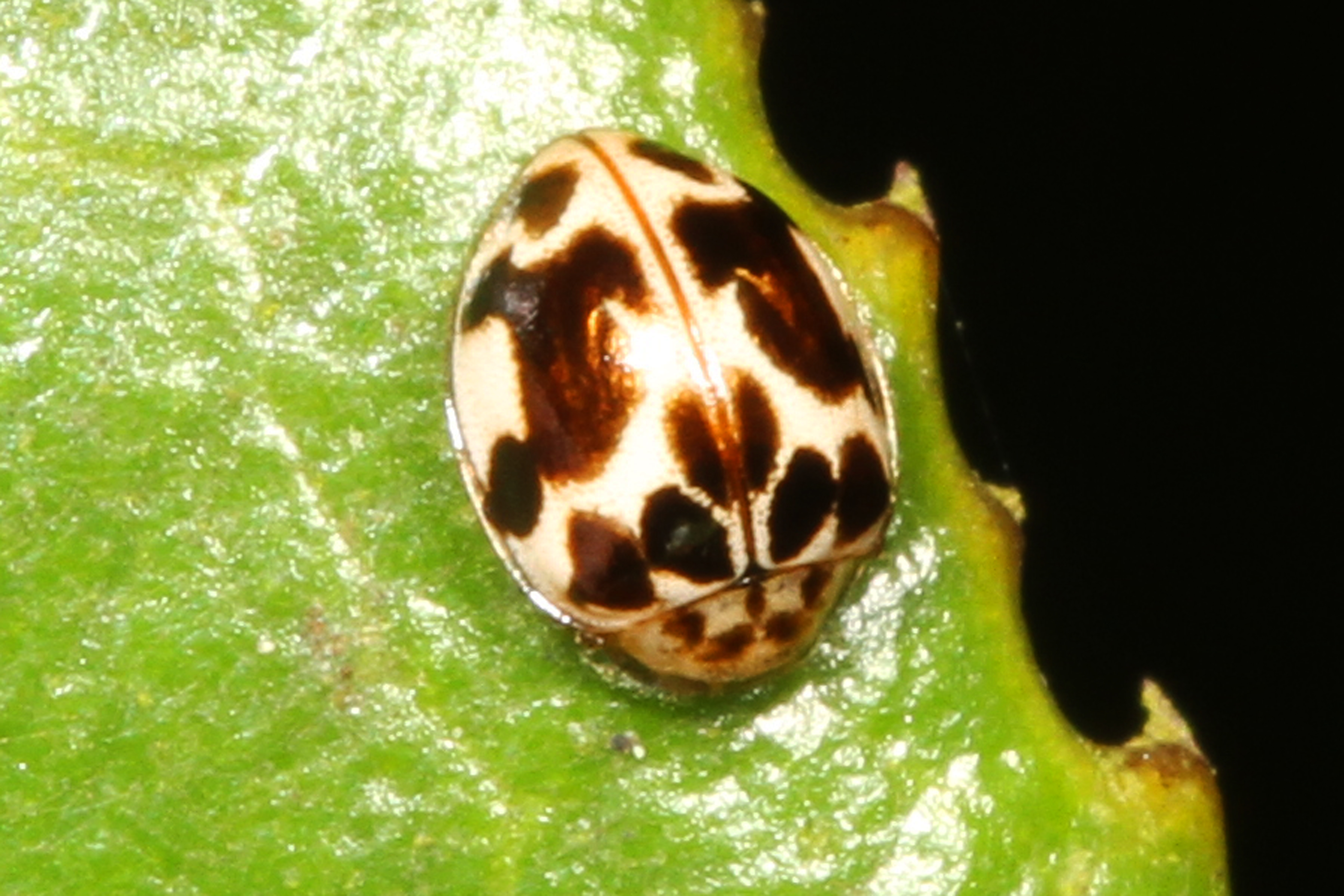

Scientific classification
- Kingdom: Animalia
- Phylum: Arthropoda
- Clade: Pancrustacea
- Class: Insecta
- Order: Coleoptera
- Suborder: Polyphaga
- Infraorder: Cucujiformia
- Family: Coccinellidae
- Genus: Psyllobora
- Species: P. vigintimaculata

Binomial name
- Psyllobora vigintimaculata (Say, 1824)

Synonyms
- Coccinella vigintimaculata Say, 1824; Psyllobora vigintisignata Boheman, 1859; Psyllobora intersparsa Boheman, 1859; Psyllobora taedata LeConte, 1857; Psyllobora obsoleta Casey, 1899; Psyllobora separata Casey, 1899

= Psyllobora vigintimaculata =

Species of beetle

Psyllobora vigintimaculata, the twenty-spotted lady beetle, is a species of lady beetle in the family Coccinellidae. It is found in North America, where it has been recorded from Newfoundland to Alaska in the north and from Virginia to Tennessee and Louisiana, west to southern California.

== Appearance ==
P. vigintimaculata is about 1.75–3.0 mm in length, lives 1-2 years, and has four or five distinctive dark spots on the pronotum in an "M" shape. The elytra have dark, orange or bicolored spots on a white background. Although it is sometimes confused with the fourteen-spotted lady beetle (Propylea quatuordecimpunctata) and the Asian lady beetle (Harmonia axyridis), its unique pattern helps to distinguish it from other lady beetle species found in North America.

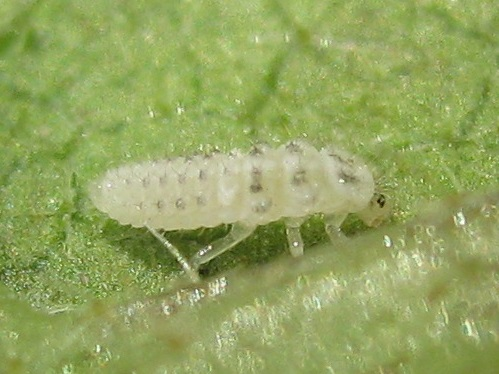
P. vigintimaculata, larva

== Life cycle ==
In a laboratory setting, the subspecies P. vigintimaculata taedata undergoes four larval instars, molting and then pupation. The timing of life cycle varies according to rearing conditions.

=== Instars and pupation ===
The first instar larvae has a white oval body with small hairs projecting from the thorax. The larvae of the second instar have a stripe and a much darker color that gradually turns lighter with each subsequent instar. During the end of the fourth instar, the larva attaches itself to a leaf or a petiole to molt. Pupae emerge with wing pads as well as black spots.

=== Duration ===
When eggs were deposited in 20°C it took about 32 days for adults to emerge. At 25°C it took about 20 days.

== Potential as biological control ==
It has been proposed that P. vigintimaculata could be used in place of fungicides as a biological control. This is because of its ability to utilize olfactory cues to seek out and feed on plants infected with powdery mildew, which is an agriculturally significant plant parasite. For example, P. vigintimaculata was also involved in an experiment with a group of organisms that are predators of the pests that consume and damage the Jatropha curcas crop grown in Brazil. Although it was shown that they don't include the pests as often in their diet as other organisms, they did prove the importance of predator response in prey density that ultimately decides the survivorship of the J. curcas crop. This could help solve problems associated with current control methods like resistance, effect on non-target plants, and worker's safety. However, arthropod consumption of mildew and its potential for disease control is understudied. Some important considerations involve insect and mildew density, ability to locate food as well as seasonality of feeding.

== Parasitism ==
=== Hesperomyces virescens ===
The fungal parasite Hesperomyces virescens Thaxter has been reported to infect P. vigintimaculata. More recent work has suggested that this parasite consists of multiple species, one per host, though the species living on P. vigintimaculata has not yet been formally described. The level of harm that the parasite causes to its host is unclear.
