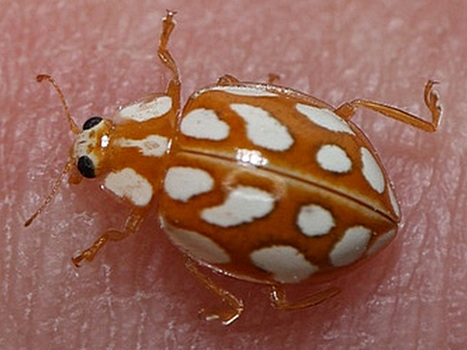

Scientific classification
- Kingdom: Animalia
- Phylum: Arthropoda
- Clade: Pancrustacea
- Class: Insecta
- Order: Coleoptera
- Suborder: Polyphaga
- Infraorder: Cucujiformia
- Family: Coccinellidae
- Genus: Halyzia
- Species: H. tschitscherini

Binomial name
- Halyzia tschitscherini Semenov, 1895

= Halyzia tschitscherini =

Species of beetle

Halyzia tschitscherini is a species of beetle of the family Coccinellidae. It is found in India (Himachal Pradesh, Jammu & Kashmir, Uttarakhand), Pakistan, Afghanistan, Turkmenistan, Kazakhstan and the Pamir Mountains.

== Description ==
Adults reach a length of about 5.1–5.7 mm (0.20–0.22 in). They are ochreous to reddish brown, with creamy white to white maculae on the pronotum and elytra and with the lateral borders of both transparent.

== Life history ==
They have been recorded feeding on powdery mildew caused by Phyllactinia corylea on mulberry.
