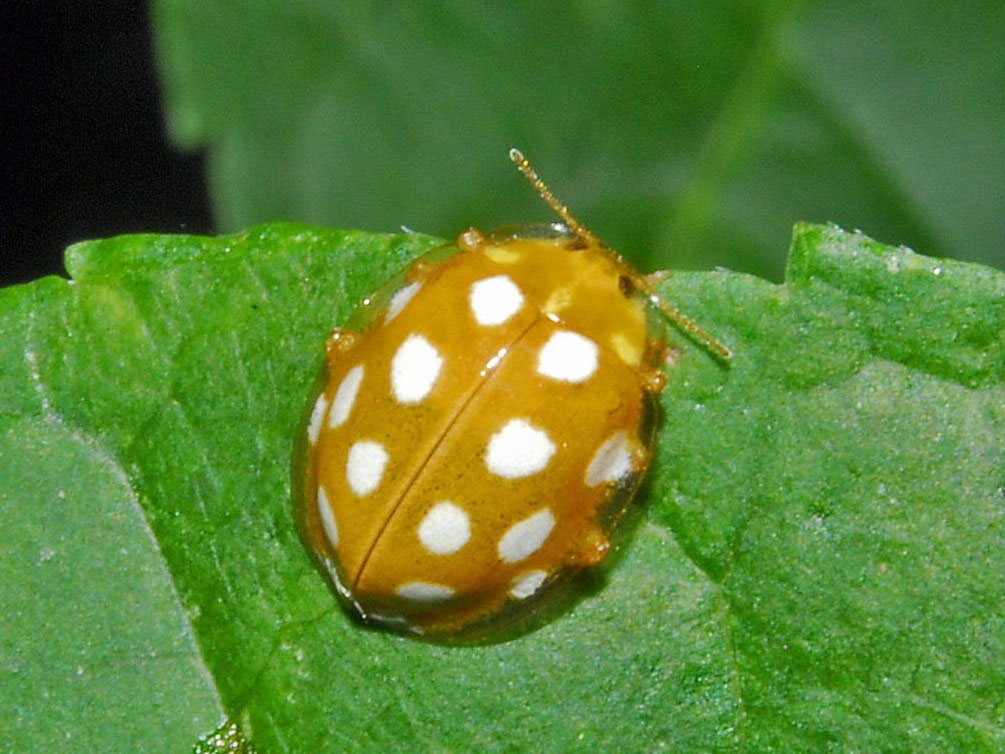
- Halyzia sedecimguttata

Scientific classification
- Kingdom: Animalia
- Phylum: Arthropoda
- Clade: Pancrustacea
- Class: Insecta
- Order: Coleoptera
- Suborder: Polyphaga
- Infraorder: Cucujiformia
- Family: Coccinellidae
- Genus: Halyzia; Mulsant, 1846

= Halyzia =

Genus of beetles

Halyzia is a genus in the ladybird family, Coccinellidae. Halyzia is concentrated in European deciduous forests. They can be found in the edges of woodlands or bushes.

Halyzia, like many insects has an egg stage, a larval stage, a pupa stage and an adult stage. Once the female lays her eggs, they will hatch in 4–10 days. Halyzia will molt many times before it becomes a full grown adult. Like moths, Halyzia is attracted to light. These Insects will be frequently found in moth traps.

== Species ==
Species within this genus include:

- Halyzia bacthaiensis
- Halyzia dejavu
- Halyzia ichiyanagii
- Halyzia laminata
- Halyzia maculata
- Halyzia nepalensis Canepari, 2003
- Halyzia sanscrita Mulsant, 1853
- Halyzia sedecimguttata (Linnaeus, 1758)
- Halyzia shirozui
- Halyzia straminea (Hope in Gray, 1831)
- Halyzia tschitscherini Semenow, 1895

== Selected former species ==
- Halyzia feae Gorham, 1895
