= Halyzia maculata =

Scientific classification
- Kingdom: Animalia
- Phylum: Arthropoda
- Clade: Pancrustacea
- Class: Insecta
- Order: Coleoptera
- Suborder: Polyphaga
- Infraorder: Cucujiformia
- Family: Coccinellidae
- Genus: Halyzia
- Species: H. maculata

Binomial name
- Halyzia maculata Jing, 1987

Species of beetle

Halyzia maculata is a species of beetle of the family Coccinellidae. It is found in China (Yunnan).
