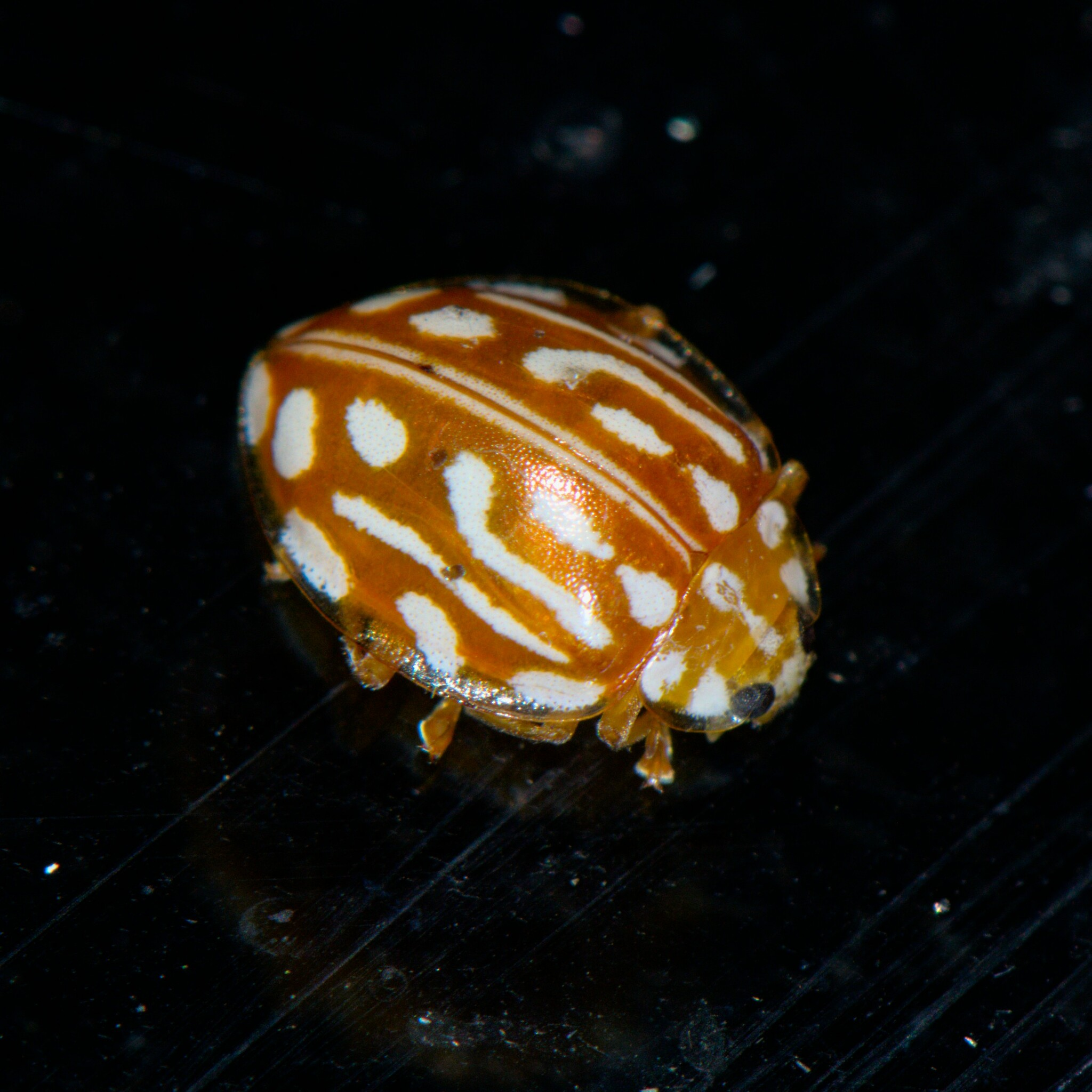

Scientific classification
- Kingdom: Animalia
- Phylum: Arthropoda
- Clade: Pancrustacea
- Class: Insecta
- Order: Coleoptera
- Suborder: Polyphaga
- Infraorder: Cucujiformia
- Family: Coccinellidae
- Genus: Halyzia
- Species: H. sanscrita

Binomial name
- Halyzia sanscrita Mulsant, 1853

= Halyzia sanscrita =

Species of beetle

Halyzia sanscrita is a species of beetle in the family Coccinellidae. It is found in China, Taiwan, Tibet, India, and Yemen.

== Description ==
Adults are approximately 0.52-0.61 cm in length. They are oval in shape. The head is yellowish-white, the pronotum yellowish-brown, and the elytra orange-brown. The pronotum has five white spots, with one in the center and two on either side. Each elytron has ten creamy white markings and a suture of the same color. The pronotum and outer edges of the elytra are transparent.

== Ecology ==
The species if fungivorous, with adults feeding primarily on mildew. During the day, they are often found on the undersides of mildew-infested leaves.

== Etymology ==
The species name sanscrita is derived from the Sanskrit-like markings on the beetle's elytra.
