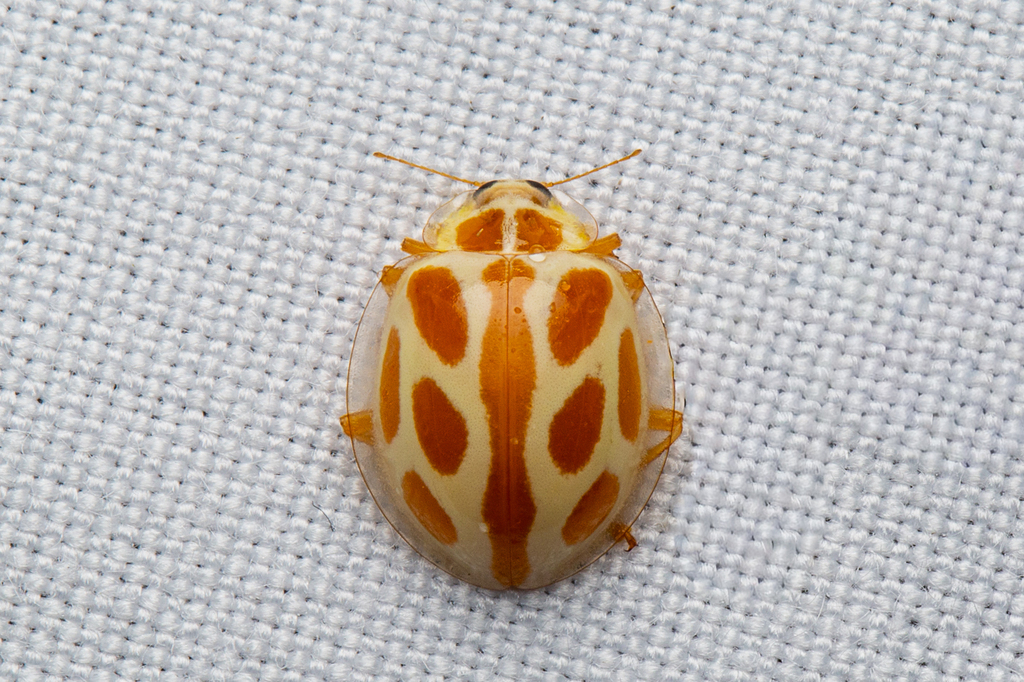

Scientific classification
- Kingdom: Animalia
- Phylum: Arthropoda
- Clade: Pancrustacea
- Class: Insecta
- Order: Coleoptera
- Suborder: Polyphaga
- Infraorder: Cucujiformia
- Family: Coccinellidae
- Genus: Halyzia
- Species: H. dejavu

Binomial name
- Halyzia dejavu Poorani & Booth, 2006

= Halyzia dejavu =

Species of beetle

Halyzia dejavu is a species of beetle of the family Coccinellidae. It is found in India (Arunachal Pradesh, Sikkim), Nepal, Bhutan and China.

== Description ==
Adults reach a length of about 8.05–8.5 mm (0.317–0.335 in). The head, pronotum and elytra are bright creamy to lemon yellow, the pronotum with two reddish brown to ochreous brown spots. The scutellum is yellow with a pale brown border. Each elytron has four reddish brown to dull brown spots and the elytral suture has a dull brown to reddish brown stripe. The lateral sides of the pronotum and elytra are transparent.

== Life history ==
They have been recorded preying on aphids.
