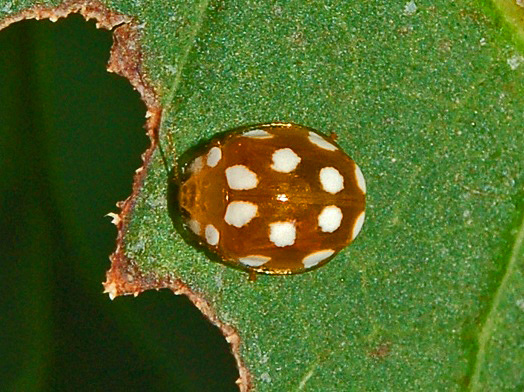
- Dorsal view
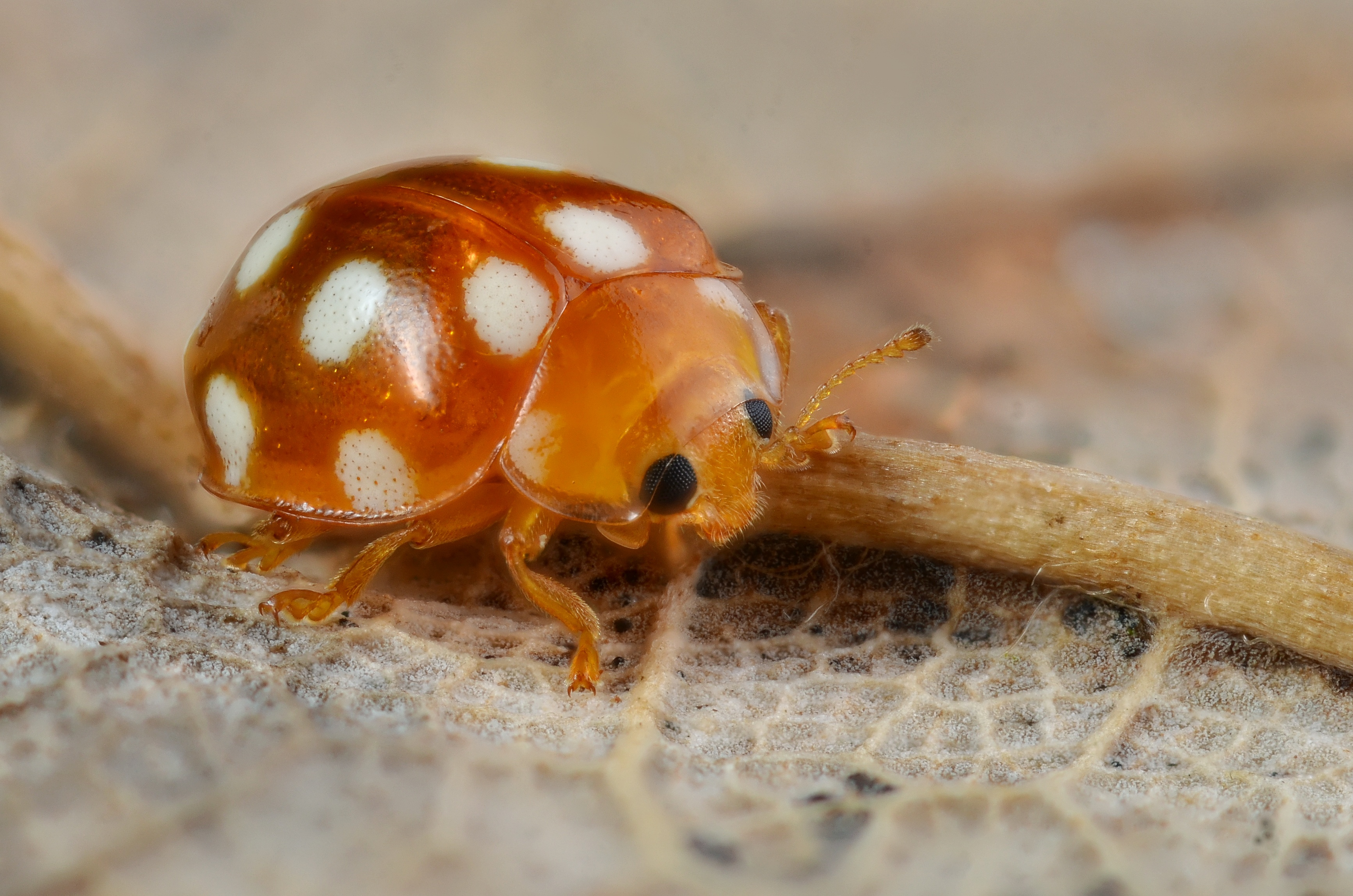
- Lateral view

Scientific classification
- Kingdom: Animalia
- Phylum: Arthropoda
- Clade: Pancrustacea
- Class: Insecta
- Order: Coleoptera
- Suborder: Polyphaga
- Infraorder: Cucujiformia
- Family: Coccinellidae
- Genus: Vibidia
- Species: V. duodecimguttata

Binomial name
- Vibidia duodecimguttata (Poda, 1761)

= Vibidia duodecimguttata =

Species of beetle

Vibidia duodecimguttata, commonly known as the twelve-spotted ladybird beetle, is a species of ladybird beetle belonging to the family Coccinellidae, subfamily Coccinellinae.

== Distribution ==
This species is present in most of Europe, in the eastern Palearctic realm, and in the Near East.

== Description ==
Vibidia duodecimguttata can reach a length of about 4 millimetres (0.16 in). These beetles have an oval shaped body with quite long, light brown antennae. The elytra have a slightly wider side edge. Their entire body has a light brown basic colour on the upper and lower side, only the eyes are black. The elytra show 12 whitish spots, six on each elytron (hence the Latin word duodecimguttata, meaning twelve-spotted as if by drops). There is a whitish spot on both sides of the throat.

This species bears resemblance to Calvia decemguttata and Halyzia sedecimguttata.

== Biology ==
Adults can be encountered from April through September. This beetle is mycophagous, mainly feeding on the powdery mildew which infects certain trees (including oak, hazel and alder).

== Mating behaviour ==
First, the chase is expressed in rapid movements, with the male pausing for a moment at least twice before courtship. Courtship consists of the male mounting the female's elytra and lapping her, turning twice with the aedeagus extended. The mounting lasts approximately one second. During mating, the male, in addition to making body turns, also makes a head protrusion forward and down after the completion of each turn.

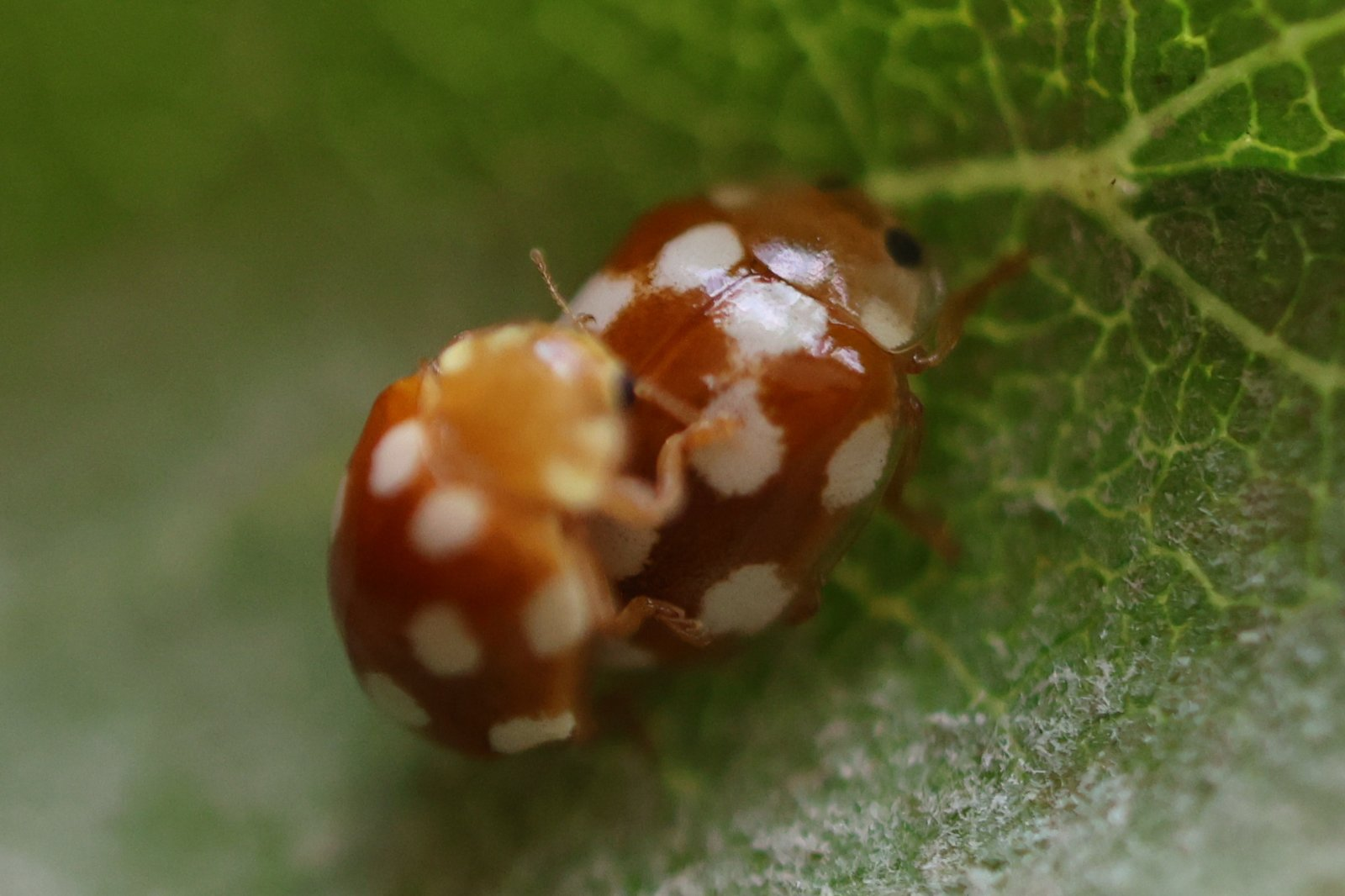
Vibidia duodecimguttata copulation

== Eggs and oviposition ==
The egg laying begins about 1 week after mating. The eggs are similar to those of the 22-spot ladybird, but the green hue on the outer shell is slightly more intense and their tip is more pointed. The eggs are laid in individual clusters.

== Larval stages ==
=== Hatchlings ===
The main colour of the newly hatched larva is transparent grey. The four spots on the first two segments after the pronotum are much larger, compared to the remaining tubercules on the remaining segments. The spots are dark grey, while the abdomen is more elongated even in this instar. The legs are grey exactly like the colour of the body. The tubercular hairs are dark. The head is much darker grey with a light area only in one place between the eyes. The length of the larva is 3.1 mm.

The hatched larva is very opportunistic and moves quickly in exploring the leaf surfaces. The time from hatchling to the first instar is 24 hours.

=== First instar ===
In the first instar the larva elongates a little and turns slightly yellow. The legs become dark grey, and the pronotum fades. The head is darkened and is almost black. The duration of the first stage is two to eight days.

=== Second instar ===
In the second instar, the body reaches 4.5 mm in length and acquires a brighter yellow colour. On the two segments after the pronotum (above the pairs of spots), there is a yellowish shade. The pairs of black spots are limited in size to some hemispherical oval ones. The pronotum is slightly faded. On the forehead between the eyes there is a single dark spot. The head becomes a lighter dark yellow to pale grey colour. The legs are paler and transparent.

=== Third instar ===
After spending three days as a second instar the larvae become third instars. Early in this stage the larva is around 4 mm long, later in this stage it reaches 7 mm. The body now acquires an overall electric green hue, and the two yellow stripes are still in the form of dots on each abdominal segment. In the middle of the pronotum and on the other two segments after it there are 4 adjacent light squares.

=== Fourth instar ===
The fourth instar larva is light yellow-beige with a very faint orange tint. The legs are now the same colour as the body. On the dorsal side of the abdomen on the side there are two pale yellow lines, along with three rows of black spots. The two segments after the pronotum have two pairs of black spots and a few vague shadows. The pronotum is mostly electric yellow and only below it are beige spots. The head is dark beige. Fully grown, the larva is about 17 mm long. The fourth instar stage in this species is very short, lasting only 3 days, before the larva enters a prepupal state under the fungus-infected leaves of trees and tall shrubs.

== Pupa ==
The pupa is pale and creamy yellow in colour. On both sides along the length of the sternites from the fourth to the last there are a number of yellow spots. They do not completely cover the last sixth sternite and only a small gap remains. This species forms its pupae only under leaves infected with powdery mildew.

Life Cycle of Vibidia duodecimguttata
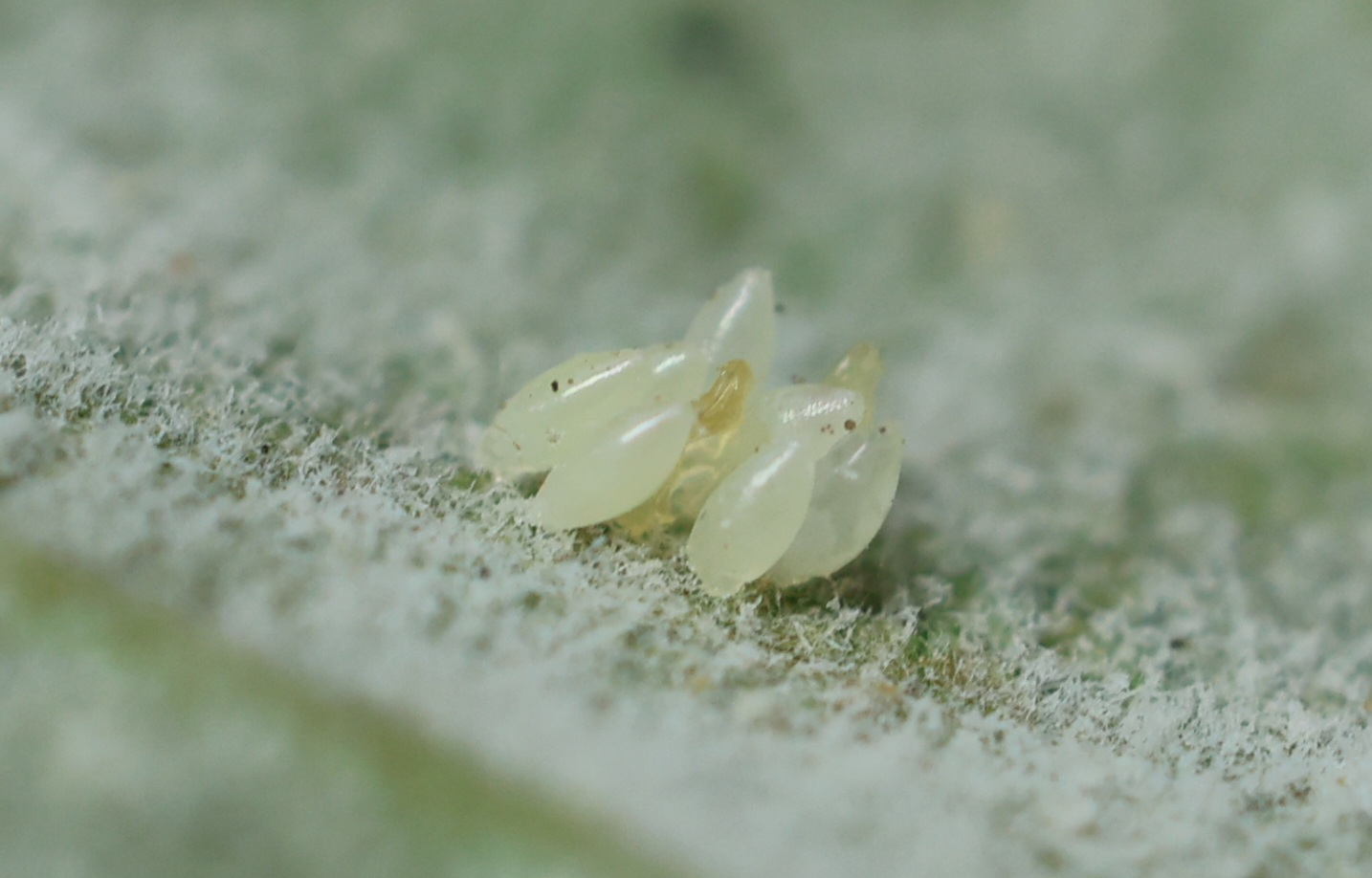
Eggs

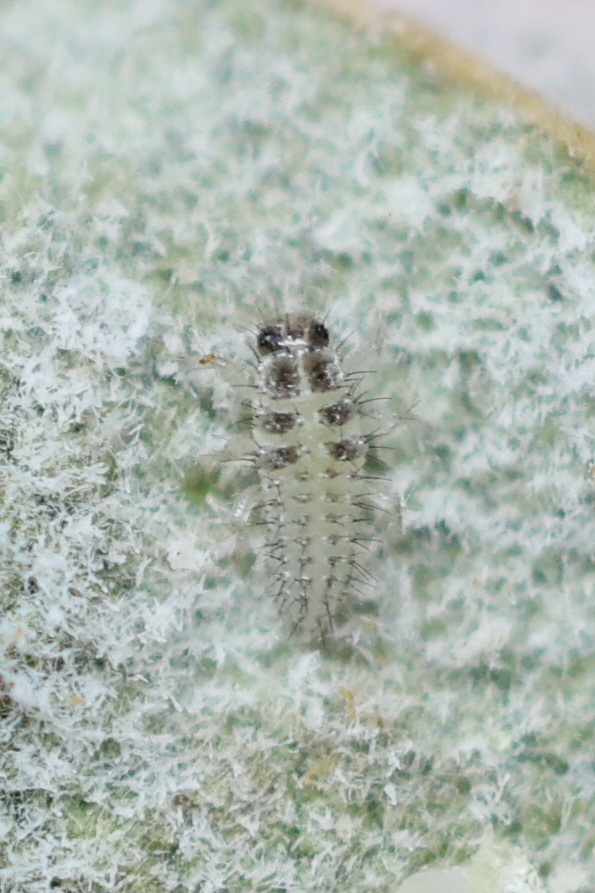
Newly-hatched larva

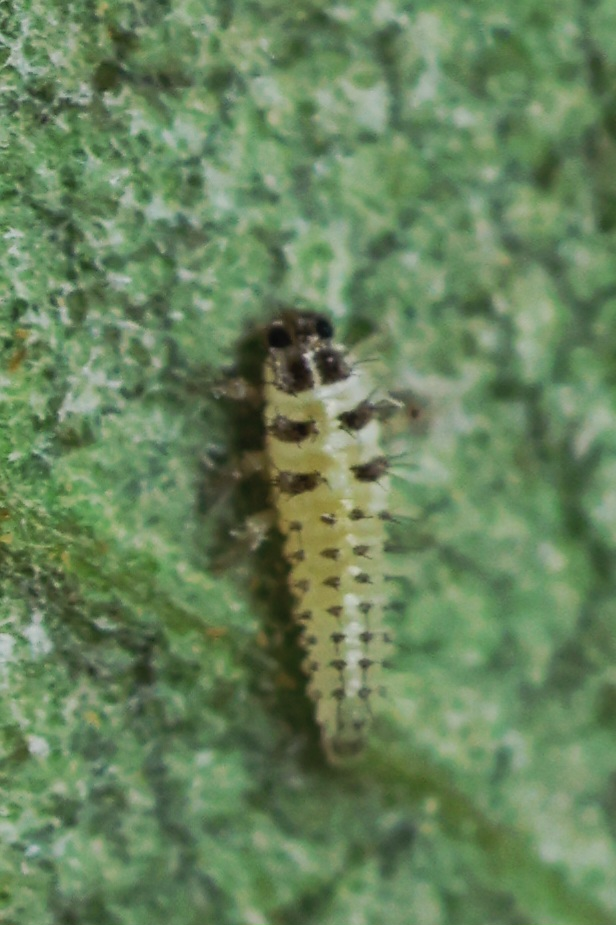
First instar larva

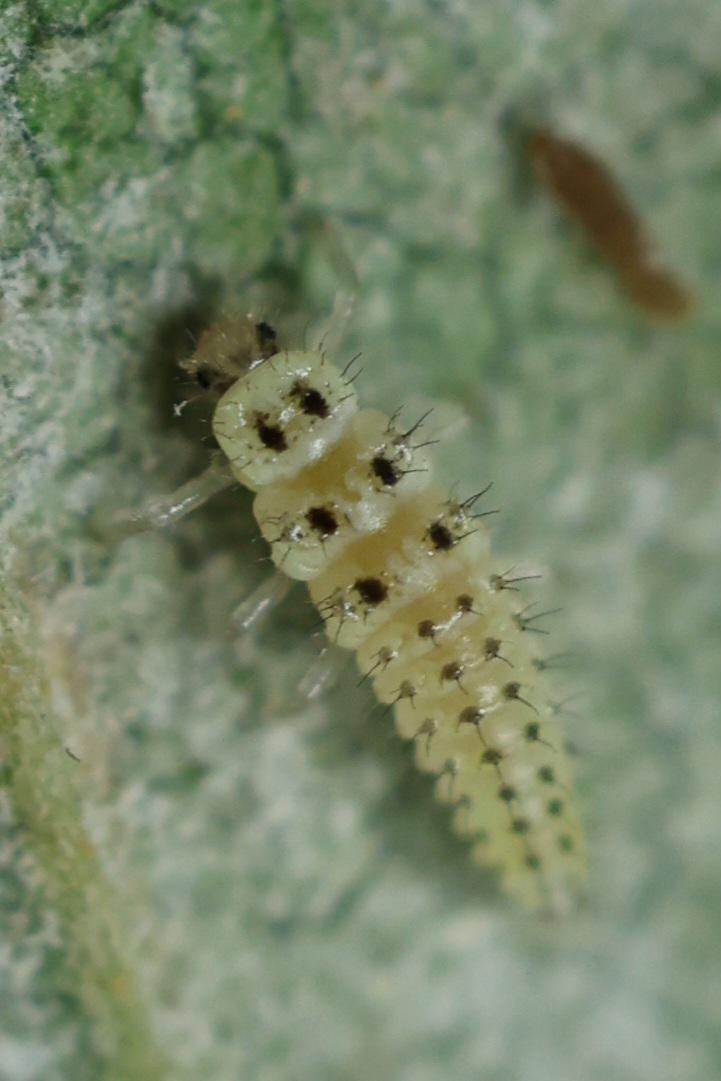
Second instar larva

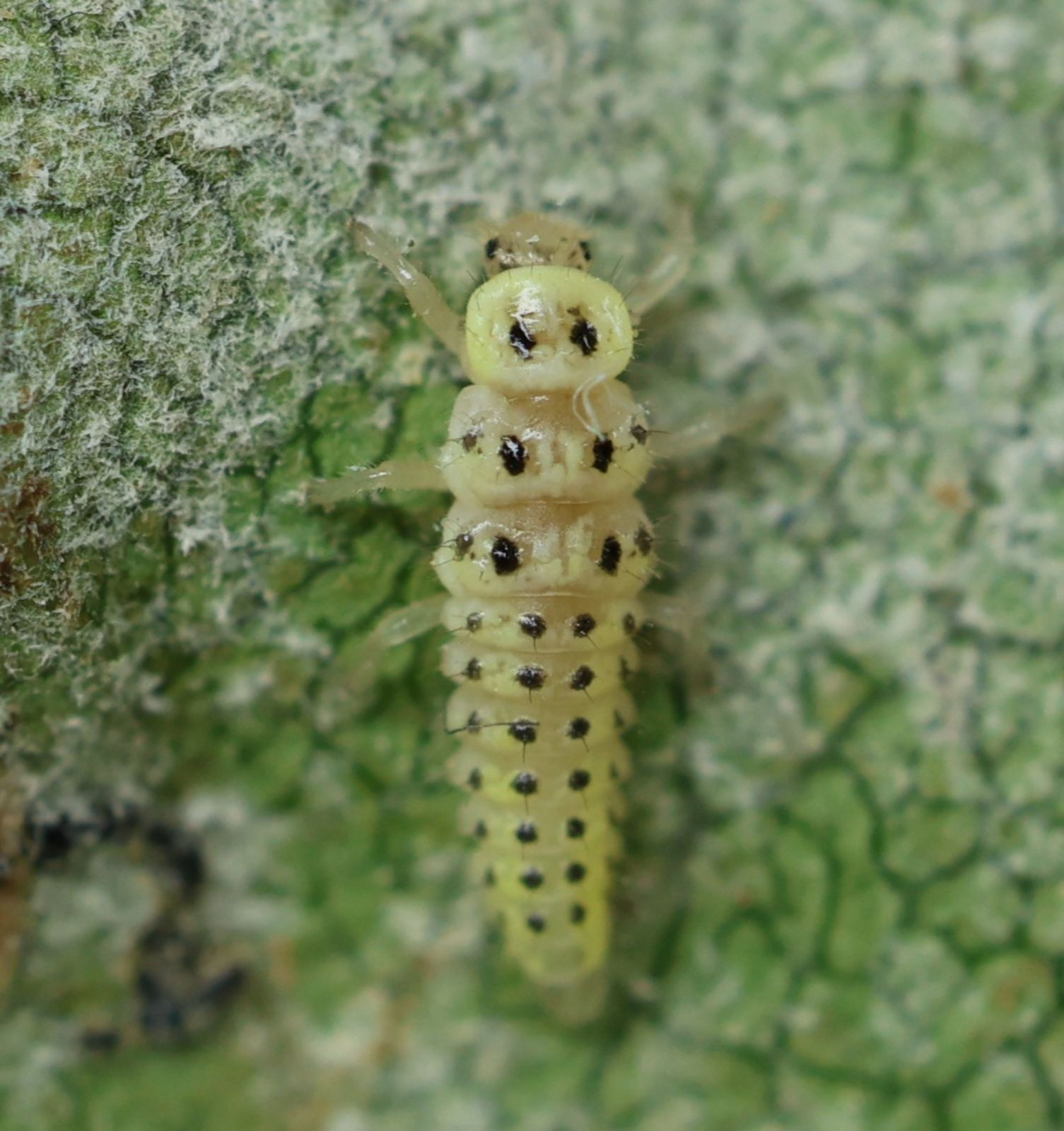
Third instar larva

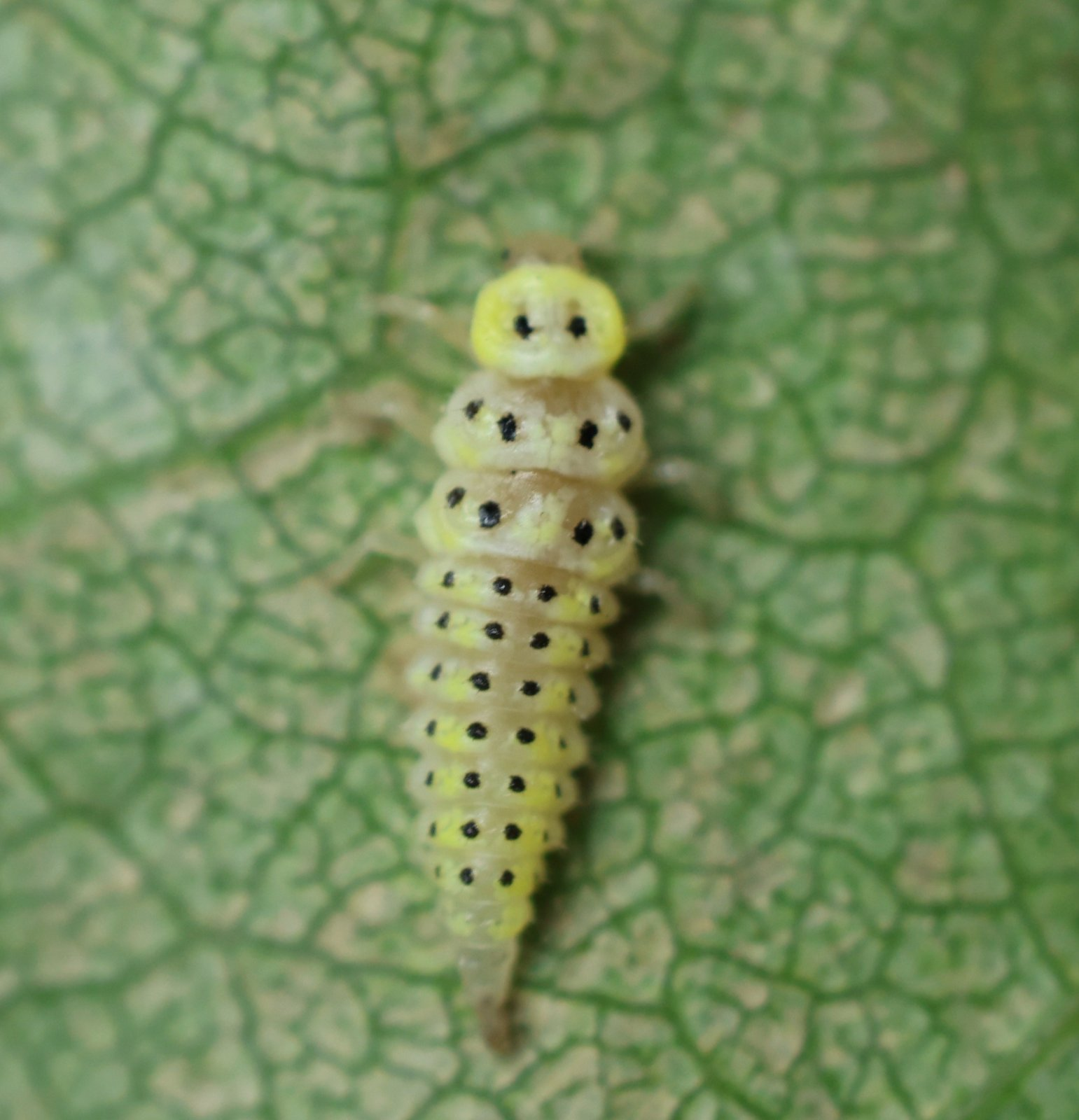
Fourth instar larva

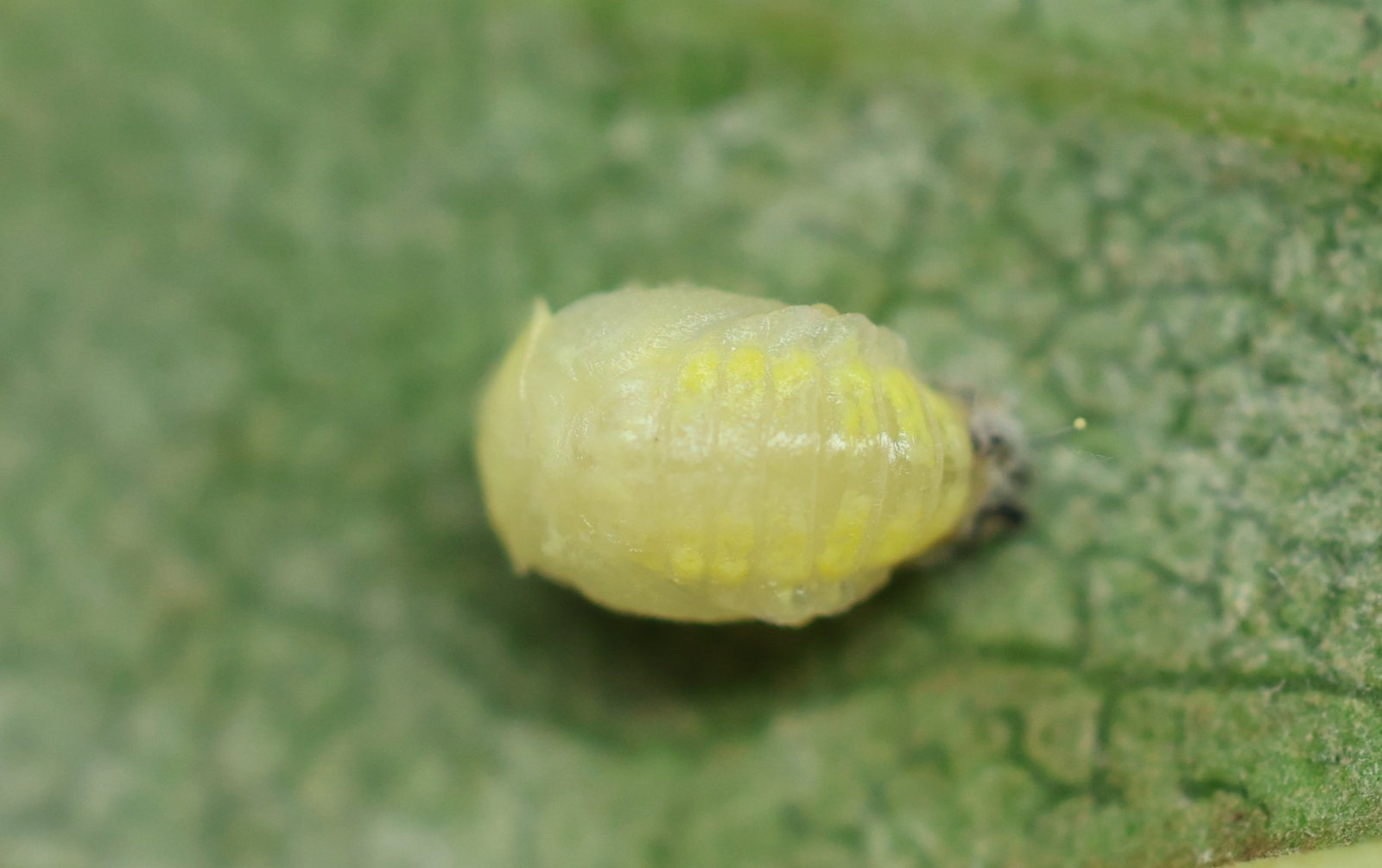
Pupa

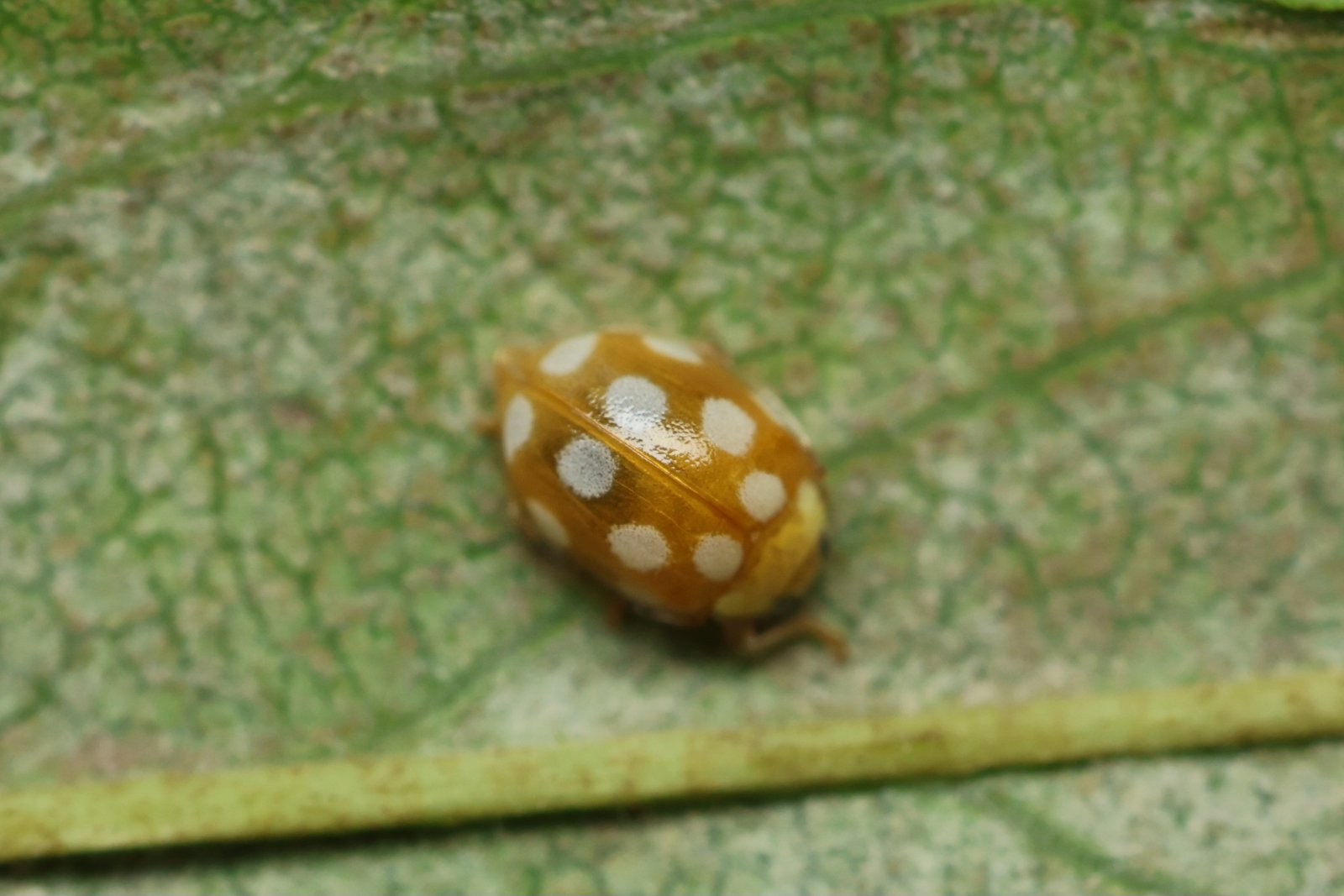
Freshly-emerged adult
