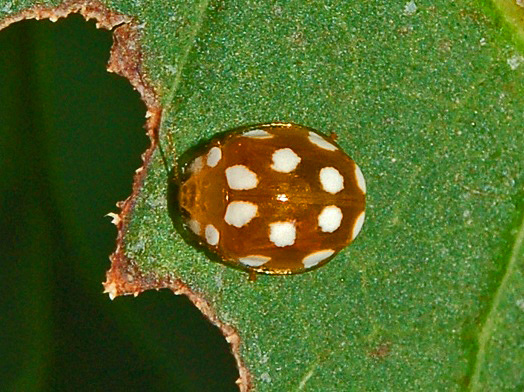
- Vibidia duodecimguttata

Scientific classification
- Kingdom: Animalia
- Phylum: Arthropoda
- Clade: Pancrustacea
- Class: Insecta
- Order: Coleoptera
- Suborder: Polyphaga
- Infraorder: Cucujiformia
- Family: Coccinellidae
- Genus: Vibidia; Mulsant, 1846

= Vibidia =

Genus of beetles

Vibidia is a genus of ladybird beetle belonging to the family Coccinellidae, subfamily Coccinellinae.

== Species ==
- Vibidia duodecimguttata (Poda, 1761)
- Vibidia korschefskii (Mader, 1930)
