= Halyzia nepalensis =

Scientific classification
- Kingdom: Animalia
- Phylum: Arthropoda
- Clade: Pancrustacea
- Class: Insecta
- Order: Coleoptera
- Suborder: Polyphaga
- Infraorder: Cucujiformia
- Family: Coccinellidae
- Genus: Halyzia
- Species: H. nepalensis

Binomial name
- Halyzia nepalensis Canepari, 2003

Species of beetle

Halyzia nepalensis is a species of beetle of the family Coccinellidae. It is found in India (Arunachal Pradesh), Nepal, Bhutan and Myanmar.

== Description ==
Adults reach a length of about 7 mm (0.28 in). They are bright lemon yellow, the pronotum with two brown spots on the posterior margin. The elytra have a sutural stripe and four ochreous to dark reddish brown spots on each elytron. The lateral borders of the pronotum and elytra are transparent.
