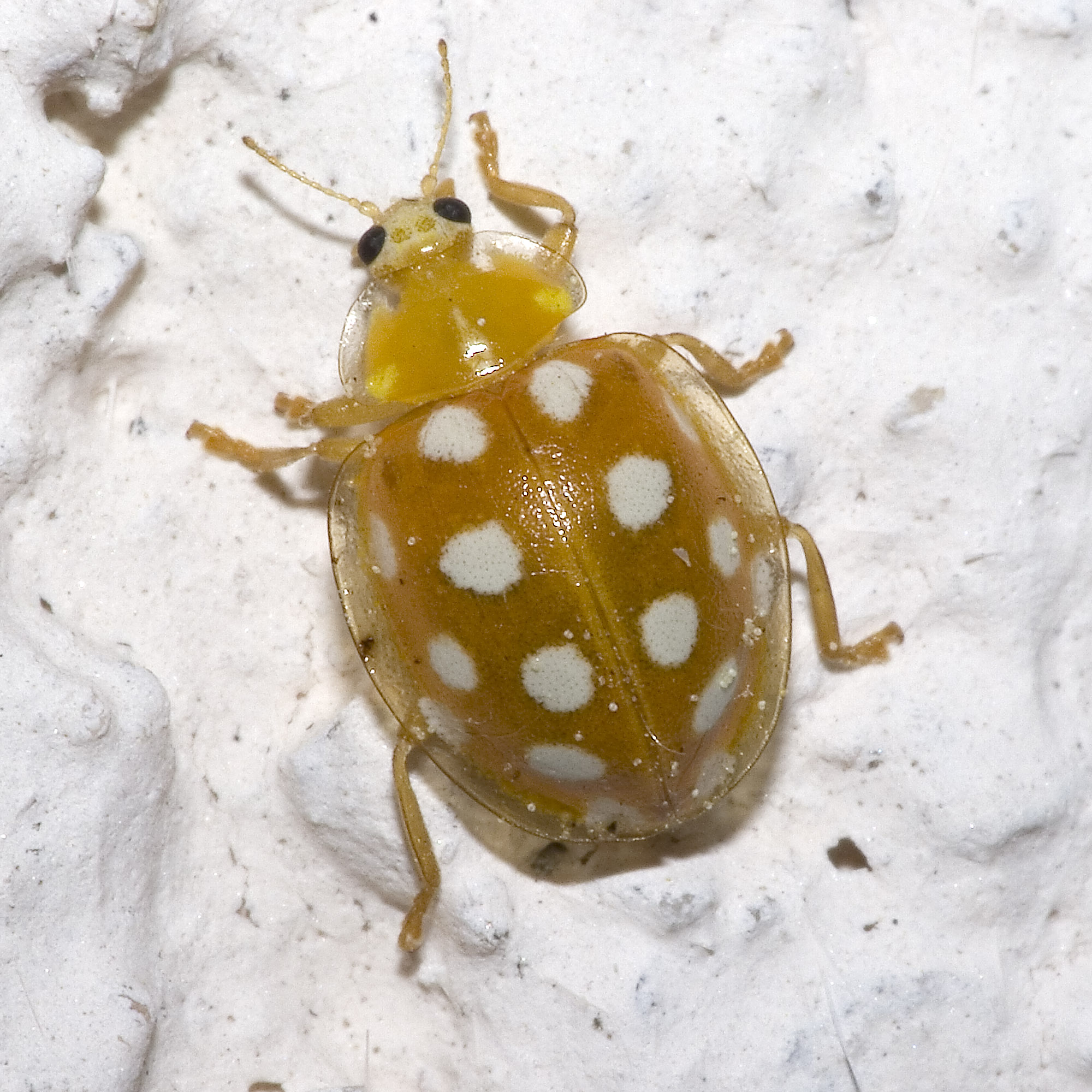

Scientific classification
- Kingdom: Animalia
- Phylum: Arthropoda
- Clade: Pancrustacea
- Class: Insecta
- Order: Coleoptera
- Suborder: Polyphaga
- Infraorder: Cucujiformia
- Family: Coccinellidae
- Genus: Halyzia
- Species: H. sedecimguttata

Binomial name
- Halyzia sedecimguttata (Linnaeus, 1758)

Synonyms
- Coccinella sedecimguttata Linnaeus, 1758; Halyzia pallasii Mulsant, 1850

= Halyzia sedecimguttata =

Species of beetle

Halyzia sedecimguttata, the orange ladybird, is a species of Coccinellidae (ladybirds) family.

H. sedecimguttata in motion

== Distribution ==
Halyzia sedecimguttata is common in Europe, European Russia, the Caucasus, Siberia, the Russian Far East, Belarus, Ukraine, Transcaucasia, Kazakhstan, Asia Minor, Mongolia, Northern China, Japan.

It was formerly uncommon in the Ireland and Britain but the species has established itself over the 20th-century and it is now common in many parts.

== Habitat ==
Common in woodlands, it is more frequent in dry areas, mainly in deciduous woodland (Western European broadleaf forests, Palearctic temperate broadleaf and mixed forest) and in parkland, at forest edges, and on hedges.

== Description ==
Halyzia sedecimguttata can reach a length of 5–6 millimetres (0.20–0.24 in). These beetles have an oval shaped body, rather round than elongated. Compound eyes are black. The antennae are light-brown, quite long and slightly thickened at the end. Their physical appearance is marked by a striking orange colour and the presence of 16 (sometimes less) creamy white large spots on the elytra (eight spots on each elytron). The neck shield usually covers the head and shows orange colored spots. A typical feature is the slightly transparent edges of the elytra. Transparent parts are also present on either side of the neck shield.

This species is rather similar to Calvia decemguttata and Vibidia duodecimguttata.

== Biology ==
Adults are visible from April to October. They spend the winter under the bark of the trees or in the forest litter under fallen leave. Both larvae and adults feed on mildew that infects the leaves of plants and occasionally on small aphids. They mainly feed on Erisyphaceae infesting trees and bushes. In particular, they feed on Phyllactinia guttata and Podosphaera mors-uvae and on aphids present on Quercus robur, Tilia cordata, Ulmus minor, Acer pseudoplatanus, Corylus avellana, Fraxinus excelsior, Alnus viridis, Alnus glutinosa and on coniferous trees.

== Gallery ==
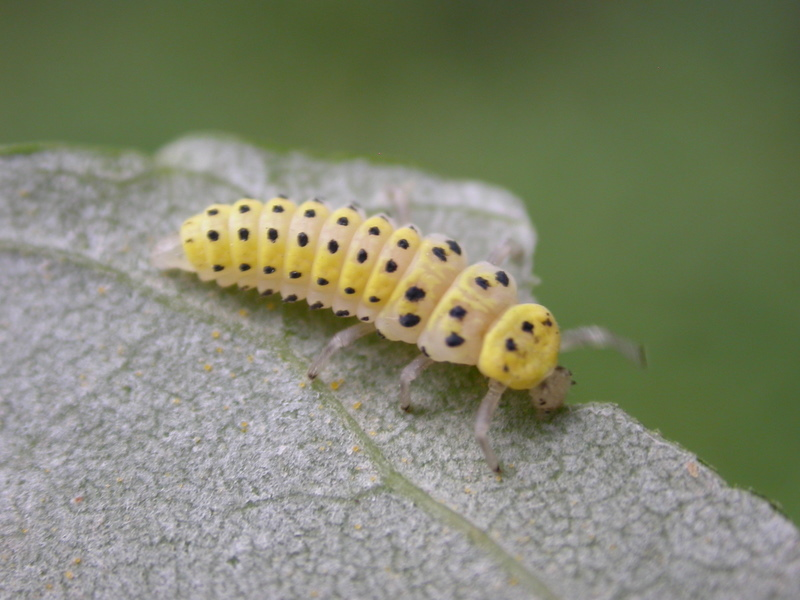
Larva

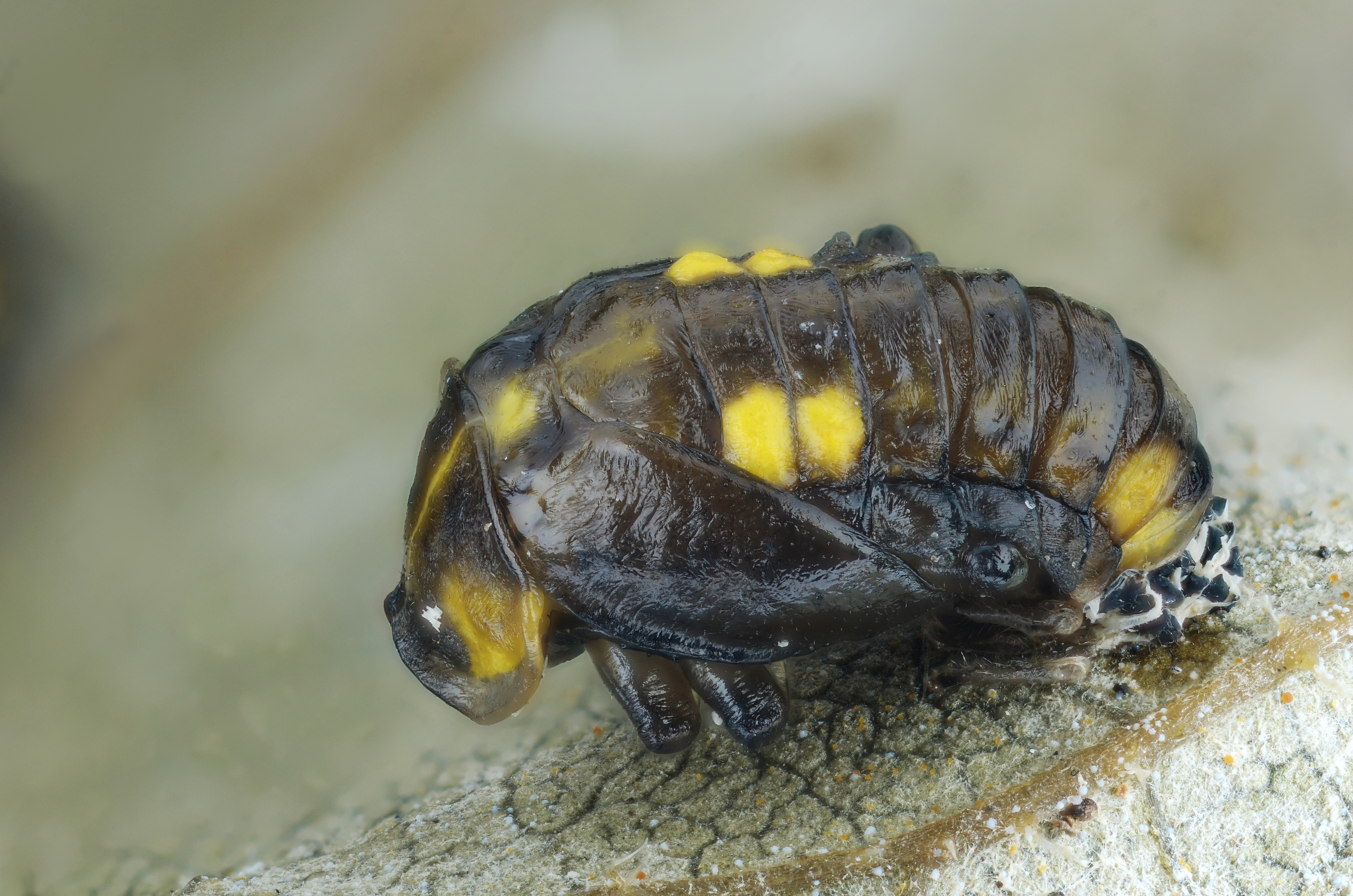
Pupa

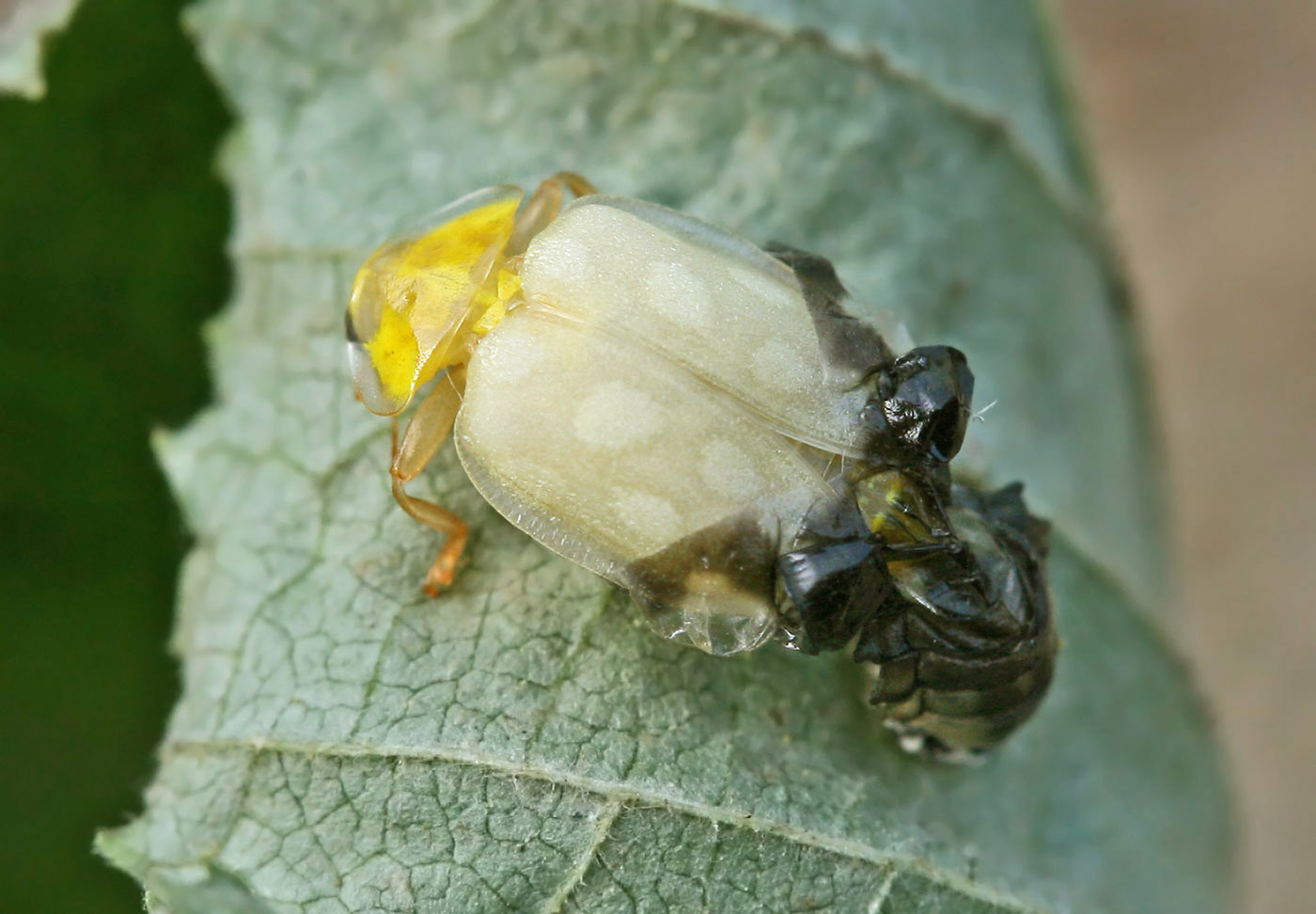
Ecdysis, imago emerging from pupa. The colours will change, when the ladybird hardens.

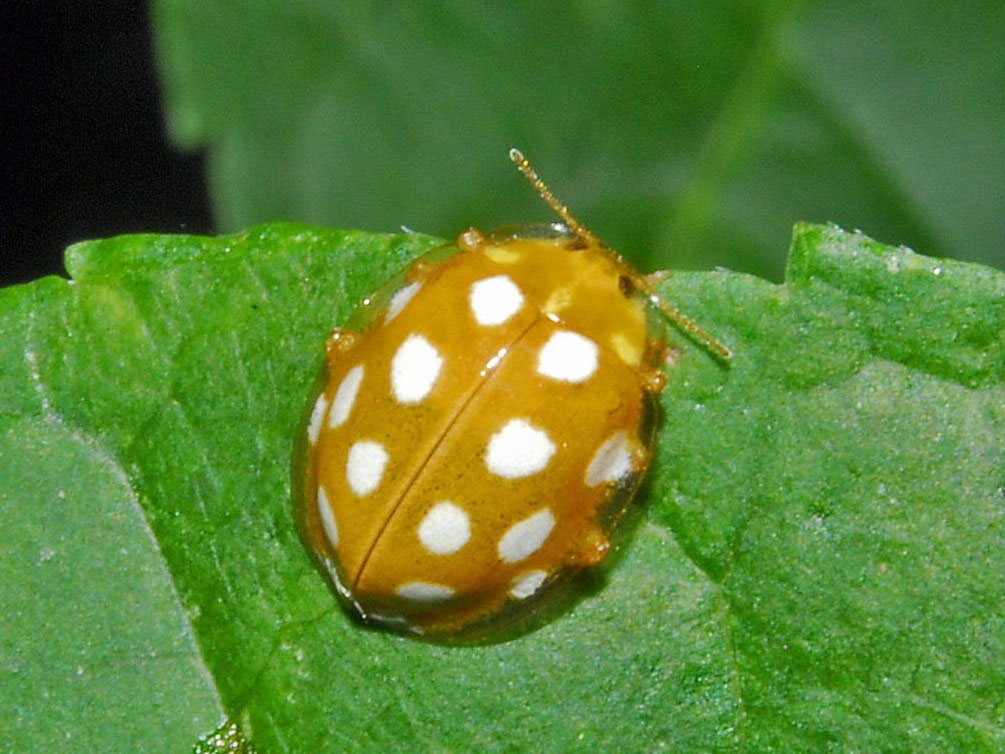
Imago
