= List of Diaspididae genera =

This is a list of genera in the insect family Diaspididae, the armored scales.

== A ==
- Abgrallaspis Balachowsky, 1948
- Acanthaspidiotus Borchsenius & Williams, 1963
- Acanthomytilus Borchsenius, 1947
- Achionaspis Takagi, 1970
- Achorophora Brimblecombe, 1957
- Acontonidia Brimblecombe, 1957
- Acutaspis Ferris, 1941
- Adiscodiaspis Marchal, 1909
- Adiscofiorinia Leonardi, 1906
- Afiorinia Takagi, 1970
- Africaspis MacGillivray, 1921
- Africonidia McKenzie, 1947
- Agrophaspis Borchsenius & Williams, 1963
- Albastaspis MacGillivray, 1921
- Aleucaspis Takagi, 1977
- Alioides Brimblecombe, 1958
- Allantomytilus Leonardi, 1898
- Aloaspis Williams, 1955
- Ambigaspis MacGillivray, 1921
- Amphisoma Takagi, 1995
- Anaimalaia Takagi, 1995
- Anamefiorinia Leonardi, 1906
- Anaspidiotus Borchsenius & Williams, 1963
- Anastomoderma Beardsley, 1966
- Ancepaspis Ferris, 1920
- Andaspis Macgillivray, 1921
- Annulaspis Ferris, 1938
- Anoplaspis Leonardi, 1898
- Anotaspis Ferris, 1941
- Antakaspis Mamet, 1960
- Aonidia Targioni Tozzetti, 1868
- Aonidiella Berlese & Leonardi, 1895
- Aonidomytilus Leonardi, 1903
- Aspidaspis Ferris, 1938
- Aspidiella Leonardi, 1898
- Aspidioides MacGillivray, 1921
- Aspidiotus Bouché 1833
- Aspidonymus Brimblecombe, 1957
- Asymmetraspis MacGillivray, 1921
- Augulaspis MacGillivray, 1921
- Aulacaspis Cockerell, 1893
- Avidovaspis Gerson & Davidson, 1974

== B ==
- Balachowskiella Kaussari, 1955
- Balaspis Hall, 1946
- Banahaoa Takagi, 2003
- Bantudiaspis Hall, 1941
- Benaparlatoria Balachowsky, 1953
- Berlesaspidiotus MacGillivray, 1921
- Berlesaspis MacGillivray, 1921
- Bigymnaspis Balachowsky, 1958

== C ==
- Caia Williams, 1963
- Cameronaspis Takagi, Tho Yow Pong & Khoo Soo Ghee, 1988
- Carulaspis McGillivray, 1921
- Cephalaspidiotus Takagi, 2003
- Chentraspis Leonardi, 1897
- Chimania Munting, 1970
- Chinaspis Gomez-Menor Ortega, 1954
- Chionaspis Signoret, 1869
- Chlidaspis Borkhsenius, 1949
- Chortinaspis Ferris, 1938
- Chrysomphalus Ashmead, 1880
- Circulaspis MacGillivray, 1921
- Clavaspidiotus Takagi & Kawai, 1966
- Clavaspis MacGillivray, 1921
- Coccomytilus Leonardi, 1898
- Comstockiella Cockerell, 1896
- Contigaspis MacGillivray, 1921
- Cooleyaspis MacGillivray, 1921
- Coronaspis MacGillivray, 1921
- Costalimaspis Lepage, 1937
- Crassaspidiotus Takagi, 1969
- Crassaspis Ferris, 1941
- Credodiaspis MacGillivray, 1921
- Crenulaspidiotus MacGillivray, 1921
- Crockeraspis Takagi, 2000
- Cryptaspidiotus Lindinger, 1910
- Cryptaspidus Lindinger, 1910
- Crypthemichionaspis Lindinger, 1911
- Cryptodiaspis Lindinger, 1909
- Cryptoparlatorea Lindinger, 1905
- Cryptoparlatoreopsis Borkhsenius, 1947
- Cryptophyllaspis Cockerell, 1897
- Cryptoselenaspidus
- Cupidaspis MacGillivray, 1921
- Cynodontaspis Takagi, 1962

== D ==
- Dactylaspis Ferris, 1937
- Daraspis Hall, 1946
- Dentachionaspis MacGillivray, 1921
- Dentaspis MacGillivray, 1921
- Diaonidia Takahashi, 1956
- Diaphoraspis Brimblecombe, 1957
- Diaspidiotus Berlese, 1896
- Diaspidistis Hempel, 1900
- Diaspidopus Brimblecombe, 1959
- Diaspis Costa, 1828
- Diastolaspis Brimblecombe, 1959
- Diaulacaspis Takahashi, 1942
- Dichosoma Brimblecombe, 1957
- Dicirculaspis Ben-Dov, 1988
- Diclavaspis Balachowsky, 1956
- Dinaspis Kiaer 1932
- Discodiaspis Koroneos, 1934
- Doriopus Brimblecombe, 1959
- Ductofrontaspis
- Dungunia Takagi, 1993
- Duplachionaspis MacGillivray, 1921
- Duplaspidiotus Macgillivray, 1921
- Duplaspis Goux, 1937
- Dynaspidiotus Thiem & Gerneck, 1934

== E ==
- Emmereziaspis Mamet, 1941
- Entaspidiotus Macgillivray, 1921
- Epidiaspis Cockerell, 1899
- Epifiorinia Takagi, 1970
- Eremiaspis Balachowsky, 1951
- Eucleaspis
- Eudinaspis Lizer y Trelles, 1942
- Eugreeniella Brimblecombe, 1958
- Eulaingia Brimblecombe, 1958
- Eulepidosaphes Borchsenius & Williams, 1963
- Exuviaspis Ferris, 1941

== F ==
- Faureaspis
- Felixiella de Almeida, 1974
- Fernaldanna MacGillivray, 1921
- Ferreroaspis Kozar, 1983
- Ferrisidea Borkhsenius, 1965
- Fijifiorinia
- Finaspis Hall, 1946
- Fiorinia Targioni-Tozzetti, 1869
- Fissuraspis Ferris, 1937
- Formosaspis Takahashi, 1932
- Fraseraspis Takagi, 1999
- Froggattiella Leonardi, 1900
- Fulaspis Balachowsky, 1952
- Furcaspis Lindinger, 1908
- Furchadaspis MacGillivray, 1921

== G ==
- Gadaspis Hall, 1946
- Galeomytilus Takagi, 1995
- Galeraspis Mamet, 1939
- Genistaspis Bodenheimer, 1951
- Geodiaspis Tippins & Howell, 1973
- Getulaspis Balachowsky, 1954
- Gomezmenoraspis Balachowsky, 1953
- Gomphaspidiotus Borchsenius & Williams, 1963
- Gonaspidiotus MacGillivray, 1921
- Gramenaspis Macgillivray, 1921
- Greenaspis Macgillivray, 1921
- Greeniella Cockerell, 1897
- Greenoidea Macgillivray, 1921
- Guineaspis Balachowsky, 1952
- Guizhoaspis Young, 1986
- Gymnaspis Newstead, 1898
- Gynandraspis Balachowsky & Matile-Ferrero, 1980

== H ==
- Haliaspis Takagi, 1963
- Heimaspis Balachowsky & Ferrero, 1967
- Helaspis
- Helenococcus Liu & Howell, 1997
- Hemaspidis Macgillivray, 1921
- Hemiberlesia Leonardi, 1897
- Hemigymnaspis
- Hovaspis Mamet, 1954
- Howardia Berlese & Leonardi, 1896
- Hulaspis Hall, 1946
- Hybridaspis Green, 1926
- Hypaspidiotus Takahashi, 1956

== I-J-K ==
- Icaraspidiotus Takagi, 2000
- Ichthyaspis Takagi, 1970
- Imerinaspis Mamet, 1954
- Inchoaspis Macgillivray, 1921
- Incisaspis
- Ischnafiorinia Macgillivray, 1921
- Ischnaspis Douglas, 1887
- Kandraspis Mamet, 1960
- Kochummenaspis Takagi, 2003
- Koroneaspis Bodenheimer, 1943
- Kuwanaspis Macgillivray, 1921
- Kyphosoma Takagi, 1993

== L ==
- Labidaspis Borchsenius & Williams, 1963
- Laingaspis Borchsenius & Williams, 1963
- Lapazia Ferris, 1937
- Ledaspis Hall, 1946
- Leonardaspis Macgillivray, 1921
- Leonardianna Macgillivray, 1921
- Lepidosaphes Shimer, 1868
- Leucaspis Signoret, 1869
- Ligaspis Takagi, 2002
- Lindingaspis MacGillivray, 1921
- Lindingeria Macgillivray, 1921
- Lineaspis MacGillivray, 1921
- Lopholeucaspis Balachowsky, 1953
- Loranthaspis Cockerell & Bueker, 1930

== M ==
- Madagaspis Mamet, 1950
- Madaparlaspis Mamet, 1962
- Magnospinus Munting, 1970
- Malleolaspis Ferris, 1941
- Mammata Munting, 1969
- Mancaspis Ferris, 1941
- Marchalaspis Macgillivray, 1921
- Marginaspis Hall, 1946
- Maskellanna Macgillivray, 1921
- Maskellia Fuller, 1897
- Mauritiaspis Mamet, 1939
- Medangaspis Takagi, 1999
- Megacanthaspis Takagi, 1961
- Megaspidiotus Brimblecombe, 1955
- Melanaspis Cockerell, 1897
- Melayumytilus Takagi, 1992
- Mempelaspis Takagi, 2000
- Mercetaspis Gomez-Menor Ortega, 1927
- Mesoselenaspidus Pinto da Fonseca, 1970
- Metandaspis Williams, 1963
- Microparlatoria Takahashi, 1956
- Mimeraspis Brimblecombe, 1957
- Mimusaspis Mamet, 1942
- Mitraspis Ferris, 1941
- Mitulaspis Macgillivray, 1921
- Mixaspis Takahashi, 1932
- Mohelnaspis Sulc, 1937
- Monaonidiella Macgillivray, 1921
- Mongrovaspis Bodenheimer, 1951
- Moraspis Hall, 1946
- Morganella Cockerell, 1897
- Multispinaspis Munting, 1969
- Murataspis Balachowsky & Richardeau, 1942
- Mycetaspis Cockerell, 1897
- Myrtaspis Takagi, 1999
- Myrtophila Brimblecombe, 1957

== N ==
- Namaquea Munting, 1969
- Namibia Munting, 1969
- Narayansaspis
- Neochionaspis Borkhsenius, 1947
- Neoclavaspis Brimblecombe, 1959
- Neoischnaspis Pinto da Fonseca, 1970
- Neoleonardia Macgillivray, 1921
- Neoleucaspis Green, 1926
- Neomorgania MacGillivray, 1921
- Neoparlaspis Hempel, 1934
- Neoparlatoria Takahashi, 1931
- Neopinnaspis McKenzie, 1949
- Neoquernaspis Howell & Takagi, 1981
- Neoselenaspidus Mamet, 1958
- Neparla Takagi, 1987
- Nicholiella Ferris, 1941
- Nigridiaspis Ferris, 1941
- Nikkoaspis Kuwana, 1928
- Nimbaspis Balachowsky, 1952
- Niveaspis MacGillivray, 1921
- Notandaspis Williams & Brookes, 1995
- Nudachaspis Macgillivray, 1921

== O ==
- Obtusaspis Macgillivray, 1921
- Oceanaspidiotus Takagi, 1984
- Octaspidiotus MacGillivray, 1921
- Odonaspis Leonardi, 1897
- Operculaspis Laing, 1925
- Opuntiaspis Cockerell, 1899
- Osiraspis Hall, 1923

== P ==
- Palauaspis Beardsley, 1966
- Palinaspis Ferris, 1941
- Pallulaspis Ferris, 1937
- Pandanaspis Mamet, 1967
- Parachionaspis Macgillivray, 1921
- Paradiaspis Lahille, 1919
- Paraepidiaspis Balachowsky, 1954
- Parafiorinia Macgillivray, 1921
- Paraleucaspis Mamet, 1954
- Parandaspis Mamet, 1967
- Paranewsteadia Macgillivray, 1921
- Paraonidia Macgillivray, 1921
- Paraonidiella Macgillivray, 1921
- Parapandanaspis Mamet, 1967
- Paraparlagena Mamet, 1960
- Paraselenaspidus Mamet, 1958
- Parlagena McKenzie, 1945
- Parlaspis McKenzie, 1945
- Parlatoreopsis Lindinger, 1912
- Parlatoria Targioni-Tozzetti, 1868
- Parrottia Macgillivray, 1921
- Pelliculaspis Ferris, 1941
- Pentacicola Takagi, 1993
- Phaspis Ben-Dov, 1974
- Phaulaspis Leonardi, 1897
- Phaulomytilus Leonardi, 1898
- Pinnaspis Cockerell, 1892
- Poliaspis Maskell, 1880
- Poliaspoides MacGillivray, 1921
- Porogymnaspis Green, 1916
- Praecocaspis Ferris, 1942
- Primaspis Richter & Richter 1917
- Proceraspis Macgillivray, 1921
- Prodiaspis Young, 1984
- Prodigiaspis Ferris, 1941
- Protancepaspis Borkhsenius & Bushchik, 1959
- Protargionia Leonardi, 1911
- Protodiaspis Cockerell, 1898
- Pseudaonidia Cockerell, 1897
- Pseudaulacaspis Macgillivray, 1921
- Pseudischnaspis Hempel, 1900
- Pseudodiaspis Cockerell, 1897
- Pseudoleucaspis Mamet, 1939
- Pseudoparlatoria Cockerell, 1892
- Pseudoselenaspidus Fonseca, 1962
- Pseudotargionia Lindinger, 1912
- Pudaspis
- Pygalataspis Ferris, 1921
- Pygidiaspis Macgillivray, 1921

== Q-R ==
- Quernaspis Ferris, 1937
- Radionaspis Ferris, 1942
- Ramachandraspis Prabhaker Rao, 1953
- Reclavaspis Komosinska, 1965
- Relhaniaspis Munting, 1970
- Remotaspidiotus Macgillivray, 1921
- Rhizaspidiotus MacGillivray, 1921
- Rolaspis Hall, 1946
- Rugaspidiotinus Balachowsky, 1953
- Rugaspidiotus MacGillivray, 1921
- Rugpapuaspis Ben-Dov, 1991
- Rungaspis Balachowsky, 1949
- Rutherfordia MacGillivray, 1921

== S ==
- Sadaotakagia Ben-Dov, 2003
- Saharaspis Balachowsky, 1951
- Sakalavaspis Mamet, 1954
- Sakaramyaspis Mamet, 1954
- Salaspis Hall, 1946
- Salicicola Lindinger, 1905
- Saotomaspis Balachowsky, 1973
- Schizaspis Cockerell & Robinson, 1915
- Schizentaspidus Mamet, 1958
- Scleromytilus Hall, 1946
- Sclopetaspis Macgillivray, 1921
- Scrupulaspis Macgillivray, 1921
- Scytalaspis Ferris, 1955
- Selenaspidopsis Nakahara, 1984
- Selenaspidus Cockerell, 1897
- Selenediella Mamet, 1958
- Selenomphalus Mamet, 1958
- Semelaspidus Macgillivray, 1921
- Separaspis Macgillivray, 1921
- Serrachionaspis Young, 1986
- Serrataspis Ferris, 1955
- Shansiaspis Tang, 1981
- Silvestraspis Bellio, 1929
- Sinistraspis Macgillivray, 1921
- Sinoquernaspis Takagi & Tang, 1982
- Sishanaspis Ferris, 1952
- Situlaspis Macgillivray, 1921
- Smilacicola Takagi, 1969
- Spinaspidiotus Macgillivray, 1921
- Stramenaspis Ferris, 1937
- Stringaspidiotus Macgillivray, 1921
- Sudanaspis
- Symeria Green, 1928

== T ==
- Taiwanaspidiotus Takagi, 1969
- Takahashiaspis Takagi, 1961
- Tamilparla Takagi, 1987
- Tamuraspis Takagi, 1989
- Tanaparlatoria Mamet, 1962
- Targionia Signoret, 1868
- Tecaspis Hall, 1946
- Tenuiaspis MacGillivray, 1921
- Thoa Takagi, 1993
- Thysanaspis Ferris, 1955
- Thysanofiorinia Balachowsky, 1954
- Tollaspidiotus MacGillivray, 1921
- Triaspidis MacGillivray, 1921
- Trichomytilus Leonardi, 1898
- Triraphaspis Balachowsky, 1954
- Trischnaspis Ben-Dov, 1974
- Trullifiorinia Leonardi, 1906
- Tsimanaspis Mamet, 1960
- Tsimbazaspis Mamet, 1962
- Tulefiorinia Mammet, 1960

== U-V-W-X-Y-Z ==
- Ulucoccus Takagi, Tho & Khoo, 1990
- Umbaspis MacGillivray, 1921
- Unachionaspis MacGillivray, 1921
- Unaspidiotus MacGillivray, 1921
- Unaspis MacGillivray, 1921
- Ungulaspis MacGillivray, 1921
- Varicaspis MacGillivray, 1921
- Velataspis Ferris, 1937
- Vinculaspis Ferris, 1942
- Voraspis Hall, 1946
- Xanthophthalma Cockerell & Parrott, 1899
- Xerophilaspis Cockerell, 1897
- Xiphuraspis Borchsenius & Williams, 1963
- Yomaspis
- Yuanaspis Young, 1986
- Yunnanaspis Chang 1966
