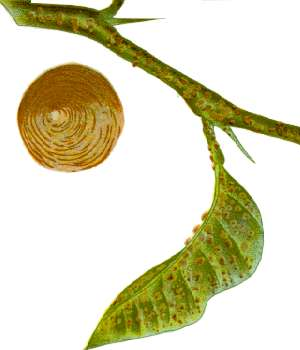
- Aspidiotus nerii oleander scale

Scientific classification
- Kingdom: Animalia
- Phylum: Arthropoda
- Class: Insecta
- Order: Hemiptera
- Suborder: Sternorrhyncha
- Family: Diaspididae
- Subfamily: Aspidiotinae
- Tribe: Aspidiotini
- Subtribe: Aspidiotina

= Aspidiotina =

Subtribe of true bugs

Aspidiotina is a subtribe of armored scale insects.

== Genera ==
- Acutaspis
- Affirmaspis
- Aonidiella
- Aspidaspis
- Aspidioides
- Aspidiotus
- Avidovaspis
- Banahaoa
- Cephalaspidiotus
- Chemnaspidiotus
- Chentraspis
- Chinaspis
- Chortinaspis
- Chrysomphalus
- Clavaspidiotus
- Clavaspis
- Crenulaspidiotus
- Cryptophyllaspsis
- Diaspidiotus
- Diclavaspis
- Dynaspidiotus
- Ephedraspis
- Gonaspidiotus
- Greenoidea
- Helaspis
- Hemiberlesia
- Hypaspidiotus
- Lindingaspis
- Loranthaspis
- Marginaspis
- Megaspidiotus
- Melanaspis
- Metaspidiotus
- Monaonidiella
- Morganella
- Murataspis
- Mycetaspis
- Neoclavaspis
- Neoleonardia
- Nigridiaspis
- Nuculaspis
- Obtusaspis
- Octaspidiotus
- Palinaspis
- Phaspis
- Pseudischnaspis
- Pseudomelanaspis
- Pygidiaspis
- Reclavaspis
- Rungaspis
- Saharaspis
- Sakalavaspis
- Schizaspis
- Spinaspidiotus
- Sudanaspis
- Taiwanaspidiotus
- Temnaspidiotus
- Tsimanaspis
- Tsugaspidiotus
- Unaspidiotus
- Varicaspis
