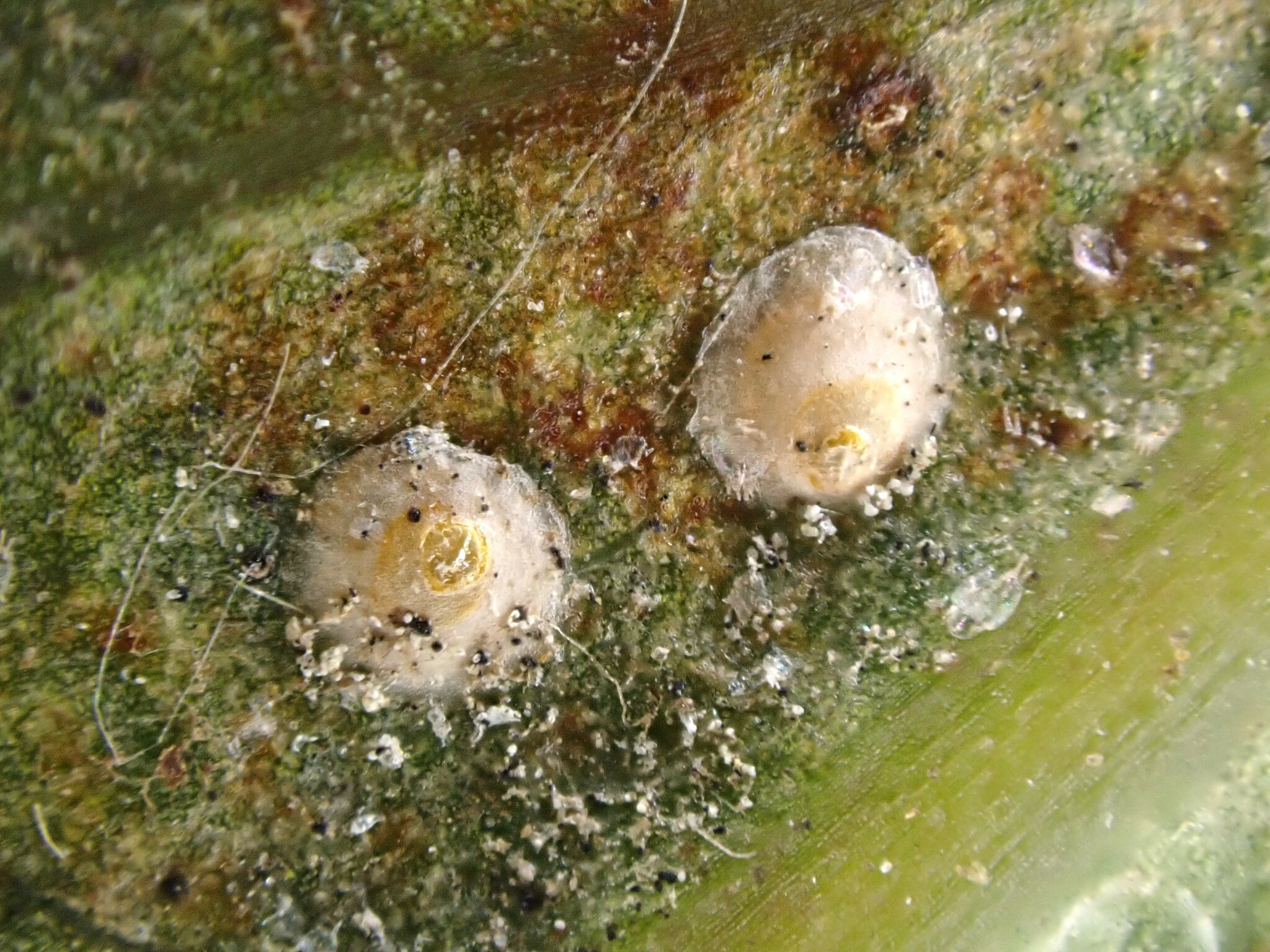
- Aspidiotus nerii, oleander scale, New Zealand

Scientific classification
- Domain: Eukaryota
- Kingdom: Animalia
- Phylum: Arthropoda
- Class: Insecta
- Order: Hemiptera
- Suborder: Sternorrhyncha
- Family: Diaspididae
- Subfamily: Aspidiotinae
- Tribe: Aspidiotini; Westwood

= Aspidiotini =

Tribe of true bugs

Aspidiotini is a tribe in the armored scale insect family Diaspididae. They are found worldwide.

== Gallery ==
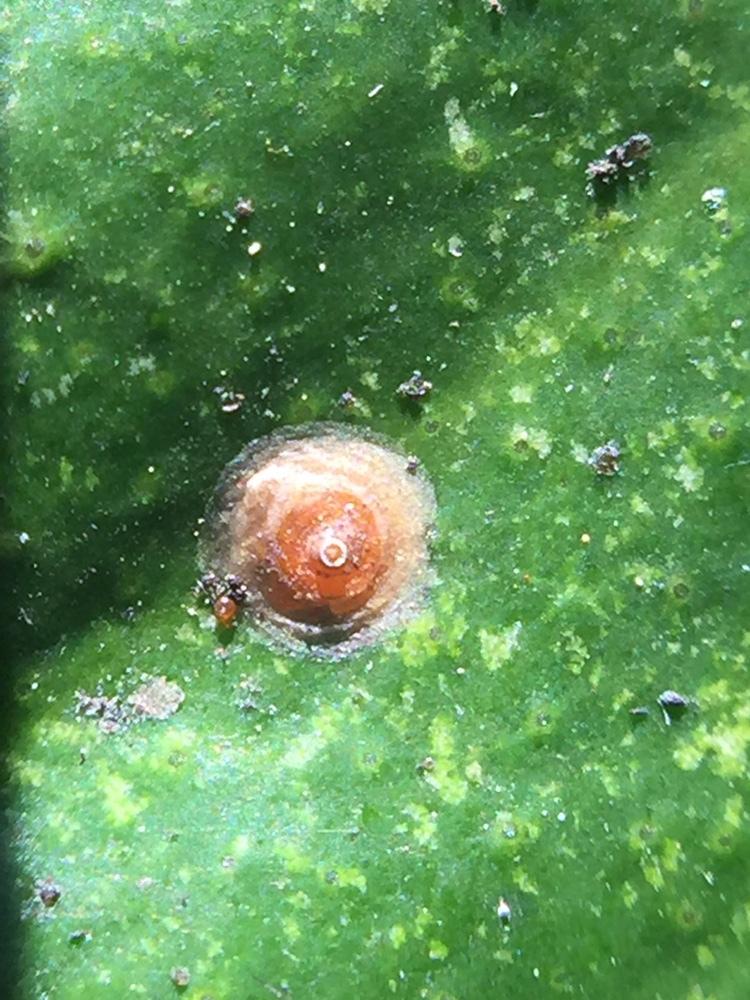
Aonidiella aurantii, California red scale, New Zealand

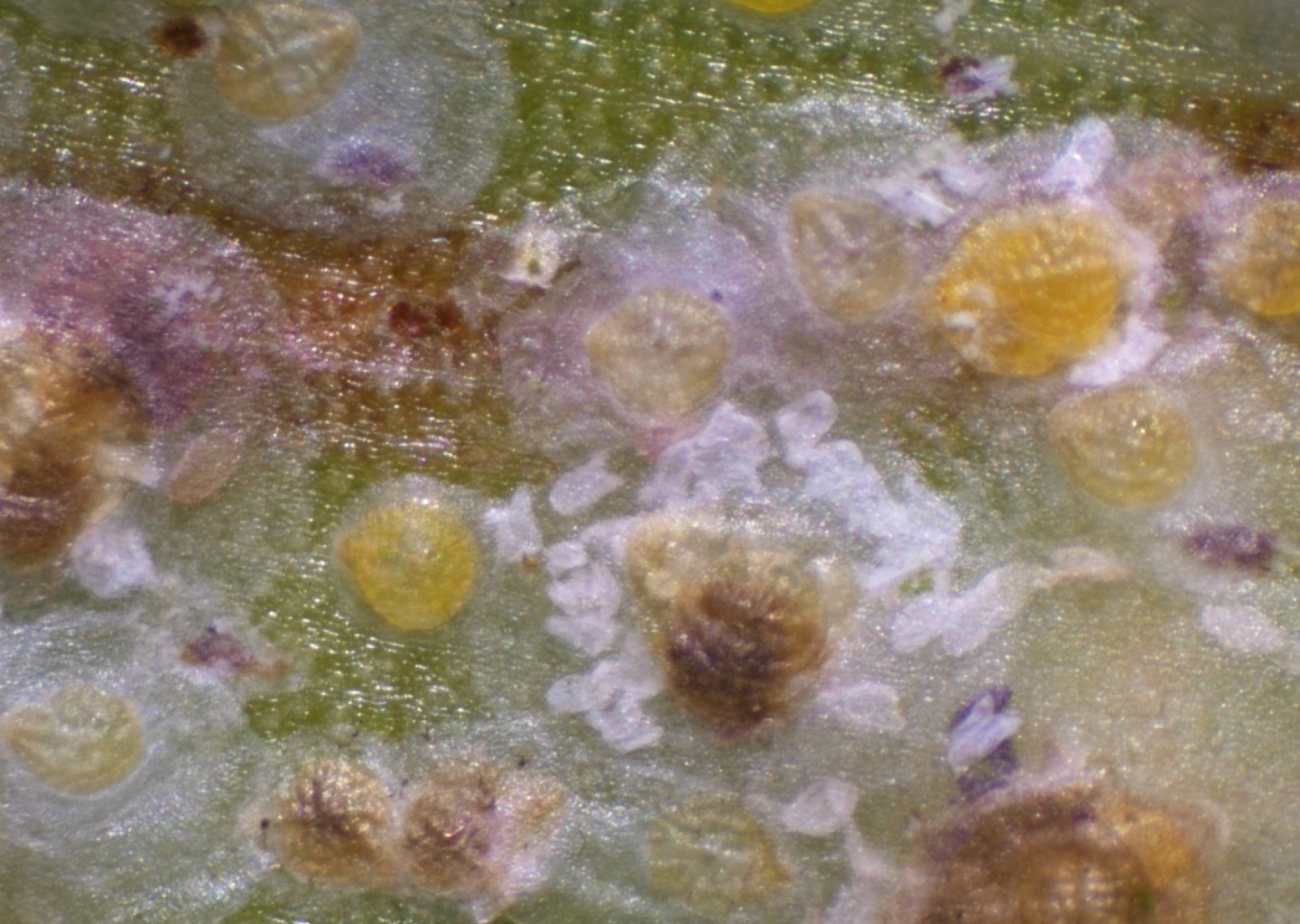
Aspidiotus destructor, coconut scale, Cook Islands

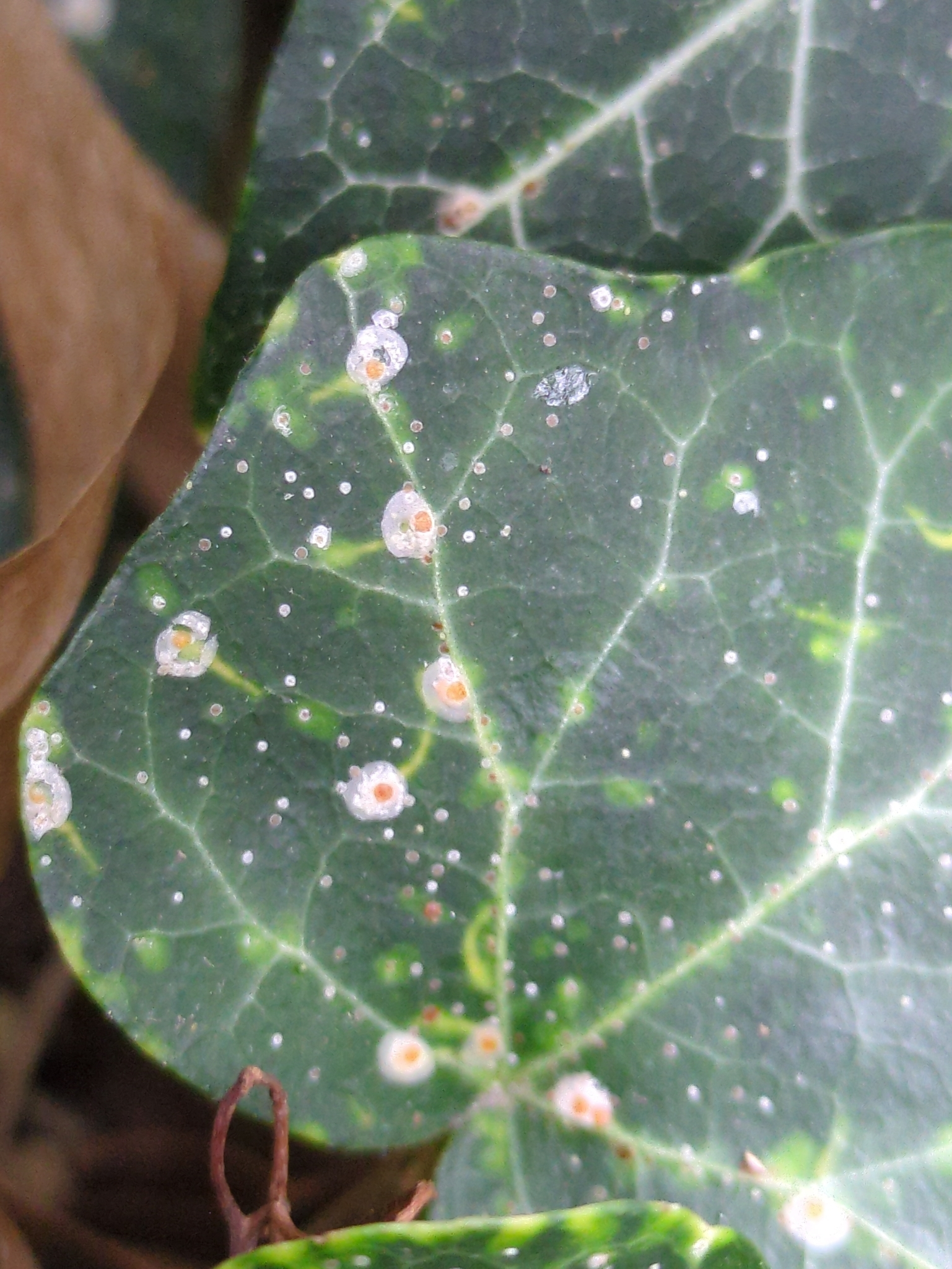
Aspidiotus hedericola, Germany

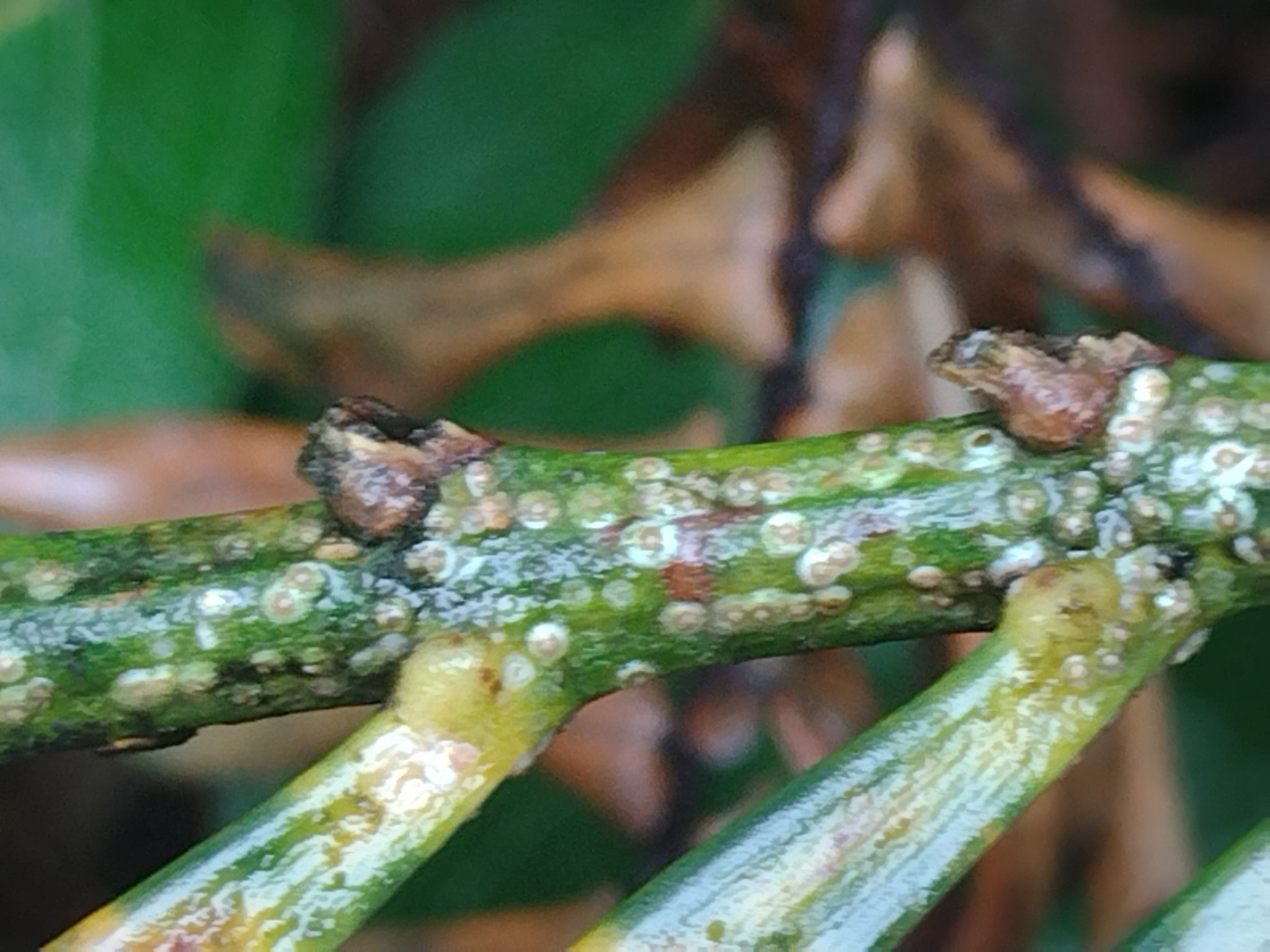
Aspidiotus murramarangensis, Australia

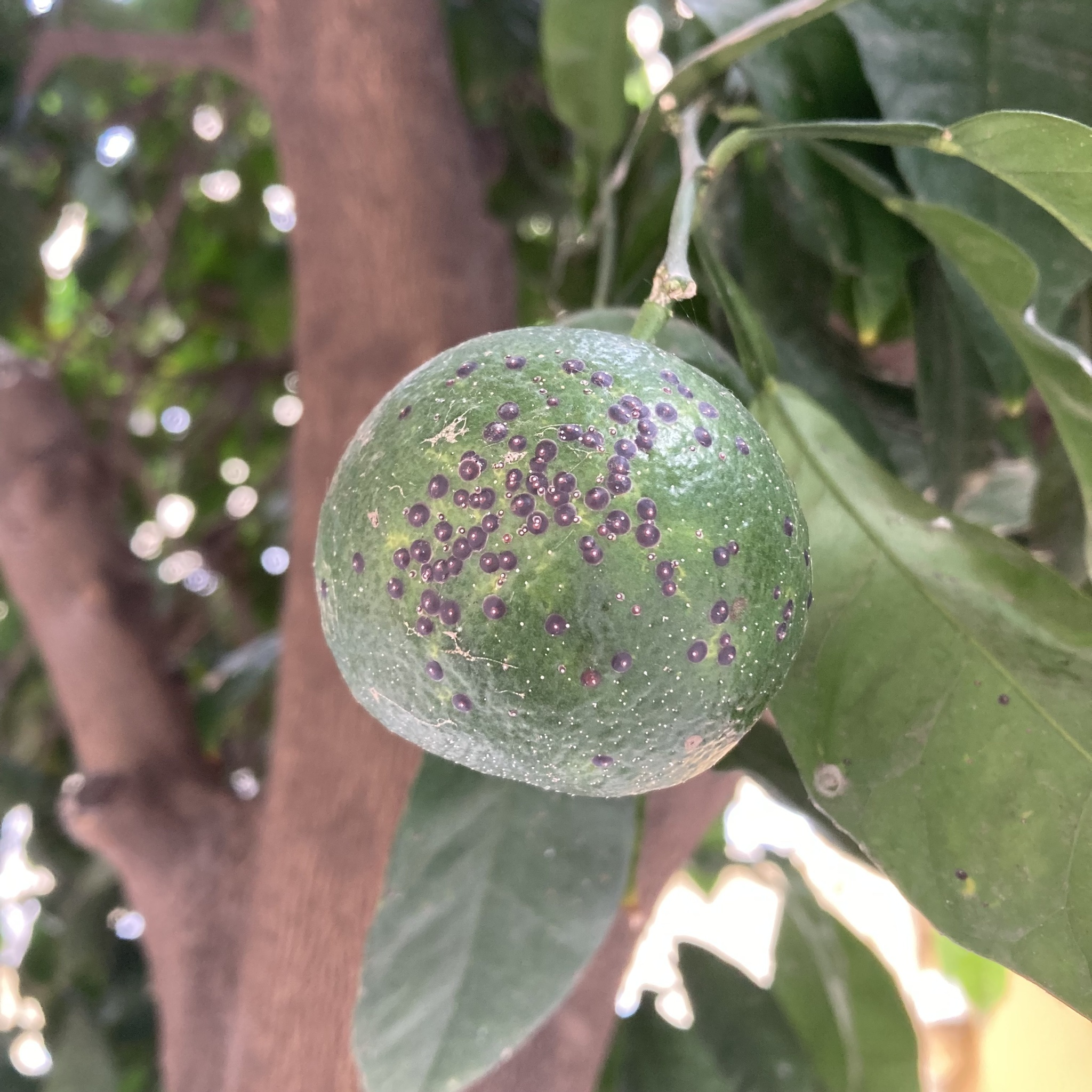
Chrysomphalus aonidum, Florida red scale, Spain

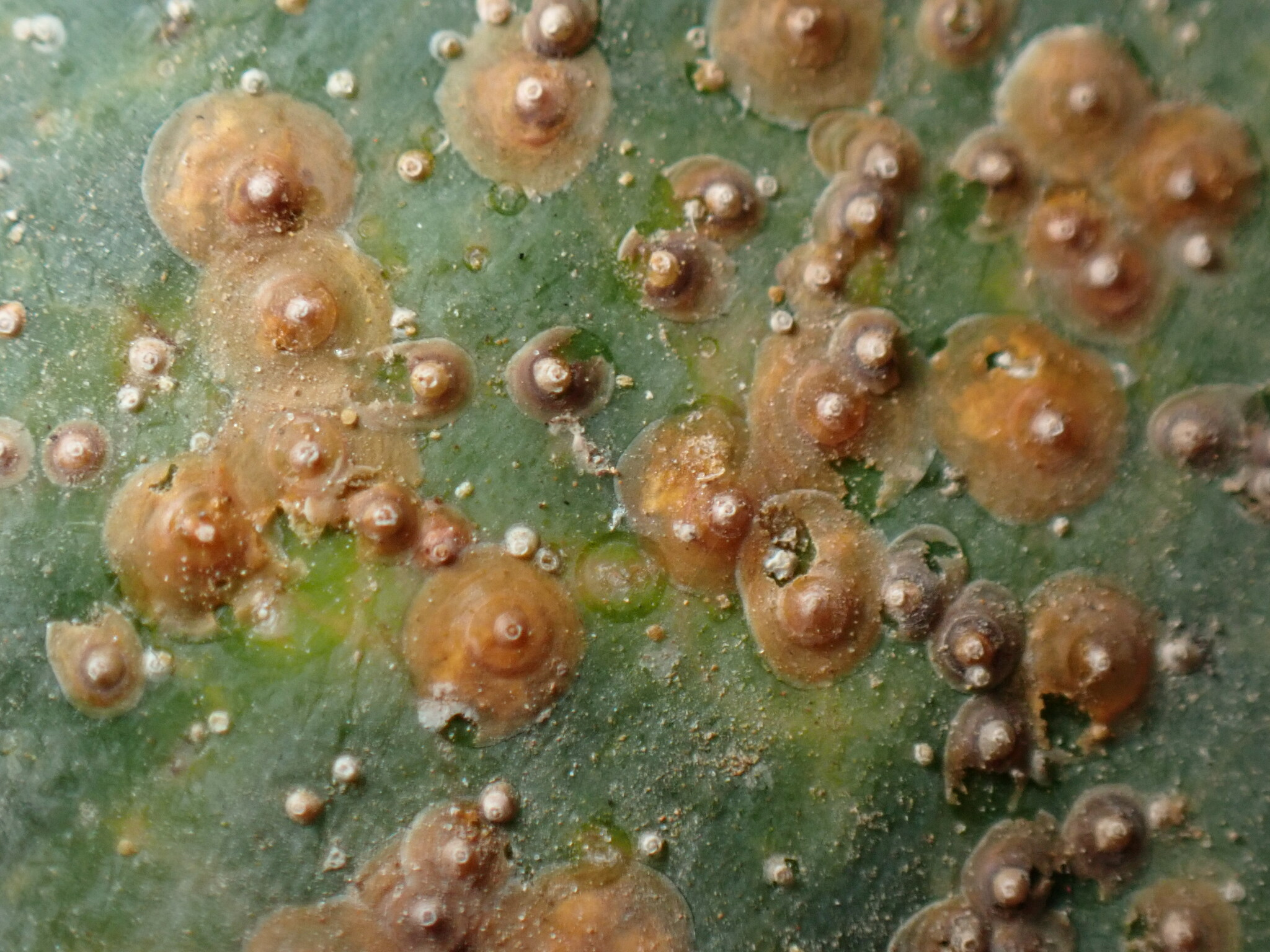
Chrysomphalus dictyospermi, Spain

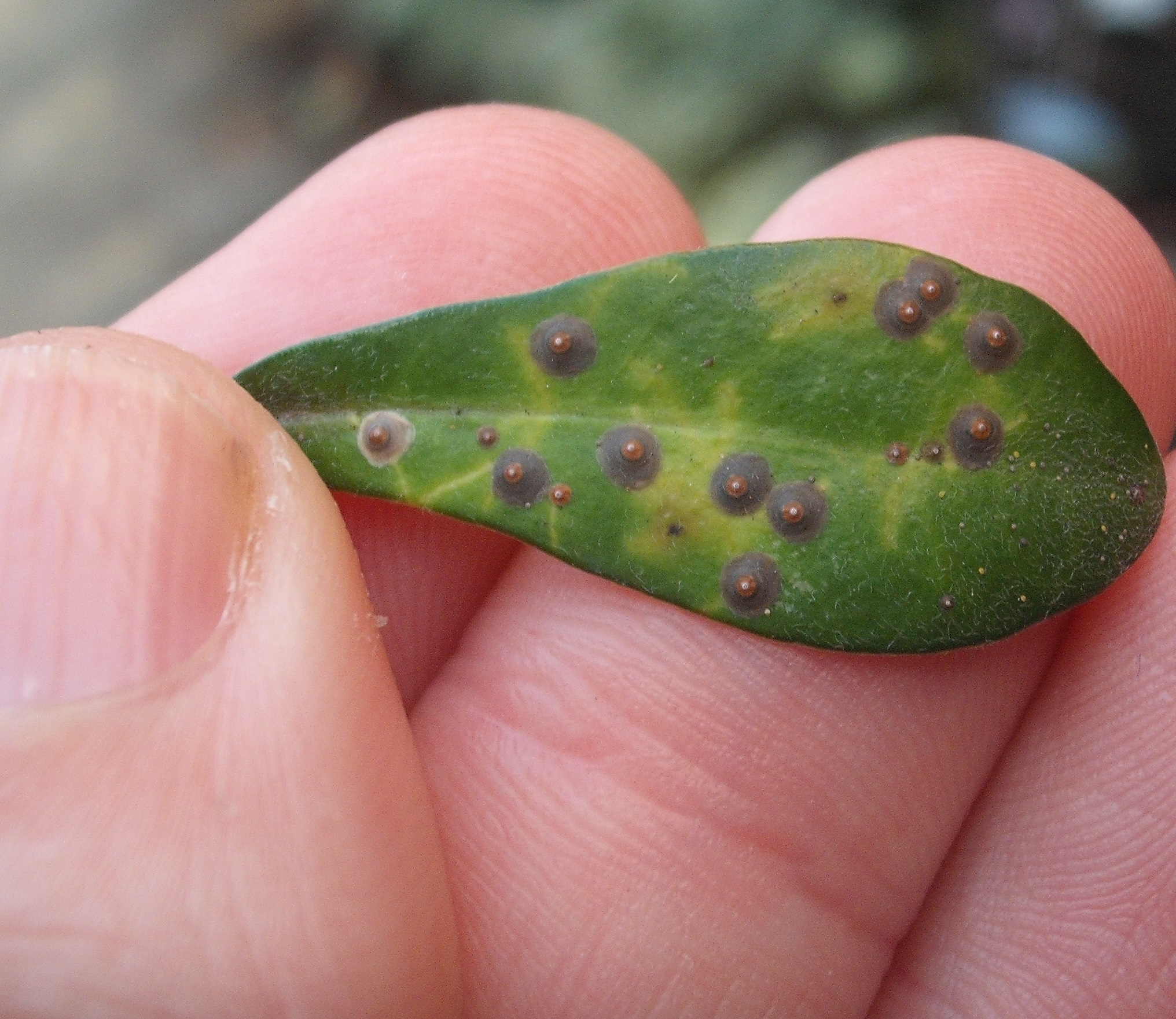
Chrysomphalus pinnulifer, false purple scale, New Zealand

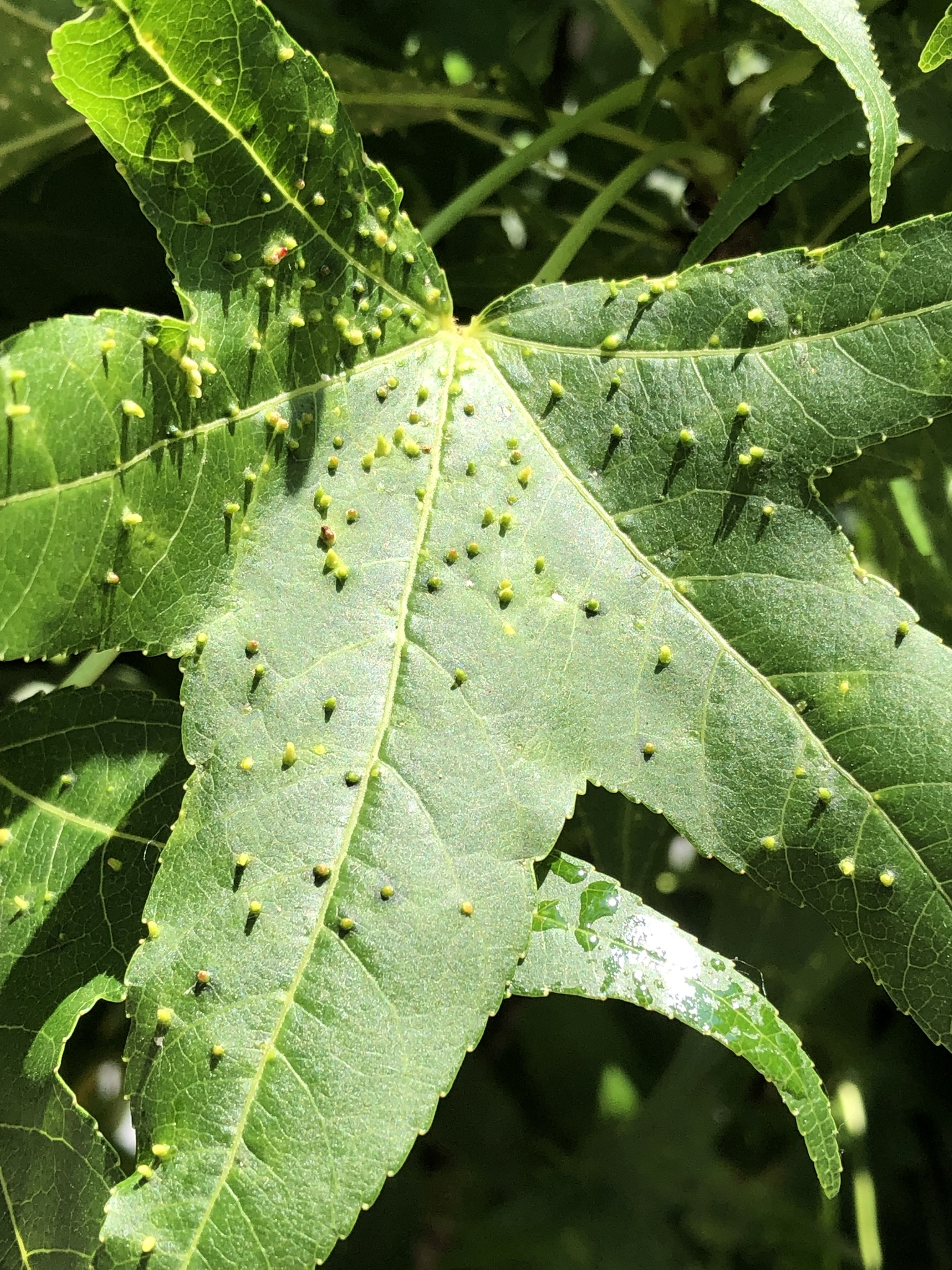
Diaspidiotus liquidambaris, North Carolina

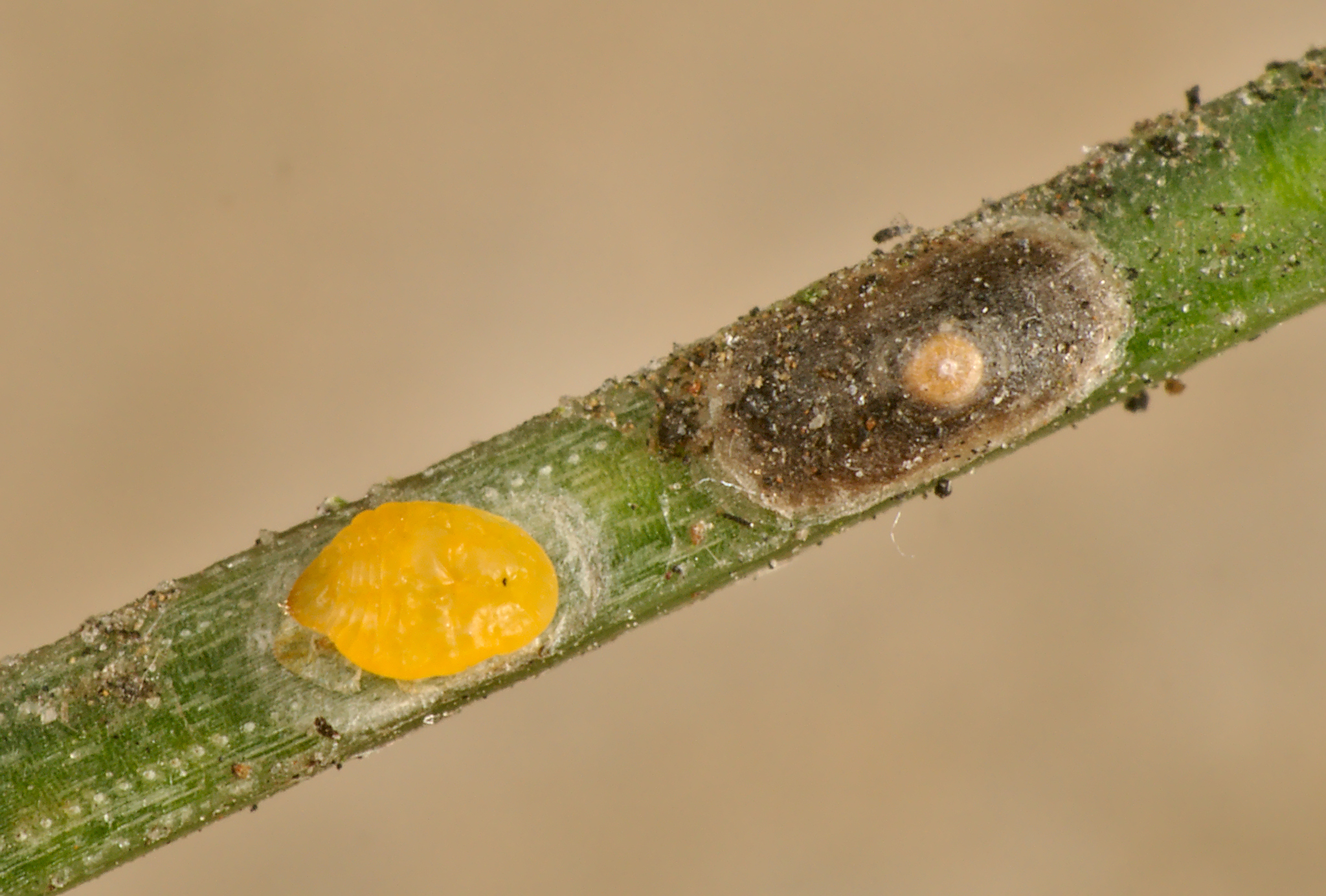
Dynaspidiotus abietis, Belgium

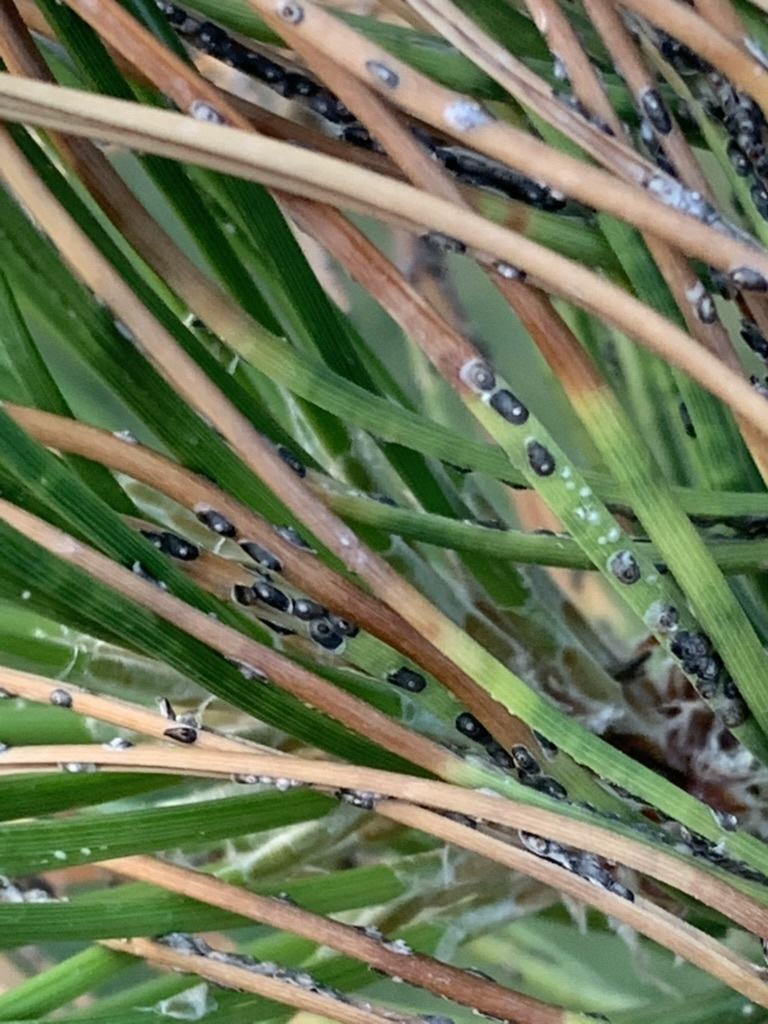
Dynaspidiotus californicus, black pine scale, Utah

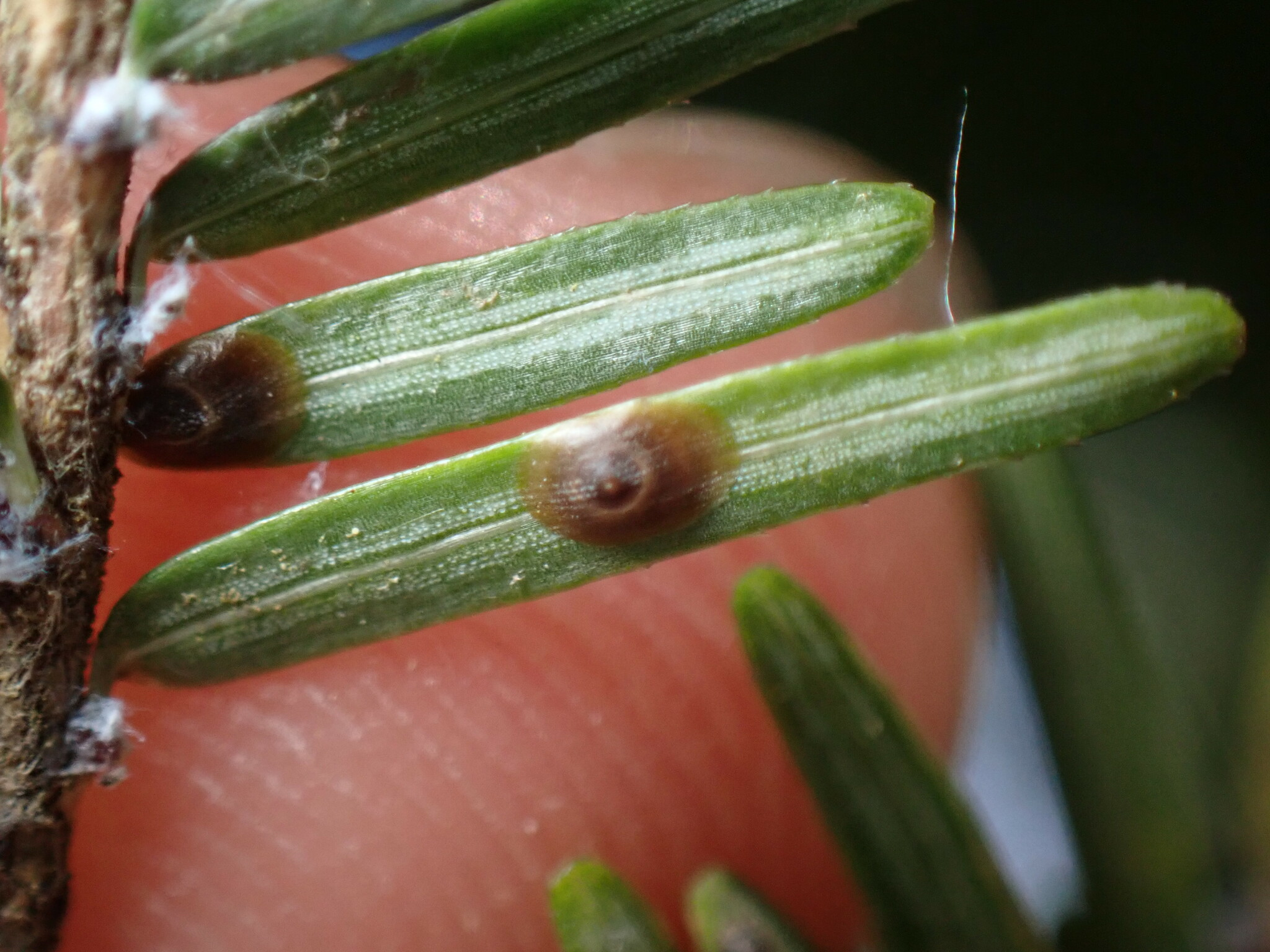
Dynaspidiotus tsugae, short needle connifer scale, New York

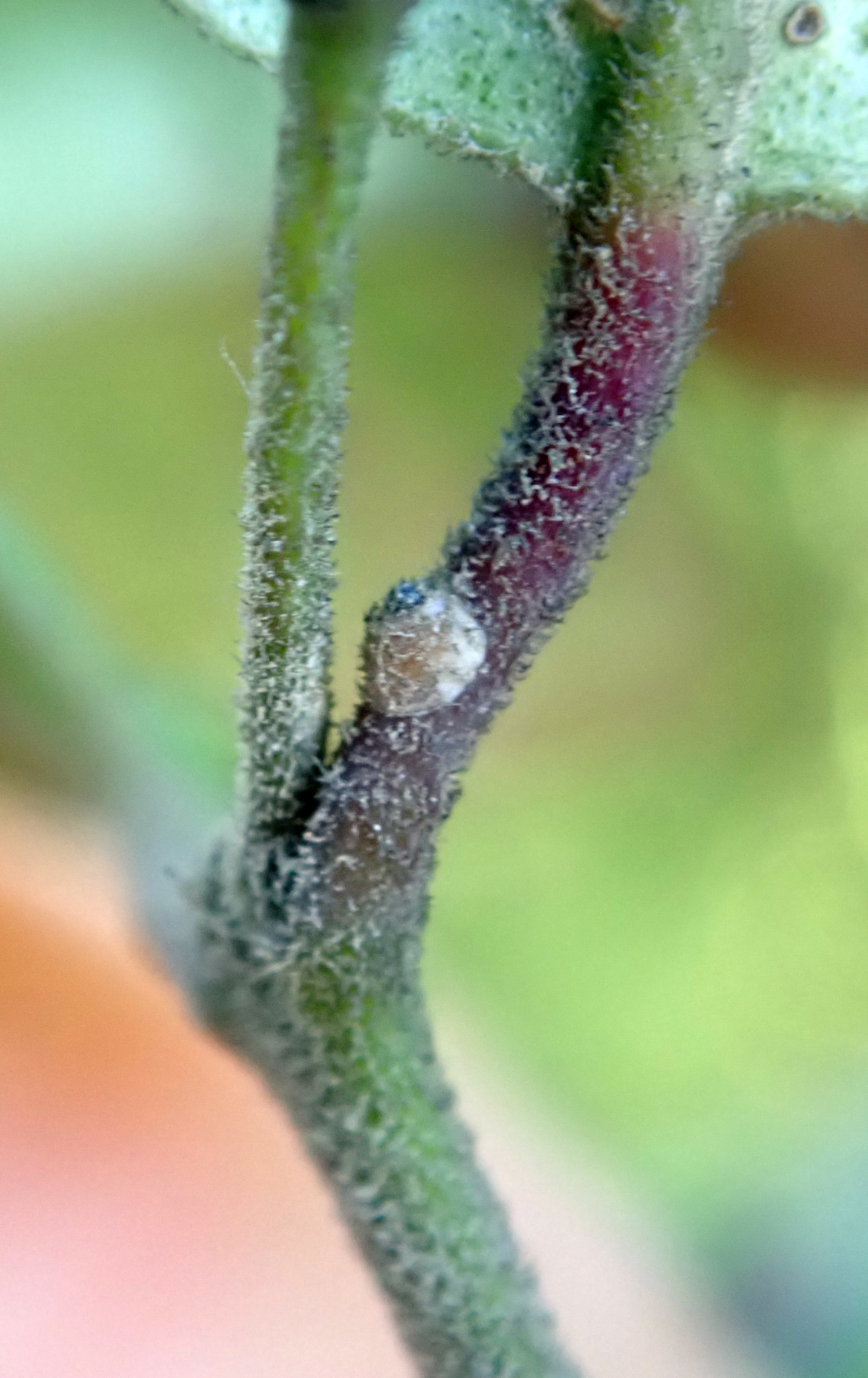
Hemiberlesia lataniae, latania scale, New Zealand

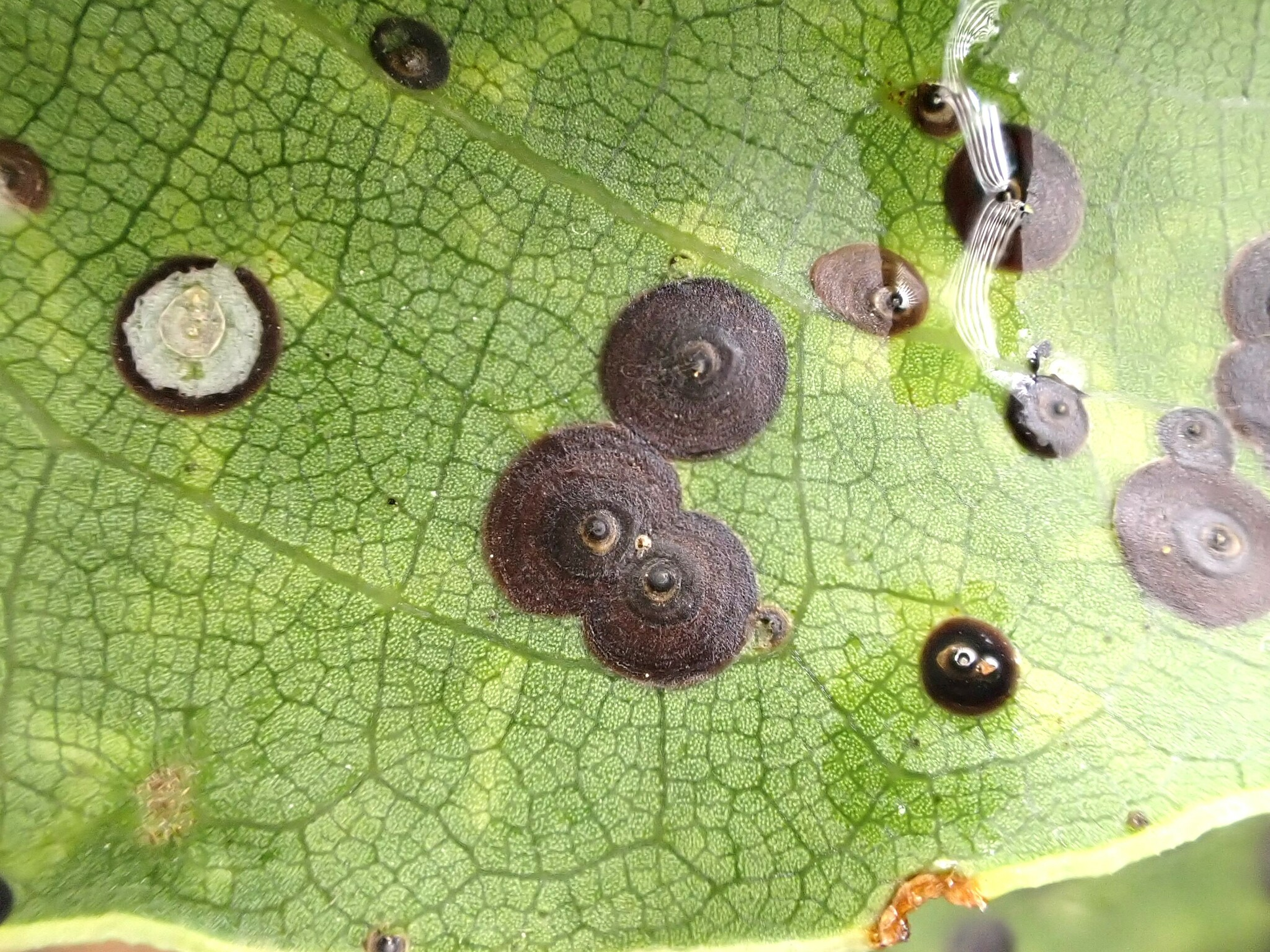
Lindingaspis rossi, Ross's black scale, New Zealand

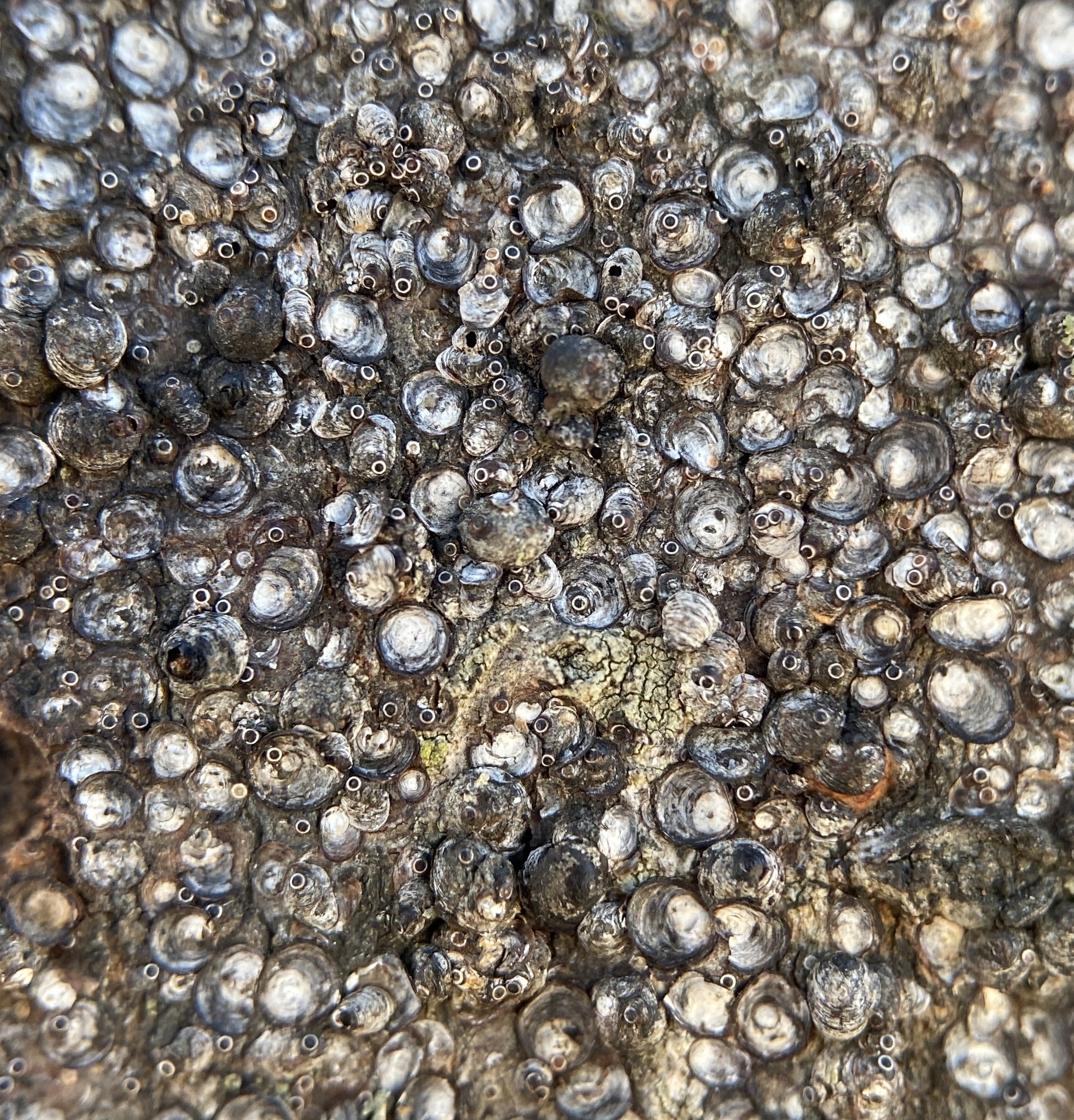
Melanaspis tenebricosa, red maple scale, New York

== Genera ==
These 88 genera belong to the tribe Aspidiotini:

- Acanthaspidiotus Borchsenius & Williams, 1963
- Acutaspis Ferris, 1941
- Affirmaspis MacGillivray, 1921
- Africonidia McKenzie, 1947
- Anaspidiotus Borchsenius & Williams, 1963
- Anastomoderma Beardsley, 1966
- Aonidiella Berlese & Leonardi, 1896
- Aspidaspis Ferris, 1938
- Aspidiella Leonardi, 1898
- Aspidioides MacGillivray, 1921
- Aspidiotus Bouché, 1833
- Avidovaspis Gerson & Davidson, 1974
- Banahaoa Takagi, 2003
- Bigymnaspis Balachowsky, 1958
- Brainaspis MacGillivray, 1921
- Capricornaspis Balachowsky, 1971
- Cephalaspidiotus Takagi, 2003
- Chentraspis Leonardi, 1897
- Chinaspis Gómez-Menor Ortega, 1954
- Chortinaspis Ferris, 1938
- Chrysomphalus Ashmead, 1880
- Clavaspidiotus Takagi & Kawai, 1966
- Clavaspis MacGillivray, 1921
- Comstockaspis MacGillivray, 1921
- Crassaspidiotus Takagi, 1969
- Crenulaspidiotus MacGillivray, 1921
- Cryptaspidiotus Lindinger, 1910
- Cryptophyllaspis Cockerell, 1897
- Cryptoselenaspidus Lindinger, 1910
- Cupressaspis Borchsenius, 1962
- Davidsonaspis Normark, 2014
- Diaonidia Takahashi, 1956
- Diaspidiotus Cockerell, 1897
- Dynaspidiotus Thiem & Gerneck, 1934
- Entaspidiotus MacGillivray, 1921
- Eremiaspis Balachowsky, 1951
- Eugreeeniella Brimblecombe, 1958
- Genistaspis Bodenheimer, 1949
- Gonaspidiotus MacGillivray, 1921
- Greenoidea MacGillivray, 1921
- Helaspis McKenzie, 1963
- Helenococcus Liu & Howell, 1977
- Hemiberlesia Cockerell, 1897
- Hypaspidiotus Takahashi, 1956
- Lindingaspis MacGillivray, 1921
- Marginaspis Hall, 1946
- Megaspidiotus Brimblecombe, 1954
- Melanaspis Cockerell, 1897
- Melissoaspis Ben-Dov, 2010
- Mesoselenaspidus Fonseca, 1969
- Monaonidiella MacGillivray, 1921
- Morganella Cockerell, 1897
- Murataspis Balachowsky & Richardeau, 1942
- Mycetaspis Cockerell, 1897
- Neoclavaspis Brimblecombe, 1959
- Neoselenaspidus Mamet, 1958
- Nigridiaspis Ferris, 1941
- Obtusaspis MacGillivray, 1921
- Oceanaspidiotus Takagi, 1984
- Octaspidiotus MacGillivray, 1921
- Palinaspis Ferris, 1941
- Paranewsteadia MacGillivray, 1921
- Paraselenaspidus Mamet, 1958
- Phaspis Ben-Dov, 1975
- Phaulaspis Leonardi, 1897
- Pseudischnaspis Hempel, 1900
- Pseudoselenaspidus Fonseca, 1962
- Pygidiaspis MacGillivray, 1921
- Reclavaspis Komosinska, 1965
- Remotaspidiotus MacGillivray, 1921
- Rhizaspidiotus MacGillivray, 1921
- Rugaspidiotus MacGillivray, 1921
- Rungaspis Balachowsky, 1949
- Saharaspis Balachowsky, 1951
- Sakalavaspis Mamet, 1954
- Schizaspis Cockerell & Robinson, 1915
- Schizentaspidus Mamet, 1958
- Selenaspidopsis Nakahara, 1984
- Selenaspidus Cockerell, 1897
- Selenediella Mamet, 1958
- Selenomphalos Mamet, 1958
- Spinaspidiotus MacGillivray, 1921
- Sudanaspis Chou, 1985
- Suluaspis Takagi, 2007
- Taiwanaspidiotus Takagi, 1969
- Targionia Signoret, 1869
- Unaspidiotus MacGillivray, 1921
- Varicaspis MacGillivray, 1921
