= Aspidiellina =

Scientific classification
- Domain: Eukaryota
- Kingdom: Animalia
- Phylum: Arthropoda
- Class: Insecta
- Order: Hemiptera
- Suborder: Sternorrhyncha
- Family: Diaspididae
- Subfamily: Aspidiotinae
- Tribe: Aspidiotini
- Subtribe: Aspidiellina; Borchsenius, 1966

Genera
- See text

Subtribe of true bugs

Aspidiellina is a subtribe of armored scale insects. While the subtribe Aspidiellina was not mentioned in Takagi's 2002 study, the Aspidiotini were not deemed as problematical as the Diaspidini and Lepidosaphidini.

== Genera ==
- Arundaspis Borchsenius, 1949
- Aspidiella Leonardi, 1898
- Eremiaspis
- Remotaspidiotus
- Rhizaspidiotus
- Stringaspidiotus
- Tollaspidiotus
