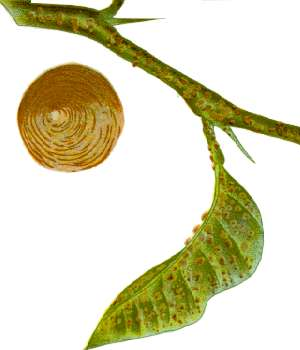

Scientific classification
- Domain: Eukaryota
- Kingdom: Animalia
- Phylum: Arthropoda
- Class: Insecta
- Order: Hemiptera
- Suborder: Sternorrhyncha
- Family: Diaspididae
- Tribe: Aspidiotini
- Subtribe: Aspidiotina
- Genus: Aspidiotus
- Species: A. nerii

Binomial name
- Aspidiotus nerii Bouché, 1833

= Aspidiotus nerii =

Species of true bug

Aspidiotus nerii is a species of armored scale insect with the common names oleander scale and ivy scale.

The species are pests of citrus, sago palm, oleander, English ivy, and palm, among others. Three to four generations are born inside each year.
