= Pseudaonidiina =

Scientific classification
- Domain: Eukaryota
- Kingdom: Animalia
- Phylum: Arthropoda
- Class: Insecta
- Order: Hemiptera
- Suborder: Sternorrhyncha
- Family: Diaspididae
- Subfamily: Aspidiotinae
- Tribe: Aspidiotini
- Subtribe: Pseudaonidiina

Subtribe of true bugs

Pseudaonidiina is a subtribe of armored scale insects.

== Genera ==
- Aspidonymus
- Diaphoraspis
- Diaspidopus
- Diastolaspis
- Dichosoma
- Duplaspidiotus
- Eulaingia
- Gomphaspidiotus
- Icaraspidiotus
- Mimeraspis
- Myrtophila
- Neomorgania
- Operculaspis
- Paraonidia
- Parrottia
- Pseudaonidia
- Pseudaonidiella
- Pseudotargionia
- Sadaotakagia
- Semelaspidus
