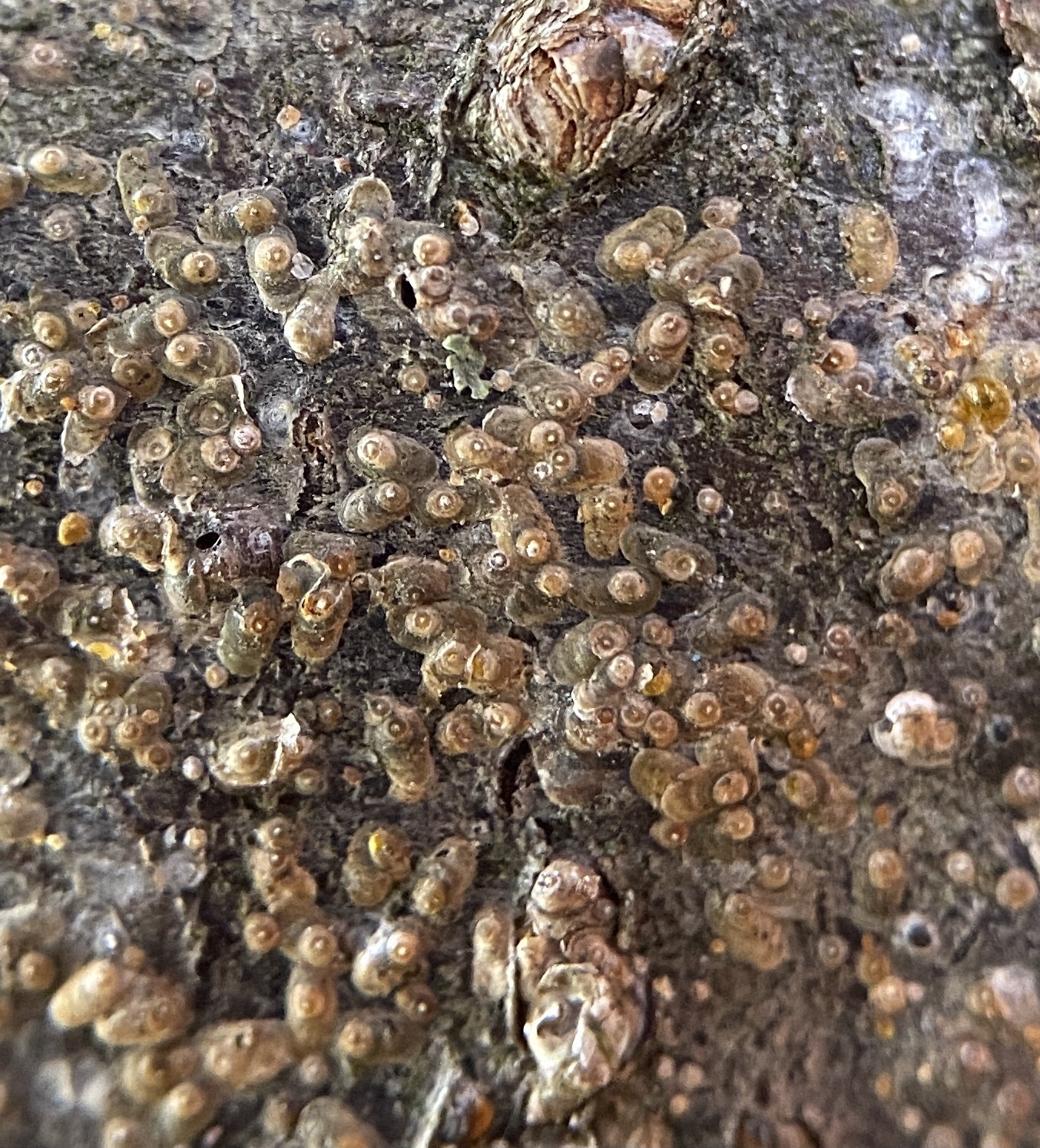
- Comstockaspis perniciosa

Scientific classification
- Kingdom: Animalia
- Phylum: Arthropoda
- Class: Insecta
- Order: Hemiptera
- Suborder: Sternorrhyncha
- Family: Diaspididae
- Subfamily: Aspidiotinae
- Tribe: Aspidiotini
- Genus: Comstockaspis; MacGillivray, 1921

= Comstockaspis =

Genus of scale insects

Comstockaspis is a genus of armoured scales in the family Diaspididae. This genus has two species.

== Species ==
These two species belong to the genus Comstockaspis:

- Comstockaspis perniciosa (Comstock, 1881) (San Jose scale, China scale) (worldwide)
- Comstockaspis macroporana (Takagi, 1956) (Japan, Korea)
