= Chrysomphalus aonidum =

Scientific classification
- Kingdom: Animalia
- Phylum: Arthropoda
- Class: Insecta
- Order: Hemiptera
- Suborder: Sternorrhyncha
- Family: Diaspididae
- Genus: Chrysomphalus
- Species: C. aonidum

Binomial name
- Chrysomphalus aonidum (Linnaeus, 1758)

Species of true bug

Chrysomphalus aonidum, known generally as Florida red scale, is a species of armored scale insect in the family Diaspididae. Other common names include the Egyptian black scale, circular black scale, and citrus black scale. It is found in Europe.
