= Chrysomphalus dictyospermi =

Scientific classification
- Domain: Eukaryota
- Kingdom: Animalia
- Phylum: Arthropoda
- Class: Insecta
- Order: Hemiptera
- Suborder: Sternorrhyncha
- Family: Diaspididae
- Genus: Chrysomphalus
- Species: C. dictyospermi

Binomial name
- Chrysomphalus dictyospermi (Morgan, 1889)

Species of true bug

Chrysomphalus dictyospermi is a species of armored scale insect with the common name dictyospermum scale in the family Diaspididae.
