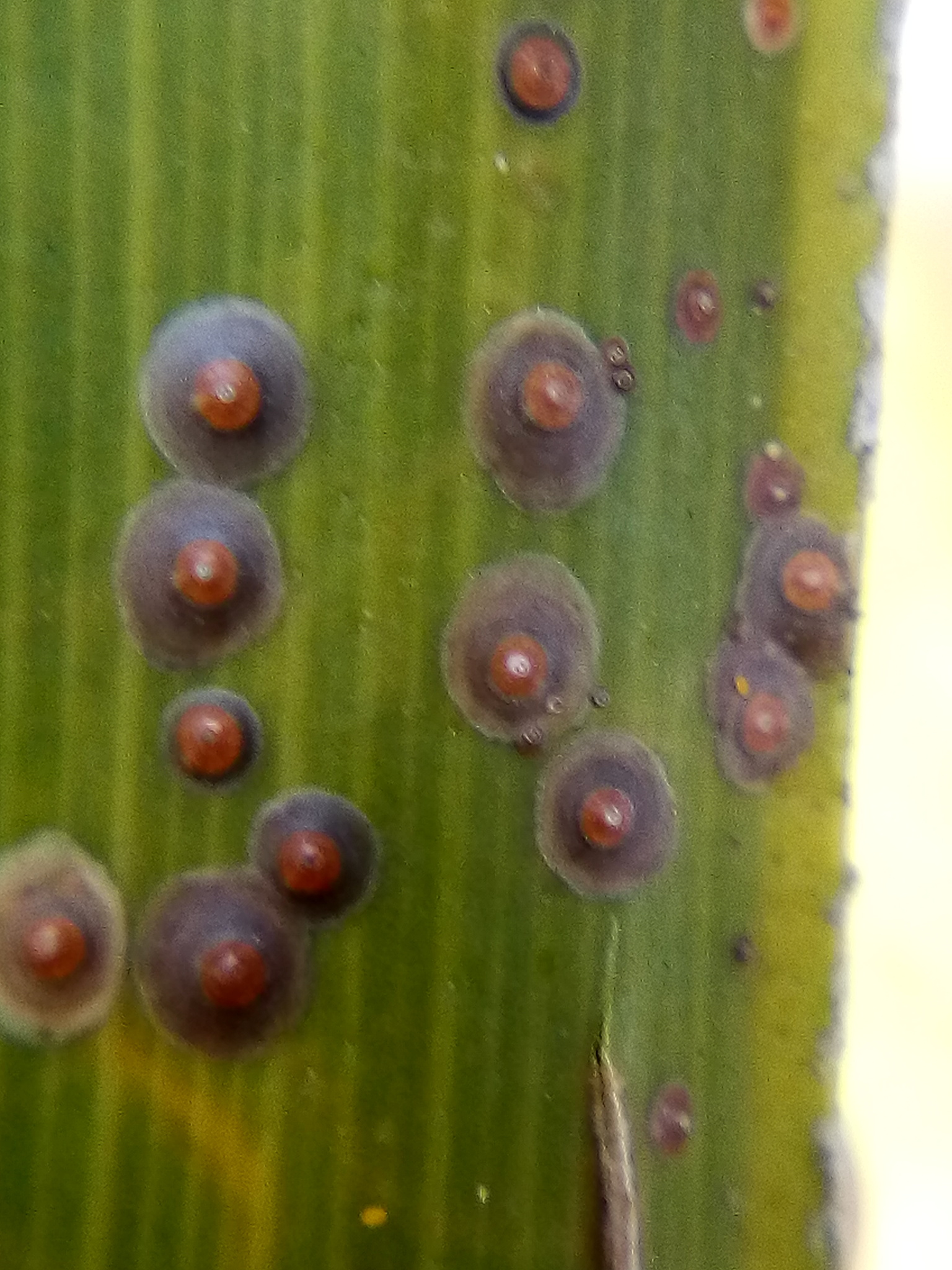
- Chrysomphalus pinnulifer, New Zealand

Scientific classification
- Domain: Eukaryota
- Kingdom: Animalia
- Phylum: Arthropoda
- Class: Insecta
- Order: Hemiptera
- Suborder: Sternorrhyncha
- Family: Diaspididae
- Subfamily: Aspidiotinae
- Tribe: Aspidiotini
- Subtribe: Aspidiotina
- Genus: Chrysomphalus; Ashmead, 1880

= Chrysomphalus =

Genus of scale insects

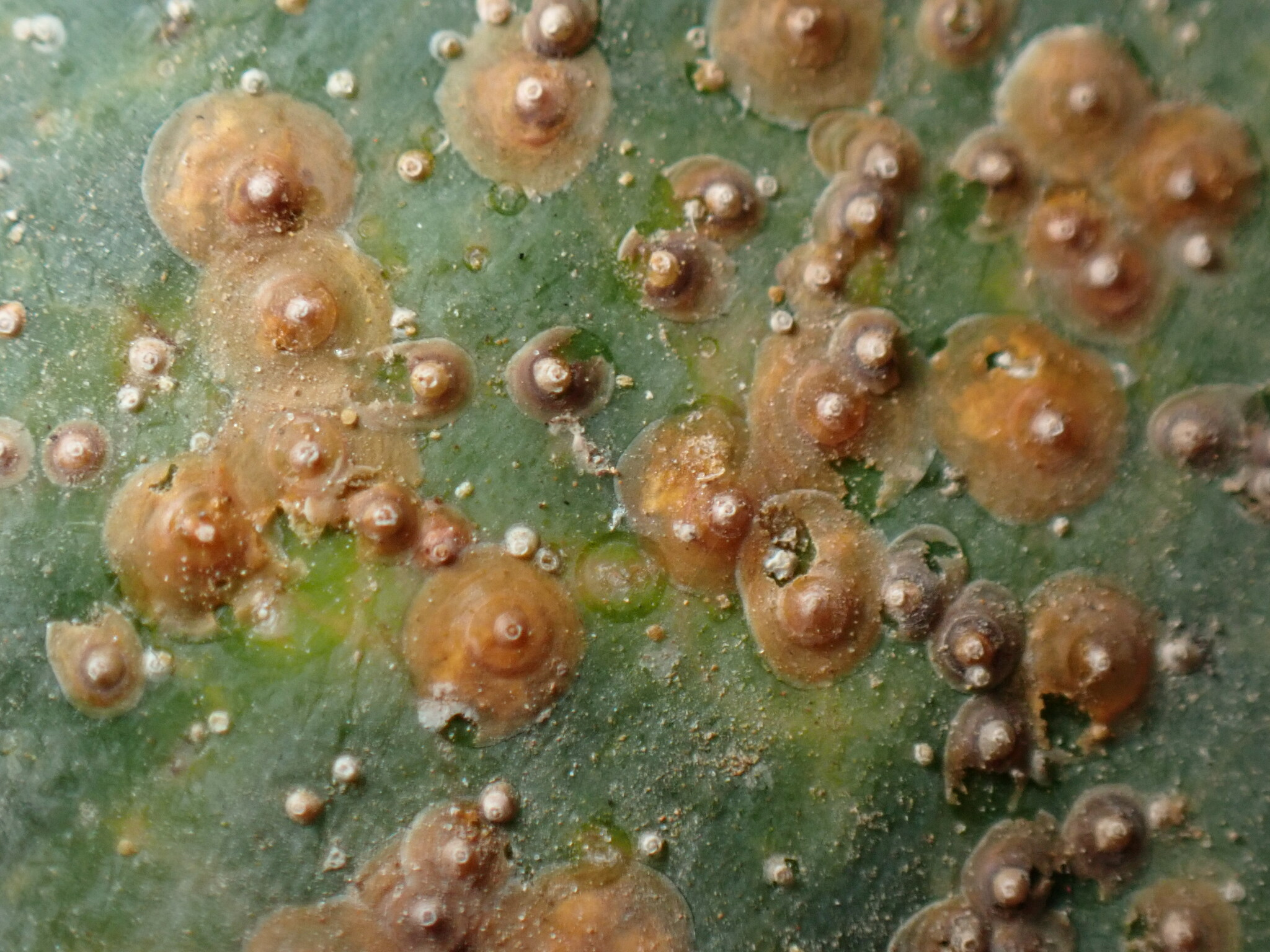
Chrysomphalus dictyospermi, Spain

Chrysomphalus is a genus of armoured scales in the family Diaspididae. There are about 17 described species in Chrysomphalus.

== Species ==
These 17 species belong to the genus Chrysomphalus:

- Chrysomphalus aberrans Mamet, 1951
- Chrysomphalus ansei (Green, 1916)
- Chrysomphalus aonidum (Linnaeus, 1758) (Egyptian black scale)
- Chrysomphalus bifasciculatus Ferris, 1938 (bifasciculate scale)
- Chrysomphalus dictyospermi (Morgan, 1889) (Dictyospermum scale)
- Chrysomphalus diversicolor (Green, 1923)
- Chrysomphalus fodiens (Maskell, 1892)
- Chrysomphalus mume Tang, 1984
- Chrysomphalus nepenthivorus Smith-Pardo, Evans & Dooley
- Chrysomphalus nulliporus McKenzie, 1939
- Chrysomphalus pinnulifer (Maskell, 1891)
- Chrysomphalus propsimus Banks, 1906
- Chrysomphalus prosimus Banks, 1906
- Chrysomphalus rubribullatus (Froggatt, 1914)
- Chrysomphalus silvestrii Chou, 1946
- Chrysomphalus trifasciculatus Brimblecombe, 1959
- Chrysomphalus variabilis McKenzie, 1943
