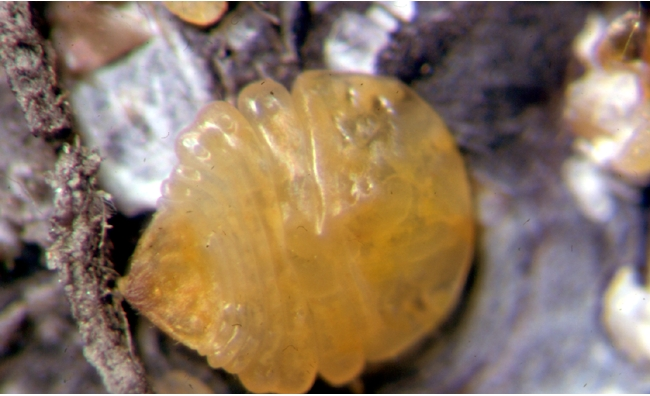
- Adult female with protective scale removed

Scientific classification
- Domain: Eukaryota
- Kingdom: Animalia
- Phylum: Arthropoda
- Class: Insecta
- Order: Hemiptera
- Suborder: Sternorrhyncha
- Family: Diaspididae
- Genus: Diaspidiotus
- Species: D. juglansregiae

Binomial name
- Diaspidiotus juglansregiae (Comstock, 1881)

Synonyms
- Quadraspidiotus juglansregiae Comstock, 1881

= Diaspidiotus juglansregiae =

Species of scale insect

Diaspidiotus juglansregiae, commonly known as the walnut scale, is a species of armoured scale insect in the family Diaspididae. It is native to North America where it feeds on a wide range of ornamental and forest trees and bushes.

== Description ==
Adult and young females of this species are nearly circular, the insect being hidden under a tough flattish scale composed of the exuviae from the first two nymphal instars. There are small marginal notches between the prothorax, mesothorax and metathorax. The upper surface of the scale is pale grey with a reddish-brown spot, and the underside is yellowish. The adult female is about 3 mm (0.12 in) long while the nymphs are smaller. Male nymphs are similar, except that the scale is oval rather than round; after the last moult, the adult male emerges as a small, winged insects similar to a fly in appearance. Male nymphs sometimes burrow under the rim of a female scale forming a daisy-shaped group.

== Distribution and habitat ==
Diaspidiotus juglansregiae is native to North America, where it occurs in Canada, the United States and Mexico. It has been found on at least forty genera of ornamental and forest trees and bushes, including walnut, maple, liquidambar, tuliptree, boxwood, camellia, dogwood, holly, cherry, peach and plum.

== Ecology ==
Second instar nymphs and adult females of this species pierce twigs and branches with their mouthparts and suck sap from the inner bark of the host tree. If there are large numbers of scales, the tree may become water stressed; soft shoots may droop, inner tissues may die back, and the bark may crack. A more serious consequence of infestation by the scale is that it may allow entry of pathogenic funguses of the genus Botryosphaeria, which can cause cankers, dieback and tree death. Natural predators of this scale insect include the tiny beetle Cybocephalus californicus, and the twice-stabbed lady beetle (Chilocorus orbus). Additionally, two small parasitic wasps, an Aphytis and an Encarsia species, lay their eggs inside the scale nymphs.

In Maryland there is one generation per year. Both sexes overwinter as second instars, winged males appearing in April or May, and adult females laying a batch of twenty to forty eggs in June and July, and single eggs sporadically thereafter. The first instar nymphs, known as crawlers, emerged from under the female's scale in late June and moved to new locations, most settling by the end of July, but a few still on the move in September. In Ohio however, there are two generations each year, with both males and females overwintering as second instar nymphs, followed by a prepupal stage in April. In Missouri there may be three generations in the year.
