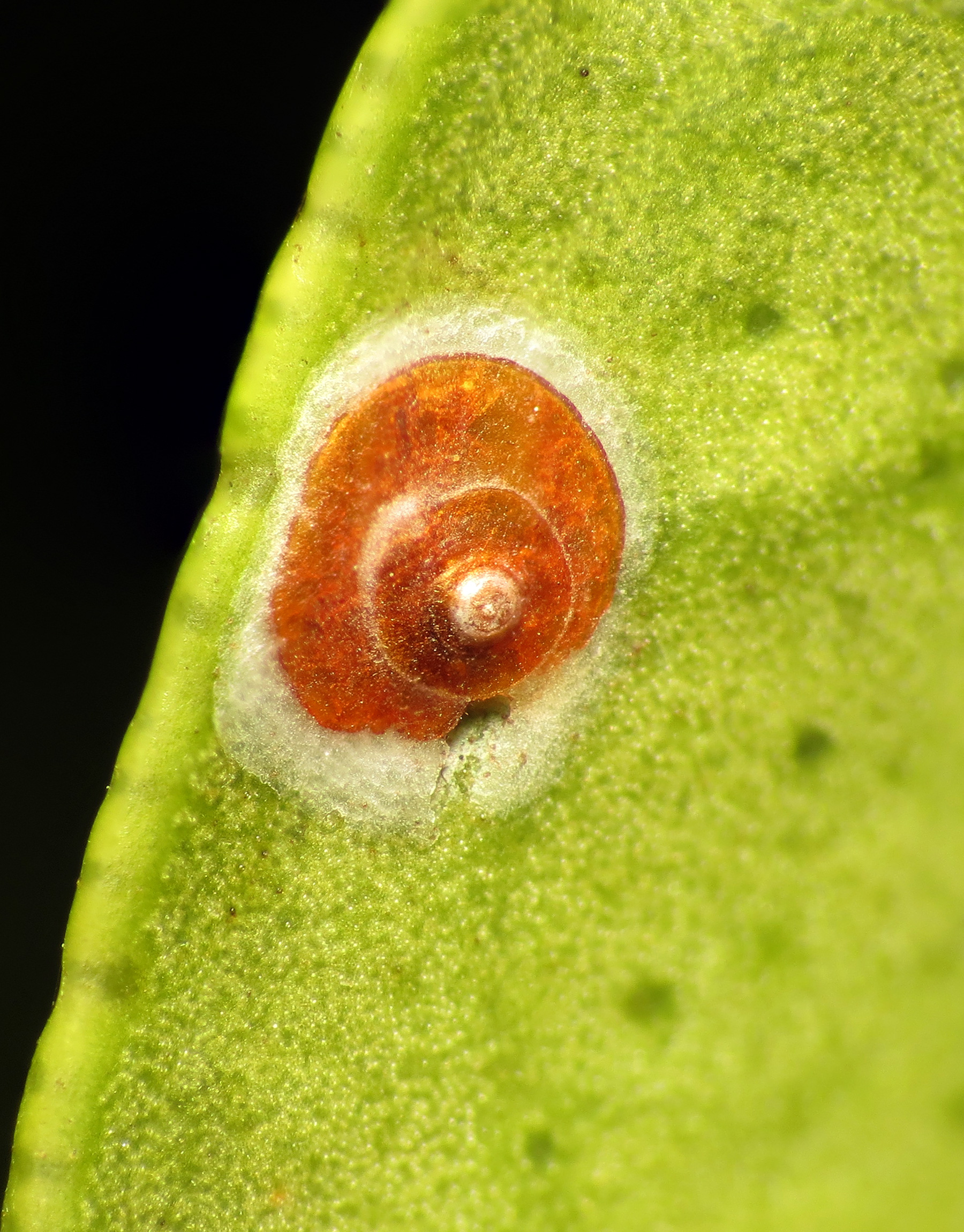
- Aonidiella sp.

Scientific classification
- Domain: Eukaryota
- Kingdom: Animalia
- Phylum: Arthropoda
- Class: Insecta
- Order: Hemiptera
- Suborder: Sternorrhyncha
- Family: Diaspididae
- Subfamily: Aspidiotinae
- Tribe: Aspidiotini
- Subtribe: Aspidiotina
- Genus: Aonidiella; Berlese and Leonardi, 1895

Species
- About 32, see text

= Aonidiella =

Genus of true bugs

Aonidiella is a genus of scale insects in the family Diaspididae, the armored scale insects. Several species are pests of citrus.

Species include:

- Aonidiella abietina
- Aonidiella araucariae
- Aonidiella atlantorum
- Aonidiella aurantii – California red scale
- Aonidiella bruni
- Aonidiella citrina – yellow scale
- Aonidiella comperei
- Aonidiella crenata
- Aonidiella ensifera
- Aonidiella eremocitri
- Aonidiella eugeniae
- Aonidiella godfreyi
- Aonidiella gracilis
- Aonidiella inornata – inornate scale
- Aonidiella lauretorum
- Aonidiella longicorna
- Aonidiella marginipora
- Aonidiella messengeri
- Aonidiella orientalis – Oriental yellow scale
- Aonidiella pini
- Aonidiella pothi
- Aonidiella replicata
- Aonidiella rex
- Aonidiella schoutedeni
- Aonidiella simplex
- Aonidiella sotetsu
- Aonidiella taorensis
- Aonidiella taxus
- Aonidiella tectaria
- Aonidiella tinerfensis
- Aonidiella tsugae
- Aonidiella yehudithae
