= Abgrallaspis cyanophylli =

Scientific classification
- Kingdom: Animalia
- Phylum: Arthropoda
- Clade: Pancrustacea
- Class: Insecta
- Order: Hemiptera
- Suborder: Sternorrhyncha
- Family: Diaspididae
- Genus: Abgrallaspis
- Species: A. cyanophylli

Binomial name
- Abgrallaspis cyanophylli (Signoret, 1869)

Species of true bug

Abgrallaspis cyanophylli, the cyanophyllum scale, is one of nine species of the Abgrallaspis genus of armored scale insects. It is a pest throughout the Tropical South Pacific, attacking fruits and ornamental plants.
