= Targionia (insect) =

Scientific classification
- Domain: Eukaryota
- Kingdom: Animalia
- Phylum: Arthropoda
- Class: Insecta
- Order: Hemiptera
- Suborder: Sternorrhyncha
- Family: Diaspididae
- Genus: Targionia; Signoret, 1868

Genus of bugs

Targionia is a genus of armoured scales in the family Diaspididae. There are 14 described species in Targionia.

== Species ==
These 14 species belong to the genus Targionia:

- Targionia anabasidis (Borchsenius, 1952)
- Targionia arthrophyti (Archangelskaya, 1931)
- Targionia balachowskyi (Kaussari, 1952)
- Targionia bigeloviae (Cockerell, 1897) (bigelovia scale)
- Targionia fabianae Leonardi, 1911
- Targionia halophila (Balachowsky, 1928)
- Targionia haloxyloni Hall, 1926
- Targionia nigra Signoret, 1870
- Targionia parayuccarum Munting, 1965
- Targionia porifera (Borchsenius, 1949)
- Targionia prionota (Green & Laing, 1923)
- Targionia stoebae Munting, 1965
- Targionia vitis (Signoret, 1876)
- Targionia yuccarum (Cockerell, 1898)
