= Mckenzieana =

Scientific classification
- Kingdom: Animalia
- Phylum: Arthropoda
- Class: Insecta
- Order: Hemiptera
- Suborder: Sternorrhyncha
- Family: Diaspididae
- Genus: †Mckenzieana; McKenzie, 1963

Synonyms
- Helaspis McKenzie, 1963

Extinct genus of scale insects

Mckenzieana is a monotypic fossil genus of scale insects belonging to the family Diaspididae. The only species in this genus is Mckenzieana mexicana.

The species is similar to Aspidiotus.
