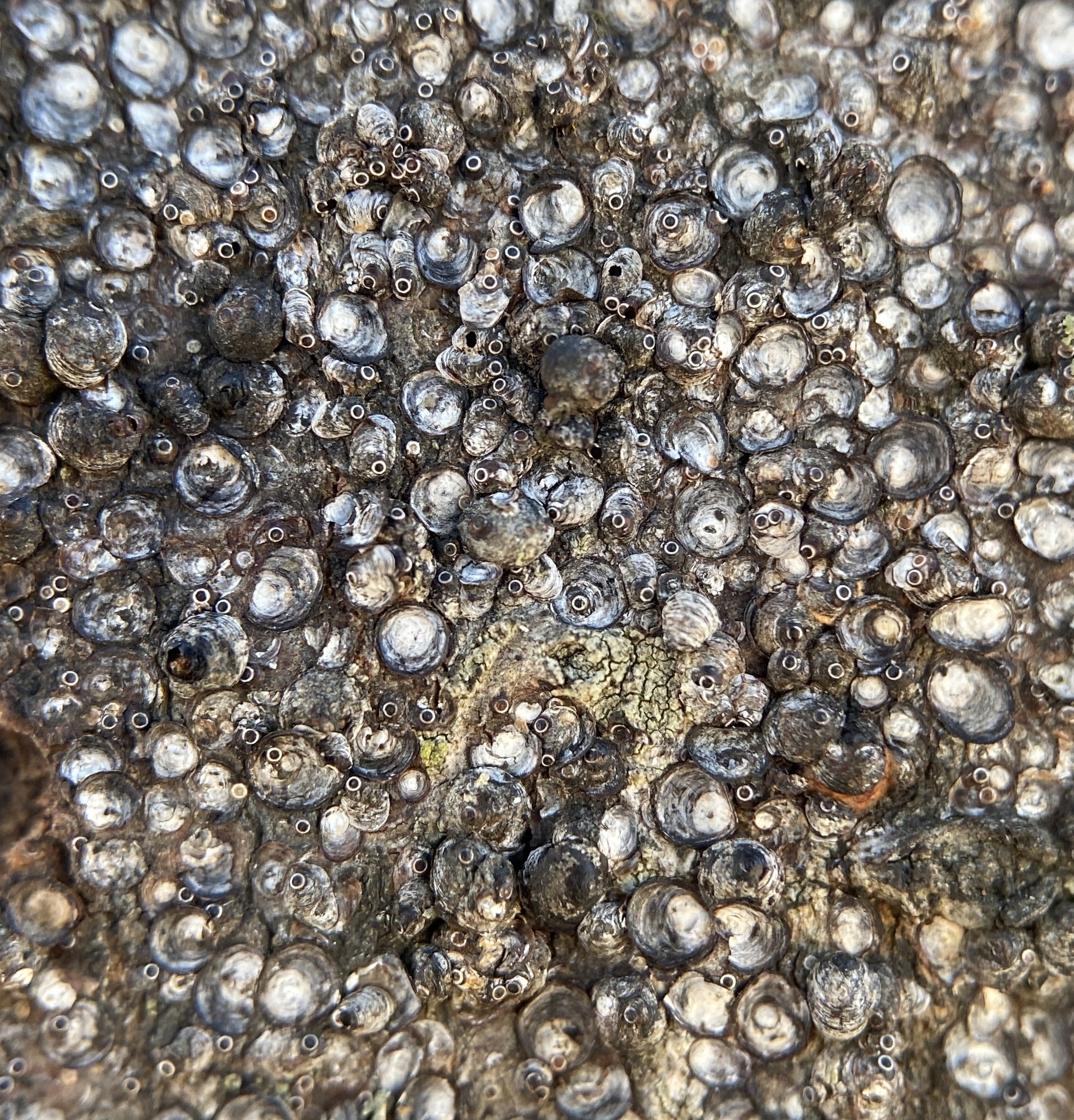
- Melanaspis tenebricosa, New York

Scientific classification
- Kingdom: Animalia
- Phylum: Arthropoda
- Class: Insecta
- Order: Hemiptera
- Suborder: Sternorrhyncha
- Family: Diaspididae
- Subtribe: Aspidiotina
- Genus: Melanaspis; Cockerell, 1897

= Melanaspis =

Genus of true bugs

Melanaspis is a genus of armoured scales in the family Diaspididae. There are more than 60 described species in Melanaspis.

== Species ==
These 64 species belong to the genus Melanaspis:

- Melanaspis araucariae Lepage, 1942 (Brazil)
- Melanaspis aristotelesi Lepage & Giannotti, 1944 (Brazil)
- Melanaspis arnaldoi (Costa Lima, 1924) (Brazil)
- Melanaspis artemisiae Mamet, 1959 (Madagascar)
- Melanaspis arundinariae Deitz & Davidson, 1986 (United States)
- Melanaspis bolivari Balachowsky, 1959 (Colombia)
- Melanaspis bondari Lepage & Giannotti, 1943 (Brazil)
- Melanaspis bromiliae (Leonardi, 1899) (ananas scale)
- Melanaspis calura (Cockerell, 1898) (Central and South America, Philippines)
- Melanaspis campylanthi (Lindinger, 1911) (Canary Islands)
- Melanaspis casuarinae Mamet, 1954 (Madagascar)
- Melanaspis chrysobalani (Leonardi, 1914) (Africa)
- Melanaspis coccolobae Ferris, 1943 (the Americas)
- Melanaspis corticosa (Brain, 1919) (South African Obscure Scale) (Mozambique, Guinea, South Africa, Zimbabwe)
- Melanaspis cubensis Deitz & Davidson, 1986 (Cuba)
- Melanaspis deklei Deitz & Davidson, 1986 (United States, Mexico)
- Melanaspis delicata Ferris, 1941 (United States)
- Melanaspis deliquescens Ferris, 1941 (Mexico, United States)
- Melanaspis eglandulosa (Lindinger in: Brick, 1909) (Panama, Guatemala)
- Melanaspis elaeagni McKenzie, 1957 (Black elaegnus scale) (Central and North America)
- Melanaspis enceliae (Ferris, 1921) (Mexico)
- Melanaspis figueiredoi Lepage, 1942 (Brazil)
- Melanaspis frankiniae Ferris, 1941 (Mexico)
- Melanaspis greeni (Leonardi, 1914) (Guinea)
- Melanaspis indurata (Ferris, 1921) (Mexico)
- Melanaspis inopinata (Leonardi, 1913) (Europe, western Asia)
- Melanaspis jamaicensis Davidson, 1970 (United States)
- Melanaspis latipyga Ferris, 1941 (Central and North America)
- Melanaspis leivasi (Costa Lima, 1924) (Central and South America)
- Melanaspis lilacina (Cockerell, 1898) (dark oak scale) (United States, Mexico)
- Melanaspis lilloi Schneider, Claps, Wei, Normark & Normark, 2020
- Melanaspis longula Ferris, 1941 (Panama, Mexico)
- Melanaspis louristanus Balachowsky & Kaussari, 1953 (Iran)
- Melanaspis madagascariensis Mamet, 1951 (Madagascar, Angola)
- Melanaspis marlatti (Parrott, 1899) (United States, Japan)
- Melanaspis martinsi Lepage, 1942 (Brazil)
- Melanaspis mimosae (Comstock, 1883) (Mimosa scale) (United States, Mexico)
- Melanaspis monotes (Hall, 1929) (Zimbabwe)
- Melanaspis nigropunctata (Cockerell, 1896) (Central and North America, Caribbean)
- Melanaspis nothofagi Hardy & Williams, 2018
- Melanaspis obscura (Comstock, 1881) (obscure scale) (North America, Japan)
- Melanaspis odontoglossi (Cockerell, 1893) (the Americas)
- Melanaspis pedina Munting, 1969 (South Africa, Namibia)
- Melanaspis phenax (Cockerell, 1901) (Zimbabwe, Guinea, South Africa)
- Melanaspis philippiae Mamet, 1959 (Madagascar)
- Melanaspis pinicola Deitz & Davidson, 1986 (Mexico, Guatemala)
- Melanaspis pistaciae Hosseininaveh & Kaydan
- Melanaspis ponderosa Ferris, 1941 (Panama, Mexico, Colombia)
- Melanaspis pseudoponderosa Deitz & Davidson, 1986 (United States)
- Melanaspis reticulata Ferris, 1943 (Mexico)
- Melanaspis rotunda Ferris, 1943 (Mexico)
- Melanaspis saccharicola (Costa Lima, 1934) (Brazil)
- Melanaspis sacculata Ferris, 1943 (Mexico)
- Melanaspis sansevii Mamet, 1959 (Madagascar)
- Melanaspis santensis Lepage, 1942 (Brazil)
- Melanaspis smilacis (Comstock, 1883) (Smilax scale)
- Melanaspis squamea Ferris, 1943 (Panama, Guatemala, Mexico)
- Melanaspis sulcata Ferris, 1943
- Melanaspis targionoides Schneider, Claps, Wei, Normark & Normark, 2020
- Melanaspis tenax McKenzie, 1944 (the Americas)
- Melanaspis tenebricosa (Comstock, 1881) (gloomy scale) (Panama, United States, Mexico)
- Melanaspis tricuspis Ferris, 1941 (Mexico)
- Melanaspis vilardeboi Balachowsky, 1953 (Guinea)
- Melanaspis williamsi De Lotto, 1957 (Kenya)
