= Smilacicola =

Scientific classification
- Domain: Eukaryota
- Kingdom: Animalia
- Phylum: Arthropoda
- Class: Insecta
- Order: Hemiptera
- Suborder: Sternorrhyncha
- Family: Diaspididae
- Subfamily: Aspidiotinae
- Tribe: Smilacicolini
- Genus: Smilacicola; Takagi

Genus of scale insects

Smilacicola is a genus in the armored scale insect family Diaspididae, the sole genus of the tribe Smilacicolini. There are at least three described species in Smilacicola, found in eastern Asia.

== Species ==
These three species belong to the genus Smilacicola:

- Smilacicola apicalis Takagi, 1969 (China, Taiwan)
- Smilacicola crenatus Takagi, 1983 (China)
- Smilacicola heimi (Balachowsky, 1947) (Vietnam)
