= Morganella (insect) =

Scientific classification
- Domain: Eukaryota
- Kingdom: Animalia
- Phylum: Arthropoda
- Class: Insecta
- Order: Hemiptera
- Suborder: Sternorrhyncha
- Family: Diaspididae
- Subfamily: Aspidiotinae
- Tribe: Aspidiotini
- Genus: Morganella; Cockerell, 1897

Genus of true bugs

Morganella is a genus of scale insects in the family Diaspididae. Morganella longispina is the type species.

It is named for Albert C. F. Morgan, the entomologist who first described the type species in 1889 (as Aspidiotus longispina).

== Species ==
- Morganella acaciae Munting, 1967
- Morganella barbatissima Takagi, 2007
- Morganella conspicua Brain, 1919
- Morganella cueroensis Cockerell, 1899
- Morganella longispina Morgan, 1889
- Morganella polyctena Takagi, 2003
- Morganella pseudospinigera Balachowsky, 1956
- Morganella spinigera Lindinger, 1909

=== Other species formerly Morganella ===
- Morganella vuilleti or Morganella vuilletti now Sudanaspis vuilleti Marchal, 1909

Takagi has suggested that the other African species, M. acaciae, M. conspicua, M. pseudospinigera and M. spinigera, as well as the anomalous Morganella cueroensis, do not belong in Morganella.
