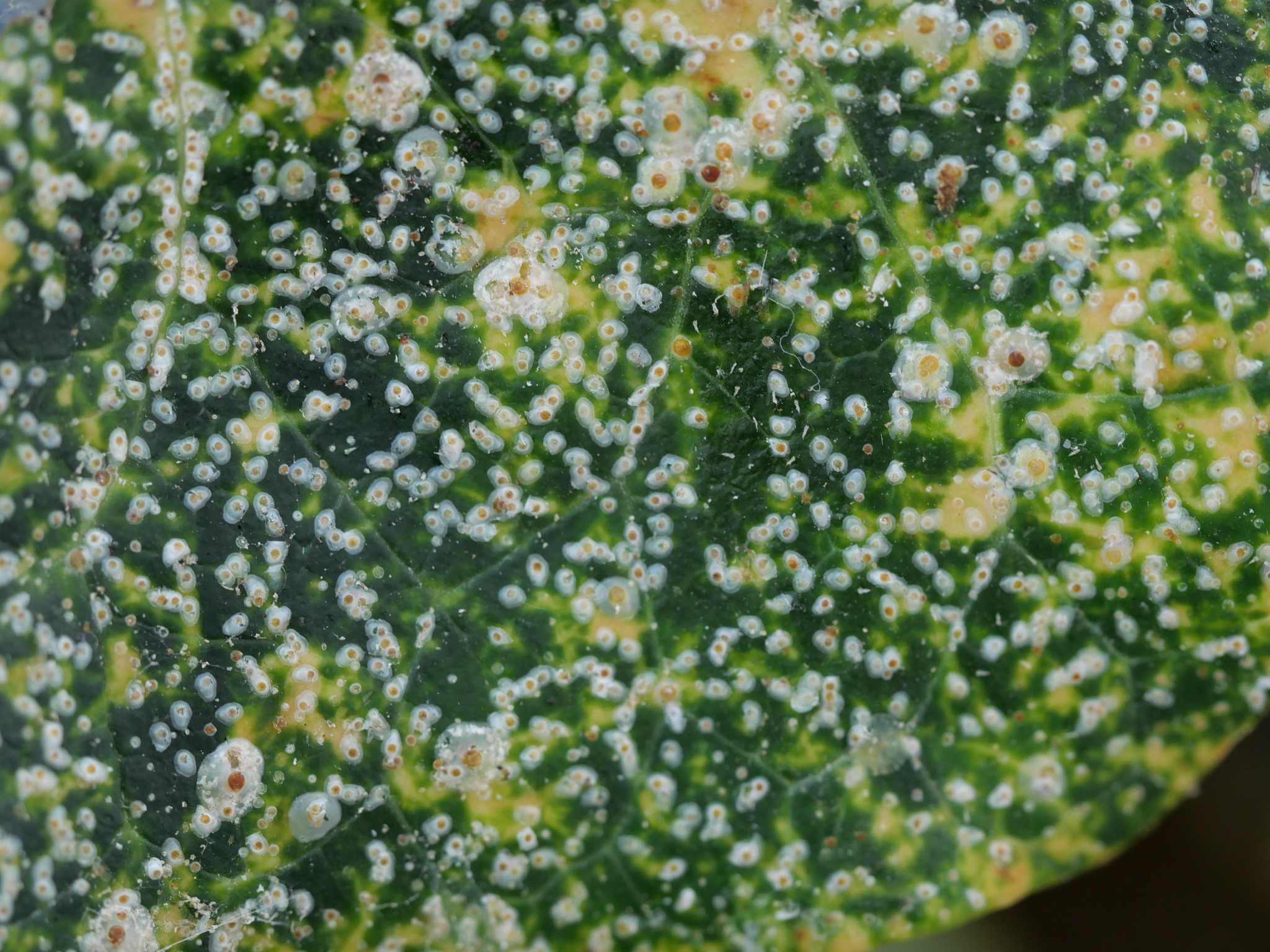
- Aspidiotus hedericola, Greece

Scientific classification
- Kingdom: Animalia
- Phylum: Arthropoda
- Class: Insecta
- Order: Hemiptera
- Suborder: Sternorrhyncha
- Family: Diaspididae
- Subtribe: Aspidiotina
- Genus: Aspidiotus; Bouché, 1833

Synonyms
- Aspidiotes Bouché, 1844; Diaspites Pampaloni, 1902; Evaspidiotus Leonardi, 1898

= Aspidiotus =

Genus of scale insects

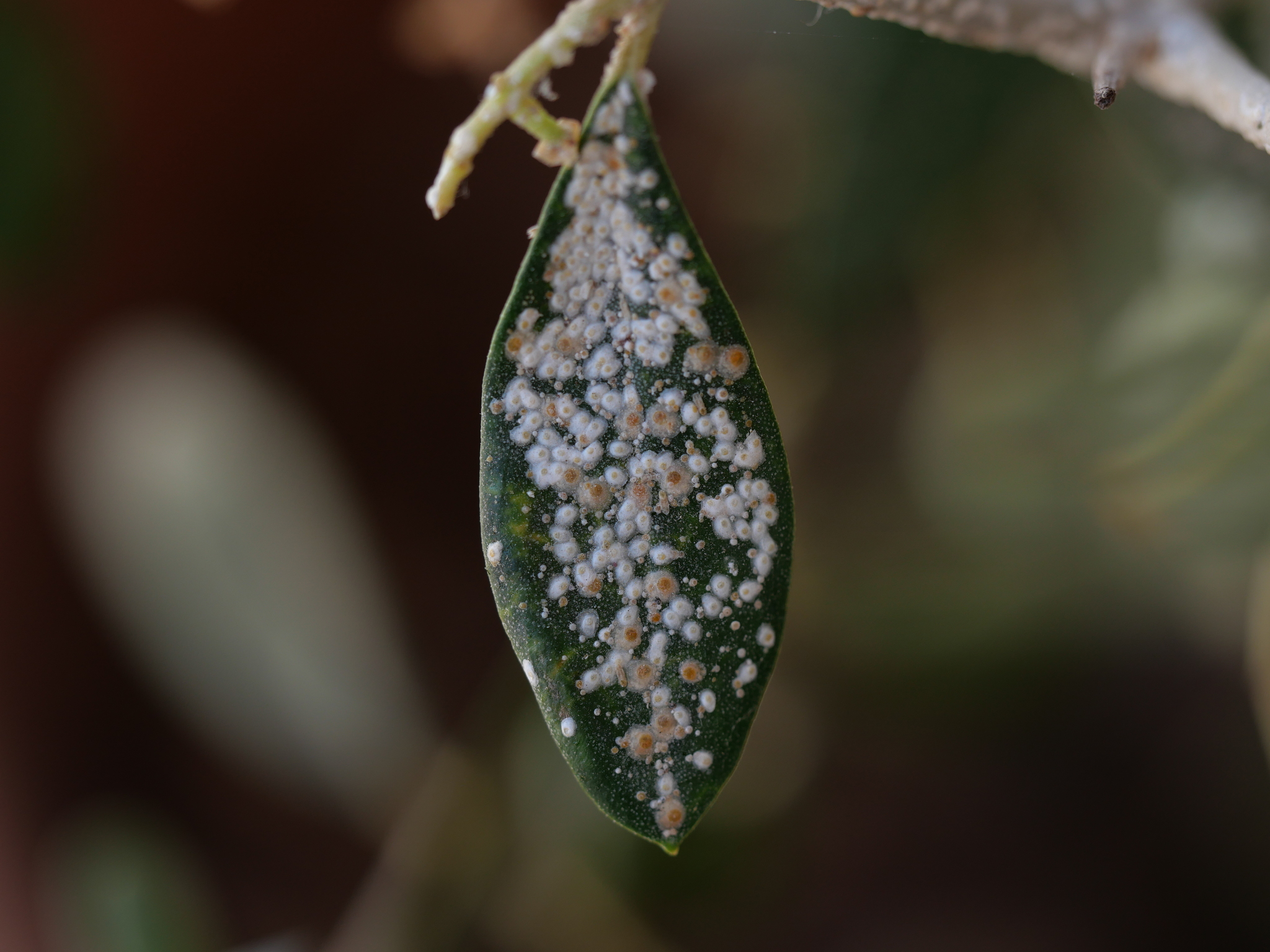
Aspidiotus nerii, Greece

Aspidiotus is a genus of armoured scales in the family Diaspididae. There are more than 100 described species in Aspidiotus.

== Species ==
These species belong to the genus Aspidiotus:

- Aspidiotus abietoides
- Aspidiotus aldabricus
- Aspidiotus anningensis Tang & Chu, 1983 (Cryptomeria Scale)
- Aspidiotus arrawatta Normark, Normark and Gullan, 2022
- Aspidiotus artus Munting, 1971
- Aspidiotus atomarius (Hall, 1946)
- Aspidiotus atripileus Munting, 1971
- Aspidiotus badius (Brain, 1919)
- Aspidiotus beilschmiediae Takagi, 1969
- Aspidiotus biafrae (Lindinger, 1909)
- Aspidiotus bornmuelleri Lindinger, 1911
- Aspidiotus brachystegiae Hall, 1928
- Aspidiotus capensis Newstead, 1917
- Aspidiotus capsulatus
- Aspidiotus cerasi Fitch, 1857
- Aspidiotus chaetachmeae (Brain, 1919)
- Aspidiotus chamaeropsis Signoret, 1869
- Aspidiotus chinensis Kuwana & Muramatsu, 1931
- Aspidiotus circularis Fitch, 1857
- Aspidiotus cochereaui Matile-Ferrero & Balachowsky, 1973
- Aspidiotus combreti Hall, 1928
- Aspidiotus commelinae
- Aspidiotus comorensis Mamet, 1960
- Aspidiotus comperei Marlatt, 1908
- Aspidiotus congolensis Balachowsky, 1956
- Aspidiotus corticalis
- Aspidiotus coryphae Cockerell & Robinson, 1915 (corypha scale)
- Aspidiotus crenulatus (Pampaloni, 1902)
- Aspidiotus cryptomeriae Kuwana, 1902 (Cryptomeria Scale)
- Aspidiotus cymbidii Bouche, 1844
- Aspidiotus dallonii Balachowsky, 1932
- Aspidiotus destructor Signoret, 1869 (coconut scale)
- Aspidiotus duplex (Cockerell, 1896)
- Aspidiotus elaeidis Marchal, 1909
- Aspidiotus excisus Green, 1896 (cyanotis scale)
- Aspidiotus flavus
- Aspidiotus fularum Balachowsky, 1956
- Aspidiotus furcillae Brain, 1918
- Aspidiotus furcraeicola Lindinger, 1910
- Aspidiotus gymnosporiae Lindinger, 1911
- Aspidiotus hedericola Leonardi, 1920
- Aspidiotus hoyae Takagi, 1969
- Aspidiotus hybridum
- Aspidiotus japonicus (Takagi, 1957)
- Aspidiotus juglandis Colvee, 1881
- Aspidiotus kamberra Normark, Normark and Gullan, 2022
- Aspidiotus kellyi Brain, 1918
- Aspidiotus kennedyae (Boisduval, 1867)
- Aspidiotus laticornis (Balachowsky, 1949)
- Aspidiotus lectularis
- Aspidiotus ligusticus Leonardi, 1918
- Aspidiotus macfarlanei Williams & Watson, 1988
- Aspidiotus maddisoni Williams & Watson, 1988
- Aspidiotus madecassus Mamet, 1954
- Aspidiotus maderensis Lindinger, 1912
- Aspidiotus marisci Tippins & Beshear, 1971
- Aspidiotus mespili
- Aspidiotus minutus Cockerell, 1892
- Aspidiotus moreirai Hempel, 1904
- Aspidiotus mousavii Moghaddam, 2018
- Aspidiotus msolonus Hall, 1929
- Aspidiotus murramarangensis Normark, Normark and Gullan, 2022
- Aspidiotus musae Williams & Watson, 1988
- Aspidiotus myoporii Lidgett, 1898
- Aspidiotus myrthi Bouche, 1851
- Aspidiotus mytiliformis
- Aspidiotus nerii Bouche, 1833 (Oleander scale)
- Aspidiotus niger Signoret, 1869
- Aspidiotus ophiopogonus Kuwana, 1932
- Aspidiotus pacificus Williams & Watson, 1988
- Aspidiotus palmarum Bouche, 1834
- Aspidiotus pandani (Boisduval, 1868)
- Aspidiotus paolii Balachowsky, 1956
- Aspidiotus philippinensis Velasquez, 1971 (Pandan scale)
- Aspidiotus phormii Signoret, 1869
- Aspidiotus populi Baerensprung, 1849
- Aspidiotus pothos Takagi, 1969
- Aspidiotus putearius Green, 1896
- Aspidiotus queenslandicus Brimblecombe, 1959
- Aspidiotus remaudierei Balachowsky, 1956
- Aspidiotus rhododendri
- Aspidiotus rhusae (Brain, 1919)
- Aspidiotus rigidus Reyne, 1947
- Aspidiotus riverae Cockerell, 1905
- Aspidiotus robiniae
- Aspidiotus ruandensis Balachowsky, 1955
- Aspidiotus saliceti Bouche, 1851
- Aspidiotus sclerosus (Munting, 1969)
- Aspidiotus selangorensis Hall & Williams, 1962
- Aspidiotus serratus Froggatt, 1914
- Aspidiotus simmondsi
- Aspidiotus simulans De Lotto, 1957
- Aspidiotus sinensis (Ferris, 1952)
- Aspidiotus spurcatus Signoret, 1869
- Aspidiotus suvaensis
- Aspidiotus symplocos Ramakrishna Ayyar, 1930
- Aspidiotus tafiranus Lindinger, 1912
- Aspidiotus tangfangtehi Ben-Dov in: Ben-Dov & German, 2003
- Aspidiotus taraxacus (Tang, 1984)
- Aspidiotus targionii Del Guercio, 1894
- Aspidiotus taverdeti Balachowsky, 1956
- Aspidiotus tiliae Bouche, 1851
- Aspidiotus tridentifer Ferris, 1941
- Aspidiotus tripinnatus
- Aspidiotus undulatus Lindinger, 1909
- Aspidiotus varians Lindinger, 1910
- Aspidiotus vernoniae Hall, 1929
- Aspidiotus watanabei Takagi, 1969
- Aspidiotus zizyphi Hall, 1929
