= Clavaspis =

Scientific classification
- Domain: Eukaryota
- Kingdom: Animalia
- Phylum: Arthropoda
- Class: Insecta
- Order: Hemiptera
- Suborder: Sternorrhyncha
- Family: Diaspididae
- Genus: Clavaspis; MacGillivray, 1921

Genus of bugs

Clavaspis is a genus of armoured scales in the family Diaspididae. There are more than 20 described species in Clavaspis.

== Species ==
These 22 species belong to the genus Clavaspis:

- Clavaspis barbigera Ferris, 1954 (barbigera scale)
- Clavaspis coursetiae (Marlatt, 1908) (pigeon plum scale)
- Clavaspis covilleae (Ferris, 1919) (covillea scale)
- Clavaspis crypta Howell & Tippins, 1975
- Clavaspis dentata Ferris, 1942
- Clavaspis disclusa Ferris, 1938 (decluse scale)
- Clavaspis herculeana (Cockerell & Hadden, {in}: Doane & Hadden, 1909) (herculeana scale)
- Clavaspis kalaharica Munting, 1969
- Clavaspis mori (Herrick, 1910)
- Clavaspis patagonensis Schneider, Claps, Wei, Normark & Normark, 2020
- Clavaspis pedilanthi (Ferris, 1921)
- Clavaspis perplexa Munting, 1971
- Clavaspis perseae (Davidson, 1964)
- Clavaspis pituranthi Williams, 1962
- Clavaspis quadriloba Brimblecombe, 1959
- Clavaspis selvatica Wei, Schneider, Normark & Normark, 2021
- Clavaspis subcuticularis (Green, 1916)
- Clavaspis subfervens (Green, 1904)
- Clavaspis subsimilis (Cockerell, 1899)
- Clavaspis texana Ferris, 1938
- Clavaspis ulmi (Johnson, 1896) (elm Aspidiotus)
- Clavaspis virolae Wei, Schneider, Normark & Normark, 2021
