= Acutaspis =

Scientific classification
- Domain: Eukaryota
- Kingdom: Animalia
- Phylum: Arthropoda
- Class: Insecta
- Order: Hemiptera
- Suborder: Sternorrhyncha
- Family: Diaspididae
- Genus: Acutaspis; Ferris, 1941

Genus of insects

Acutaspis is a genus of scale insects belonging to the family Diaspididae.

The species of this genus are found mainly in the Americas.

== Species ==
Species: These 18 species belong to the genus Acutaspis:

- Acutaspis acuta (Mamet, 1951) (Madagascar)
- Acutaspis agavis (Townsend & Cockerell, 1898) (North, Central, and South America)
- Acutaspis albopicta (Cockerell, 1898) (albopicta scale) (North, Central, and South America)
- Acutaspis aliena (Newstead, 1901) (Alien Scale)
- Acutaspis arbelaezi Balachowsky, 1959 (Colombia)
- Acutaspis decorosa Ferris, 1941 (Mexico)
- Acutaspis erythraspidis (Newstead, 1917) (Guyana)
- Acutaspis litorana Lepage, 1942 (Brazil)
- Acutaspis morrisonorum Kosztarab, 1963 (round conifer scale) (United States, Bermuda, Canada, Caribbean)
- Acutaspis oliveirae (Lepage & Giannotti, 1942) (Brazil)
- Acutaspis paulista (Hempel, 1900) (Brazil, Argentina)
- Acutaspis perseae (Comstock, 1881) (red bay scale)
- Acutaspis ramirezi Balachowsky, 1959 (Colombia)
- Acutaspis reniformis (Cockerell, 1897) (Mexico, Argentina)
- Acutaspis scutiformis (Cockerell, 1893) (Argentina, Guatemala, United States, Mexico, Brazil, Colombia)
- Acutaspis subnigra McKenzie, 1947 (Peru)
- Acutaspis tingi McKenzie, 1947 (Mexico)
- Acutaspis umbonifera (Newstead, 1920) (Guyana, Paraguay, Colombia, United States, Panama)
