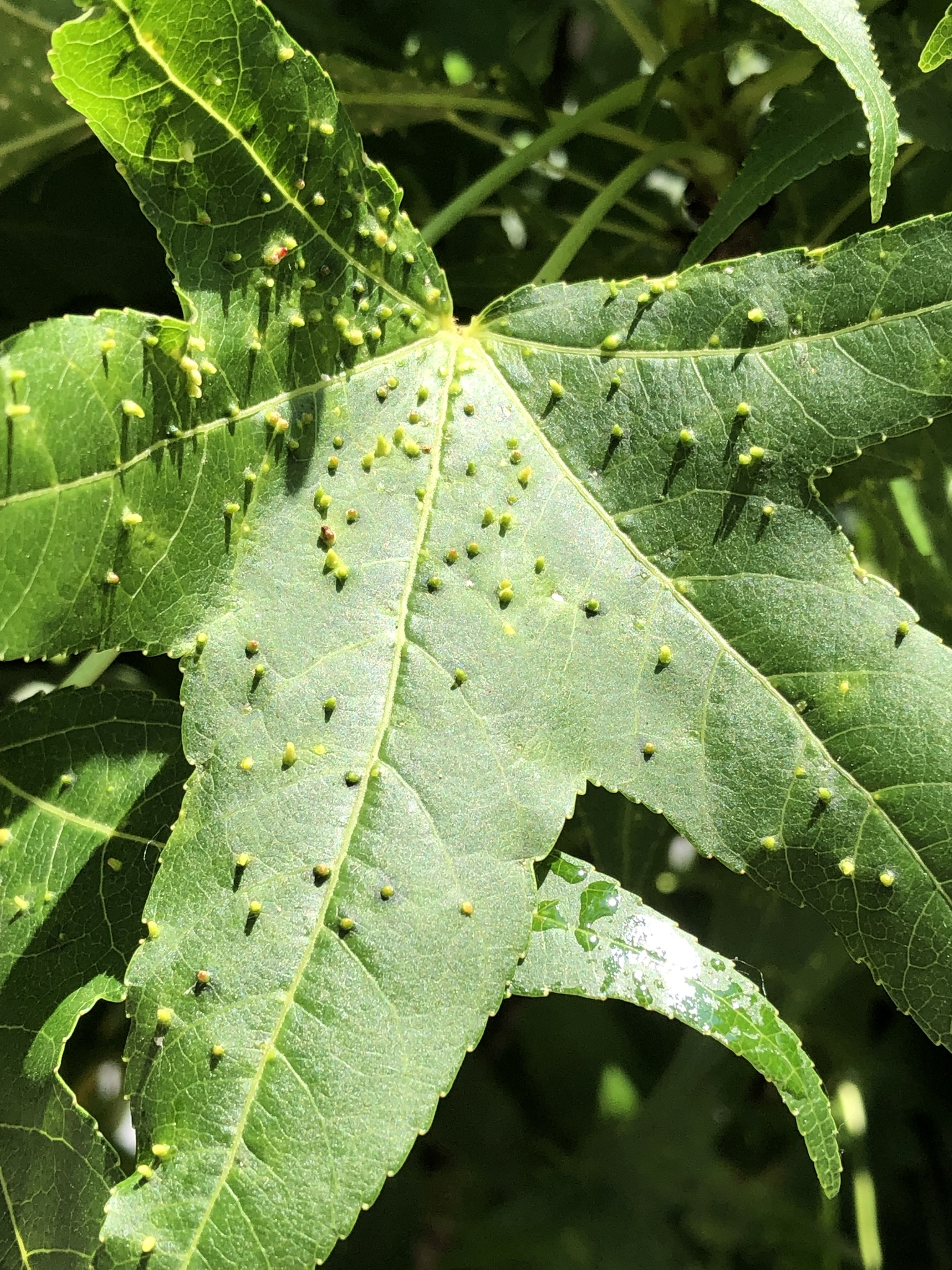
- Diaspidiotus liquidambaris, sweet gum scale, North Carolina

Scientific classification
- Domain: Eukaryota
- Kingdom: Animalia
- Phylum: Arthropoda
- Class: Insecta
- Order: Hemiptera
- Suborder: Sternorrhyncha
- Family: Diaspididae
- Genus: Diaspidiotus; Berlese, 1896

Synonyms
- Quadraspidiotus MacGillivray, 1921

= Diaspidiotus =

Genus of true bugs

Diaspidiotus is a genus of armoured scales in the family Diaspididae. There are more than 90 described species in Diaspidiotus, found worldwide.

== Species ==
These species belong to the genus Diaspidiotus:

- Diaspidiotus acutus (Borchsenius, 1964)
- Diaspidiotus aesculi (Johnson, 1896) (Buckeye scale)
- Diaspidiotus aetnensis Nucifora, Watson & Mazzeo, 2020
- Diaspidiotus africanus (Marlatt, 1908) (grey scale)
- Diaspidiotus alni (Marchal, 1909)
- Diaspidiotus anatolicus (Bodenheimer, 1949)
- Diaspidiotus ancylus (Putnam, 1878) (Howard scale)
- Diaspidiotus armenicus (Borchsenius, 1935)
- Diaspidiotus arroyoi (Balachowsky, 1968)
- Diaspidiotus atlanticus (Ferris, 1942)
- Diaspidiotus baiati (Kaussari, 1958)
- Diaspidiotus bavaricus (Lindinger, 1912)
- Diaspidiotus botanicus (Gómez-Menor Ortega, 1927)
- Diaspidiotus braunschvigi (Rungs, 1937) (braunschvigi scale)
- Diaspidiotus bumeliae Ferris, 1938
- Diaspidiotus caryae Kosztarab, 1963 (Hicory Scale)
- Diaspidiotus caucasicus (Borchsenius, 1935)
- Diaspidiotus cecconii (Leonardi, 1908)
- Diaspidiotus centrafricanus (Balachowsky & Ferrero, 1967)
- Diaspidiotus coniferarum (Cockerell, 1898) (conifer scale)
- Diaspidiotus convexus Goux, 1951
- Diaspidiotus cotoneastri (Takagi, 1975)
- Diaspidiotus cryptoxanthus (Cockerell, 1900)
- Diaspidiotus cryptus (Ferris, 1953)
- Diaspidiotus crystallinus Ferris, 1938
- Diaspidiotus danzigae Kuznetsov, 1976
- Diaspidiotus degeneratus (Leonardi, 1896)
- Diaspidiotus distinctus (Leonardi, 1900)
- Diaspidiotus ehrhorni (Coleman, 1903) (Ehrhorn scale)
- Diaspidiotus elaeagni (Borchsenius, 1939)
- Diaspidiotus eurotiae (Bazarov, 1967)
- Diaspidiotus fabernii (Houser, 1918)
- Diaspidiotus farahbakhchi Kaussari, 1955
- Diaspidiotus forbesi (Johnson, 1896) (Forbes scale)
- Diaspidiotus fraxini (McKenzie, 1944)
- Diaspidiotus gigas (Thiem & Gerneck, 1934)
- Diaspidiotus hydrangeae Takagi, 1974
- Diaspidiotus inusitatus (Munting, 1969)
- Diaspidiotus iranicus Kaussari & Balachowsky, 1953
- Diaspidiotus jaapi (Leonardi, 1920)
- Diaspidiotus juglansregiae (Comstock, 1881) (English walnut scale)
- Diaspidiotus kafkai (Cockerell, 1898)
- Diaspidiotus kaussari Balachowsky, 1950
- Diaspidiotus kuwanai Takahashi, 1952
- Diaspidiotus labiatarum (Marchal, 1909)
- Diaspidiotus laperrinei (Balachowsky, 1929)
- Diaspidiotus laurinus (Lindinger, 1912)
- Diaspidiotus leguminosum (Archangelskaya, 1937)
- Diaspidiotus lenticularis (Lindinger, 1912)
- Diaspidiotus lepineyi (Balachowsky, 1950)
- Diaspidiotus liaoningensis (Tang, 1984)
- Diaspidiotus liquidambaris (Kotinsky, 1903) (sweet gum scale)
- Diaspidiotus mairei (Balachowsky, 1928)
- Diaspidiotus makii (Kuwana, 1932)
- Diaspidiotus malenconi (Rungs, 1936)
- Diaspidiotus maleti (Vayssière, 1920)
- Diaspidiotus marani (Zahradník, 1952)
- Diaspidiotus marginalis (Brain, 1919)
- Diaspidiotus maroccanus (Balachowsky, 1949)
- Diaspidiotus mccombi McKenzie, 1963 (McComb pine scale)
- Diaspidiotus mesembryanthemae (Brain, 1919)
- Diaspidiotus naracola Takagi, 1956
- Diaspidiotus nitrariae (Marchal, 1911)
- Diaspidiotus opertus (De Lotto, 1957)
- Diaspidiotus osborni (Newell & Cockerell, in: Osborn, 1898) (Osborn scale)
- Diaspidiotus ostreaeformis (Curtis, 1843) (European fruit scale)
- Diaspidiotus paraphyses (Takagi, 1956)
- Diaspidiotus perieri (Goux, 1949)
- Diaspidiotus perniciabilus Wang & Zhang, 1994
- Diaspidiotus piceus (Sanders, 1904)
- Diaspidiotus platychaetae Takagi & Moghaddam, 2005
- Diaspidiotus prunorum (Laing, 1931)
- Diaspidiotus pseudocamelliae (Green, 1919)
- Diaspidiotus pyri (Lichtenstein, 1881)
- Diaspidiotus roseni Danzig, 2000
- Diaspidiotus salicis (Lupo, 1953)
- Diaspidiotus shastae (Coleman, 1903)
- Diaspidiotus simplex (Leonardi, 1914)
- Diaspidiotus slavonicus (Green, 1934)
- Diaspidiotus socialis (Hoke, 1927)
- Diaspidiotus sphaerocarpae (Balachowsky, 1934)
- Diaspidiotus spiraspinae Takagi, 1956
- Diaspidiotus sulci (Balachowsky, 1950)
- Diaspidiotus taxodii (Ferris, 1938) (bald cypress scale)
- Diaspidiotus ternstroemiae (Ferris, 1952)
- Diaspidiotus thymbrae (Koroneos, 1934)
- Diaspidiotus thymicola (Balachowsky, 1935)
- Diaspidiotus tillandsiae (Takagi & Tippins, 1972)
- Diaspidiotus transcaspiensis (Marlatt, 1908)
- Diaspidiotus turanicus (Borchsenius, 1935)
- Diaspidiotus uvae (Comstock, 1881) (grape scale)
- Diaspidiotus visci (Hall, 1931)
- Diaspidiotus viticola (Leonardi, 1913)
- Diaspidiotus wuenni (Lindinger, 1923)
- Diaspidiotus xinjiangensis Tang, 1984
- Diaspidiotus yomae (Munting, 1971)
- Diaspidiotus zonatus (Frauenfeld, 1868)
