= Aspidioides =

Scientific classification
- Domain: Eukaryota
- Kingdom: Animalia
- Phylum: Arthropoda
- Class: Insecta
- Order: Hemiptera
- Suborder: Sternorrhyncha
- Family: Diaspididae
- Genus: Aspidioides; MacGillivray, 1921
- Species: A. corokiae

Binomial name
- Aspidioides corokiae (Maskell, 1891)

Genus of insects

Aspidioides is a monotypic genus of true bugs belonging to the family Diaspididae. The only species is Aspidioides corokiae.
