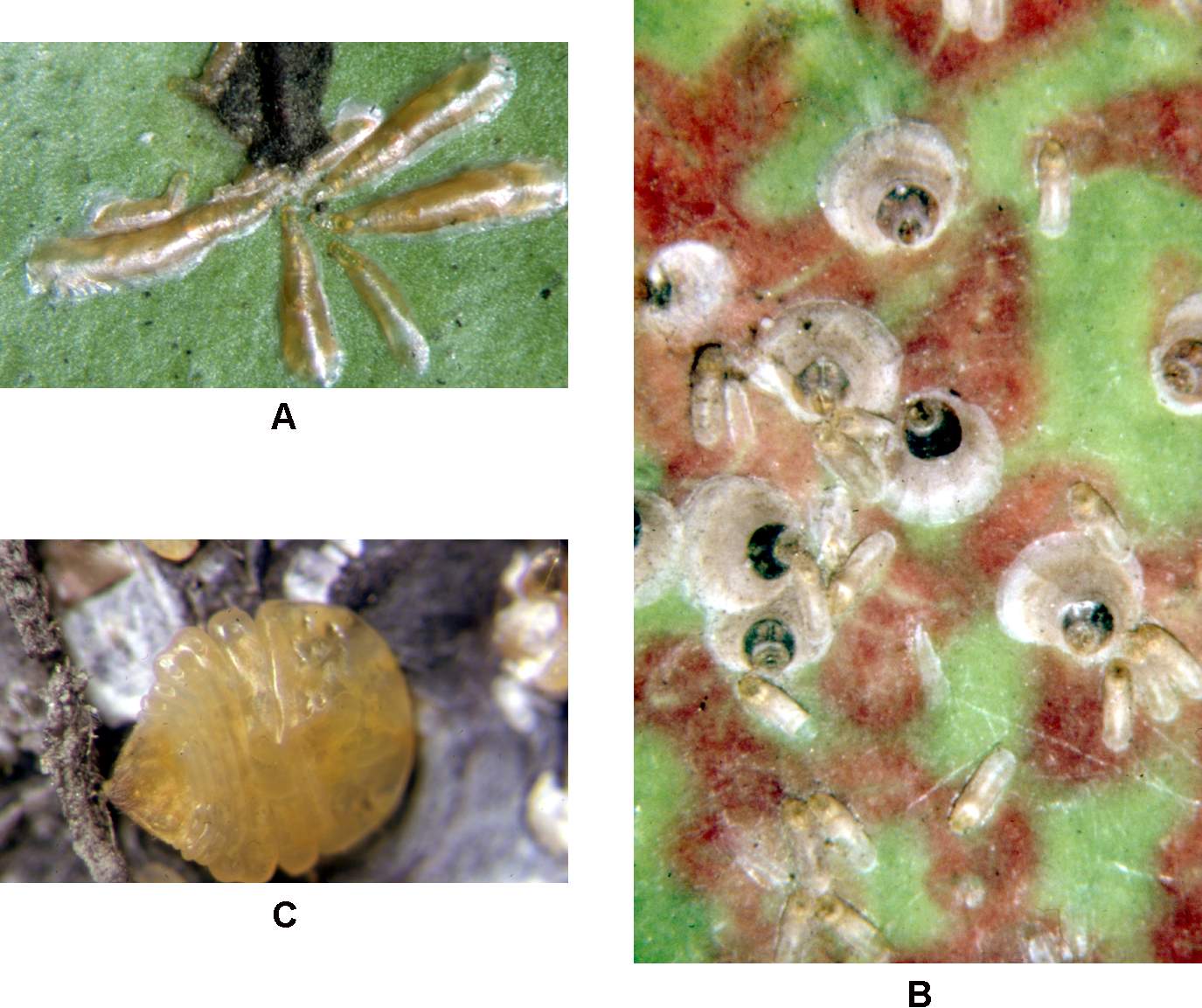
- Three species of armored scales

Scientific classification
- Kingdom: Animalia
- Phylum: Arthropoda
- Class: Insecta
- Order: Hemiptera
- Suborder: Sternorrhyncha
- Superfamily: Coccoidea
- Family: Diaspididae; Maskell, 1878

= Diaspididae =

Family of true bugs

Diaspididae is the largest family of scale insects with over 2650 described species in around 400 genera. As with all scale insects, the female produces a waxy protective scale beneath which it feeds on its host plant. Diaspidid scales are far more substantial than those of most other families, incorporating the exuviae from the first two nymphal instars and sometimes faecal matter and fragments of the host plant. These can be complex and extremely waterproof structures rather resembling a suit of armor. For this reason these insects are commonly referred to as armored scale insects. As it is so robust and firmly attached to the host plant, the scale often persists long after the insect has died.

Some African Diaspididae are attended by ants of genus Melissotarsus. The ants appear to consume the armored scales because Diaspididae are completely naked when ant-attended; the ant nest itself remains completely hidden under the bark of the tree.

== Selected species ==
Notable species include:

- Abgrallaspis cyanophylli, the cyanophyllum scale
- Aonidiella aurantii, the California red scale
- Aonidomytilus crookiae the St. John's Wort scale
- Aulacaspis yasumatsui, the cycad aulacaspis scale
- Carulaspis minima, the minute cypress scale
- Diaspidiotus perniciosus, the San Jose scale
- Hemiberlesia lataniae, the latania or palm scale
- Lepidosaphes beckii, the citrus mussel scale
- Lepidosaphes ulmi, the oystershell scale
- Quadraspidiotus juglansregiae, the walnut scale

== Subfamilies ==
The classification of the subfamilies and tribes of Diaspididae has varied in recent years. Research published in 2019 classified the subfamilies and tribes of Diaspididae as follows:

Subfamily Ancepaspidinae (New World, 6 genera)
Subfamily Aspidiotinae

Tribe Aonidiini (Old World, mostly Australasian and Oriental, 36 genera)
Tribe Aspidiotini (cosmopolitan, 88 genera)
Tribe Gymnaspidini (Neotropical, 3 genera)
Tribe Leucaspidini (almost exclusively Old World, 11 genera)
Tribe Odonaspidini (mostly Oriental, 5 genera)
Tribe Parlatoriini (mostly Oriental, 25 genera)
Tribe Smilacicolini (Oriental, 1 genus)

Subfamily Diaspidinae

Tribe Lepidosaphidini (cosmopolitan, 103 genera)
Tribe Diaspidini

Subtribe Chionaspidina (cosmopolitan except South America, 48 genera)
Subtribe Diaspidina (cosmopolitan except Australasia, 13 genera)
Subtribe Fioriniina (almost exclusively Old World, 64 genera)

Subfamily Furcaspidinae (Pantropical, 1 genus)

== See also ==
List of Diaspididae genera
