= Phaenochilus =

Scientific classification
- Kingdom: Animalia
- Phylum: Arthropoda
- Clade: Pancrustacea
- Class: Insecta
- Order: Coleoptera
- Suborder: Polyphaga
- Infraorder: Cucujiformia
- Family: Coccinellidae
- Subfamily: Coccinellinae
- Tribe: Chilocorini
- Genus: Phaenochilus; Weise 1895

Genus of beetles

Phaenochilus is a genus of lady beetles in the family Coccinellidae. There are about 10 described species in Phaenochilus. It is found in Southeast Asia, India, and Japan.

== Species ==
These species belong to the genus Phaenochilus:

- Phaenochilus flaviceps Miyatake 1970
- Phaenochilus indicus Miyatake 1970
- Phaenochilus kashaya Giorgi & Vandenberg, 2012
- Phaenochilus metasternalis Miyatake 1970
- Phaenochilus mikado Lewis 1896
- Phaenochilus monostigma Weise 1895
- Phaenochilus punctifrons Weise 1895
- Phaenochilus renipunctus Chapin 1965
- Phaenochilus ruficollis Weise 1885

== Selected former species ==
- Phaenochilus albomarginalis Li & Wang, 2017
