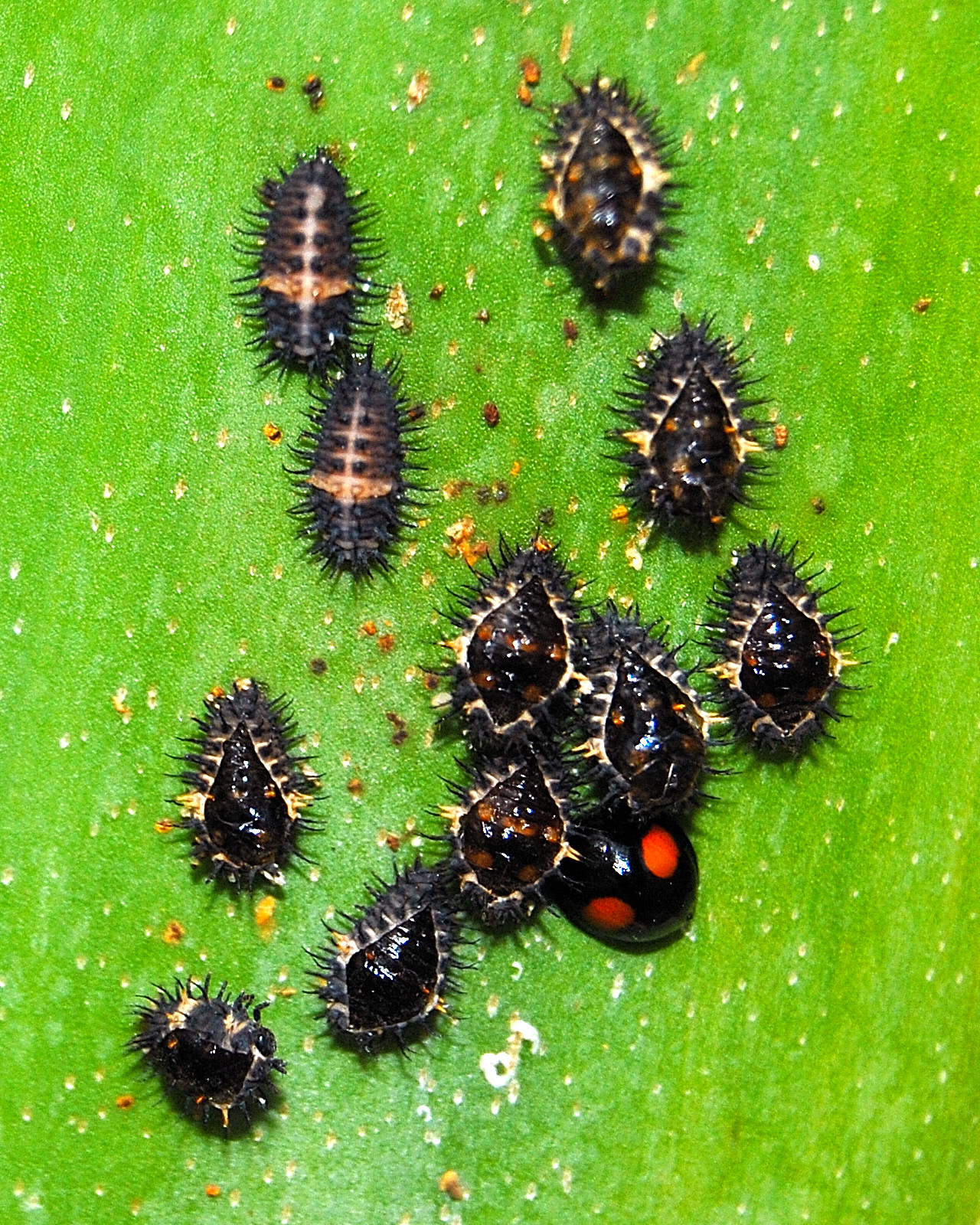
- Larvae, pupae and adult

Scientific classification
- Kingdom: Animalia
- Phylum: Arthropoda
- Clade: Pancrustacea
- Class: Insecta
- Order: Coleoptera
- Suborder: Polyphaga
- Infraorder: Cucujiformia
- Family: Coccinellidae
- Genus: Chilocorus
- Species: C. cacti

Binomial name
- Chilocorus cacti (Linnaeus, 1767)

Synonyms
- Coccinella cacti Linnaeus, 1767; Chilocorus confusor Casey, 1899

= Chilocorus cacti =

Species of beetle

Chilocorus cacti, known generally as the cactus lady beetle or the twice-stabbed cactus lady beetle, is a species of lady beetle in the family Coccinellidae. It is native to the Caribbean region, North America, Central America, and South America. The adults and larvae feed on scale insects, and attempts have been made to use it for biological pest control.

== Description ==
The eggs of Chilocorus cacti are about 1 mm (0.04 in) long, oval and grey. The larvae are cylindrical and moult three times, the fourth instar larva being about 6 mm (0.24 in) long; the larvae are black, with a yellowish-brown girdle, and have large black spines on the dorsal surface. The pupae are diamond-shaped, about 5 mm (0.20 in) long, mottled black and brown, and also spiny. The adult is domed, up to 6 mm (0.24 in) long, a glossy black colour with two large reddish-brown spots on the elytra. This lady beetle is similar in appearance to Chilocorus stigma, but the ventral surface is a burnt orange whereas that of C. stigma is black.

== Distribution and habitat ==
Chilocorus cacti is native to the New World, where its range includes the southern United States, Mexico, Colombia, Peru and the Caribbean region. It has become established in South Africa, Eswatini, Morocco and São Tomé and Príncipe, India and New Zealand. This lady beetle is often found on prickly pear cacti (Opuntia), and on various trees, especially coconut palms.

== Ecology ==
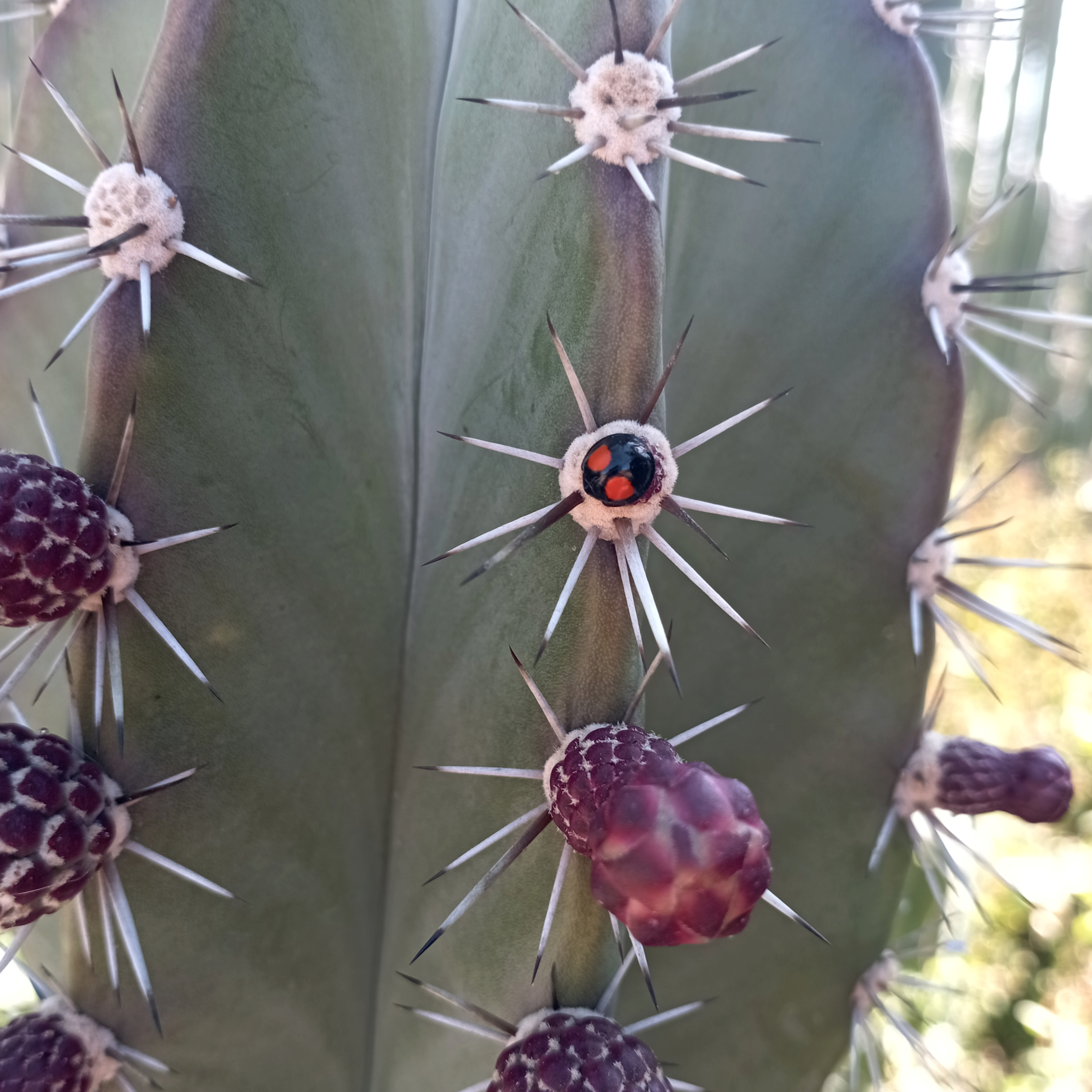
C. cacti on a Stenocereus sp.

Both adults and larvae of this lady beetle are predators, feeding on scale insects; the species consumed vary with location but include Aonidiella aurantii, Aspidiotus destructor, Carulaspis minima, Coccus viridis, Melanaspis glomerata, Parlatoria blanchardi, Pseudaulacaspis pentagona, Selenaspidus articulatus, Hemiberlesia lataniae and Aulacaspis yasumatsui, many of which are major pests of citrus and other crops. Besides scale insects, it consumes other pests, such as the psyllid Diaphorina citri on citrus.

The eggs are laid close to a suitable prey species and hatch in about ten days. The larvae feed for about 17 days before pupating, and the adults emerge about 13 days later. In the United States, the insects have no natural enemies, perhaps being avoided by birds and lizards because of an offensive odour. The black and red colouring indicates to potential predators that they are distasteful.

This lady beetle has been used with mixed success in attempts at biological pest control in several countries.
