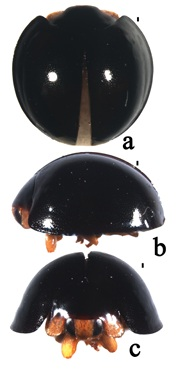

Scientific classification
- Kingdom: Animalia
- Phylum: Arthropoda
- Clade: Pancrustacea
- Class: Insecta
- Order: Coleoptera
- Suborder: Polyphaga
- Infraorder: Cucujiformia
- Family: Coccinellidae
- Genus: Chilocorus
- Species: C. nigritus

Binomial name
- Chilocorus nigritus (Fabricius, 1798)

Synonyms
- Coccinella nigrita Fabricius, 1798; Orcus cerberus Mulsant, 1856; Chilocorus nigrita

= Chilocorus nigritus =

Species of beetle

Chilocorus nigritus (formerly known as Chilocorus nigrita), sometimes referred to as the Malaysian ladybird beetle, is a species of lady beetle in the family Coccinellidae. It is native to SE Asia, but has been introduced for use in biological pest control in Hawaii and many parts of the world, including Europe.

== Distribution ==
It is found in Agalega, American Samoa, Benin, Bermuda, Brazil, Eswatini, Ghana, Guam, Hawaii, India, Indonesia, Israel, Italy, Kenya, Madagascar, Malaysia, Marshall Islands, Mauritius, Mozambique, Myanmar, Nepal, New Caledonia, Oman, Pakistan, Reunion Island, Seychelles, Society Islands, Solomon Islands, South Africa, Sri Lanka, Tanzania, Togo, Turkey, Uganda, United States, Vanuatu and Zimbabwe.

== Description ==
The species is similar to Chilocorus subindicus in morphology.

== Biology ==
It is one of the major predators on diaspid scale insects such as Aonidiella aurantii, Abgrallaspis cyanophylli, Aleurotrachelus atratus, Aonidiella citrina, Aspidiotus rigidus, Chrysomphalus aonidum, Lepidosaphes gloverii, Parasaissetia nigra, Parlatoria blanchardi, Saccharicoccus sacchari, Aonidiella orientalis, Aspidiotus destructor, Hemiberiesia latanias, Leucaspis coniferarum, Pinnaspis strachani, Quadraspidiotus perniciosus, Tecaspis.
