= Chilocorus hexacyclus =

Scientific classification
- Kingdom: Animalia
- Phylum: Arthropoda
- Clade: Pancrustacea
- Class: Insecta
- Order: Coleoptera
- Suborder: Polyphaga
- Infraorder: Cucujiformia
- Family: Coccinellidae
- Genus: Chilocorus
- Species: C. hexacyclus

Binomial name
- Chilocorus hexacyclus Smith, 1959

Species of beetle

Chilocorus hexacyclus is a species of beetle in the family Coccinellidae. It is found in North America, where it has been recorded from Alberta and Saskatchewan.

== Description ==
Adults are nearly identical to Chilocorus stigma.
