= Chilocorus fraternus =

Scientific classification
- Kingdom: Animalia
- Phylum: Arthropoda
- Clade: Pancrustacea
- Class: Insecta
- Order: Coleoptera
- Suborder: Polyphaga
- Infraorder: Cucujiformia
- Family: Coccinellidae
- Genus: Chilocorus
- Species: C. fraternus

Binomial name
- Chilocorus fraternus LeConte, 1860

Species of beetle

Chilocorus fraternus is a species of lady beetle in the family Coccinellidae. It is native to North America, where it has been recorded from California.

== Description ==
Adults reach a length of about 3.40-5.10 mm. Adults are nearly identical to Chilocorus orbus.
