= Chilocorus pakistanensis =

Scientific classification
- Kingdom: Animalia
- Phylum: Arthropoda
- Clade: Pancrustacea
- Class: Insecta
- Order: Coleoptera
- Suborder: Polyphaga
- Infraorder: Cucujiformia
- Family: Coccinellidae
- Genus: Chilocorus
- Species: C. pakistanensis

Binomial name
- Chilocorus pakistanensis (Ahmad & Ghani, 1966)

Synonyms
- Simmondsius pakistanensis Ahmad & Ghani, 1966

Species of beetle

Chilocorus pakistanensis is a species of beetle of the family Coccinellidae. It is found in India (Uttarakhand, Jammu & Kashmir) and Pakistan.

== Description ==
Adults reach a length of about 3.6–4.5 mm (0.14–0.18 in). The head is blackish blue with greyish hairs, while the pronotum and elytra are metallic greenish blue to blue and glabrous.

== Life history ==
They have been recorded preying on Aphis pomi, Aonidiella orientalis, Comstockaspis perniciosa and Leucaspis coniferarum.
