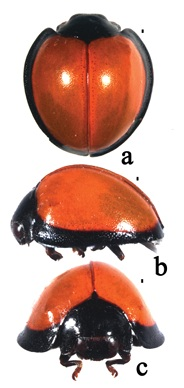

Scientific classification
- Kingdom: Animalia
- Phylum: Arthropoda
- Clade: Pancrustacea
- Class: Insecta
- Order: Coleoptera
- Suborder: Polyphaga
- Infraorder: Cucujiformia
- Family: Coccinellidae
- Genus: Chilocorus
- Species: C. hauseri

Binomial name
- Chilocorus hauseri Weise, 1895

= Chilocorus hauseri =

Species of beetle

Chilocorus hauseri is a species of beetle of the family Coccinellidae. It is found in India (Sikkim, West Bengal, Manipur), Myanmar, Laos, Vietnam and China (Fujian, Guangdong, Hainan, Sichuan, Yunnan).

== Description ==
Adults reach a length of about 4.2–4.45 mm (0.165–0.175 in). The head and pronotum are black, while the elytra are ochreous yellow or reddish brown, with black borders.

== Life history ==
They have been recorded preying on Aonidiella aurantii, Aonidiella orientalis, Chrysomphalus aonidum and Aphis odinae.
