= Melanaspis glomerata =

Scientific classification
- Kingdom: Animalia
- Phylum: Arthropoda
- Class: Insecta
- Order: Hemiptera
- Suborder: Sternorrhyncha
- Family: Diaspididae
- Subtribe: Aspidiotina
- Genus: Melanaspis
- Species: M. glomerata

Binomial name
- Melanaspis glomerata (Green, 1903)

Synonyms
- Aonidiella glomerata MacGillivray, 1921; Aspidiotus glomeratus Green, 1903; Targionia glomerata Fernald, 1903

Species of true bug

Melanaspis glomerata, the sugarcane scale or black scale, is a species of armoured scale insect in the family Diaspididae. It is native to the Indian subcontinent where it is a serious pest of sugarcane.

== Description ==
When first hatched, the nymphs are known as "crawlers" and move to other parts of the plant, particularly the young growth beneath the leaf sheaths. This is the only life cycle stage that is mobile because other stages pierce the plant tissues with their mouthparts and remain in one place. Female insects are roughly circular, the soft body being concealed under a slightly convex, greyish-brown or blackish test or scale. Male insects have a smaller, more oval test.

== Distribution ==
Melanaspis glomerata occurs in Pakistan, India and Bangladesh.

== Ecology ==
The primary host of Melanaspis glomerata is Saccharum officinarum (sugarcane). The insect is very small and the main evidence of its presence is greyish patches on the midribs of the leaves and on the stems, where most of the insects may be concealed under the leaf sheaths. The scales are often so crowded together as to make them difficult to discern individually. The cumulative presence of so many insects sucking its sap weakens the plant and reduces the sucrose and dry matter content of the crop. Heavy infestations can cause decay and death of the stalks. Natural enemies of this scale include Rhyzobius lophanthae, Chilocorus cacti, and several other species of lady beetle, and the thrips Podothrips lucasseni. The insects are also parasitised by Trichogramma japonicum and other small parasitic wasps.
