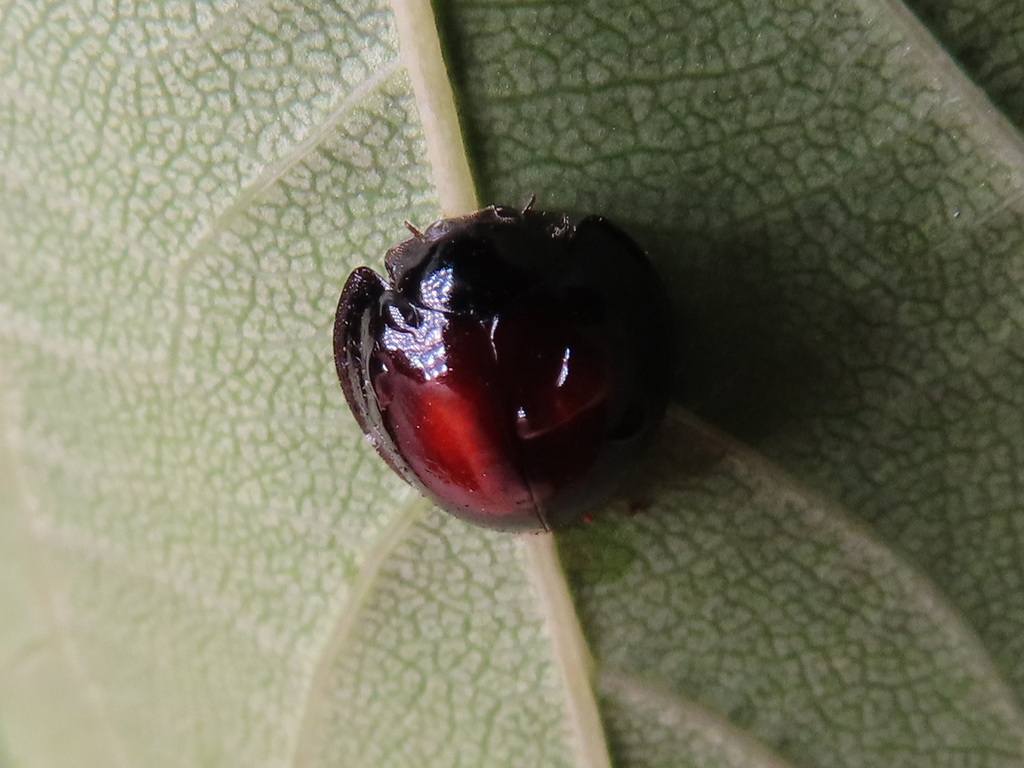

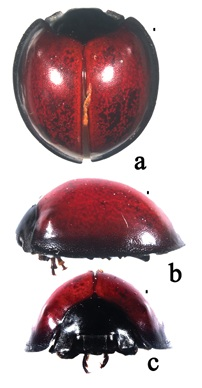

Scientific classification
- Kingdom: Animalia
- Phylum: Arthropoda
- Clade: Pancrustacea
- Class: Insecta
- Order: Coleoptera
- Suborder: Polyphaga
- Infraorder: Cucujiformia
- Family: Coccinellidae
- Genus: Chilocorus
- Species: C. rubidus

Binomial name
- Chilocorus rubidus Hope in Gray, 1831

Synonyms
- Chilocorus rubidus var. fenestratus Weise, 1887; Chilocorus rubidus var. niger Weise, 1887; Coccinella tristis Faldermann, 1835

= Chilocorus rubidus =

Species of beetle

Chilocorus rubidus is a species of beetle of the family Coccinellidae. It is found in India (Himachal Pradesh, Jammu & Kashmir, Manipur, Nagaland, Uttarakhand, Uttar Pradesh, West Bengal), Nepal, Pakistan, Malaysia, Indonesia (Sulawesi), Vietnam, Mongolia, Japan, the Russian Far East and China (Beijing, Tianjin, Hebei, Inner Mongolia, Liaoning, Jilin, Heilongjiang, Jiangsu, Zhejiang, Fujian, Shandong, Henan, Hunan, Hainan, Sichuan, Guizhou, Yunnan, Tibet, Shaanxi, Gansu, Ningxia).

== Description ==
Adults reach a length of about 5.8–7.2 mm (0.23–0.28 in). The head, pronotum and scutellum are black, while the elytra are dark burgundy or beet red or reddish brown, with blackish lateral margins. The ventral surface is mostly dark reddish brown.

== Life history ==
They have been recorded preying on scale insects damaging trees and shrubs.
