= Chilocorus braeti =

Scientific classification
- Kingdom: Animalia
- Phylum: Arthropoda
- Clade: Pancrustacea
- Class: Insecta
- Order: Coleoptera
- Suborder: Polyphaga
- Infraorder: Cucujiformia
- Family: Coccinellidae
- Genus: Chilocorus
- Species: C. braeti

Binomial name
- Chilocorus braeti Weise, 1895

Species of beetle

Chilocorus braeti is a species of beetle of the family Coccinellidae. It is found in India (Tripura, Meghalaya, West Bengal, Sikkim), Vietnam and Laos.

== Description ==
Adults reach a length of about 4.2–5.5 mm (0.17–0.22 in). They are uniform black. The elytra have a finely punctate disc and coarsely punctate lateral margins.
