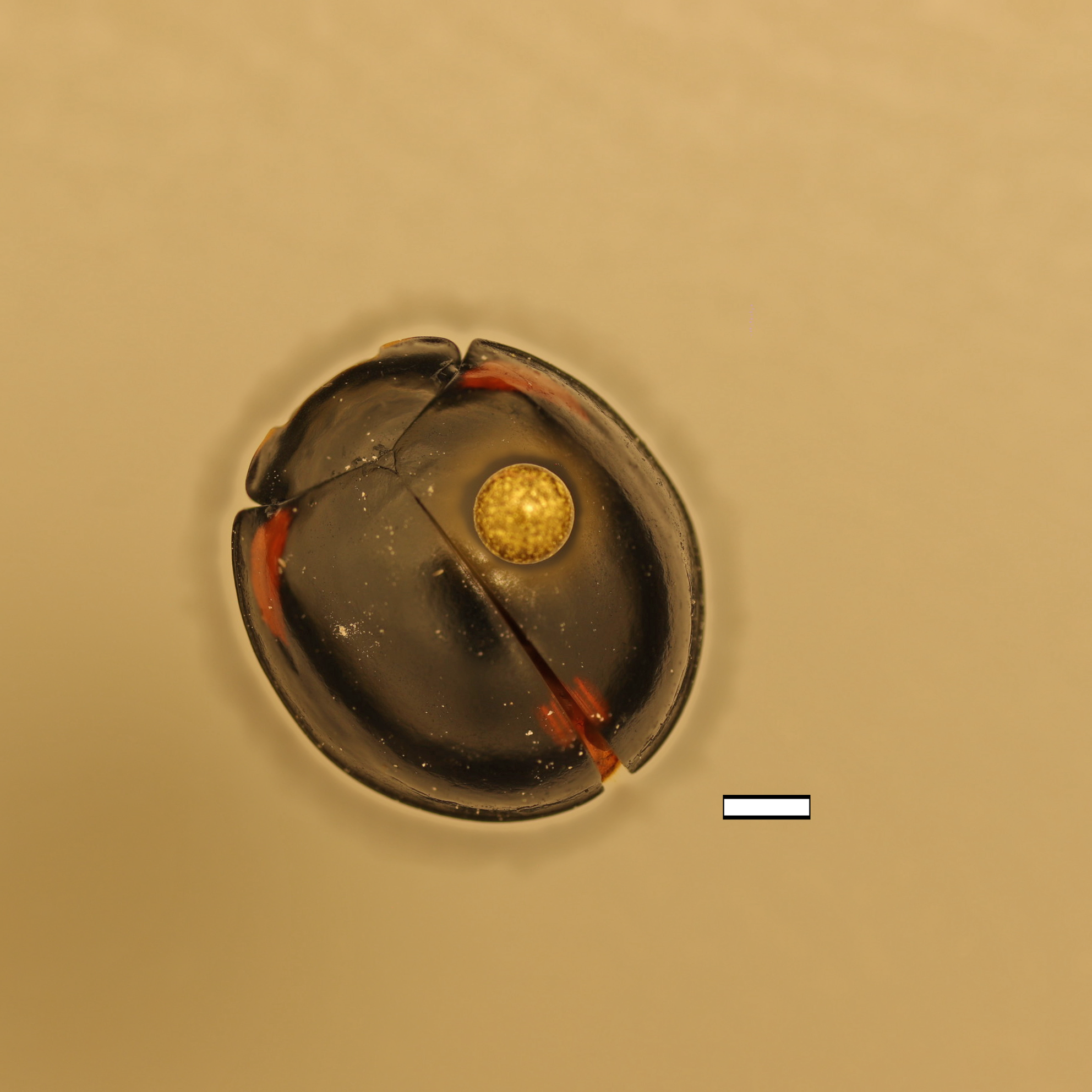
- Pinned specimen of Axion tripustulatum

Scientific classification
- Kingdom: Animalia
- Phylum: Arthropoda
- Clade: Pancrustacea
- Class: Insecta
- Order: Coleoptera
- Suborder: Polyphaga
- Infraorder: Cucujiformia
- Family: Coccinellidae
- Tribe: Chilocorini
- Genus: Axion; Mulsant, 1850

= Axion (beetle) =

Genus of beetles

Axion is a genus of lady beetles in the family Coccinellidae. There are at least two described species in Axion.

== Species ==
- Axion plagiatum (Olivier, 1808)
- Axion tripustulatum (De Geer, 1775) (three-spotted lady beetle)
