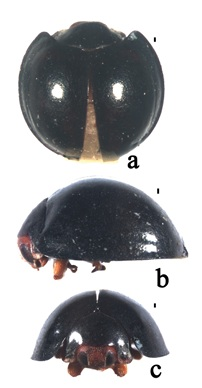

Scientific classification
- Kingdom: Animalia
- Phylum: Arthropoda
- Clade: Pancrustacea
- Class: Insecta
- Order: Coleoptera
- Suborder: Polyphaga
- Infraorder: Cucujiformia
- Family: Coccinellidae
- Genus: Chilocorus
- Species: C. melas

Binomial name
- Chilocorus melas Weise, 1898

Synonyms
- Chilocorus gressitti Miyatake, 1970

= Chilocorus melas =

Species of beetle

Chilocorus melas is a species of beetle of the family Coccinellidae. It is found in India (Sikkim, West Bengal), Bhutan, Thailand, Vietnam, Malaysia, Indonesia and China (Fujian, Guangdong, Guangxi, Hainan, Sichuan, Yunnan, Hongkong).

== Description ==
Adults reach a length of about 3.1–3.8 mm (0.12–0.15 in). The head is dark brown to blackish with an anterior yellowish brown area in females, which is largely yellowish in males. The pronotum is blackish to dark brownish or piceous with a lighter brown anterior margin.

== Life history ==
They have been recorded preying on Coccus viridis.
