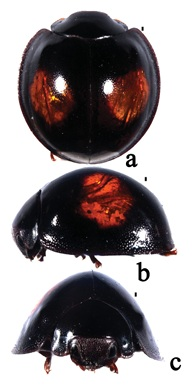

Scientific classification
- Kingdom: Animalia
- Phylum: Arthropoda
- Clade: Pancrustacea
- Class: Insecta
- Order: Coleoptera
- Suborder: Polyphaga
- Infraorder: Cucujiformia
- Family: Coccinellidae
- Genus: Chilocorus
- Species: C. hupehanus

Binomial name
- Chilocorus hupehanus Miyatake, 1970

= Chilocorus hupehanus =

Species of beetle

Chilocorus hupehanus is a species of beetle of the family Coccinellidae. It is found in China (Zhejiang, Fujian, Shandong, Hubei, Hunan, Sichuan, Guizhou, Guangdong, Guangxi, Gansu).
