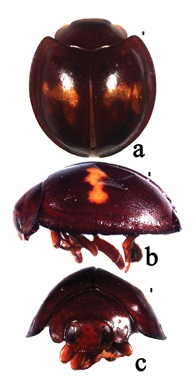

Scientific classification
- Kingdom: Animalia
- Phylum: Arthropoda
- Clade: Pancrustacea
- Class: Insecta
- Order: Coleoptera
- Suborder: Polyphaga
- Infraorder: Cucujiformia
- Family: Coccinellidae
- Genus: Chilocorus
- Species: C. geminus

Binomial name
- Chilocorus geminus Zaslavskij, 1962

= Chilocorus geminus =

Species of beetle

Chilocorus geminus is a species of beetle of the family Coccinellidae. It is found in China (Gansu, Xinjiang), Mongolia, Uzbekistan and Turkey.
