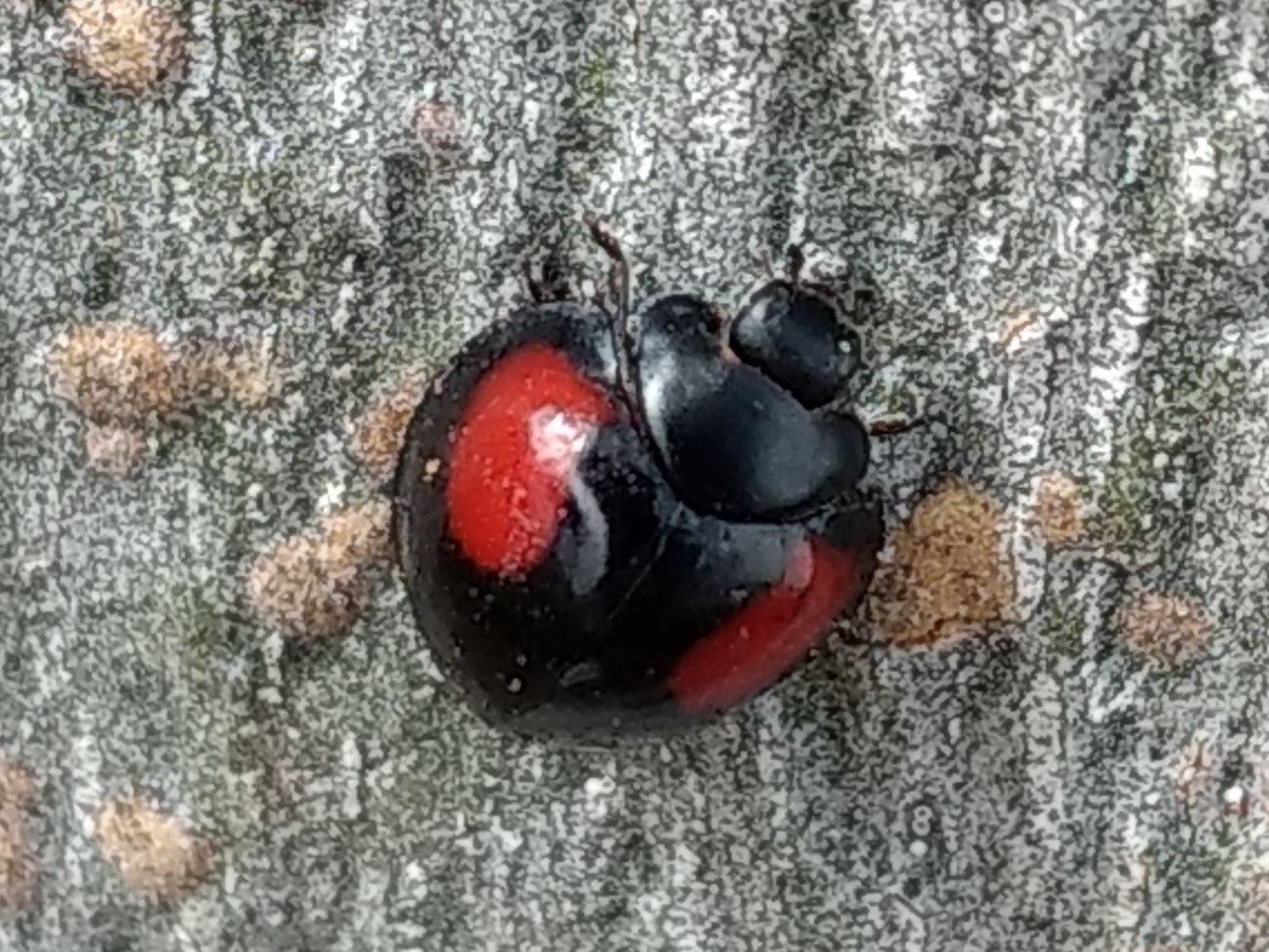

Scientific classification
- Kingdom: Animalia
- Phylum: Arthropoda
- Clade: Pancrustacea
- Class: Insecta
- Order: Coleoptera
- Suborder: Polyphaga
- Infraorder: Cucujiformia
- Family: Coccinellidae
- Genus: Axion
- Species: A. plagiatum

Binomial name
- Axion plagiatum (Olivier, 1808)

Synonyms
- Coccinella plagiata Olivier, 1808; Exochomus pilatii Mulsant, 1850; Exochomus texanus LeConte, 1858; Chilocorus pleuralis LeConte, 1859; Axion alutaceum Casey, 1899

= Axion plagiatum =

Species of beetle

Axion plagiatum is a species of lady beetle in the family Coccinellidae. It is found in the Caribbean and North America, where it has been recorded from Louisiana to Oregon and southern California.

== Description ==
Adults are similar Axion tripustulatum, but there is no sutural spot on the elytron.
