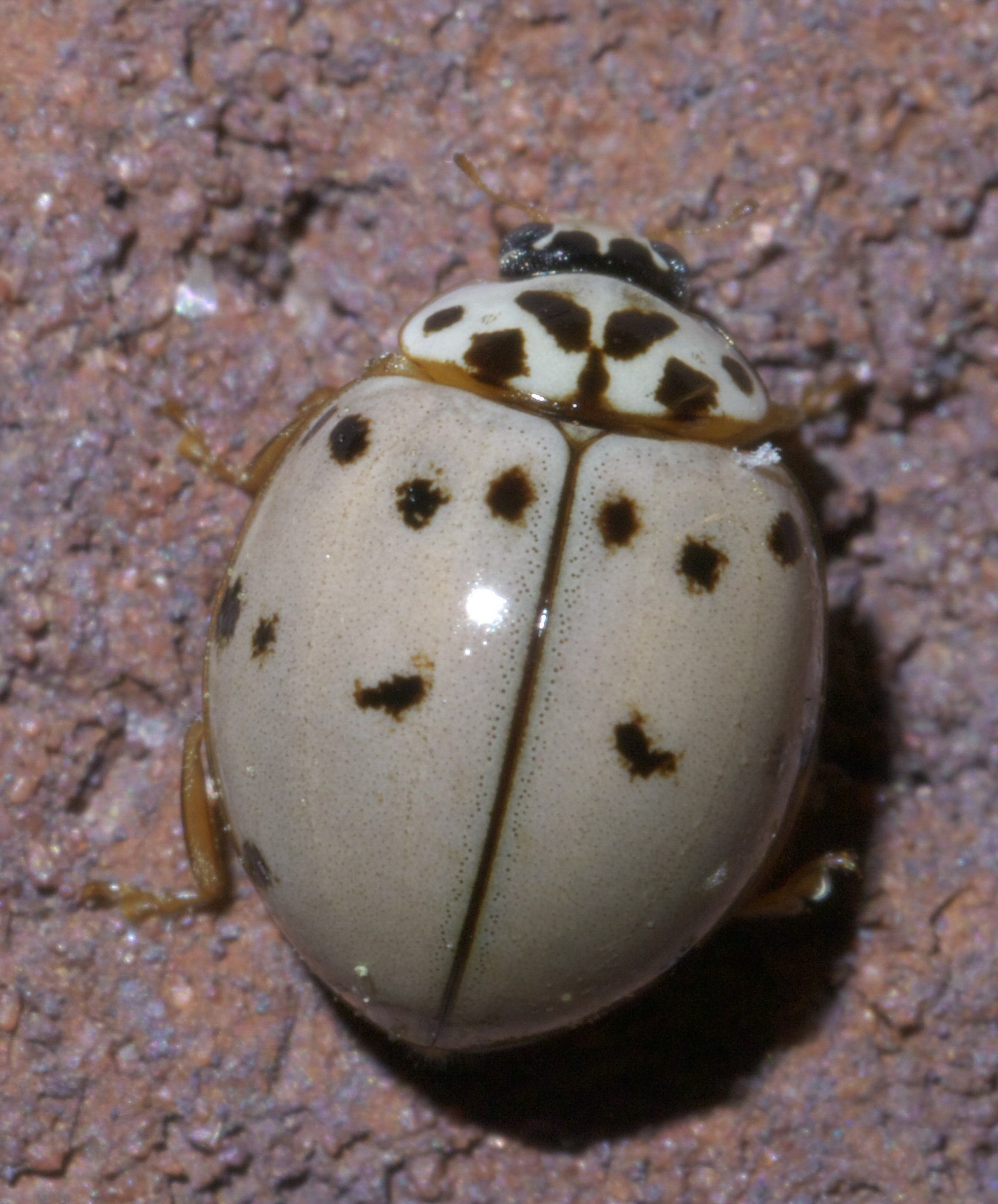
- Female

Scientific classification
- Kingdom: Animalia
- Phylum: Arthropoda
- Clade: Pancrustacea
- Class: Insecta
- Order: Coleoptera
- Suborder: Polyphaga
- Infraorder: Cucujiformia
- Family: Coccinellidae
- Subfamily: Coccinellinae
- Tribe: Coccinellini
- Genus: Olla
- Species: O. v-nigrum

Binomial name
- Olla v-nigrum (Mulsant, 1866)

Synonyms
- Harmonia v-nigrum Mulsant, 1866; Coccinella abdominalis Say, 1824 (preocc.); Cycloneda sayi Crotch, 1871; Olla plagiata Casey, 1899; Olla sobrina Casey, 1899; Olla fenestralis Casey, 1899; Olla minuta Casey, 1908; Procula orientalis De Zayas, 1988

= Olla v-nigrum =

Species of beetle

Olla v-nigrum is a species in the family Coccinellidae ("lady beetles"), in the suborder Polyphaga. The species is known generally as the ashy gray lady beetle. The distribution range of Olla v-nigrum includes Central America, North America, and Oceania. It is usually gray or pale tan with small black spots on its elytra and thorax. However, a variation can resemble Chilocorus orbus, another species of lady beetle. This form is black with two red spots on the wing covers and has white on the edge of the prothorax.

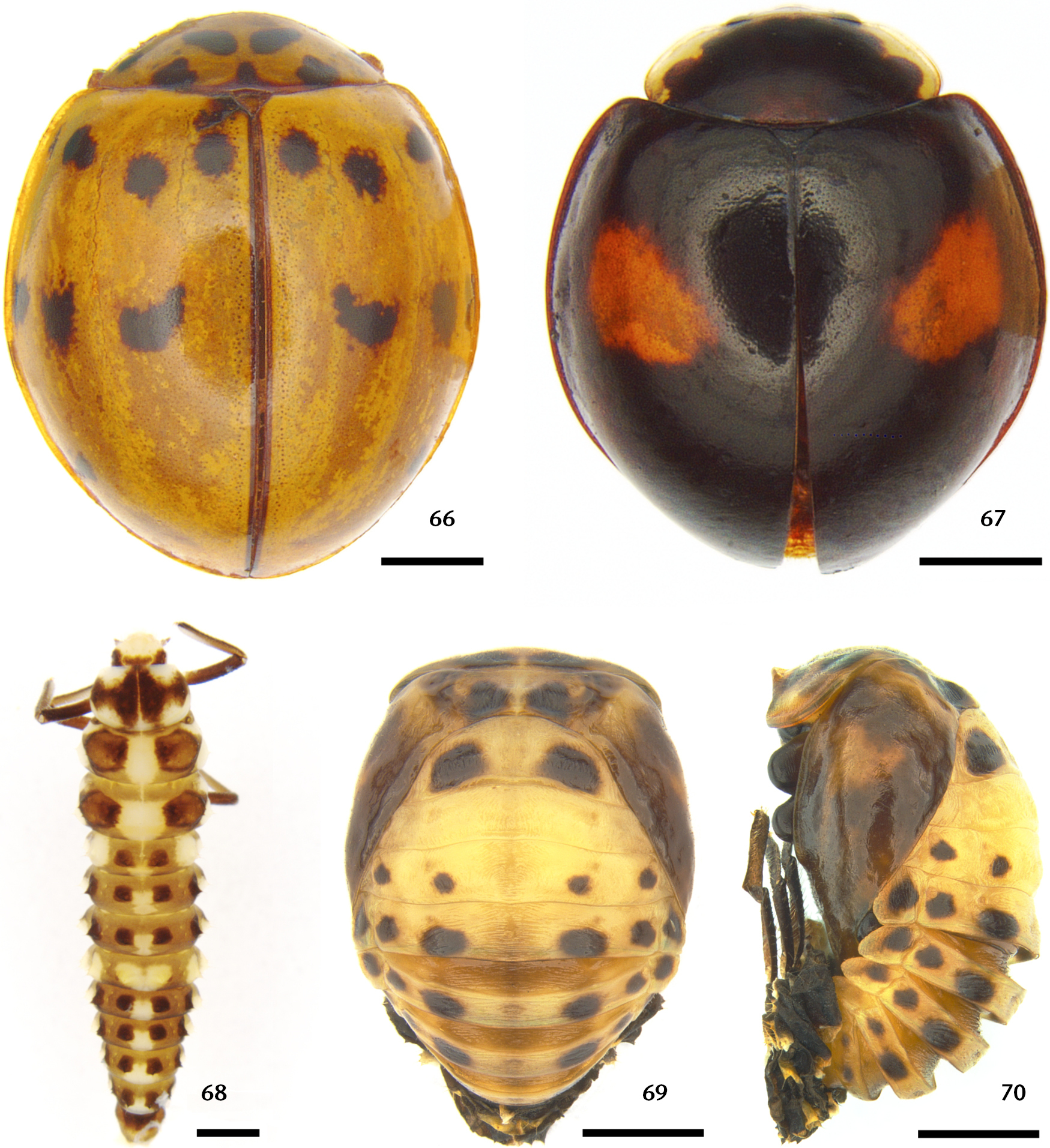
Both forms of adult Olla v-nigrum, larva, and pupae

The V in its name (v-nigrum) comes from the fact that Mulsant originally described the "prothorax" (pronotum) as "adorned with a V and four black dots".

== Appearance ==
Olla v-nigrum has two color variants: gray with black spots or black with red spots. They are usually anywhere between 3.7 to 6.1 mm (0.15 to 0.24 in) in length. Olla v-nigrum is often confused with Chilocorus sp. which usually have more flared elytra and a distinct shape. They do not have white marking on their heads like Olla v-nigrum. Olla v-nigrum spots tend to be triangular and slope away from where the wings meet.

Olla v-nigrum lack an infundibulum in female genitalia.

== Geographic range ==
Olla v-nigrum are indigenous to Florida but can be found throughout the continental United States and as far south as Argentina. Olla v-nigrum are found in Hawaii and Guam where they were once introduced due to biological control efforts. Other efforts have led to their introduction in Asia, including establishment in New Caledonia and Reunion Island. Also, the release of Olla v-nigrum has been documented in southeastern France, Israel, and Czechoslovakia, although the status of the beetle in these countries is now unknown due to their population numbers not being documented since their release.

Due to competition with the exotic Asian lady beetle (Harmonia axyridis), Olla v-nigrum has become less prominent throughout North America as both beetle species compete for the same broad range of prey, and the Asian lady beetle seems to be less susceptible to parasites. With the Asian lady beetle spreading to South America to countries such as Argentina and Brazil, Olla v-nigrum populations are expected to be negatively impacted.

Recent studies have shown that Olla v-nigrum have also begun to appear on the Canary Islands. It was first observed in 2014 on the islands Tenerife and La Palma, followed by Lanzarote and Gran Canaria. Finally, in 2020, Olla v-nigrum was recorded in Madeira.

== Life cycle ==
Olla v-nigrum has an egg stage of about one to two days on average. Compared to other beetles, Olla v-nigrum have a short larval duration of about seven days. The beetle's pupal phase lasts about four to five days. Finally, Olla v-nigrum has an egg-adult phase that lasts around 16 days. Overall, the total cycle period of Olla v-nigrum from larva to adult is about 25 days. From these eggs, more than 80% will usually be viable past the larval stage. Once Olla v-nigrum become adults, they usually show a longevity of around 60 days. The mean interval between generations of these beetles was found to be about 52 days on average.

O. v-nigrum larvae possess an elongated body. Their abdomen is segmented. After hatching, this species does not move around much. They remain around the eggs, even consuming infertile eggs.

== Food resources ==
Olla v-nigrum are known to oftentimes prey on psyllids, a family of insects. Olla v-nigrum populations have been observed to increase in response to increases in numbers of psyllids. Olla v-nigrum usually prey on immature psyllids, such as psyllid larvae. Olla v-nigrum has been observed in nature to specifically prey upon the Asian citrus psyllid (Diaphorina citri) as well as various aphids such as the Schizaphis graminum, Hyadaphis sp., Metopolophium dirhodum, Uroleucon sp., Breviocryne brassicaee L. and Myzus sp.

It has been tested whether Olla v-nigrum prey on the Southern green stink bug (Nezara viridula) eggs and nymphs. It has been shown that Olla v-nigrum tend to not prey upon living stink bugs very often. However, they will tend to prey more on dead nymphs of the stink bug. This has been hypothesized to be due to the fact that the Southern green stink bug may have a defensive secretion when it is alive that discourages the beetle from attacking the bug. Even then, only the 4th instars of Olla v-nigrum have been shown to attack the stink bug at a high rate, as the adults tended not to attack the stink bug at all.

This species also feeds on eggs and larvae from the Coleoptera and Lepidoptera orders. They even consume aphids from plants. Research has indicated that feeding this species with Anagasta kuehniella Zeller along with an artificial diet impacts Olla v-nigrum adults. The artificial diet used consisted of yeast, honey, ascorbic acid, and water. Results showed that this diet allowed females to produce an average of 11.7 eggs per egg mass with a viability of about 54.8%. The length of the instars was around the same. Further research must be conducted in order to adjust the diet to optimize rearing of this species.

== Migration ==
=== Seasonal locations ===
Olla v-nigrum are frequently found in both the tree canopy and at ground level. They are often found in abundance during periods of peak aphid abundance, as this is one of their main sources of food. Experimentally, they have been found at their highest population levels at the beginning of spring and towards the end of the summer at ground level. In terms of the canopy, they are usually found at their peak towards the end of the summer, but never in as great numbers as they are found at ground level. They are very helpful in aphid control due to this tendency to be abundant predators when there is a large number of aphids present.

== Parasitism ==
Olla v-nigrum have been used to attempt to control parasitism in New Caledonia. Here, the Neotropical psyllid, Heteropsylla cubana are major pests of Leucaena leuconcephala, and it was believed that Olla v-nigrum would help reduce the population of the psyllid in these areas. However, in these attempts, Olla v-nigrum fell victim to parasitism of its own from the phorid Phalacrotophora quadrimaculata that was found to infest the beetle.

The eggs of the Phalacrotophora quadrimaculata have been observed to be laid on the pupa of Olla v-nigrum and are usually placed in groups of up to eight on their victims. Eggs are usually stuck on the host's cuticle either laterally or ventrally. Following the hatching of the eggs, the larva will penetrate and enter the host immediately. After two to three days, these parasites will emerge through a visible hole on the ventral side of the host.

=== Use in control of pecan aphids ===
Olla v-nigrum have also been used in conjunction with pesticides for the control of pecan aphids on Carya illinoensis. This includes species such as the black pecan aphid (Melanocallis caryaefoliae), yellow pecan aphid (Monelliopsis pecanis), and the blackmargined aphid (Monellia caryella). Olla v-nigrum are important for the integrated control of pecan aphids because they have been shown to exhibit a lower mortality rate to certain pesticides compared to other beetles that have been used. However, Olla v-nigrum have been shown to exhibit a high mortality rate to carbaryl, which is a common pesticide used for pest control late in the pecan season which may limit their usefulness for integrated control of pecan aphids.

== Enemies ==
=== Fungi ===
Olla v-nigrum can become infected by a type of fungus known as Hesperoyces virescens. When infected with these fungi, it has been shown to increase mortality rates significantly in Olla v-nigrum. Olla v-nigrum have also been shown to be infected to have an increased mortality rate when they are co-infected by the fungi, Hesperomyces virescens and either Beauveria bassiana or Metarhizium brunneum. This was found to significantly increase their mortality rate as well.

Additional investigations revealed that although Hesperomyces virescens is known to infect other beetle species apart from Olla v-nigrum, interspecific transmission is uncommon between different species such as the convergent lady beetle (Hippodamia convergens) or the spotted lady beetle (Coleomegilla maculata). When interspecific transmission was present experimentally, it was only after substantial periods of close contact between the different species. This indicates that there is a very low likelihood that this would occur in the wild due to the species not having as much contact between one another in nature.

In addition to these fungi, Olla v-nigrum is known to commonly be infested by Beauveria bassiana. Although spread among much of the same regions as Harmonia acyridids, Olla v-nigrum show a much higher mortality rate when infected by Beauveria bassiana, a different type of fungus. Studies show that Olla v-nigrum tend to die from anywhere between 5 and 7 days after infection.

Olla v-nigrum have been experimentally tested for their susceptibility to infection by entomopathogenic nematodes. Similarly to the fungi, Olla v-nigrum were more susceptible to infection from the nematodes than the exotic Asian lady beetle (Harmonia acyridis). Although beetles aren't the first choice of host for nematodes in the wild, in an experimental setting, they have been demonstrated to have a mortality rate greater than 80% in Olla v-nigrum two days after infection.

== Cannibalism ==
Olla v-nigrum has been found to exhibit signs of cannibalism, even when there are sufficient resources available to the beetle. These rates of cannibalism are known to increase in response to a reduction of food availability. Reducing food quality, however, does not affect the rate of cannibalism in the beetle. Olla v-nigrum have not been shown to exhibit lower rates of cannibalism when comparing cannabilism in siblings vs. non-siblings, demonstrating that they have not developed sibling recognition mechanisms, otherwise they would more often cannibalize non-siblings. Finally, the size of the group of Olla v-nigrum larva has also been shown to not affect the number of cannibalism events among the beetles.

When provided with Harmonia axyridis larvae as part of their diet in the first or third instar stage of development, it has been shown that Olla v-nigrum larvae were incapable of surviving to the adult stage. In the first instar, Olla v-nigrum larvae were shown to have a 100% mortality rate when fed exotic H. axyridis eggs. When Olla v-nigrum began eating exotic H. axyridis eggs in the third instar, they still suffer from a 95% mortality rate experimentally. However, when fed other native species, there has been no evidence to suggest a significant increase in mortality rate in Olla v-nigrum.
