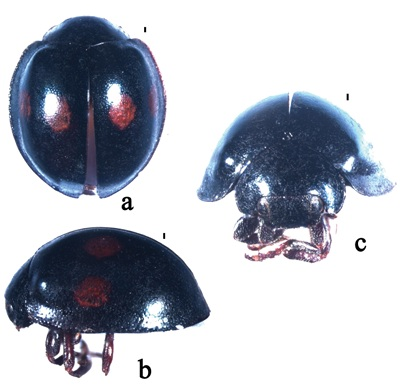

Scientific classification
- Kingdom: Animalia
- Phylum: Arthropoda
- Clade: Pancrustacea
- Class: Insecta
- Order: Coleoptera
- Suborder: Polyphaga
- Infraorder: Cucujiformia
- Family: Coccinellidae
- Genus: Chilocorus
- Species: C. alishanus

Binomial name
- Chilocorus alishanus Sasaji, 1968

= Chilocorus alishanus =

Species of beetle

Chilocorus alishanus is a species of beetle of the family Coccinellidae. It is found in China (Yunnan) and Taiwan.

== Description ==
Adults reach a length of about 3.4–3.7 mm (0.13–0.15 in). The head is deep black and the antennae are dark yellowish brown. The pronotum and elytra are black with a bluish or greenish lustre. Each elytron has a two reddish markings.
