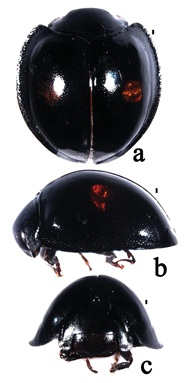

Scientific classification
- Kingdom: Animalia
- Phylum: Arthropoda
- Clade: Pancrustacea
- Class: Insecta
- Order: Coleoptera
- Suborder: Polyphaga
- Infraorder: Cucujiformia
- Family: Coccinellidae
- Genus: Chilocorus
- Species: C. esakii

Binomial name
- Chilocorus esakii Kamiya, 1959

= Chilocorus esakii =

Species of beetle

Chilocorus esakii is a species of beetle of the family Coccinellidae. It is found in China (Inner Mongolia, Hebei, Henan, Shaanxi, Shanghai, Liaoning, Shandong, Anhui, Jiangxi, Zhejiang, Hunan, Fujian, Guangdong, Sichuan, Guizhou, Guangxi) and Japan (Kyushu).
