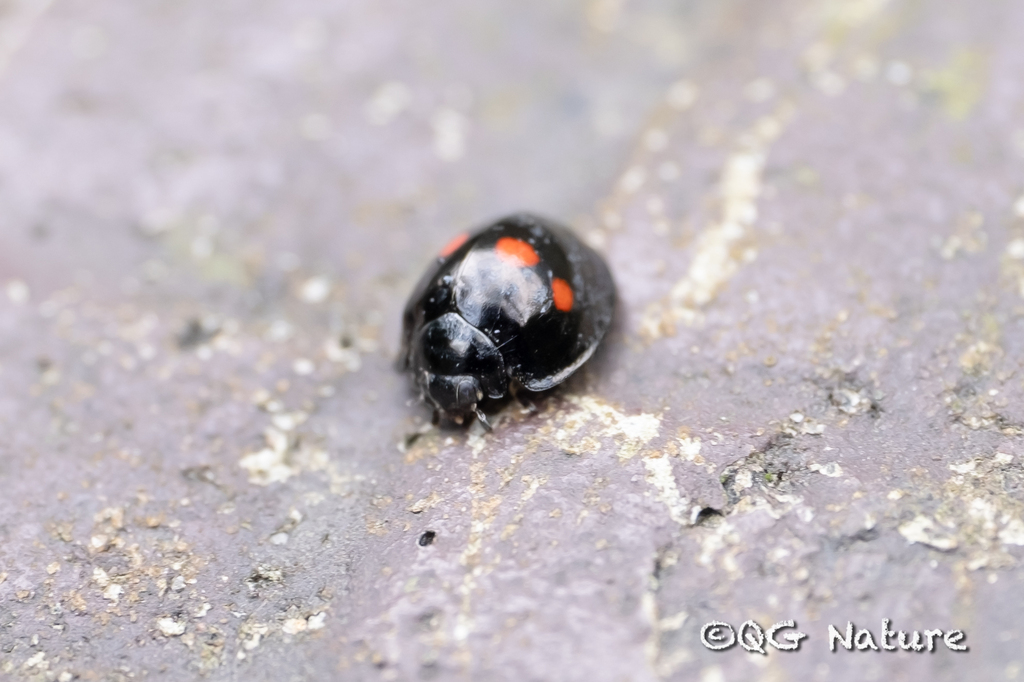

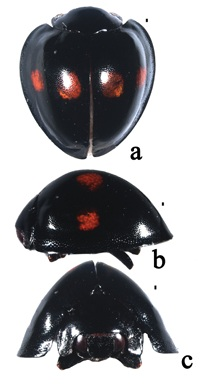

Scientific classification
- Kingdom: Animalia
- Phylum: Arthropoda
- Clade: Pancrustacea
- Class: Insecta
- Order: Coleoptera
- Suborder: Polyphaga
- Infraorder: Cucujiformia
- Family: Coccinellidae
- Genus: Chilocorus
- Species: C. infernalis

Binomial name
- Chilocorus infernalis Mulsant, 1853

Synonyms
- Chilocorus bijugus Mulsant, 1853

= Chilocorus infernalis =

Species of beetle

Chilocorus infernalis is a species of beetle of the family Coccinellidae. It is found in China (Jiangsu, Hubei, Sichuan, Guizhou, Yunnan, Tibet, Gansu), India (Arunachal Pradesh, Himachal Pradesh, Jammu & Kashmir, Meghalaya, Uttarakhand, Uttar Pradesh), Pakistan, Bhutan and Nepal. It is an introduced species in parts of Russia.

== Description ==
Adults reach a length of about 4.3–6 mm (0.17–0.24 in). They are shiny black, sometimes with a greenish tinge. Each elytron has two reddish testaceous or orange yellow spots.

== Life history ==
They have been recorded preying on Aleyrodidae, Aphidoidea and Coccoidea species.

== Taxonomy ==
The name Chilocorus bijugus is often used as the valid name for this species. Mulsant described both bijugus and infernalis in the same work, but Crotch gave precedence to infernalis over bijugus when he reviewed the species.
