= Chilocorus affinis =

Scientific classification
- Kingdom: Animalia
- Phylum: Arthropoda
- Clade: Pancrustacea
- Class: Insecta
- Order: Coleoptera
- Suborder: Polyphaga
- Infraorder: Cucujiformia
- Family: Coccinellidae
- Genus: Chilocorus
- Species: C. affinis

Binomial name
- Chilocorus affinis (Crotch, 1874)

Synonyms
- Anisorcus affinis Crotch, 1874

Species of beetle

Chilocorus affinis is a species of beetle of the family Coccinellidae. It is found in Fiji.

== Description ==
Adults reach a length of about 3.3–3.4 mm (0.13–0.13 in). The head is yellow with pale brown antennae, and the pronotum is yellowish with a dark orange to blackish disc. The scutellum is dark orange and the elytra are dark brown with yellow margins.
