= Chilocorus coelosimilis =

Scientific classification
- Kingdom: Animalia
- Phylum: Arthropoda
- Clade: Pancrustacea
- Class: Insecta
- Order: Coleoptera
- Suborder: Polyphaga
- Infraorder: Cucujiformia
- Family: Coccinellidae
- Genus: Chilocorus
- Species: C. coelosimilis

Binomial name
- Chilocorus coelosimilis Kapur, 1967

Species of beetle

Chilocorus coelosimilis is a species of beetle of the family Coccinellidae. It is found in India (Andaman Islands).

== Description ==
Adults reach a length of about 4.2–5.2 mm (0.17–0.20 in). They are orange yellow to ochreous, with a black spot at the apical corners of the elytra. The ventral surface is yellowish testaceous.

== Life history ==
They have been recorded preying on Aspidiotus destructor.
