= Chilocorus subindicus =

Scientific classification
- Kingdom: Animalia
- Phylum: Arthropoda
- Clade: Pancrustacea
- Class: Insecta
- Order: Coleoptera
- Suborder: Polyphaga
- Infraorder: Cucujiformia
- Family: Coccinellidae
- Genus: Chilocorus
- Species: C. subindicus

Binomial name
- Chilocorus subindicus Booth, 1998

Species of beetle

Chilocorus subindicus, is a species of lady beetle found in India, Sri Lanka and Maldives.

== Description ==
Very similar to Chilocorus nigritus in morphology. Body length is about 2.7 to 3.8 mm.

== Biology ==
The beetle is known to feed on aphids and scales such as Aspidiotus destructor, Parasaissetia nigra, and Saissetia, as well as two whitefly species, Aleurocanthus arecae, and Aleurodicus dispersus.
