= Chilocorus fryi =

Scientific classification
- Kingdom: Animalia
- Phylum: Arthropoda
- Clade: Pancrustacea
- Class: Insecta
- Order: Coleoptera
- Suborder: Polyphaga
- Infraorder: Cucujiformia
- Family: Coccinellidae
- Genus: Chilocorus
- Species: C. fryi

Binomial name
- Chilocorus fryi (Crotch, 1874)

Synonyms
- Anisorcus fryi Crotch, 1874

Species of beetle

Chilocorus fryi is a species of beetle of the family Coccinellidae. It is found in Fiji.

== Description ==
Adults reach a length of about 3.35–3.45 mm (0.132–0.136 in). The head and pronotum are dark reddish, while the antennae are pale brown. The scutellum is black and the elytra are black with a bluish metallic reflection.
