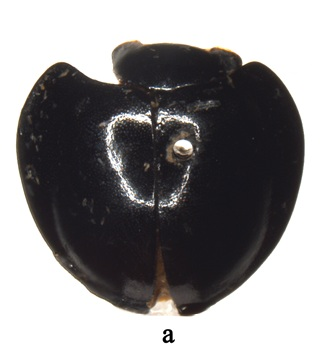

Scientific classification
- Kingdom: Animalia
- Phylum: Arthropoda
- Clade: Pancrustacea
- Class: Insecta
- Order: Coleoptera
- Suborder: Polyphaga
- Infraorder: Cucujiformia
- Family: Coccinellidae
- Genus: Chilocorus
- Species: C. yunlongensis

Binomial name
- Chilocorus yunlongensis Cao & Xiao, 1984

= Chilocorus yunlongensis =

Species of beetle

Chilocorus yunlongensis is a species of beetle of the family Coccinellidae. It is found in India (Meghalaya) and China (Yunnan).

== Description ==
The dorsal surface is black, except for the slightly paler anterolateral borders of the pronotum. The ventral surface is black, with the antennae and legs yellowish testaceous and the abdomen mostly yellowish testaceous.
