= Chilocorus malayanus =

Scientific classification
- Kingdom: Animalia
- Phylum: Arthropoda
- Clade: Pancrustacea
- Class: Insecta
- Order: Coleoptera
- Suborder: Polyphaga
- Infraorder: Cucujiformia
- Family: Coccinellidae
- Genus: Chilocorus
- Species: C. malayanus

Binomial name
- Chilocorus malayanus (Crotch, 1874)

Synonyms
- Anisorcus malayanus Crotch, 1874

Species of beetle

Chilocorus malayanus is a species of beetle of the family Coccinellidae. It is found in Fiji, the Solomon Islands and Vanuatu.

== Description ==
Adults reach a length of about 3.85–4.05 mm (0.152–0.159 in). The head is yellowish with pale brown antennae. The pronotum and scutellum are orange and the elytra are blackish with yellowish margins.
