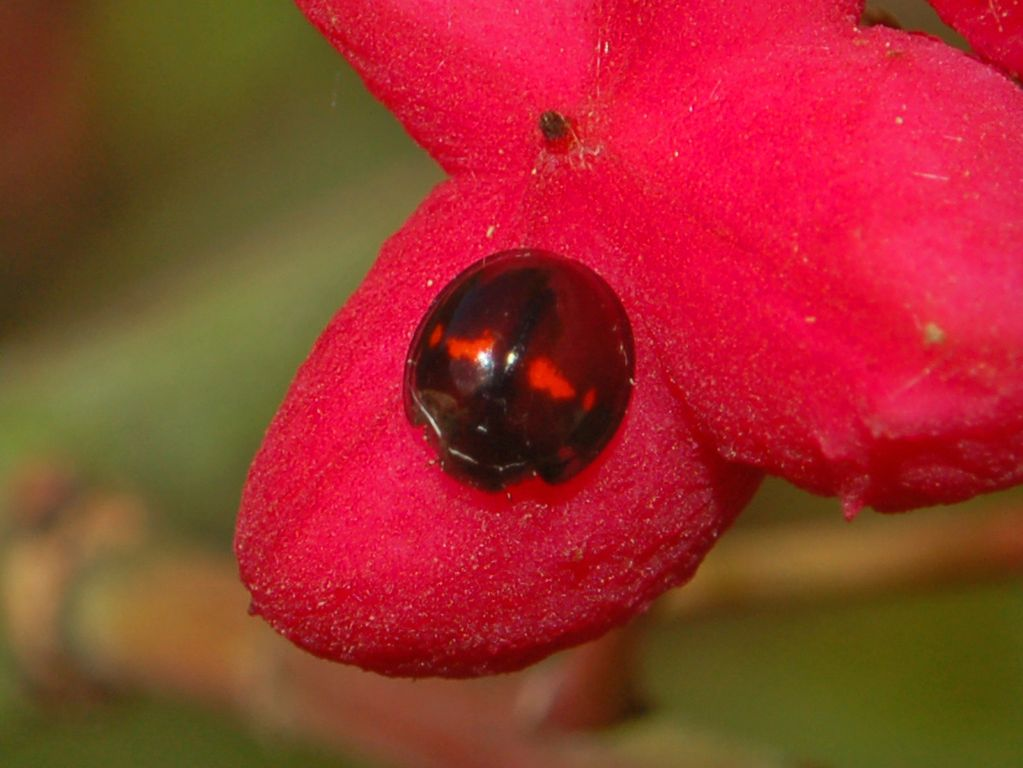
- Chilocorus bipustulatus

Scientific classification
- Kingdom: Animalia
- Phylum: Arthropoda
- Clade: Pancrustacea
- Class: Insecta
- Order: Coleoptera
- Suborder: Polyphaga
- Infraorder: Cucujiformia
- Family: Coccinellidae
- Tribe: Chilocorini
- Genus: Chilocorus; Leach, 1815

Synonyms
- Anisorcus Crotch, 1874; Egius Mulsant, 1850; Phaenochilus Weise, 1895; Simmondsius Ahmad & Ghani, 1966

= Chilocorus =

Genus of beetles

Chilocorus is a genus of beetles belonging to the family Coccinellidae.

== List of species ==
These species belong to the genus Chilocorus.

- Chilocorus adustus
- Chilocorus affinis
- Chilocorus albomarginalis
- Chilocorus alishanus
- Chilocorus amamensis
- Chilocorus angolensis
- Chilocorus bennigseni
- Chilocorus bipustulatus (Linnaeus, 1758) - Heather ladybird
- Chilocorus braeti Weise, 1895
- Chilocorus cacti (Linnaeus, 1767) - Cactus lady beetle
- Chilocorus calvus
- Chilocorus canariensis Crotch, 1874
- Chilocorus celebensis
- Chilocorus chalybeatus
- Chilocorus chinensis
- Chilocorus chujoi
- Chilocorus circumdatus (Gyllenhal in Schönherr, 1808) - Red chilocorus
- Chilocorus coelosimilis Kapur, 1967
- Chilocorus cooki
- Chilocorus crotchi
- Chilocorus cruentus
- Chilocorus distigma
- Chilocorus dohrnii
- Chilocorus elegans
- Chilocorus esakii
- Chilocorus flaviceps
- †Chilocorus foersteri
- Chilocorus fraternus LeConte, 1860
- Chilocorus fryi
- Chilocorus geminus
- Chilocorus gracilior
- Chilocorus haematocephalus
- Chilocorus hauseri Weise, 1895
- Chilocorus hexacyclus Smith, 1959
- Chilocorus hupehanus
- Chilocorus indicus
- Chilocorus infernalis Mulsant, 1853
- †Chilocorus inflatus
- Chilocorus inornatus
- Chilocorus insularis
- Chilocorus ishigakensis
- Chilocorus kashaya
- Chilocorus keralensis
- Chilocorus kirgisicus
- Chilocorus kuwanae Silvestri, 1909 - Kuwana's lady beetle
- Chilocorus maculatus
- Chilocorus malasiae
- Chilocorus malayanus
- Chilocorus marshalli
- Chilocorus matsumurai Miyatake, 1985
- Chilocorus melanophthalmus Mulsant, 1850
- Chilocorus melas Weise, 1898
- Chilocorus metallescens
- Chilocorus metasternalis
- Chilocorus micrus
- Chilocorus midas
- Chilocorus mikado
- Chilocorus mitsuhashii
- Chilocorus monostigma
- Chilocorus nigricaeruleus
- Chilocorus nigripes
- Chilocorus nigritus (Fabricius, 1798) - Black chilocorus
- Chilocorus opponens
- Chilocorus orbus Casey, 1899
- Chilocorus pakistanensis
- Chilocorus pilosus
- Chilocorus platycephalus
- Chilocorus politus Mulsant, 1850
- Chilocorus punctifrons
- Chilocorus quadriguttatus
- Chilocorus quadrimaculatus
- Chilocorus reinecki
- Chilocorus renipunctus
- Chilocorus renipustulatus (L.G. Scriba, 1791)
- Chilocorus rubidus Hope in Gray, 1831
- Chilocorus rubrocinctus
- Chilocorus rufitarsis
- Chilocorus rufithorax
- Chilocorus rufoplagiatus
- Chilocorus sanguinolentus
- Chilocorus schioedtii
- Chilocorus semiaeneus
- Chilocorus seminulum
- Chilocorus sexguttatus
- Chilocorus shirozui
- Chilocorus silvestrii
- Chilocorus similis (Rossi, 1790)
- Chilocorus simoni
- Chilocorus stigma (Say, 1835) - Twice-stabbed lady beetle
- Chilocorus stillatus
- Chilocorus strenotubus
- Chilocorus subaenescens
- Chilocorus subindicus Booth, 1998
- Chilocorus sublineatus
- Chilocorus takara
- Chilocorus tibialis
- Chilocorus toulakhomianus
- Chilocorus tricyclus Smith, 1959
- Chilocorus trimaculatus
- Chilocorus tumidus Leng, 1908
- †Chilocorus ulkei
- Chilocorus vientianicus
- Chilocorus wahlbergii
- Chilocorus yunlongensis
