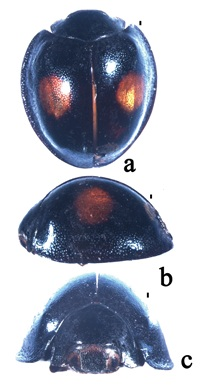

Scientific classification
- Kingdom: Animalia
- Phylum: Arthropoda
- Clade: Pancrustacea
- Class: Insecta
- Order: Coleoptera
- Suborder: Polyphaga
- Infraorder: Cucujiformia
- Family: Coccinellidae
- Genus: Chilocorus
- Species: C. shirozui

Binomial name
- Chilocorus shirozui Sasaji, 1968

= Chilocorus shirozui =

Species of beetle

Chilocorus shirozui is a species of beetle of the family Coccinellidae. It is found in Taiwan.

== Description ==
Adults reach a length of about 3.9–4.6 mm (0.15–0.18 in). The head is black and the antennae are dark brown. The pronotum and elytra are black with a bluish metallic lustre and the scutellum is black. Each elytron has a reddish spot.
