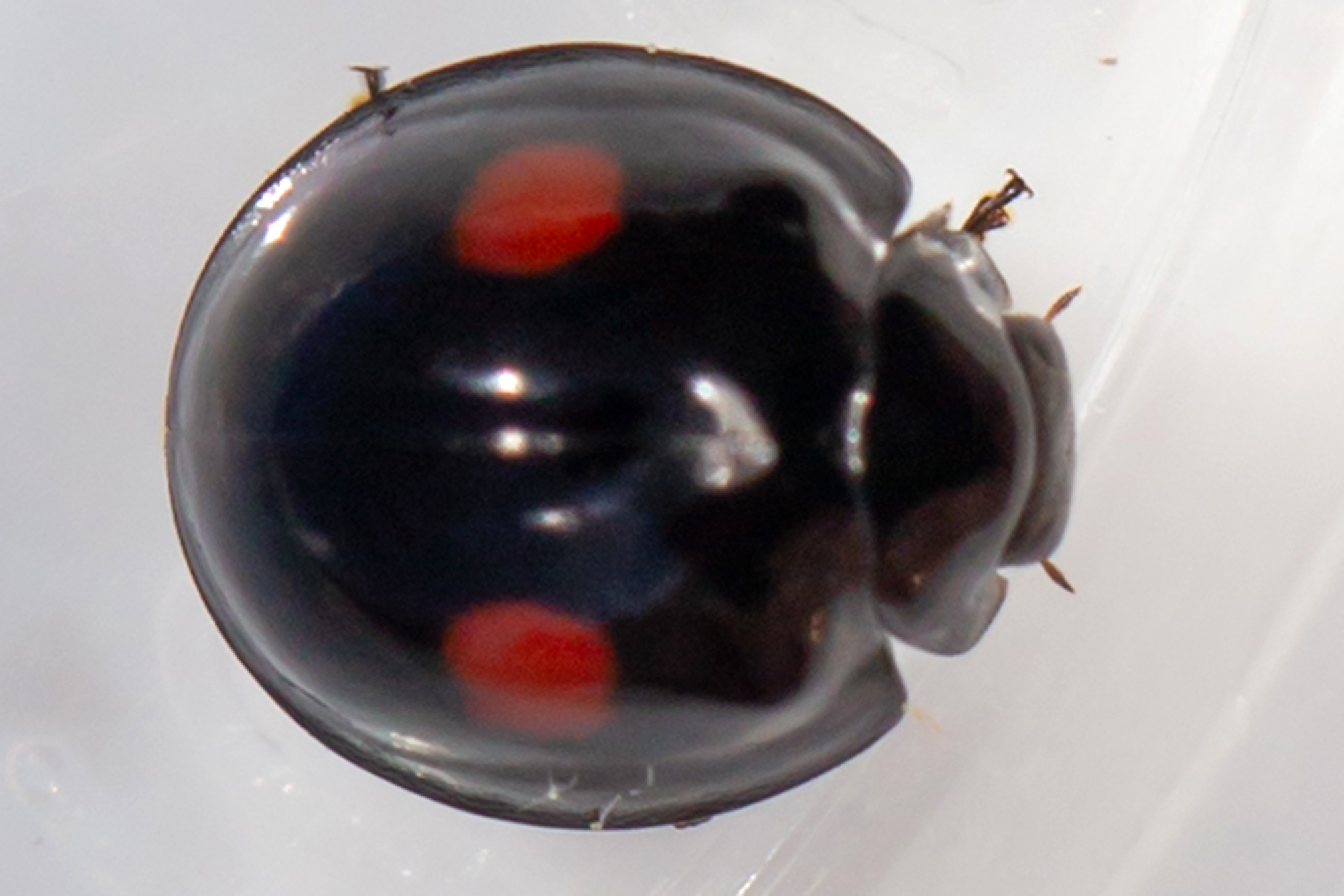

Scientific classification
- Kingdom: Animalia
- Phylum: Arthropoda
- Clade: Pancrustacea
- Class: Insecta
- Order: Coleoptera
- Suborder: Polyphaga
- Infraorder: Cucujiformia
- Family: Coccinellidae
- Genus: Chilocorus
- Species: C. tumidus

Binomial name
- Chilocorus tumidus Leng, 1908

= Chilocorus tumidus =

Species of beetle

Chilocorus tumidus is a species of lady beetles in the family Coccinellidae. It is native to North America, where it has been recorded from Virginia and Maryland.

== Description ==
Adults reach a length of about 4.20-5.75 mm. Adults are dark brown to black, with a transverse spot on the elytron.
