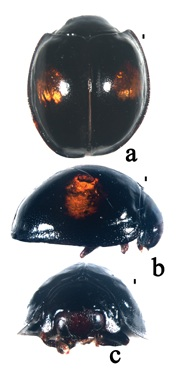

Scientific classification
- Kingdom: Animalia
- Phylum: Arthropoda
- Clade: Pancrustacea
- Class: Insecta
- Order: Coleoptera
- Suborder: Polyphaga
- Infraorder: Cucujiformia
- Family: Coccinellidae
- Genus: Chilocorus
- Species: C. strenotubus

Binomial name
- Chilocorus strenotubus Li & Wang in Li et al., 2018

= Chilocorus strenotubus =

Species of beetle

Chilocorus strenotubus is a species of beetle of the family Coccinellidae. It is found in China (Inner Mongolia).

== Description ==
Adults reach a length of about 3.41 mm (0.134 in). The body is roundish and strongly convex. The head, antennae and mouthparts are brown-black and sparsely covered with short, greyish pubescence. The pronotum and scutellum are black and the elytra are black with a pair of oblong, orange spots, situated at the centre. The underside is black except for the brown abdomen. The underside is sparsely covered with short, greyish pubescence.

== Etymology ==
The species name is derived from Latin and refers to the stout penis.
