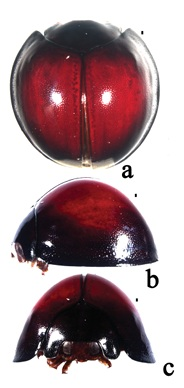

Scientific classification
- Kingdom: Animalia
- Phylum: Arthropoda
- Clade: Pancrustacea
- Class: Insecta
- Order: Coleoptera
- Suborder: Polyphaga
- Infraorder: Cucujiformia
- Family: Coccinellidae
- Genus: Chilocorus
- Species: C. chinensis

Binomial name
- Chilocorus chinensis Miyatake, 1970

= Chilocorus chinensis =

Species of beetle

Chilocorus chinensis is a species of beetle of the family Coccinellidae. It is found in China (Anhui, Zhejiang, Fujian, Jiangxi, Henan, Guangdong, Guangxi, Hainan, Guizhou, Yunnan, Jiangsu).
