= Selenaspidus articulatus =

Scientific classification
- Domain: Eukaryota
- Kingdom: Animalia
- Phylum: Arthropoda
- Class: Insecta
- Order: Hemiptera
- Suborder: Sternorrhyncha
- Family: Diaspididae
- Subtribe: Selenaspidina
- Genus: Selenaspidus
- Species: S. articulatus

Binomial name
- Selenaspidus articulatus (Morgan, 1889)

Species of scale insect

Selenaspidus articulatus is an armoured scale insect in the family Diaspididae, commonly known as the West Indian red scale. It is a polyphagous species found in tropical and subtropical regions around the world as a pest species of Citrus and other fruit and ornamental trees.

== Description ==
The adult female scale is roughly circular with a diameter of about 2.3 mm (0.09 in). It is flat, semi-transparent and greyish-white, with the yellowish-brown exuviae being near the centre. The adult male scale is a long, white or pale brown oval, and is slightly smaller than the female scale, with the darker-coloured exuviae near one end.

== Distribution ==
Selenaspidus articulatus is native to the southern United States, the West Indies, Mexico, Central America, Venezuela, Colombia, Surinam, Guyana, Brazil, Ecuador, Bolivia and Peru. It also occurs in the Philippines, Sri Lanka and Taiwan, and in most of sub-Saharan Africa.

== Host plants ==
Selenaspidus articulatus is polyphagous and has been recorded on 101 genera in 52 families. These include avocado, banana, caimito, Citrus, cocoa, coconut, garden croton, coffee, Cycas, Ficus, forest trees, mahogany, Gardenia, Cape jasmine, jasmine, mango, olive, palm, Pandanus, paw-paw, rose, and rubber.

== Ecology ==
Selenaspidus articulatus feeds on the stems, foliage, flowers and fruits of its hosts. The insects are herbivorous, and adults and nymphs feed on phloem sap sucked from the plant's vascular system. This can introduce toxins into the plant, and weakens it, causing leaves to fall in heavy infestations. Lady beetles are important predators of this scale insect, as well as parasitic wasps in the Aphelinidae and Encyrtidae families, and Signiphora lutea.
