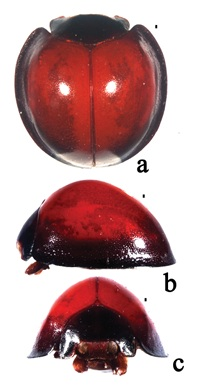

Scientific classification
- Kingdom: Animalia
- Phylum: Arthropoda
- Clade: Pancrustacea
- Class: Insecta
- Order: Coleoptera
- Suborder: Polyphaga
- Infraorder: Cucujiformia
- Family: Coccinellidae
- Genus: Chilocorus
- Species: C. rufitarsis

Binomial name
- Chilocorus rufitarsis Motschulsky, 1854

Synonyms
- Chilocorus monachus Mulsant, 1856

= Chilocorus rufitarsis =

Species of beetle

Chilocorus rufitarsis is a species of beetle of the family Coccinellidae. It is found in China (Jiangsu, Zhejiang, Fujian, Jiangxi, Hunan, Guangdong, Guangxi, Sichuan, Guizhou, Yunnan, Hongkong, Shandong) and Vietnam.
