= Chilocorus orbus =

Scientific classification
- Kingdom: Animalia
- Phylum: Arthropoda
- Clade: Pancrustacea
- Class: Insecta
- Order: Coleoptera
- Suborder: Polyphaga
- Infraorder: Cucujiformia
- Family: Coccinellidae
- Genus: Chilocorus
- Species: C. orbus

Binomial name
- Chilocorus orbus Casey, 1899

Species of beetle

Chilocorus orbus is a species of lady beetle in the family Coccinellidae. It is native to North America. It is a black, domed beetle with two large red spots and is commonly called the twice-stabbed lady beetle or the two-stabbed lady beetle. Both adults and larvae feed on scale insects.

== Description ==
The adult Chilocorus orbus is a dome-shaped beetle some 3 to 5 mm (0.12 to 0.20 in) long with club-shaped antennae. The shiny black elytra bear two oval red patches and the ventral surface of the beetle is reddish. There are other species of black-with-red-spots lady beetle with which this insect might be confused, these being Axion plagiatum, Chilocorus kuwanae, and Olla v-nigrum, however in Chilocorus orbus, the red patches are nearer the head than they are in the other species. The larvae resemble miniature alligators, have long legs and are grey or blackish; they have elongated bodies covered with branching spines. The pupae are also blackish and spiny, but are broader and shorter than the larvae.

== Distribution and habitat ==
Chilocorus orbus is one of about a dozen species of Chilocorus that occur in North America. It is predominantly found in the western states of Washington, Oregon and California, being replaced in other areas of the United States by other, closely related species. It is a mostly arboreal insect, found in forests, plantations, orchards and gardens, wherever there are scale insects on which to feed.

== Ecology ==
Both adults and larvae feed voraciously on scale insects on fruit trees, as well as on nut trees and ornamentals. The scales attacked include brown soft scale (Coccus hesperidum) on citrus, walnut scale (Quadraspidiotus juglansregiae), sycamore scale (Stomacoccus platani), California red scale (Aonidiella aurantii), San Jose scale (Quadraspidiotus perniciosus) and European fruit lecanium (Parthenolecanium corni). The young larvae puncture the scale insects and suck out their juices, venturing under the horny part of the scale to do so, while older larvae and adults chew the scales up and completely consume them.
