= Chilocorus keralensis =

Scientific classification
- Kingdom: Animalia
- Phylum: Arthropoda
- Clade: Pancrustacea
- Class: Insecta
- Order: Coleoptera
- Suborder: Polyphaga
- Infraorder: Cucujiformia
- Family: Coccinellidae
- Genus: Chilocorus
- Species: C. keralensis

Binomial name
- Chilocorus keralensis Poorani, 2023

Species of beetle

Chilocorus keralensis is a species of beetle of the family Coccinellidae. It is found in India (Kerala).

== Description ==
Adults reach a length of about 4.6–5 mm (0.18–0.20 in). The head is yellowish to reddish brown and the pronotum is black with reddish or yellowish brown anterolateral margins. The scutellum and elytra are shiny black.

== Etymology ==
The species name refers to Kerala, the state from where the specimens were collected.
