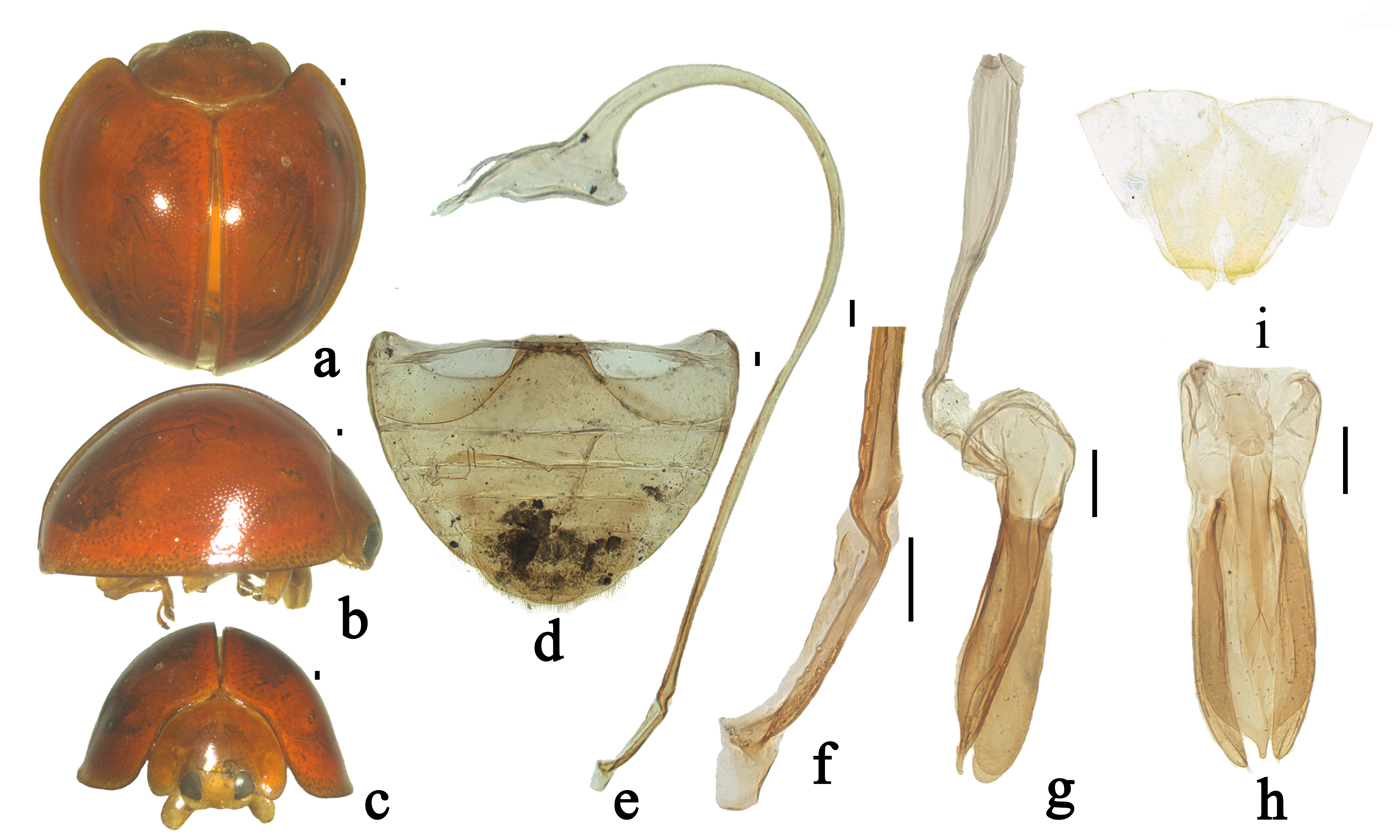

Scientific classification
- Kingdom: Animalia
- Phylum: Arthropoda
- Clade: Pancrustacea
- Class: Insecta
- Order: Coleoptera
- Suborder: Polyphaga
- Infraorder: Cucujiformia
- Family: Coccinellidae
- Genus: Chilocorus
- Species: C. vientianicus

Binomial name
- Chilocorus vientianicus Li & Wang, 2021

= Chilocorus vientianicus =

Species of beetle

Chilocorus vientianicus is a species of beetle of the family Coccinellidae. It is found in Laos.

== Description ==
Adults reach a length of about 4.91–5.66 mm (0.193–0.223 in). The body is roundish and strongly convex. The head, mouthparts and antennae are brownish-red and sparsely covered with short, greyish pubescence. The pronotum, scutellum and elytra are glabrous and brownish-red. The underside is brownish-yellow and sparsely covered with short, greyish pubescence.

== Etymology ==
The species name refers to Vientiane, the type locality.
