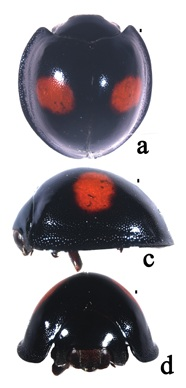

Scientific classification
- Kingdom: Animalia
- Phylum: Arthropoda
- Clade: Pancrustacea
- Class: Insecta
- Order: Coleoptera
- Suborder: Polyphaga
- Infraorder: Cucujiformia
- Family: Coccinellidae
- Genus: Chilocorus
- Species: C. chalybeatus

Binomial name
- Chilocorus chalybeatus Gorham, 1892

= Chilocorus chalybeatus =

Species of beetle

Chilocorus chalybeatus is a species of beetle of the family Coccinellidae. It is found in China (Anhui, Zhejiang, Fujian, Hunan, Guangdong, Hainan, Sichuan, Guizhou, Yunnan, Shaanxi, Gansu, Guangxi).
