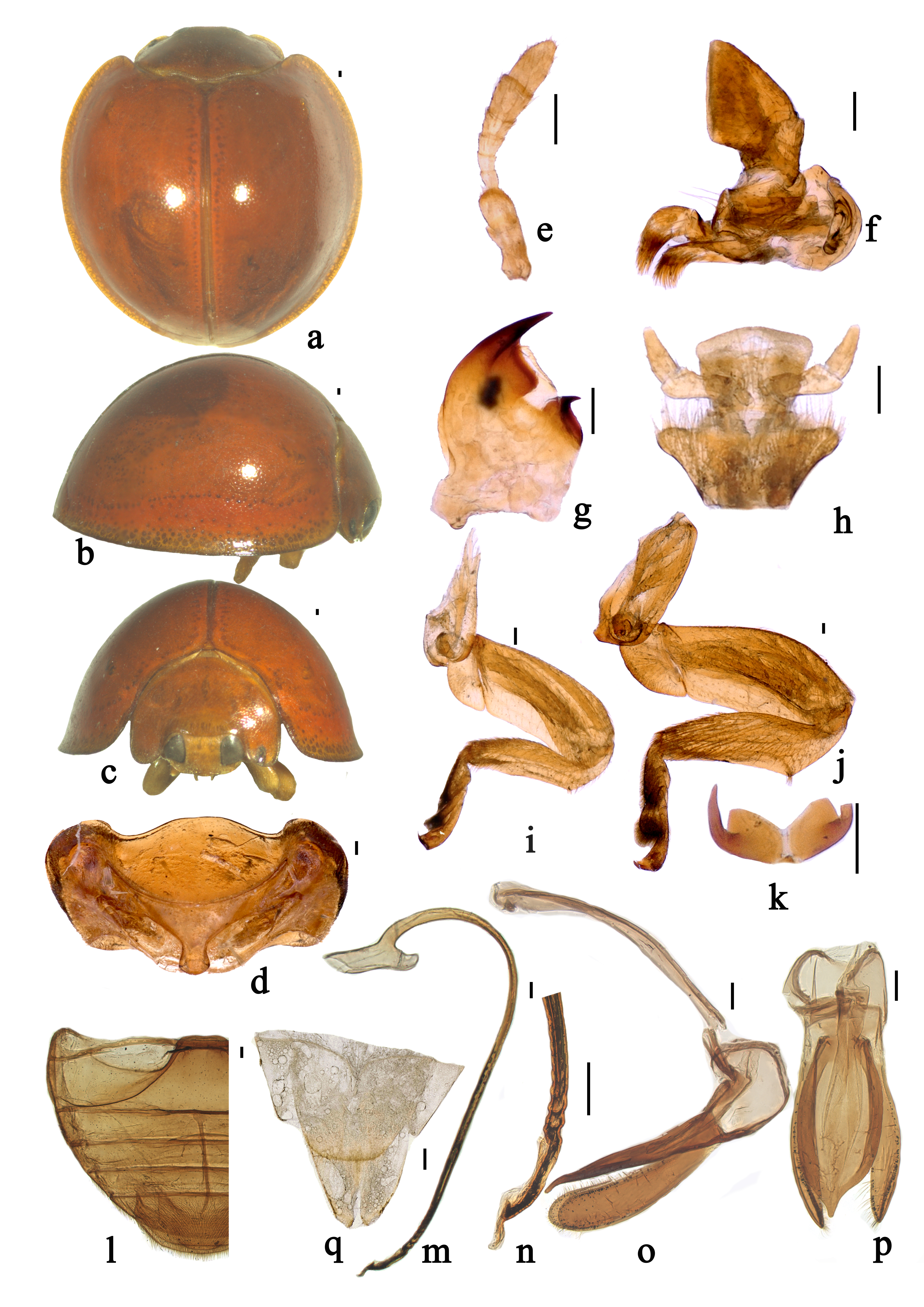

Scientific classification
- Kingdom: Animalia
- Phylum: Arthropoda
- Clade: Pancrustacea
- Class: Insecta
- Order: Coleoptera
- Suborder: Polyphaga
- Infraorder: Cucujiformia
- Family: Coccinellidae
- Genus: Chilocorus
- Species: C. toulakhomianus

Binomial name
- Chilocorus toulakhomianus Li & Wang, 2021

= Chilocorus toulakhomianus =

Species of beetle

Chilocorus toulakhomianus is a species of beetle of the family Coccinellidae. It is found in Laos.

== Description ==
Adults reach a length of about 4.8–6 mm (0.19–0.24 in). The body is roundish and strongly convex. The head, mouthparts and antennae are brownish-red and sparsely covered with short, greyish pubescence. The pronotum, scutellum and elytra are glabrous and brownish-red. The underside is brownish-yellow and sparsely covered with short, greyish pubescence.

== Etymology ==
The species is named after Toulakhom, the type specimen collector.
