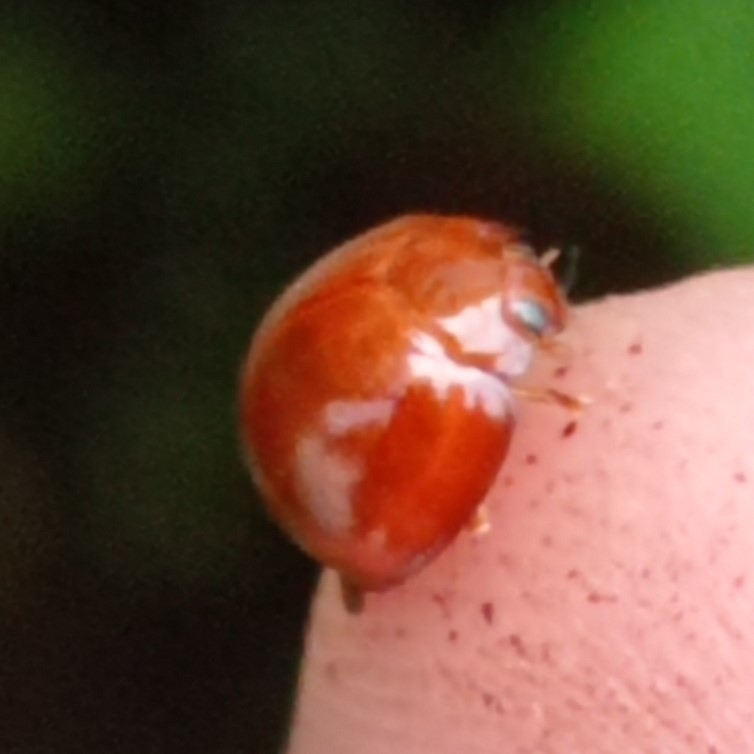

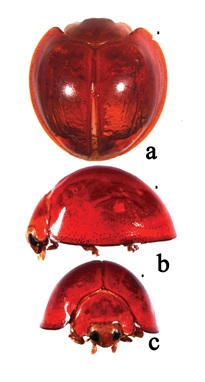

Scientific classification
- Kingdom: Animalia
- Phylum: Arthropoda
- Clade: Pancrustacea
- Class: Insecta
- Order: Coleoptera
- Suborder: Polyphaga
- Infraorder: Cucujiformia
- Family: Coccinellidae
- Genus: Chilocorus
- Species: C. politus

Binomial name
- Chilocorus politus Mulsant, 1850

= Chilocorus politus =

Species of beetle

Chilocorus politus is a species of beetle of the family Coccinellidae. It is found in China (Guangxi, Yunnan, Tibet), Taiwan, India (Meghalaya, Sikkim, West Bengal), Bhutan, Nepal, Thailand, Laos, Indonesia (Java) and Réunion. It was introduced in Mauritius.

== Description ==
Adults reach a length of about 4.5–6.5 mm (0.18–0.26 in). The dorsal and ventral surfaces are orange-yellow to ochreous to reddish-orange.

== Life history ==
They have been recorded preying on the citrus whitefly and aphids.
