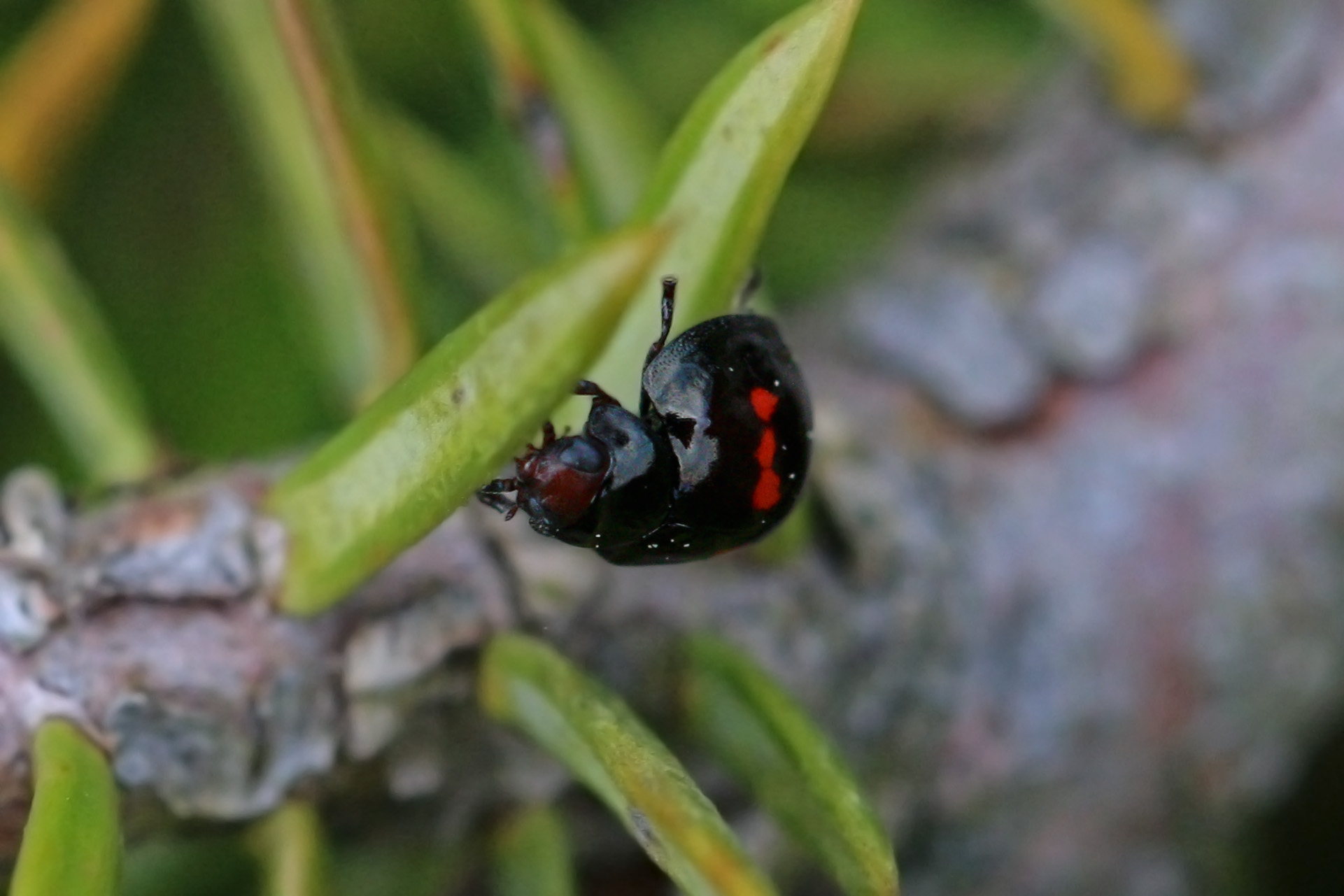

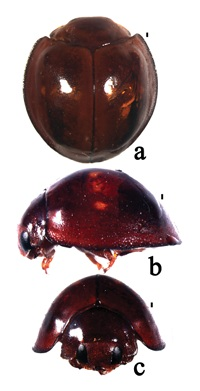

Scientific classification
- Kingdom: Animalia
- Phylum: Arthropoda
- Clade: Pancrustacea
- Class: Insecta
- Order: Coleoptera
- Suborder: Polyphaga
- Infraorder: Cucujiformia
- Family: Coccinellidae
- Genus: Chilocorus
- Species: C. bipustulatus

Binomial name
- Chilocorus bipustulatus (Linnaeus, 1758)

Synonyms
- Coccinella bipustulata Linnaeus, 1758; Coccinella testudo Florencourt Chassot, 1796; Chilocorus bipustulatus var. meridionalis Eichler, 1924; Chilocorus bipustulatus var. minor Sahlberg, 1903; Coccinella fasciata Müller, 1776; Coccinella transversepunctata Börner, 1776; Coccinella frontalis Thunberg, 1792; Coccinella strigata Fabricius, 1798; Coccinella olivetorum Costa, 1839

= Chilocorus bipustulatus =

Species of beetle

Chilocorus bipustulatus, the heather ladybird, is a beetle species belonging to the family Coccinellidae.

These beetles are found in most of the Palearctic realm, (Europe, North Africa, Asia north of the Himalayan foothills, and northern and central Arabian Peninsula), and has been introduced to tropical Africa, Hawaii, and North America.

The elytra of this small beetle are a shiny brown with two reddish-orange spots on each elytron (hence the Latin word bipustulatus, meaning two-blistered). Sometime three spots run in an horizontal line and join into two larger stains.

The mature larva is about 5 millimetres (0.20 in) long. Wintering occurs as an adult. The adults grow up to 3–5 millimetres (0.12–0.20 in) long and can be encountered from May through October.

In Europe it occurs in fruit gardens, pine forests, and stone quarries. In Poland it was found on grasses, low vegetation and bushes, on heath lands, under flakes of bark on pines and fruit trees, occasionally in leaf litter and in moss

Heather ladybirds feed on aphids and scale insects (mainly belonging to the family Coccidae and Diaspididae) and is often introduced as a biological control in cases of infestation.
