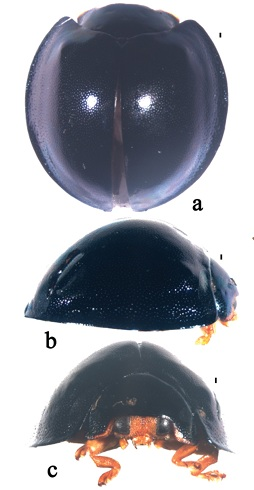

Scientific classification
- Kingdom: Animalia
- Phylum: Arthropoda
- Clade: Pancrustacea
- Class: Insecta
- Order: Coleoptera
- Suborder: Polyphaga
- Infraorder: Cucujiformia
- Family: Coccinellidae
- Genus: Chilocorus
- Species: C. nigricaeruleus

Binomial name
- Chilocorus nigricaeruleus Li & Wang in Li et al., 2018

= Chilocorus nigricaeruleus =

Species of beetle

Chilocorus nigricaeruleus is a species of beetle of the family Coccinellidae. It is found in India (Assam) and China (Yunnan).

== Description ==
Adults reach a length of about 4.4–4.67 mm (0.173–0.184 in). The head and antennae are yellow, while the pronotum is bluish black, with yellow anterior angles. The scutellum and elytra are dark bluish-violet with a metallic lustre.

== Etymology ==
The species name is derived from Latin and refers to the colour of the elytra and pronotum (black with a bluish lustre).
