= Chilocorus flaviceps =

Scientific classification
- Kingdom: Animalia
- Phylum: Arthropoda
- Clade: Pancrustacea
- Class: Insecta
- Order: Coleoptera
- Suborder: Polyphaga
- Infraorder: Cucujiformia
- Family: Coccinellidae
- Genus: Chilocorus
- Species: C. flaviceps

Binomial name
- Chilocorus flaviceps (Miyatake, 1970)

Synonyms
- Phaenochilus flaviceps Miyatake, 1970

Species of beetle

Chilocorus flaviceps is a species of beetle of the family Coccinellidae. It is found in India (Bihar, Kerala, Tamil Nadu).

== Description ==
Adults reach a length of about 4 mm (0.16 in). The head and anterior and anterolateral corners of the pronotum are reddish or yellowish testaceous, while the elytra are black to piceous. The ventral surface (including the legs) is yellowish testaceous.
