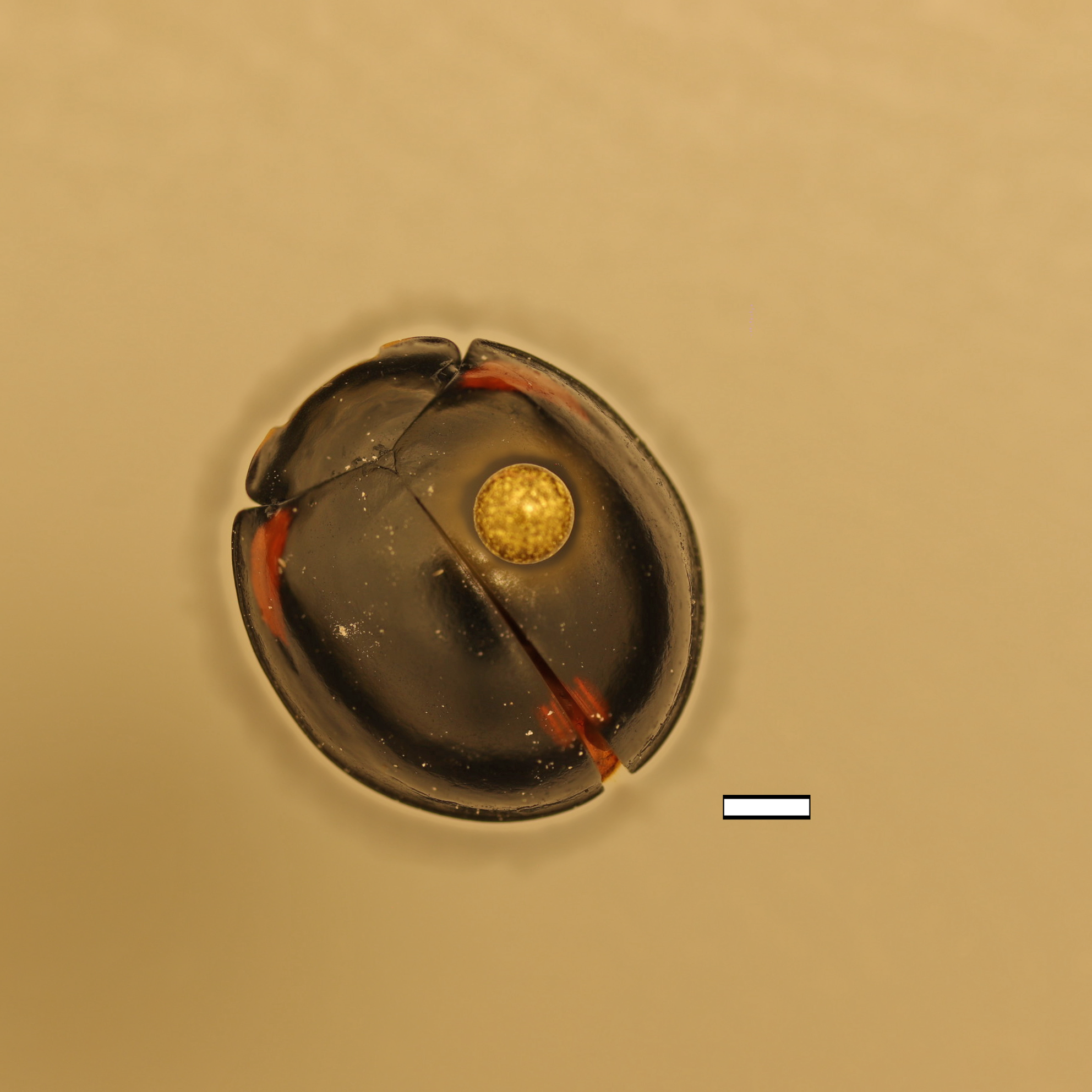

Scientific classification
- Kingdom: Animalia
- Phylum: Arthropoda
- Clade: Pancrustacea
- Class: Insecta
- Order: Coleoptera
- Suborder: Polyphaga
- Infraorder: Cucujiformia
- Family: Coccinellidae
- Genus: Axion
- Species: A. tripustulatum

Binomial name
- Axion tripustulatum (De Geer, 1775)

Synonyms
- Coccinella tripustulata De Geer, 1775; Chilocorus verrucatus Melsheimer, 1847; Axion incompletus Nunenmacher, 1911

= Axion tripustulatum =

Three-spotted lady beetle

Species of beetle

Axion tripustulatum, the three-spotted lady beetle, is a species of lady beetle in the family Coccinellidae. It is found in North America, where it has been recorded from New York to Florida, west to Colorado and Texas.

== Description ==
Adults reach a length of about 5-7 mm. Adults are black with a pale area at the anterolateral angle of pronotum. The elytron has a red or yellow subhumeral spot and a small sutural area.
