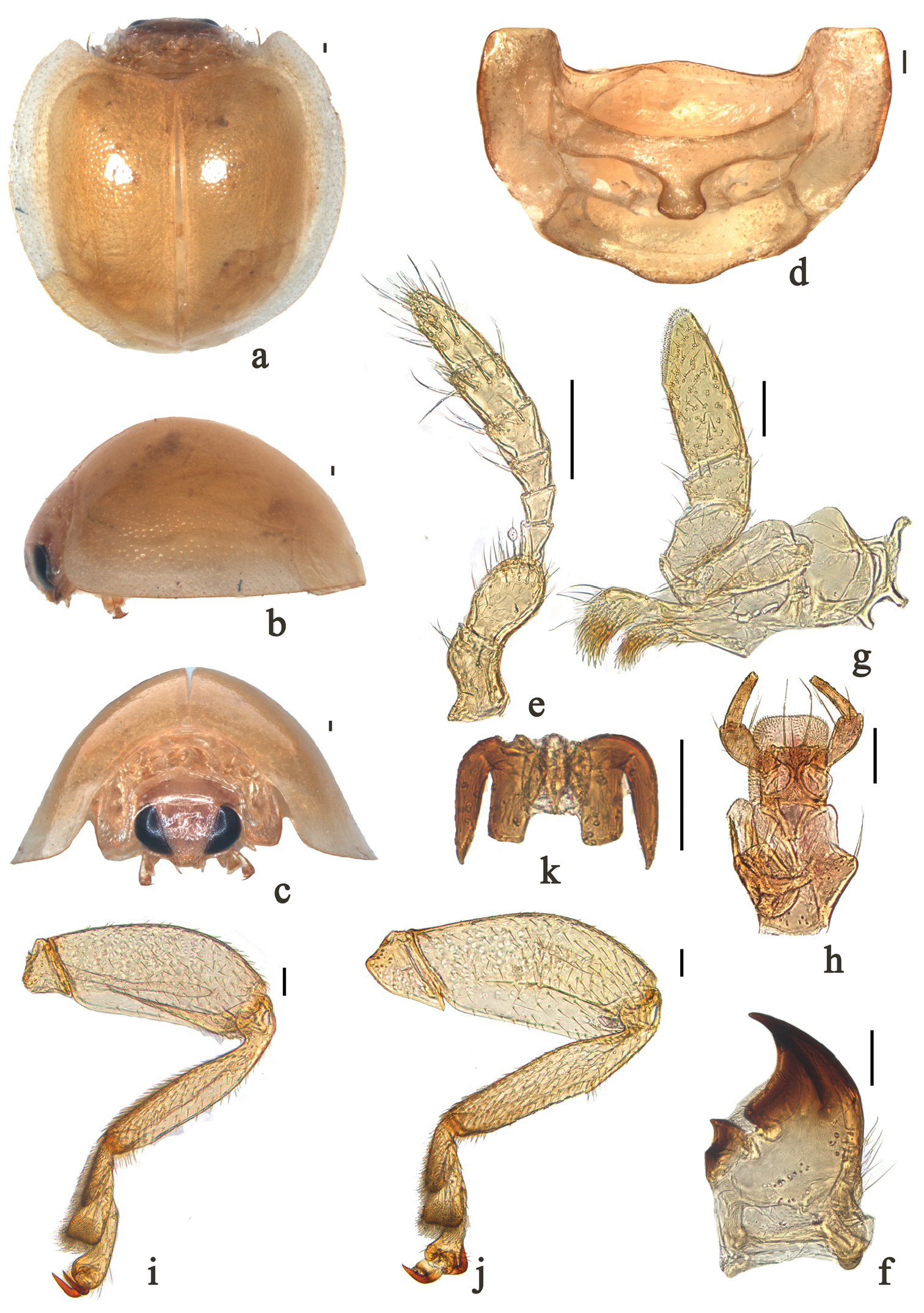

Scientific classification
- Kingdom: Animalia
- Phylum: Arthropoda
- Clade: Pancrustacea
- Class: Insecta
- Order: Coleoptera
- Suborder: Polyphaga
- Infraorder: Cucujiformia
- Family: Coccinellidae
- Genus: Chilocorus
- Species: C. albomarginalis

Binomial name
- Chilocorus albomarginalis (Li & Wang, 2017)

Synonyms
- Phaenochilus albomarginalis Li & Wang, 2017

= Chilocorus albomarginalis =

Species of beetle

Chilocorus albomarginalis is a species of beetle of the family Coccinellidae. It is found in India (Assam) and China (Yunnan).

== Description ==
Adults reach a length of about 3.67–3.8 mm (0.144–0.150 in). The dorsal and ventral surfaces are yellowish, with the elytral margins whitish and paler than the disc.
