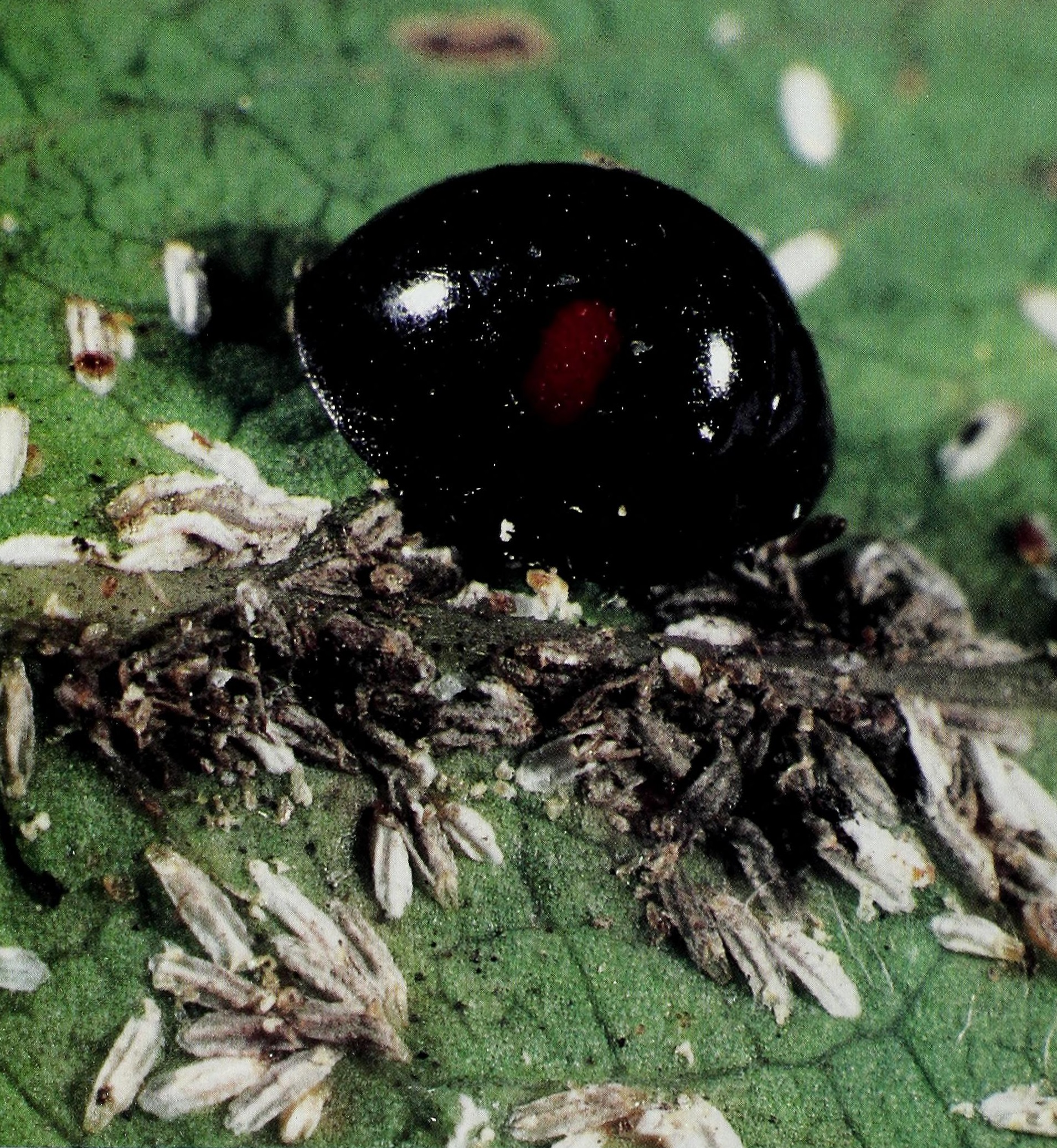
- Feeding on armored scale insects
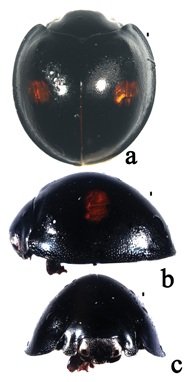

Scientific classification
- Kingdom: Animalia
- Phylum: Arthropoda
- Clade: Pancrustacea
- Class: Insecta
- Order: Coleoptera
- Suborder: Polyphaga
- Infraorder: Cucujiformia
- Family: Coccinellidae
- Genus: Chilocorus
- Species: C. kuwanae

Binomial name
- Chilocorus kuwanae Silvestri, 1909

Synonyms
- Chilocorus similis var. japonicus Sicard, 1907

= Chilocorus kuwanae =

Species of beetle

Chilocorus kuwanae, or Kuwana's lady beetle, is a species of lady beetle in the family Coccinellidae. It is native to Europe, Northern Asia, and Southern Asia, and has been introduced to North America for biological pest control.

== Description ==
Adults reach a length of about 3-4.75 mm. They are black, with a spot at or behind the middle of the elytron.
