= Chilocorus indicus =

Scientific classification
- Kingdom: Animalia
- Phylum: Arthropoda
- Clade: Pancrustacea
- Class: Insecta
- Order: Coleoptera
- Suborder: Polyphaga
- Infraorder: Cucujiformia
- Family: Coccinellidae
- Genus: Chilocorus
- Species: C. indicus

Binomial name
- Chilocorus indicus (Miyatake, 1970)

Synonyms
- Phaenochilus indicus Miyatake, 1970

Species of beetle

Chilocorus indicus is a species of beetle of the family Coccinellidae. It is found in India (Tamil Nadu).

== Description ==
The dorsal surface is yellowish without any other maculation.
