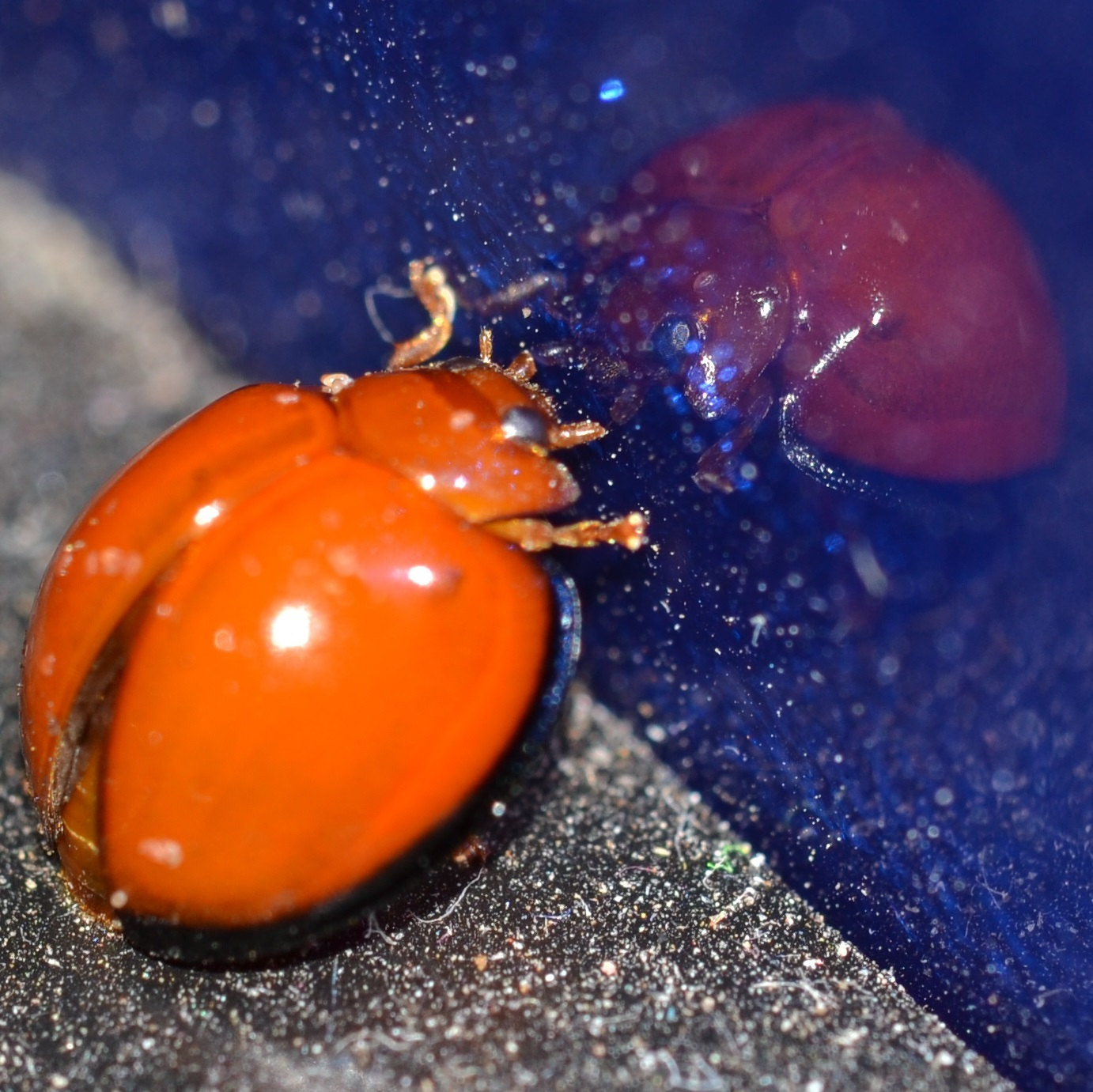

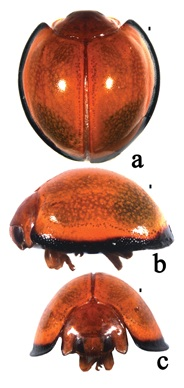

Scientific classification
- Kingdom: Animalia
- Phylum: Arthropoda
- Clade: Pancrustacea
- Class: Insecta
- Order: Coleoptera
- Suborder: Polyphaga
- Infraorder: Cucujiformia
- Family: Coccinellidae
- Genus: Chilocorus
- Species: C. circumdatus

Binomial name
- Chilocorus circumdatus (Gyllenhaal in Schönherr, 1808)

Synonyms
- Coccinella circumdata Gyllenhal in Schönherr, 1808; Chilocorus nigromaculatus Iablokoff-Khnzorian, 1972; Chilocorus nigromarginatus Motschulsky, 1859

= Chilocorus circumdatus =

Species of beetle

Chilocorus circumdatus, the red chilocorus, is a species of lady beetle in the family Coccinellidae. It is native to Southern Asia, and has been introduced to Hawaii.

== Description ==
Adults reach a length of about 4.5–5.1 mm (0.18–0.20 in). Helmet shaped, the beetle is rich in Orange-red colour with a fine black margin around the base of wings.

== Life history ==
They have been recorded preying on scale insect.
