= Selenaspidina =

Scientific classification
- Domain: Eukaryota
- Kingdom: Animalia
- Phylum: Arthropoda
- Class: Insecta
- Order: Hemiptera
- Suborder: Sternorrhyncha
- Family: Diaspididae
- Tribe: Aspidiotini
- Subtribe: Selenaspidina

Subtribe of true bugs

Selenaspidina is a subtribe of armored scale insects.

== Genera ==
- Entaspidiotus
- Mesoselenaspidus
- Neoselenaspidus
- Paraselenaspidus
- Pseudoselenaspidus
- Schizentaspidus
- Selenaspidopsis
- Selenaspidus
- Selenediella
- Selenomphalos
