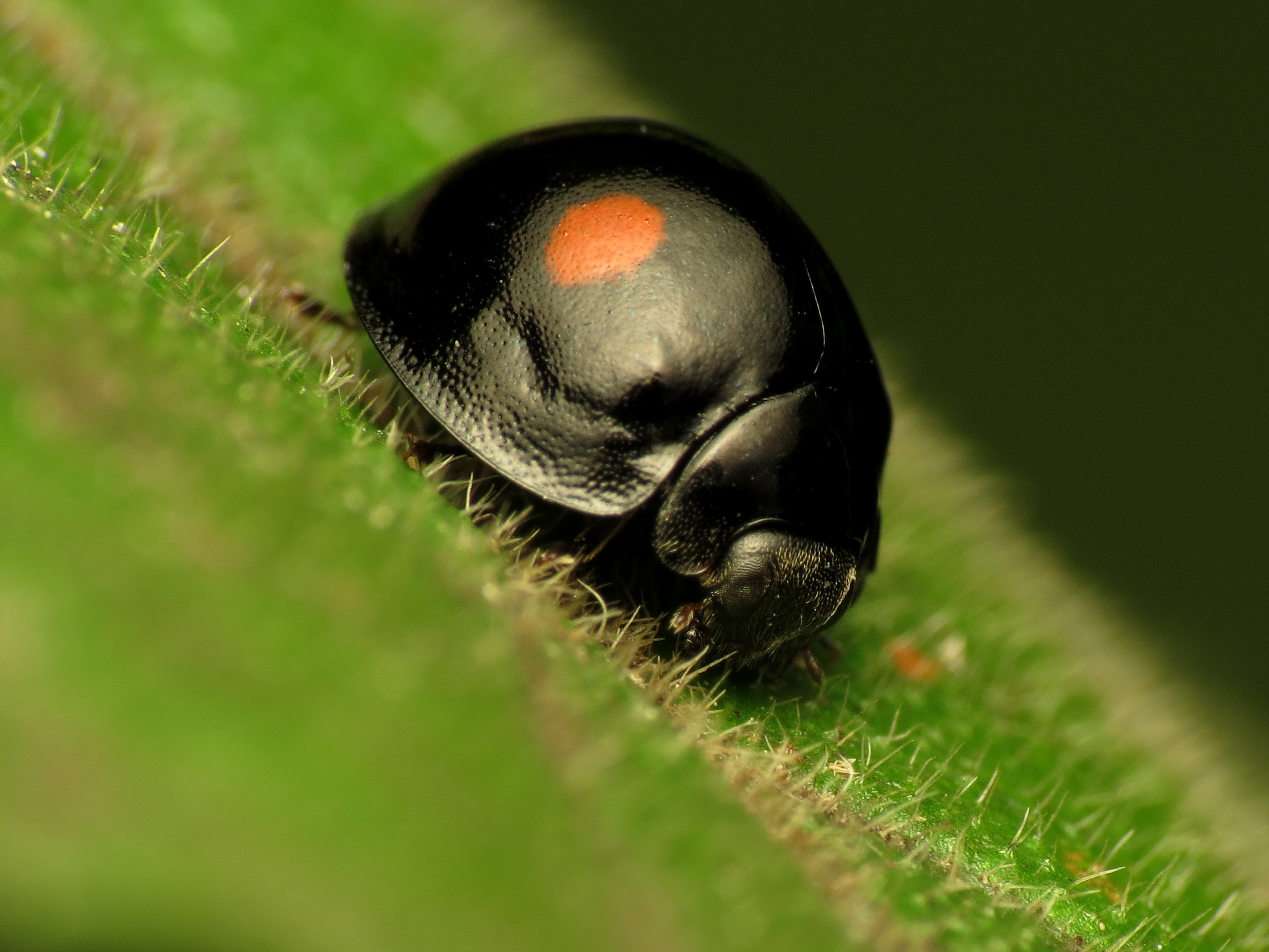

Scientific classification
- Kingdom: Animalia
- Phylum: Arthropoda
- Clade: Pancrustacea
- Class: Insecta
- Order: Coleoptera
- Suborder: Polyphaga
- Infraorder: Cucujiformia
- Family: Coccinellidae
- Genus: Chilocorus
- Species: C. stigma

Binomial name
- Chilocorus stigma (Say, 1835)

Synonyms
- Coccinella stigma Say, 1835; Chilocorus bivulnerus Mulsant, 1850

= Chilocorus stigma =

Species of beetle

Chilocorus stigma, commonly known as the twice-stabbed ladybug, is a native resident of the United States and Canada. It also has been introduced to Hawaii. It is shiny black, and there is one red spot on each elytron. The remainder of the body is black as well, but the abdomen is either yellow or red. It is sometimes confused with the "two-stabbed lady beetle", Chilocorus orbus, which is widespread in California.

== Habitat and pests eaten ==
C. stigma mainly lives within terrestrial/arboreal habitats, primarily feeding on aphids found in these habitats as well as scales (such as pine needle scale, beech bark scale and Florida red scale) and mealybugs. It is a beneficial insect, and is useful in both natural wood stands and commercial forests such as orchards and citrus groves. It is beneficial against non native species. An introduced Hemlock pest, the elongate hemlock scale (Fiorinia externa Ferris), which has been doing considerable damage to Hemlock trees throughout North America, can be moderately controlled by the presence of C. stigma. C. stigma is currently not a lady beetle that can be sold for commercial use in orchards or on farms.

== Life cycle and issues ==
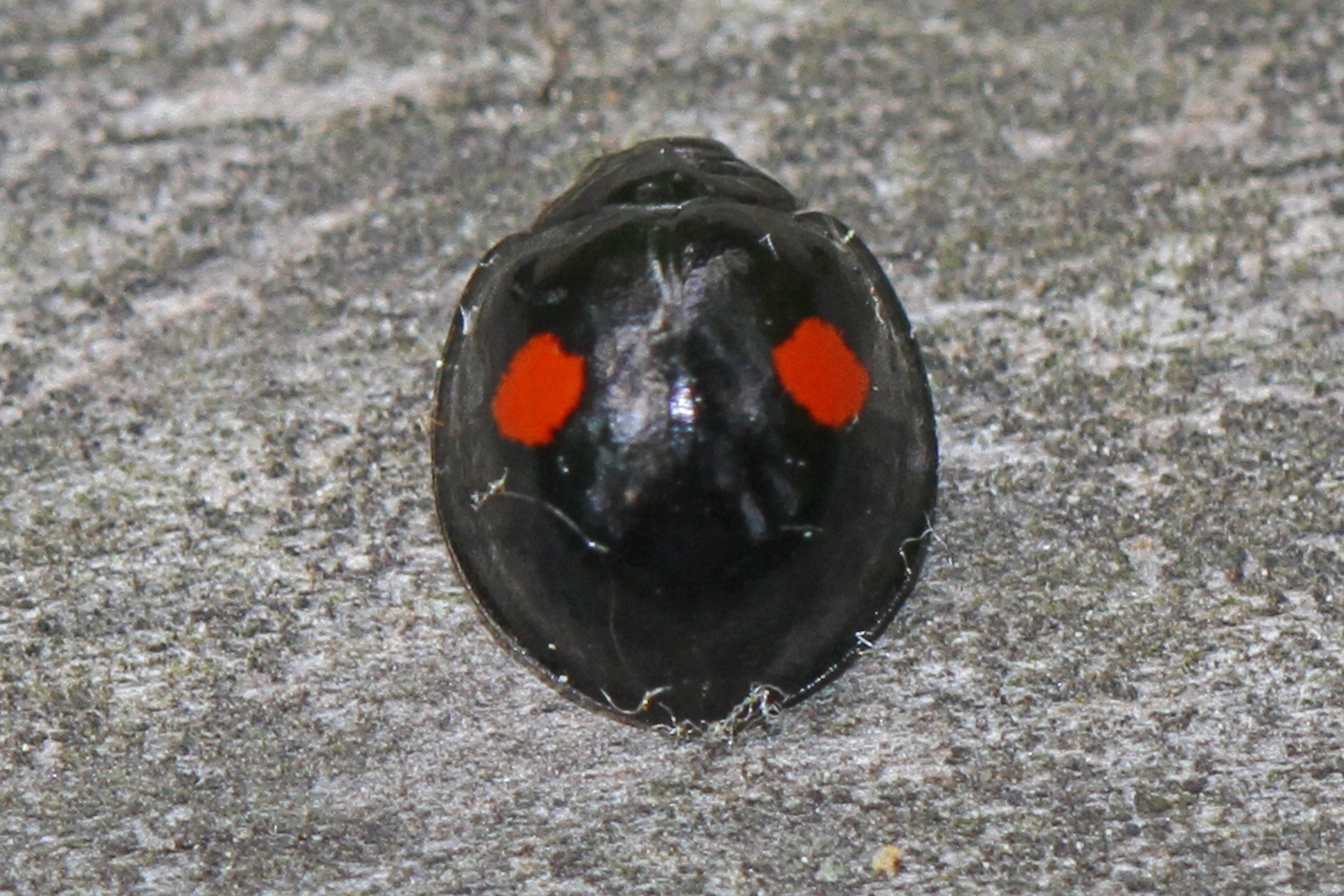
Chilocorus stigma in Leesylvania State Park, Woodbridge, Virginia

Chilocorus stigma usually completes two lifecycles a year in Canada and the North United States but may complete several lifecycles a year further down South. They overwinter in ground litter during the colder months. C. stigma has been shown, like other ladybeetles, to be susceptible to the use of insecticides diminishing its population in the wild. In order to preserve the benefits of this insect, pesticide users are encouraged to use natural alternatives to pesticide in order to curb the decline of C. stigma.

== Chromosome variation ==
The chromosomes (karyotype) of Chilocorus stigma vary from one individual to another, in both the number of chromosomes (aneuploidy) and their structure (chromosomal polymorphism). The variability occurs as a result of chromosome fusions or disassociations.
