= Carulaspis minima =

Scientific classification
- Domain: Eukaryota
- Kingdom: Animalia
- Phylum: Arthropoda
- Class: Insecta
- Order: Hemiptera
- Suborder: Sternorrhyncha
- Family: Diaspididae
- Subtribe: Diaspidina
- Genus: Carulaspis
- Species: C. minima

Binomial name
- Carulaspis minima (Signoret, 1869)

Synonyms
- Carulaspis caruelii Borchsenius, 1966; Carulaspis carueli Baccetti, 1960; Diaspis visci Leonardi, 1920; Diaspis minima Signoret, 1869; Diaspis carueli Signoret, 1869; Diaspis minima Targioni Tozzetti, 1868; Diaspis caruelii Targioni Tozzetti, 1868

Species of true bug

Carulaspis minima is an armoured scale insect, in the subtribe Diaspidina of the family Diaspididae, and is commonly known as the minute cypress scale. It was first described in 1869 by the French entomologist Victor Antoine Signoret. It feeds on evergreen conifers in the families Cephalotaxaceae, Cupressaceae and Taxodiaceae.

== Description ==
Carulaspis minima grows to a maximum length of about 1.8 mm (0.07 in). The scale covering the adult female is circular and convex, white with a yellowish-brown central portion; the female nymph is similar, but smaller. The adult male has an elongate whitish scale with the yellowish-brown remnants of the exuviae on the posterior end. The male nymph has a whitish felt-like appearance with longitudinal ridges. It is very difficult to distinguish it from the juniper scale (Carulaspis juniperi).

== Life cycle ==
The adult female scale overwinters on the host tree and lays a batch of eggs which are retained under the scale. These hatch into "crawlers", nymphs which are mobile and move to other parts of the plant. After shedding their skin for the first time, the nymphs settle down and grow through the summer. After reaching adulthood they mate, after which the males die. In California there are one or two generations in the year.

== Ecology ==
Carulaspis minima feeds on the twigs and foliage of conifers. The insects are herbivorous, feeding on phloem sap sucked from the plant's vascular system. In severe infestations the foliage may become discoloured or die, but more often the population of scale insects is kept in check by their natural enemies in the form of predatory lady beetles and parasitoid wasps, which feed on them and kill them.
