= Coccomytilina =

Scientific classification
- Domain: Eukaryota
- Kingdom: Animalia
- Phylum: Arthropoda
- Class: Insecta
- Order: Hemiptera
- Suborder: Sternorrhyncha
- Family: Diaspididae
- Subfamily: Diaspidinae
- Tribe: Lepidosaphidini
- Subtribe: Coccomytilina

Subtribe of true bugs

Coccomytilina is a subtribe of armored scale insects.

== Genera ==
- Coccomytilus
- Dactylaspis
- Evallaspis
- Finaspis
- Mauritiaspis
- Melayumytilus
- Mitulaspis
- Mohelnaspis
- Prodigiaspis
- Scleromytilus
- Triaspidis
