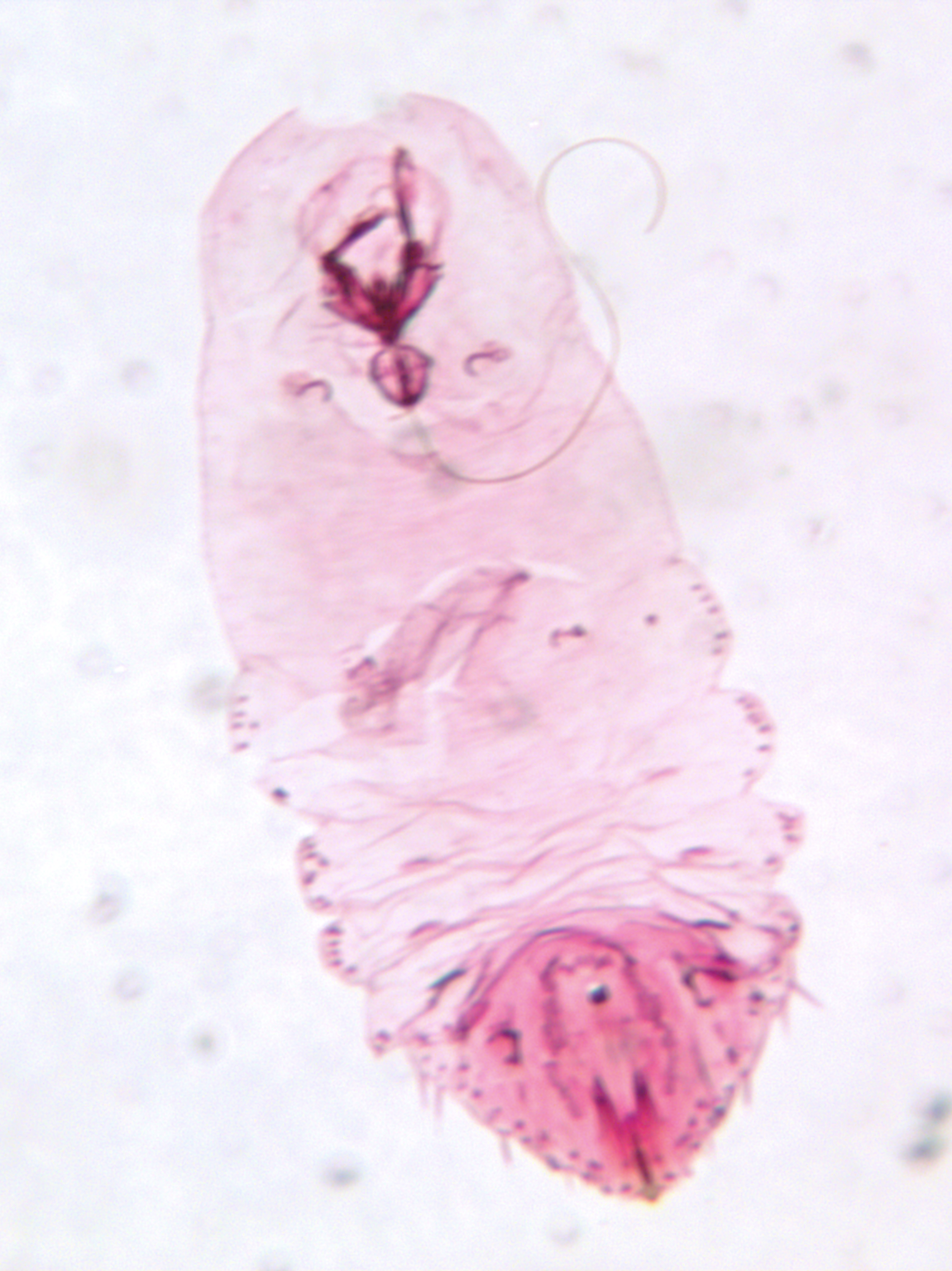
- Pinnaspis uniloba

Scientific classification
- Kingdom: Animalia
- Phylum: Arthropoda
- Class: Insecta
- Order: Hemiptera
- Suborder: Sternorrhyncha
- Family: Diaspididae
- Subfamily: Diaspidinae
- Tribe: Diaspidini
- Subtribe: Chionaspidina
- Genus: Pinnaspis; Cockerell, 1892

= Pinnaspis =

Genus of true bugs

Pinnaspis, first described by Theodore Dru Alison Cockerell in 1892, is a genus of scale insects belonging to the family Diaspididae, or armored scale insects. There are currently 42 species within the genus Pinnaspis.

== Description ==
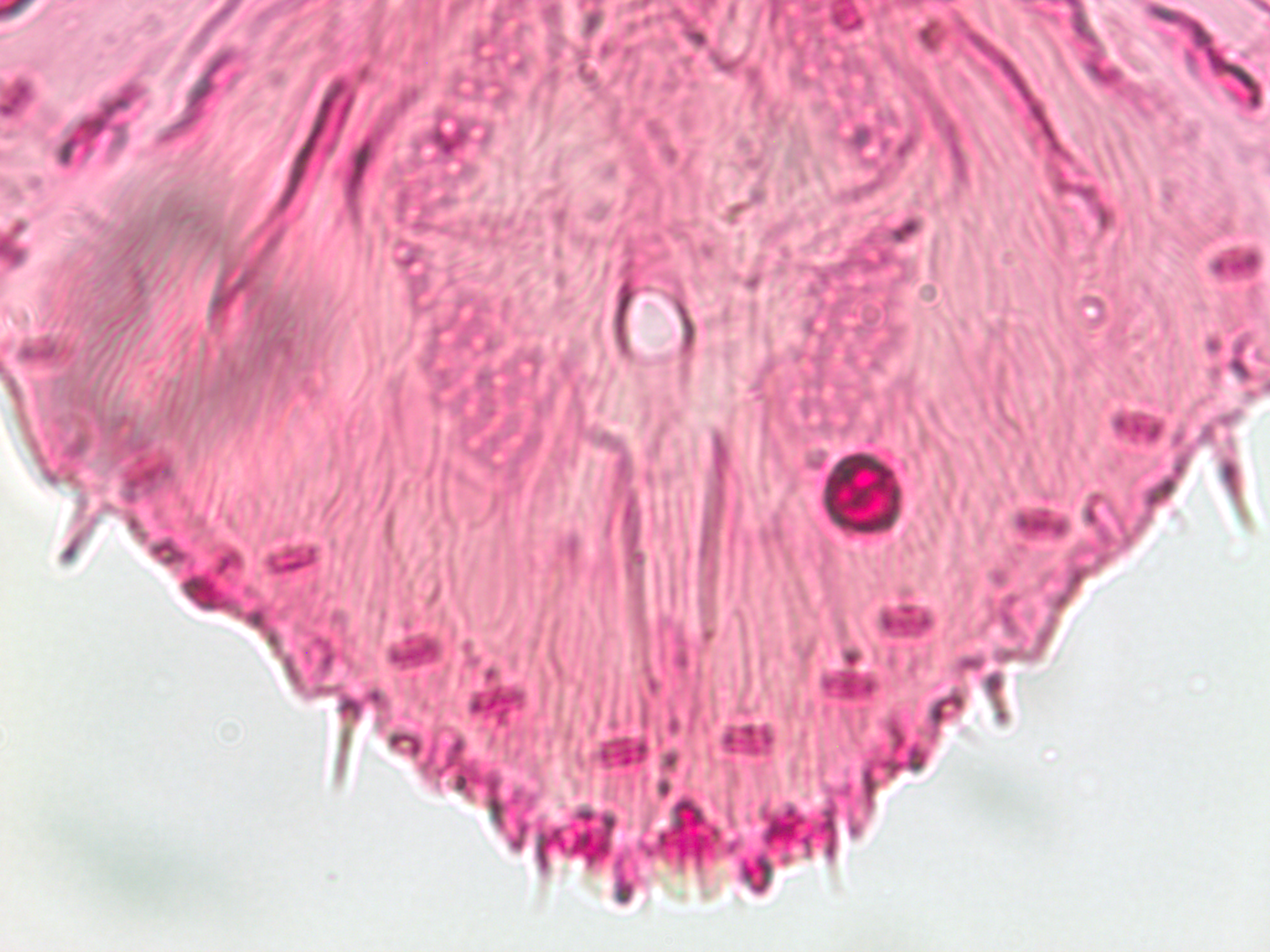
Pygidium of Pinnaspis buxi illustrates medial zygosis and macroduct shape.

In this genus the median lobes are parallel and united by a medial zygosis. Two-barred macroducts, a bi-lobed or absent second lobe, and gland spines, rather than fringed plates between pygidial lobes, and lobed pre-pygidial abdominal segments are characteristic of Pinnaspis.

== Biology ==
Like all members of the family Diaspididae in Pinnaspis the females are primarily sessile, molting twice before reaching the adult stage. The first instar, referred to as a crawler, due to the presence of small legs and the dispersal function of this stage. The second instar and adult female lack legs and wings, and have greatly reduced to absent antenna and eyes. A protective covering of wax is produced by the first and second instars and the adult female. The male undergoes four molts before reaching the adult stage, which is legged, winged, and has antenna and eyes. The species Pinnaspis buxi is thought to be parthenogenic, as male scales have not been found.

== Distribution ==
The genus Pinnaspis most likely originated in Asia, with the highest diversity of species found in Asia. Three species, Pinnaspis aspidistrae, the fern scale, Pinnaspis buxi, the boxwood scale, and Pinnaspis strachani, the lesser snow scale have widespread cosmopolitan distributions. These three species can be found on every continent but Antarctica.

== Importance ==
Many species that fall within Pinnaspis are not pests, but the genus includes some serious pests. Pinnaspis aspidistrae and Pinnaspis strachani have been identified as serious pests. Both P. aspidistrae and P. strachani are considered polyphagous. P. aspidistrae is recorded to feed on around 60 genera, including, Citrus, and several types of ferns. P. strachani is recorded to feed on over 60 genera, most commonly found on, Citrus, Cocus and Hibiscus. Pinnaspis buxi is also considered a pest, though not as serious a pest as P. aspidistrae or P. strachani.

== List of species ==
- Pinnaspis alatae
- Pinnaspis albizziae
- Pinnaspis aspidistrae
- Pinnaspis boehmeriae
- Pinnaspis buxi
- Pinnaspis chamaecyparidis
- Pinnaspis diaspiformis
- Pinnaspis dracaenae
- Pinnaspis exercitata
- Pinnaspis fici
- Pinnaspis fonsecai
- Pinnaspis frontalis
- Pinnaspis hainnanensis
- Pinnaspis hibisci
- Pinnaspis hikosana
- Pinnaspis indivisa
- Pinnaspis javanensis
- Pinnaspis juniperi
- Pinnaspis liui
- Pinnaspis longula
- Pinnaspis melaleucae
- Pinnaspis minima
- Pinnaspis muntingi
- Pinnaspis musae
- Pinnaspis mussaendae
- Pinnaspis orlandi
- Pinnaspis piperis
- Pinnaspis pseudotuberculatus
- Pinnaspis rhododendri
- Pinnaspis rombica
- Pinnaspis sciadopityos
- Pinnaspis scrobicularum
- Pinnaspis serrulata
- Pinnaspis shirozui
- Pinnaspis siamensis
- Pinnaspis simplior
- Pinnaspis strachani
- Pinnaspis theae
- Pinnaspis tuberculata
- Pinnaspis uniloba
- Pinnaspis uvariae
- Pinnaspis yamamotoi

== Notes on species in Pinnaspis ==
Pinnaspis orlandi (Leonardi) and Pinnaspis robica Leonardi all lack definite distinguishing characters in their descriptions. The illustration of Pinnaspis orlandi suggests that it may be Pinnaspis strachani.

Pinnaspis aspidistrae and Pinnaspis strachani are highly morphologically similar. These two species may possibly containing multiple cryptic species, or form one highly variable species.
