= Coronaspis =

Scientific classification
- Kingdom: Animalia
- Phylum: Arthropoda
- Class: Insecta
- Order: Hemiptera
- Suborder: Sternorrhyncha
- Family: Diaspididae
- Subfamily: Diaspidinae
- Tribe: Diaspidini
- Subtribe: Fioriniina
- Genus: Coronaspis; MacGillivray, 1921

Genus of insects

Coronaspis is a genus of true bugs belonging to the family Diaspididae.

Species:

- Coronaspis coronifera (Green, 1905)
- Coronaspis malabarica (Takagi, 1999)
- Coronaspis malesiana (Takagi, 1999)
