= Howardiina =

Scientific classification
- Domain: Eukaryota
- Kingdom: Animalia
- Phylum: Arthropoda
- Class: Insecta
- Order: Hemiptera
- Suborder: Sternorrhyncha
- Family: Diaspididae
- Subfamily: Diaspidinae
- Tribe: Lepidosaphidini
- Subtribe: Howardiina

Subtribe of true bugs

Howardiina is a subtribe of armored scale insects.

== Genera ==
- Ambigaspis
- Ferrisidea
- Howardia
- Hulaspis
- Kandraspis
- Multispinaspis
- Paradiaspis
- Paraepidiaspis
- Parapudaspis
- Praecocaspis
- Pudaspis
