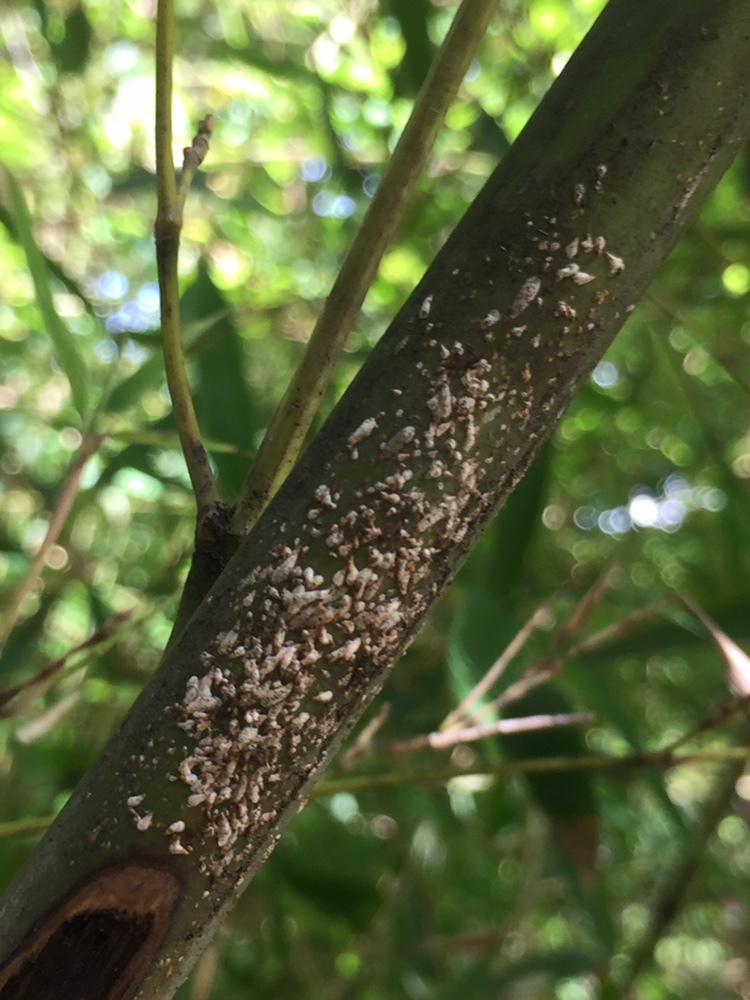
- Kuwanaspis pseudoleucaspis, bamboo diaspidid, New Zealand

Scientific classification
- Kingdom: Animalia
- Phylum: Arthropoda
- Class: Insecta
- Order: Hemiptera
- Suborder: Sternorrhyncha
- Family: Diaspididae
- Subfamily: Diaspidinae
- Tribe: Diaspidini
- Subtribe: Fioriniina
- Genus: Kuwanaspis; Macgillivray, 1921

Synonyms
- Chuaspis Tao & Wong, 1982

= Kuwanaspis =

Genus of scale insects

Kuwanaspis is a genus of armoured scales in the family Diaspididae. These scale insects typically feed on Bamboo plants such as Phyllostachys heteroclada (fishscale bamboo) and Pleioblastus amarus (bitter bamboo).

== Species ==
These 20 species belong to the genus Kuwanaspis:

- Kuwanaspis annandalei (Green, 1919) (China, India, Taiwan)
- Kuwanaspis arundinariae Takahashi, 1938 (China, Taiwan)
- Kuwanaspis bambusicola (Cockerell, 1899)
- Kuwanaspis bambusifoliae (Takahashi, 1934) (China, Taiwan)
- Kuwanaspis daliensis Hu, 1982 (China)
- Kuwanaspis elongata (Takahashi, 1930) (China, Taiwan)
- Kuwanaspis elongatoides H.u.Tang, 1986 (China)
- Kuwanaspis foliosa Wu, 1986 (China)
- Kuwanaspis hikosani (Kuwana, 1902)
- Kuwanaspis howardi (Cooley, 1898) (bamboo white scale)
- Kuwanaspis linearis (Green, 1922) (bamboo long scale)
- Kuwanaspis multipora Tang, 1986 (China)
- Kuwanaspis neolinearis (Takahashi, 1930) (Asia)
- Kuwanaspis pectinata Takagi, 1999 (Malaysia)
- Kuwanaspis phragmitis (Takahashi, 1931) (Taiwan)
- Kuwanaspis pseudoleucaspis (Kuwana, 1923) (bamboo diaspidid)
- Kuwanaspis suishana (Takahashi, 1930) (Asia)
- Kuwanaspis takahashii Takagi, 1961 (Japan)
- Kuwanaspis tanzawensis Takagi & Kawai, 1966 (Japan)
- Kuwanaspis vermiformis (Takahashi, 1930)
