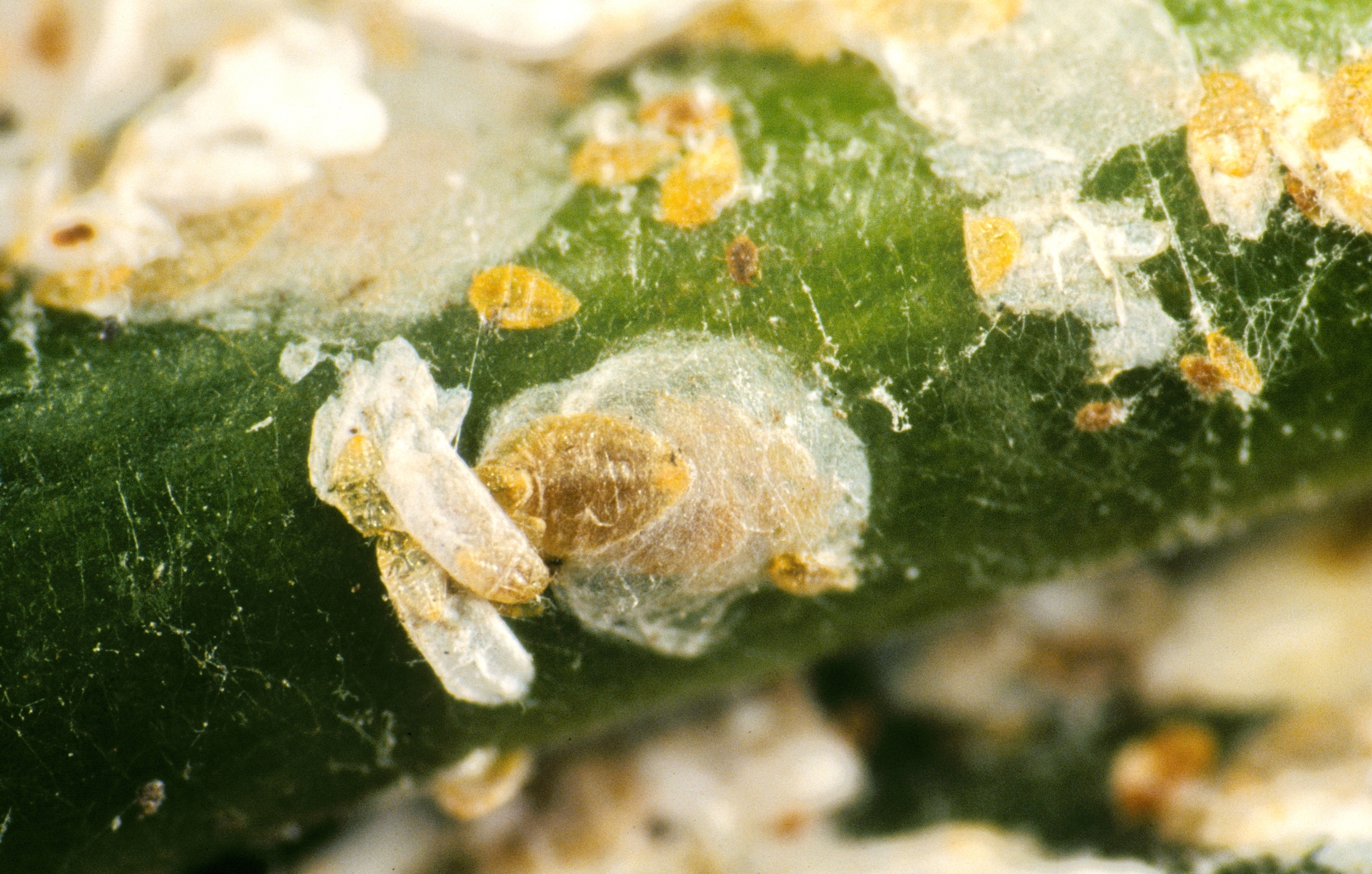
- Aulacaspis yasumatsui the cycad aulacaspis scale

Scientific classification
- Domain: Eukaryota
- Kingdom: Animalia
- Phylum: Arthropoda
- Class: Insecta
- Order: Hemiptera
- Suborder: Sternorrhyncha
- Family: Diaspididae
- Tribe: Diaspidini
- Subtribe: Chionaspidina; Brues & Melander

Synonyms
- Protodiaspidina Takagi; Ulucoccinae Takagi

= Chionaspidina =

Subtribe of scale insects

Chionaspidina is a subtribe of armored scale insects established by Borchenius. But unlike many of the subtribes recognized by Borchenius, this one was found to be morphologically valid by Takagi. Similarly, in molecular analysis, Andersen et al. found a clade roughly corresponding to the subtribe Chionaspidina.

Geographical sampling and analysis indicated a number of unnamed species in the genus Chionaspis and by inference in the Chionaspidina.

== Genera ==
The following genera are members of the subtribe Chionaspidina.

- Afiorinia Takagi, 1970
- Amphisoma Takagi, 1995
- Anaimalaia Takagi, 1995
- Aulacaspis Cockerell, 1893
- Balachowskiella Kaussari, 1955
- Cameronaspis Takagi Pong & Ghee, 1988
- Chionandaspis Takagi, 2008
- Chionaspis Signoret, 1868
- Cupidaspis MacGillivray, 1921
- Damaia Takagi, 2003
- Dungunia Takagi, 1993
- Duplachionaspis MacGillivray, 1921
- Duplaspis Goux, 1937
- Fijifiorinia Williams & Watson, 1988
- Greenaspis MacGillivray, 1921
- Guineaspis Balachowsky, 1952
- Guizhoaspis Young, 1986
- Hemiaspidis MacGillivray, 1921
- Hybridaspis Green, 1926
- Kuchingaspis Takagi, 2005
- Kyphosoma Takagi, 1993
- Larutaspis Takagi, 2005
- Marchalaspis MacGillivray, 1921
- Megacanthaspis Takagi, 1960
- Myrtaspis Takagi, 1999
- Narayanaspis Takagi, 1998
- Neochionaspis Borchsenius, 1974
- Neoquernaspis Howell & Takagi, 1981
- Pentacicola Takagi, 1993
- Pinangaspis Takagi, 2003
- Pinnaspis Cockerell, 1892
- Protodiaspis Cockerell, 1898
- Quernaspis Ferris, 1937
- Semonggokia Takagi, 2003
- Serenaspis Henderson, 2011
- Serrachionaspis Young, 1986
- Shansiaspis Tang, 1981
- Sinoquernaspis Takagi & Tang, 1982
- Sphaeroceraspis Balachowsky & Ferrero, 1965
- Takagiaspis Varshney, 2002
- Takahashiaspis Takagi, 1961
- Tamuraspis Takagi, 1989
- Tanaparlatoria Mamet, 1962
- Thoa Takagi, 1993
- Trullifiorinia Leonardi, 1906
- Ulucoccus Takagi Pong & Ghee, 1990
- Unaspis MacGillivray, 1921
- Yuanaspis Young, 1986
