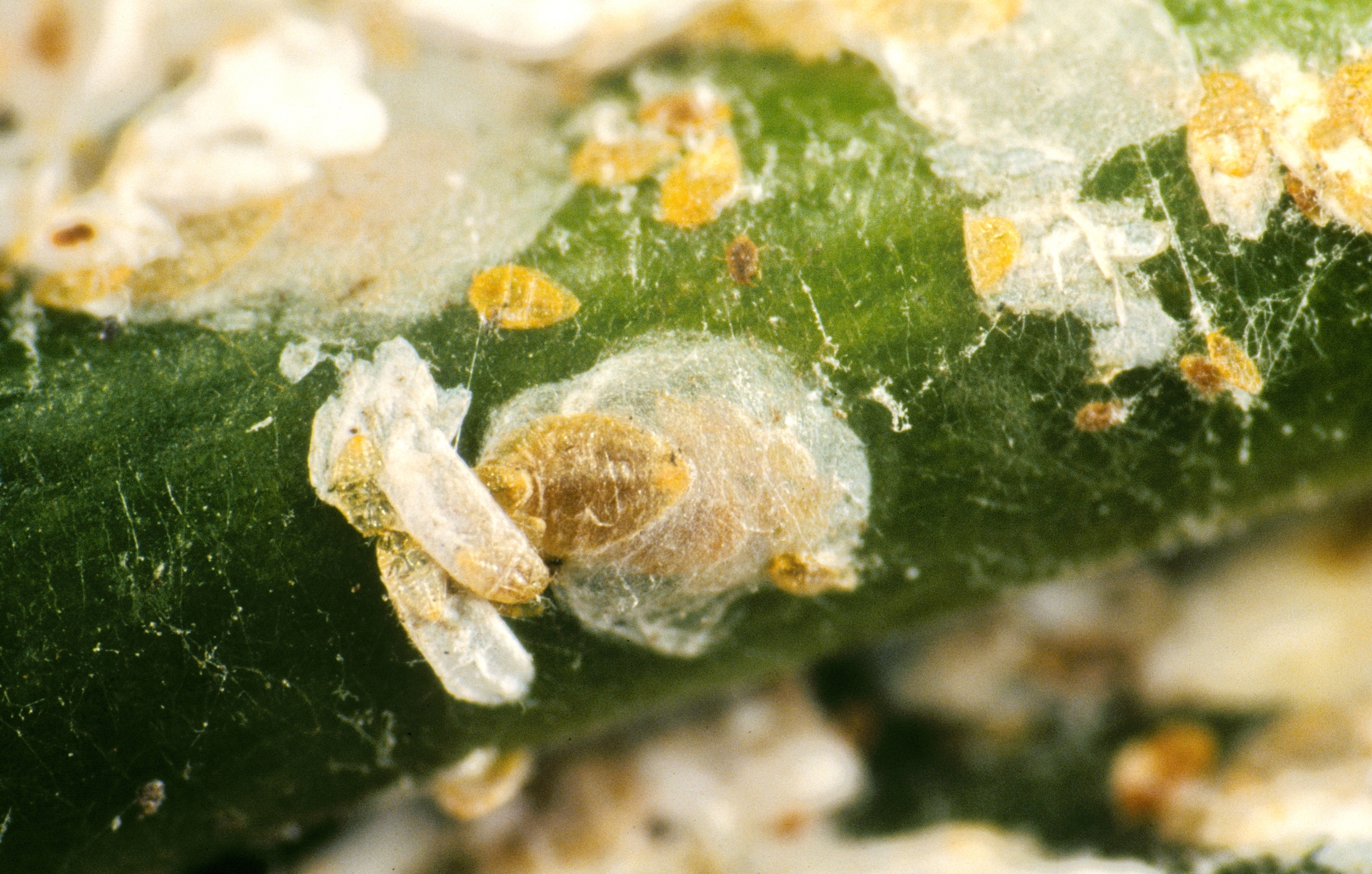
- Aulacaspis yasumatsui the cycad aulacaspis scale

Scientific classification
- Domain: Eukaryota
- Kingdom: Animalia
- Phylum: Arthropoda
- Class: Insecta
- Order: Hemiptera
- Suborder: Sternorrhyncha
- Superfamily: Coccoidea
- Family: Diaspididae
- Subfamily: Diaspidinae
- Tribe: Diaspidini
- Genus: Aulacaspis; Cockerell, 1893

Species
- See text

= Aulacaspis =

Genus of true bugs

Aulacaspis, is a scale insect genus in the family Diaspididae. The type species is Aulacaspis rosae.

== Species ==
- Aulacaspis aceris Takahashi, 1935
- Aulacaspis actinidiae Takagi, 1970
- Aulacaspis actinodaphnes Takagi, 1970
- Aulacaspis alangii Takagi, 2013
- Aulacaspis alisiana Takagi, 1970
- Aulacaspis altiplagae Chen, 1983
- Aulacaspis amamiana Takagi, 1961
- Aulacaspis australis Brimblecombe, 1959
- Aulacaspis bambusae (Green, 1922)
- Aulacaspis baukiana Takagi, 1999
- Aulacaspis buteae Takahashi, 1942
- Aulacaspis calcarata Takagi, 1999
- Aulacaspis calophylli Takagi, 1999
- Aulacaspis cambodiensis Takahashi, 1942
- Aulacaspis citri Chen, 1954
- Aulacaspis constricta Takagi & De Faveri, 2011
- Aulacaspis crawii (Cockerell, 1898)

originally Diaspis crawii var. fulleri

- Aulacaspis depressa (Zehntner, 1897)
- Aulacaspis difficilis (Cockerell, 1896)
- Aulacaspis discorum Hall & Williams, 1962
- Aulacaspis distylii Takahashi, 1955
- Aulacaspis divergens Takahashi, 1935
- Aulacaspis elaeagni (Green, 1896)
- Aulacaspis ericacearum Takagi, 1961
- Aulacaspis fagraeae (Green, 1896)
- Aulacaspis ferrisi Scott, 1952
- Aulacaspis fici Takagi, 2013
- Aulacaspis formosana (Takahashi, 1934)
- Aulacaspis fuzhouensis Tang, 1986
- Aulacaspis greeni Takahashi, 1934
- Aulacaspis guangdongensis Chen, Wu & Su, 1980
- Aulacaspis gudalura (Green, 1919)
- Aulacaspis hedyotidis (Green, 1899)
- Aulacaspis heneratgoda (Green, 1922)
- Aulacaspis herbae (Green, 1899)
- Aulacaspis ima Scott, 1952
- Aulacaspis intermedia Chen, Wu & Su, 1980
- Aulacaspis isobeae Takagi, 1965
- Aulacaspis javanensis Newstead, 1908
- Aulacaspis kadsurae Takagi & Kawai, 1966
- Aulacaspis kenyae (Hall, 1946)
- Aulacaspis kuzunoi Kuwana & Muramatsu, 1932
- Aulacaspis latissima (Cockerell, 1897)
- Aulacaspis ligulata Takagi, 1988
- Aulacaspis litseae Tang, 1986
- Aulacaspis litsearum Takagi, 2013
- Aulacaspis litzeae (Green, 1896)
- Aulacaspis longanae Chen, Wu & Su, 1980
- Aulacaspis loranthi (Green, 1900)
- Aulacaspis madiunensis (Zehntner, 1898)

originally Chionapsis madiunensis

- Aulacaspis mali Borchsenius, 1938
- Aulacaspis mischocarpi (Cockerell & Robinson)

synonym: Phencaspis thoracica

- Aulacaspis otophorae Takagi, 2013
- Aulacaspis rosae Bouché, 1833
- Aulacaspis rosarum Borchsenius, 1958
- Aulacaspis shoreae Takagi, 2013
- Aulacaspis takarai Takagi, 1965
- Aulacaspis tegalensis (Zehntner, 1897)
- Aulacaspis thoracica (Robinson, 1917)
- Aulacaspis thorntoni Williams & Miller, 2010
- Aulacaspis yabunikkei Kuwana, 1926
- Aulacaspis yasumatsui Takagi, 1977

=== Former species ===
- Aulacaspis malayala Varshney, 2002 invalid

== Gallery ==
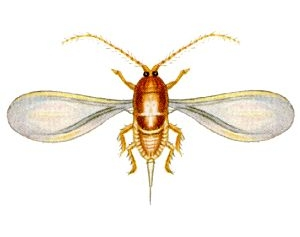
Rose scale, male. Aulacaspis rosae.
