= K. linearis =

K. linearis may refer to:

- Krameria linearis, a synonym for Krameria lappacea, a plant species
- Kuwanaspis linearis, the bamboo long scale, a scale insect species in the genus Kuwanaspis

== See also ==
- Linearis
