= Aulacaspis tegalensis =

Sugarcane scale

Scientific classification
- Domain: Eukaryota
- Kingdom: Animalia
- Phylum: Arthropoda
- Class: Insecta
- Order: Hemiptera
- Suborder: Sternorrhyncha
- Family: Diaspididae
- Genus: Aulacaspis
- Species: A. tegalensis

Binomial name
- Aulacaspis tegalensis (Zehntner, 1898)

Synonyms
- Aulacaspis major (Rutherford, 1916); Aulacaspis rutherfordi (Morrison, 1924); Chionaspis tegalensis Zehntner, 1898

Species of true bug

Aulacaspis tegalensis, known as sugarcane scale or white scale, is a scale insect species in the family Diaspididae.

The species is distributed across east Africa and southern Asia, with records from Madagascar, Kenya, Thailand, Tanzania, Taiwan, Reunion, Singapore, Uganda, Seychelles, Papua New Guinea, Mauritius, Indonesia, India, Federated States of Micronesia, Malaysia and the Philippines. They typically feed on stems, and are known to disperse in their first instar.
