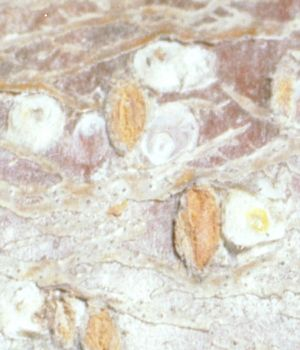

Scientific classification
- Domain: Eukaryota
- Kingdom: Animalia
- Phylum: Arthropoda
- Class: Insecta
- Order: Hemiptera
- Suborder: Sternorrhyncha
- Family: Diaspididae
- Genus: Pseudaulacaspis
- Species: P. pentagona

Binomial name
- Pseudaulacaspis pentagona (Targioni Tozzetti, 1886)

= Pseudaulacaspis pentagona =

Species of true bug

Pseudaulacaspis pentagona, the white peach scale or mulberry scale, is a species of armoured scale insect in the family Diaspididae. This scale infests over 100 different genera of plants including many fruit trees and ornamentals.

== Description ==
The adult female insect is up to 2.5 mm (0.10 in) in length. The soft yellow body is concealed under a roughly circular, whitish test with a yellowish-brown off-centre spot (this is the exuviae or shed skins of the last two nymphal moults). Males are concealed under whitish, felted, elongated oval tests with yellowish spots at one end; sometimes many males will accumulate in one area, covering the bark and looking like snow. Mature males have no mouthparts but have wings and seek out females, while mature females do not have wings and remain permanently in one place.

== Distribution ==
Pseudaulacaspis pentagona is native to eastern Asia but has been accidentally introduced into many other warm and temperate parts of the world. In Europe, it was first detected in Italy in the nineteenth century and is now additionally found in Azerbaijan, Bulgaria, France, Georgia, Germany, Greece, Hungary, Macedonia, Malta, Montenegro, Netherlands, Portugal, Russia, Serbia, Spain, Sweden, Switzerland, Turkey and Ukraine. In the twenty-first century it has been spreading northwards, perhaps because of climate change, but is restricted to greenhouses in cooler climates such as Sweden.

== Hosts ==
Pseudaulacaspis pentagona is polyphagous, meaning that it has many plant hosts. It is particularly a pest of fruit trees such as peach, plum, apricot, cherry, currant, grape, pawpaw, fig, mulberry, apple, pear, kiwi fruit and walnut. It also infests various ornamental plants, including Sophora, Sorbus, Syringa, Catalpa, Euonymus, Philadelphus and Paulownia.

== Life cycle ==
Mature females lay 100 to 150 eggs, the number largely depending on the food plant. The eggs hatch after three or four days; those destined to be males are orange while female eggs are white. The newly hatched first instar nymphs are mobile and disperse to other parts of the plant. Males have five instars while females have three; the later instars are immobile, sinking their mouthparts into the plant tissues to extract sap. There may be up to four generations each year. In the United States, a generation is completed in about 38 days in summer and about 85 days in winter. In cold climates, adult females survive the winter even when the temperature falls as low as −20 °C (−4 °F). Dispersal to new locations may occur when nymphs are blown away or adhere to birds or flying insects; and also occurs with the transport of nursery stock.
