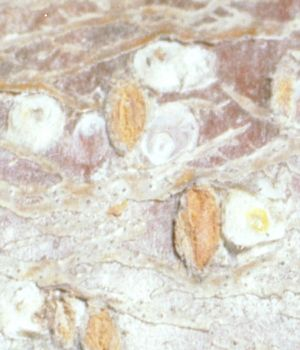
- Pseudaulacaspis pentagona

Scientific classification
- Domain: Eukaryota
- Kingdom: Animalia
- Phylum: Arthropoda
- Class: Insecta
- Order: Hemiptera
- Suborder: Sternorrhyncha
- Family: Diaspididae
- Subtribe: Fioriniina
- Genus: Pseudaulacaspis

= Pseudaulacaspis =

Genus of true bugs

Pseudaulacaspis is a genus of scales and mealybugs in the family Diaspididae. There are at least 60 described species in Pseudaulacaspis.

== Species ==
- Pseudaulacaspis abbrideliae (Chen, 1983)
- Pseudaulacaspis australis (Laing, 1925)
- Pseudaulacaspis barberi (Green, 1908)
- Pseudaulacaspis biformis Takagi, 1956
- Pseudaulacaspis brideliae (Takahashi, 1933)
- Pseudaulacaspis brimblecombei Williams, 1973
- Pseudaulacaspis camelliae (Chen, 1983)
- Pseudaulacaspis canarium Hu, 1986
- Pseudaulacaspis celtis (Kuwana, 1928)
- Pseudaulacaspis centreesa (Ferris, 1953)
- Pseudaulacaspis chinensis (Cockerell in Craw, 1896)
- Pseudaulacaspis cockerelli (Cooley, 1897)
- Pseudaulacaspis coloisuvae Williams & Watson, 1988
- Pseudaulacaspis cordylinidis (Maskell, 1879)
- Pseudaulacaspis dendrobii (Kuwana in Kuwana & Muramatsu, 1931)
- Pseudaulacaspis difissata (Brimblecombe, 1959)
- Pseudaulacaspis dubia (Maskell, 1882)
- Pseudaulacaspis ericacea (Ferris, 1953)
- Pseudaulacaspis ernesti Miller & Gimpel, 2002
- Pseudaulacaspis eucalypticola Tang, 1986
- Pseudaulacaspis eugeniae (Maskell, 1892)
- Pseudaulacaspis ficicola Tang, 1986
- Pseudaulacaspis forsythiae (Kanda, 1941)
- Pseudaulacaspis frutescens (Hu, 1986)
- Pseudaulacaspis grandilobis (Maskell, 1894)
- Pseudaulacaspis gynandropsidis (Green, 1922)
- Pseudaulacaspis hartii (Laing, 1929)
- Pseudaulacaspis hilli (Laing, 1929)
- Pseudaulacaspis kentiae (Kuwana, 1931)
- Pseudaulacaspis kiushiuensis (Kuwana, 1909)
- Pseudaulacaspis latiloba (Takagi & Kawai, 1966)
- Pseudaulacaspis latisoma (Chen, 1983)
- Pseudaulacaspis leveri Williams & Watson, 1988
- Pseudaulacaspis loncerae Tang, 1986
- Pseudaulacaspis manni (Green in Green & Mann, 1907)
- Pseudaulacaspis megacauda Takagi, 1970
- Pseudaulacaspis megaloba (Green, 1899)
- Pseudaulacaspis mirabilis Hu, 1986
- Pseudaulacaspis miyakoensis (Kuwana in Kuwana & Muramatsu, 1931)
- Pseudaulacaspis momi (Kuwana, 1931)
- Pseudaulacaspis multiducta Williams & Watson, 1988
- Pseudaulacaspis nishikigi (Kanda, 1941)
- Pseudaulacaspis nitida (Maskell, 1892)
- Pseudaulacaspis papayae (Takahashi, 1942)
- Pseudaulacaspis papulosa Williams & Watson, 1988
- Pseudaulacaspis pentagona (Targioni Tozzetti, 1886)
- Pseudaulacaspis phymatodidis (Maskell, 1880)
- Pseudaulacaspis poloosta (Ferris, 1953)
- Pseudaulacaspis polygoni (Green, 1899)
- Pseudaulacaspis ponticula Williams & Watson, 1988
- Pseudaulacaspis prunicola
- Pseudaulacaspis samoana (Doane & Ferris, 1916)
- Pseudaulacaspis sasakawai Takagi, 1970
- Pseudaulacaspis simplex Takagi, 1961
- Pseudaulacaspis sordida Hempel, 1932
- Pseudaulacaspis strobilanthi (Green, 1905)
- Pseudaulacaspis subcorticalis (Green, 1905)
- Pseudaulacaspis subrhombica (Chen, 1983)
- Pseudaulacaspis syzygicola Tang, 1986
- Pseudaulacaspis taiwana (Takahashi, 1935)
- Pseudaulacaspis takahashii (Ferris, 1955)
- Pseudaulacaspis tenera (Green, 1922)
- Pseudaulacaspis ulmicola Tang in Tang & Li, 1988
- Pseudaulacaspis varicosa (Green, 1896)
- Pseudaulacaspis xerotidis (Maskell, 1895)
