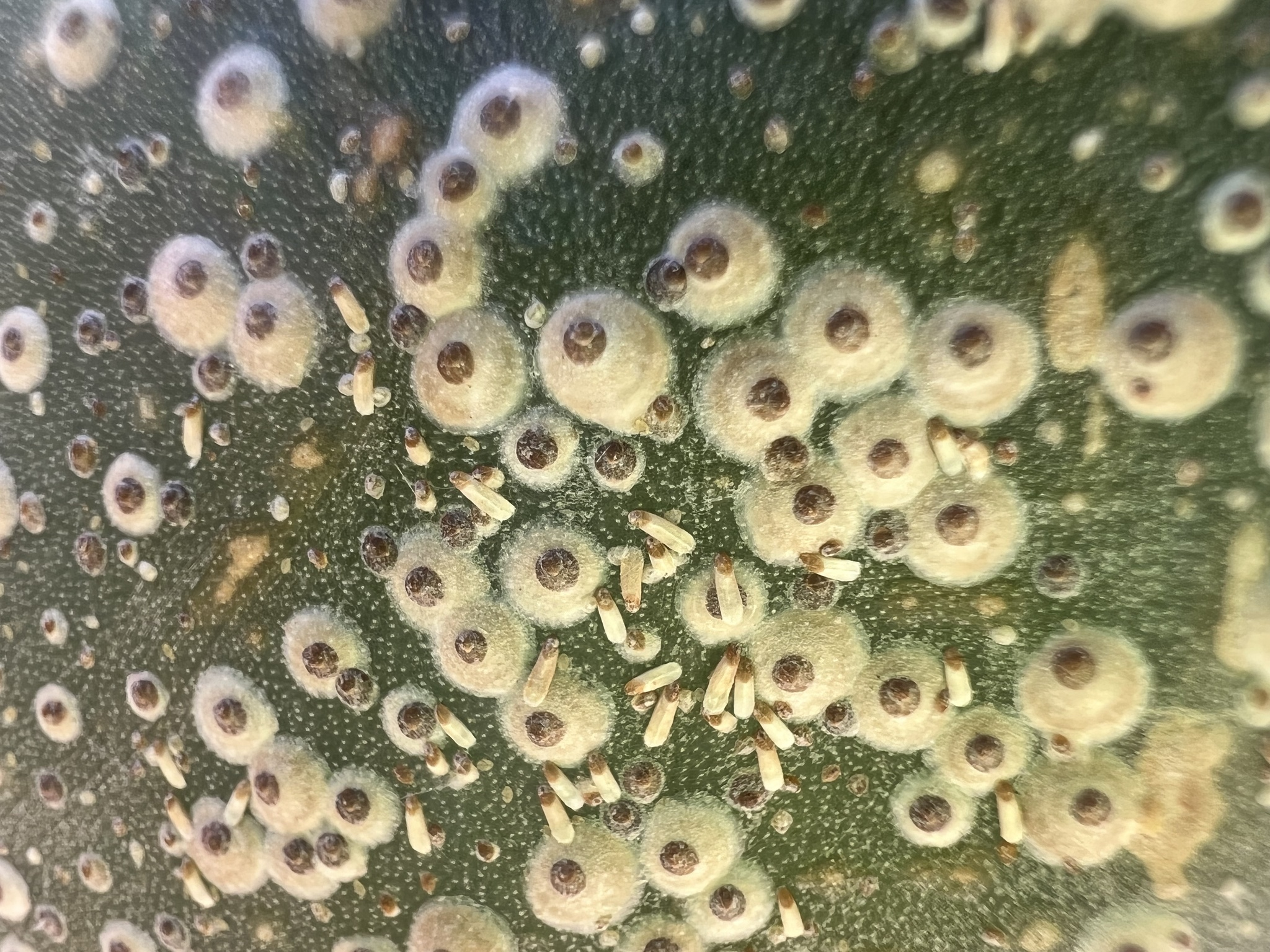
- Diaspis echinocacti, prickly pear scale, New Mexico

Scientific classification
- Kingdom: Animalia
- Phylum: Arthropoda
- Class: Insecta
- Order: Hemiptera
- Suborder: Sternorrhyncha
- Family: Diaspididae
- Subtribe: Diaspidina
- Genus: Diaspis; Costa, 1828

= Diaspis =

Genus of scale insects

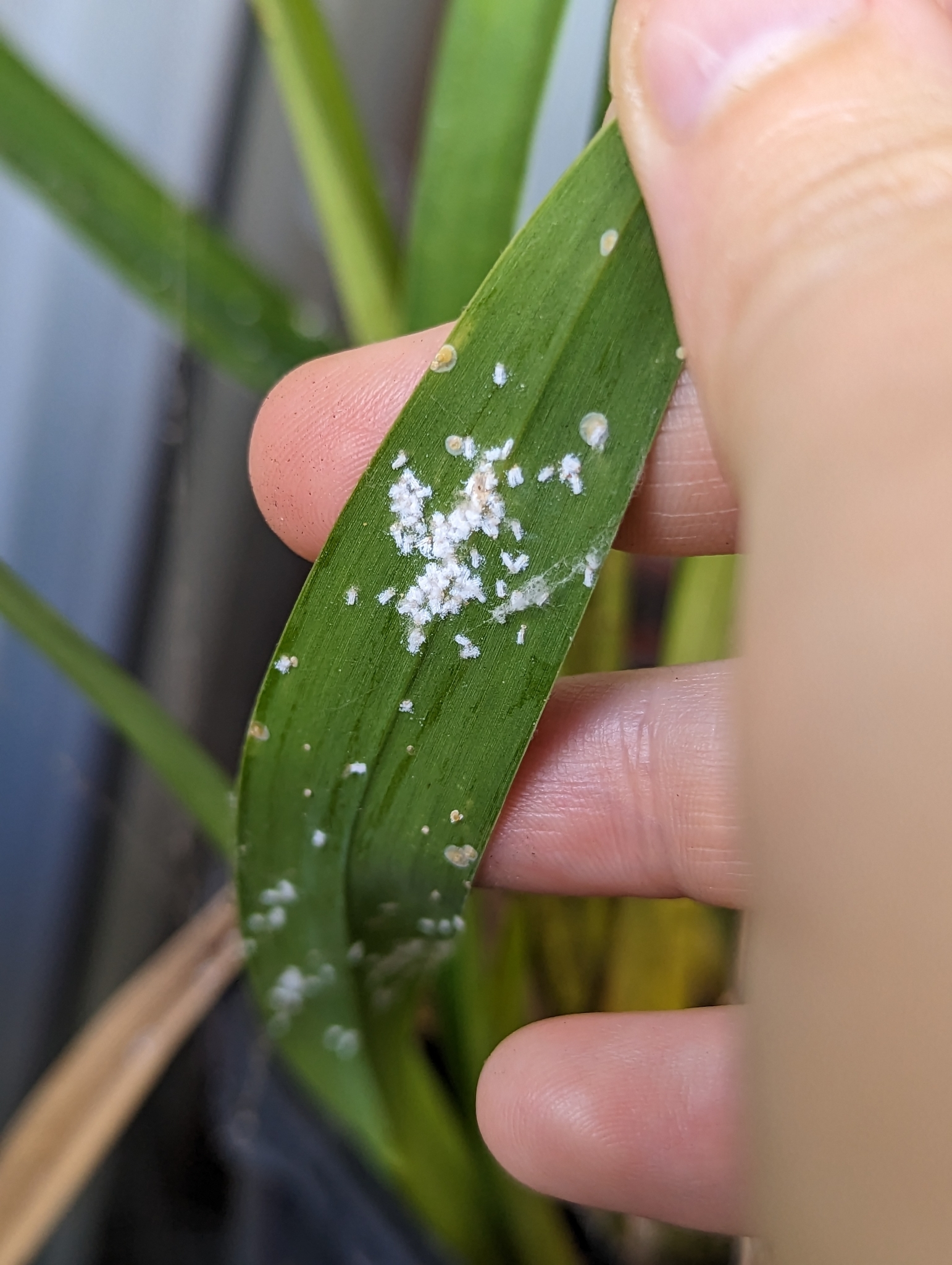
Diaspis boisduvalii, boisduval scale, Australia

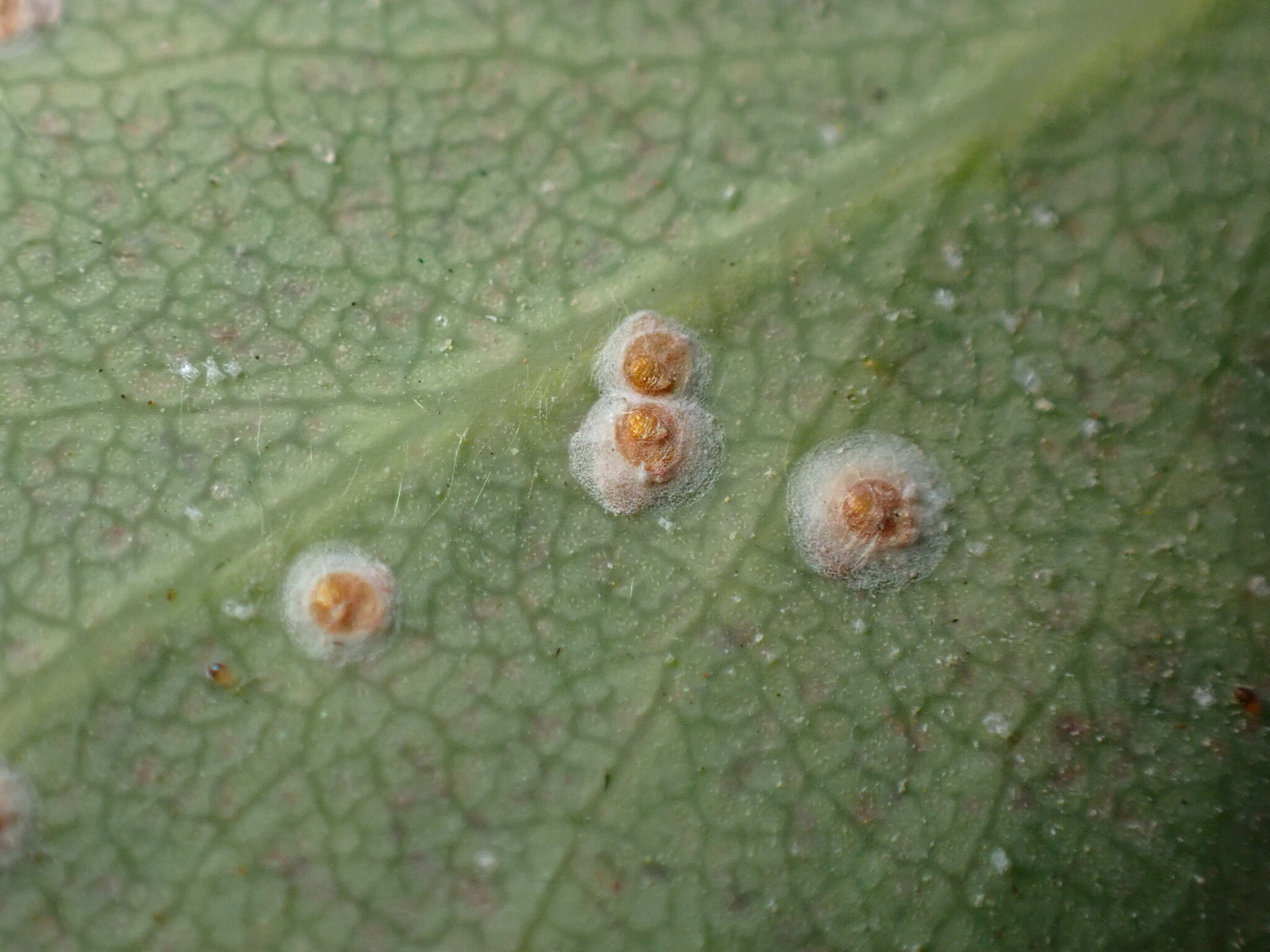
Diaspis manzanitae, Manzanita Scale, California

Diaspis is a genus in the armored scale insect family Diaspididae. There are more than 50 described species in Diaspis.

== Species ==
These 57 species belong to the genus Diaspis:

- Diaspis aequalis Munting, 1967
- Diaspis africana Lindinger, 1909
- Diaspis alba Fonseca, 1969
- Diaspis amantei Fonseca, 1973
- Diaspis antiquorum Green, 1922
- Diaspis arundinariae (Tippins & Howell, 1973)
- Diaspis barrancorum Lindinger, 1911
- Diaspis bicolor Laing, 1932
- Diaspis boisduvalii Signoret, 1869 (boisduval scale)
- Diaspis brevinatis Ferris, 1941
- Diaspis bromeliae (Kerner, 1778) (pineapple scale)
- Diaspis carissae Hall, 1928
- Diaspis carmanica Davatchi & Balachowsky, 1956
- Diaspis casuarinae Williams & Watson, 1988
- Diaspis chilensis Cockerell, 1895
- Diaspis coccois Lichtenstein, 1882 (cocos scale)
- Diaspis colvei Penzig, 1887
- Diaspis conocarpi McKenzie, 1947
- Diaspis cuneata Vernalha et al., 1965
- Diaspis delottoi Munting, 1967
- Diaspis diacanthi Rungs, 1942
- Diaspis digna Hoke, 1928
- Diaspis diospyri Ferris, 1937
- Diaspis echinocacti (Bouché, 1833) (prickly pear scale)
- Diaspis elaeidis Munting, 1969
- Diaspis ferrisi McKenzie, 1947
- Diaspis flava Hempel, 1919
- Diaspis fraxini Ferris, 1937
- Diaspis gilloglyi McKenzie, 1963 (Gillogly scale)
- Diaspis helveola Laing, 1932
- Diaspis hererina Munting, 1969
- Diaspis iodinae Boratynski, 1968
- Diaspis maculata Diaspis maculata (Cockerell, 1898)
- Diaspis manzanitae (Whitney, 1913) (manzanita scale)
- Diaspis mihiriya Green, 1922
- Diaspis minensis Hempel, 1918
- Diaspis miranda (Cockerell, 1898)
- Diaspis muntingii Fonseca, 1973
- Diaspis myristicae (Rutherford, 1914)
- Diaspis obliqua Costa, 1829
- Diaspis parasiti McKenzie, 1947 (mistletoe scale)
- Diaspis parva Lindinger, 1910
- Diaspis parvinatis Ferris, 1941
- Diaspis paulista Lepage, 1942
- Diaspis pelargonii Cockerell, 1892
- Diaspis portulacariae Williams, 1955
- Diaspis quercus Moghaddam, 2021
- Diaspis radicicola Ferris, 1937
- Diaspis refertinatis Ferris, 1941
- Diaspis simmondsiae Ferris, 1921 (jojoba scale)
- Diaspis stilosa Lindinger, 1909
- Diaspis subregularis Hall, 1929
- Diaspis syriaca Lindinger, 1912
- Diaspis texensis (Cockerell, 1896)
- Diaspis toumeyi Cockerell, 1895
- Diaspis townsendi Cockerell, 1899
- Diaspis uniglandulosa Balachowsky & Ferrero, 1967
