= Unaspis citri =

Scientific classification
- Domain: Eukaryota
- Kingdom: Animalia
- Phylum: Arthropoda
- Class: Insecta
- Order: Hemiptera
- Suborder: Sternorrhyncha
- Family: Diaspididae
- Genus: Unaspis
- Species: U. citri

Binomial name
- Unaspis citri (Comstock, 1883)

Species of true bug

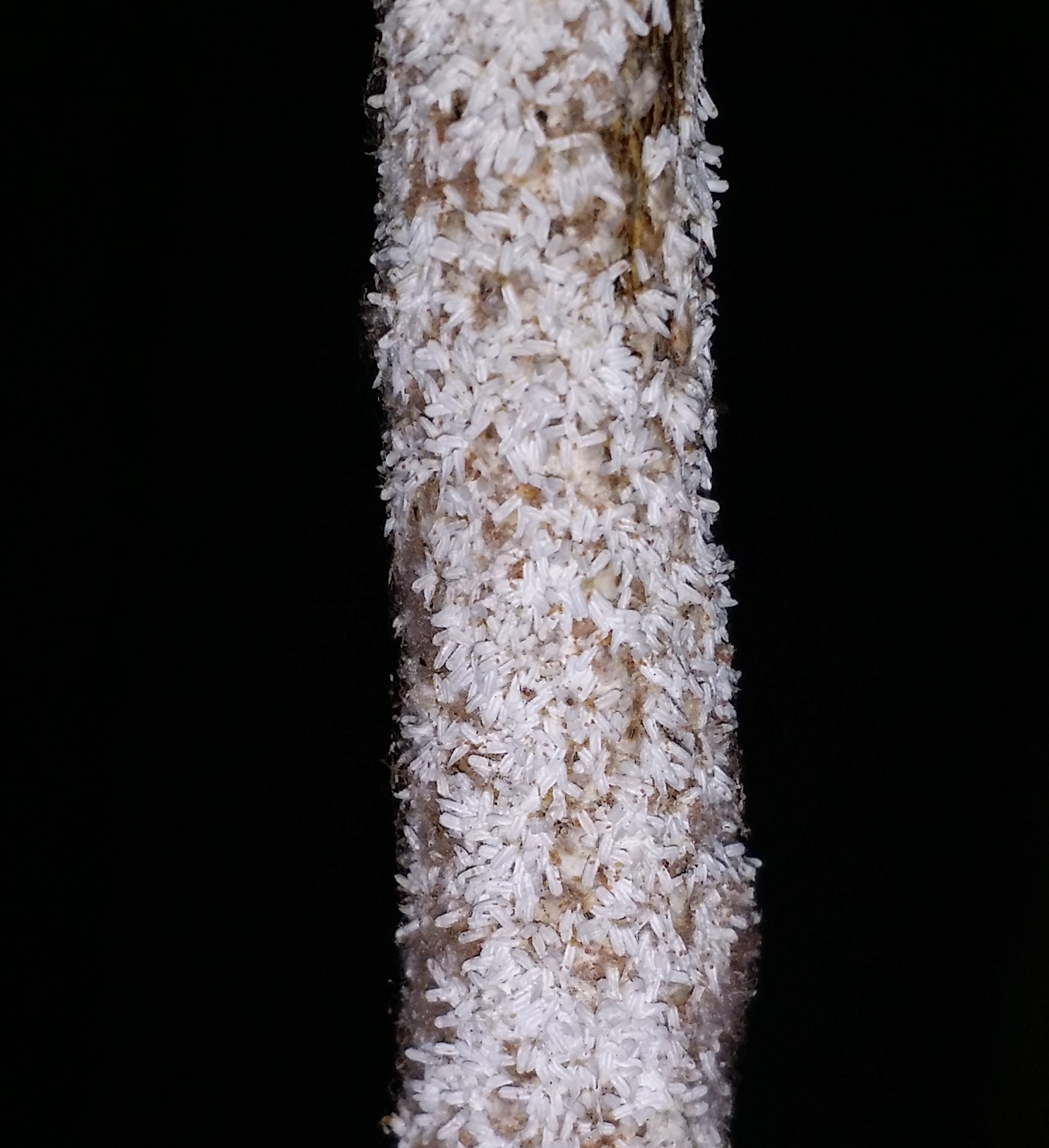

Unaspis citri, known generally as citrus snow scale, is a species of armored scale insect in the family Diaspididae. Other common names include the orange chionaspi, orange snow scale, white louse scale, and white snow scale.
