= Ischnaspis =

Scientific classification
- Domain: Eukaryota
- Kingdom: Animalia
- Phylum: Arthropoda
- Class: Insecta
- Order: Hemiptera
- Suborder: Sternorrhyncha
- Family: Diaspididae
- Subtribe: Lepidosaphidina
- Genus: Ischnaspis; Douglas, 1887

Genus of insects

Ischnaspis is a genus of armored scale insects in the family Diaspididae. There are about seven described species in Ischnaspis.

== Species ==
These seven species belong to the genus Ischnaspis:

- Ischnaspis ghesquierei Matile-Ferrero, 1982
- Ischnaspis longirostris (Signoret, 1882)
- Ischnaspis macrolobii Laing, 1932
- Ischnaspis remaudierei Matile-Ferrero, 1982
- Ischnaspis silvestrii Leonardi, 1914
- Ischnaspis spathulata Lindinger, 1911
- Ischnaspis tecleae Ben-Dov, 1974
