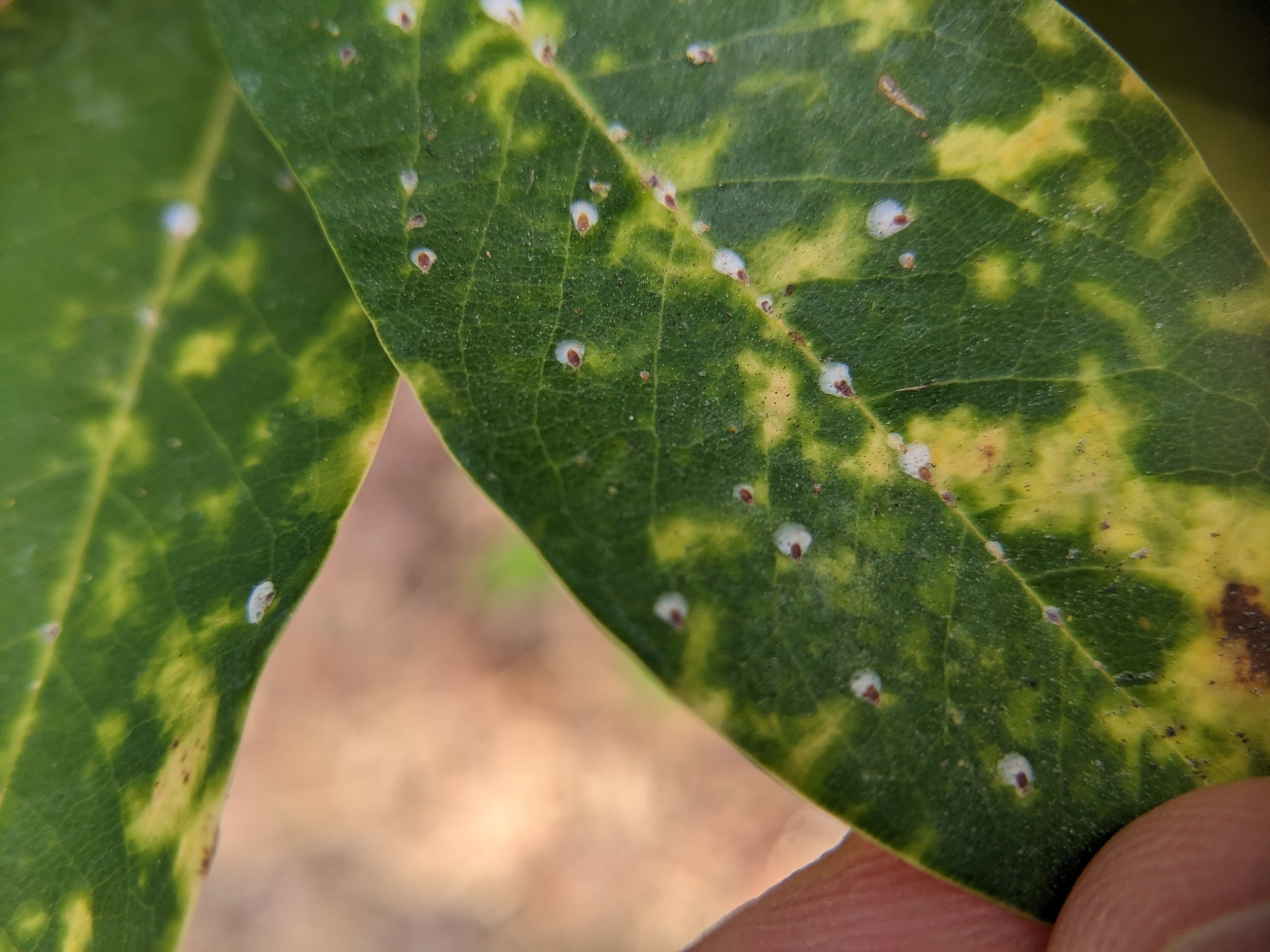
- on Sweetbay Magnolia

Scientific classification
- Domain: Eukaryota
- Kingdom: Animalia
- Phylum: Arthropoda
- Class: Insecta
- Order: Hemiptera
- Suborder: Sternorrhyncha
- Family: Diaspididae
- Genus: Pseudaulacaspis
- Species: P. cockerelli

Binomial name
- Pseudaulacaspis cockerelli (Cooley, 1897)

= Pseudaulacaspis cockerelli =

Species of true bug

Pseudaulacaspis cockerelli, known generally as false oleander scale, is a species of armored scale insect in the family Diaspididae. Other common names include the fullaway oleander scale, magnolia white scale, mango scale, oleander scale, and oyster scale. It is found in Europe.
