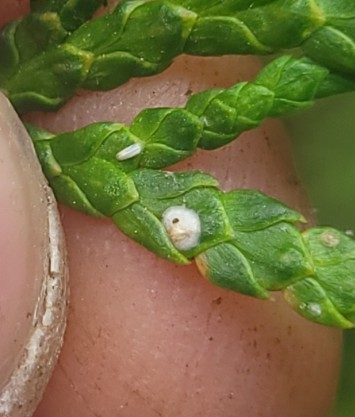
- Carulaspis female and immature male on Thuja occidentalis

Scientific classification
- Kingdom: Animalia
- Phylum: Arthropoda
- Clade: Pancrustacea
- Class: Insecta
- Order: Hemiptera
- Suborder: Sternorrhyncha
- Family: Diaspididae
- Subtribe: Diaspidina
- Genus: Carulaspis; MacGillivray, 1921

= Carulaspis =

Genus of insects

Carulaspis is a genus of true bugs belonging to the family Diaspididae.

The species of this genus are found in Europe.

Species:

- Carulaspis atlantica (Lindinger, 1911)
- Carulaspis juniperi (Bouché, 1851)
- Carulaspis minima (Signoret, 1869)
- Carulaspis silvestrii Lupo, 1966
- Carulaspis taxicola (Vayssière, 1913)
- Carulaspis visci (Schrank, 1781)
