= Ischnaspis longirostris =

Scientific classification
- Domain: Eukaryota
- Kingdom: Animalia
- Phylum: Arthropoda
- Class: Insecta
- Order: Hemiptera
- Suborder: Sternorrhyncha
- Family: Diaspididae
- Genus: Ischnaspis
- Species: I. longirostris

Binomial name
- Ischnaspis longirostris (Signoret, 1882)

Species of true bug

Ischnaspis longirostris is a species of armored scale insect in the family Diaspididae.
