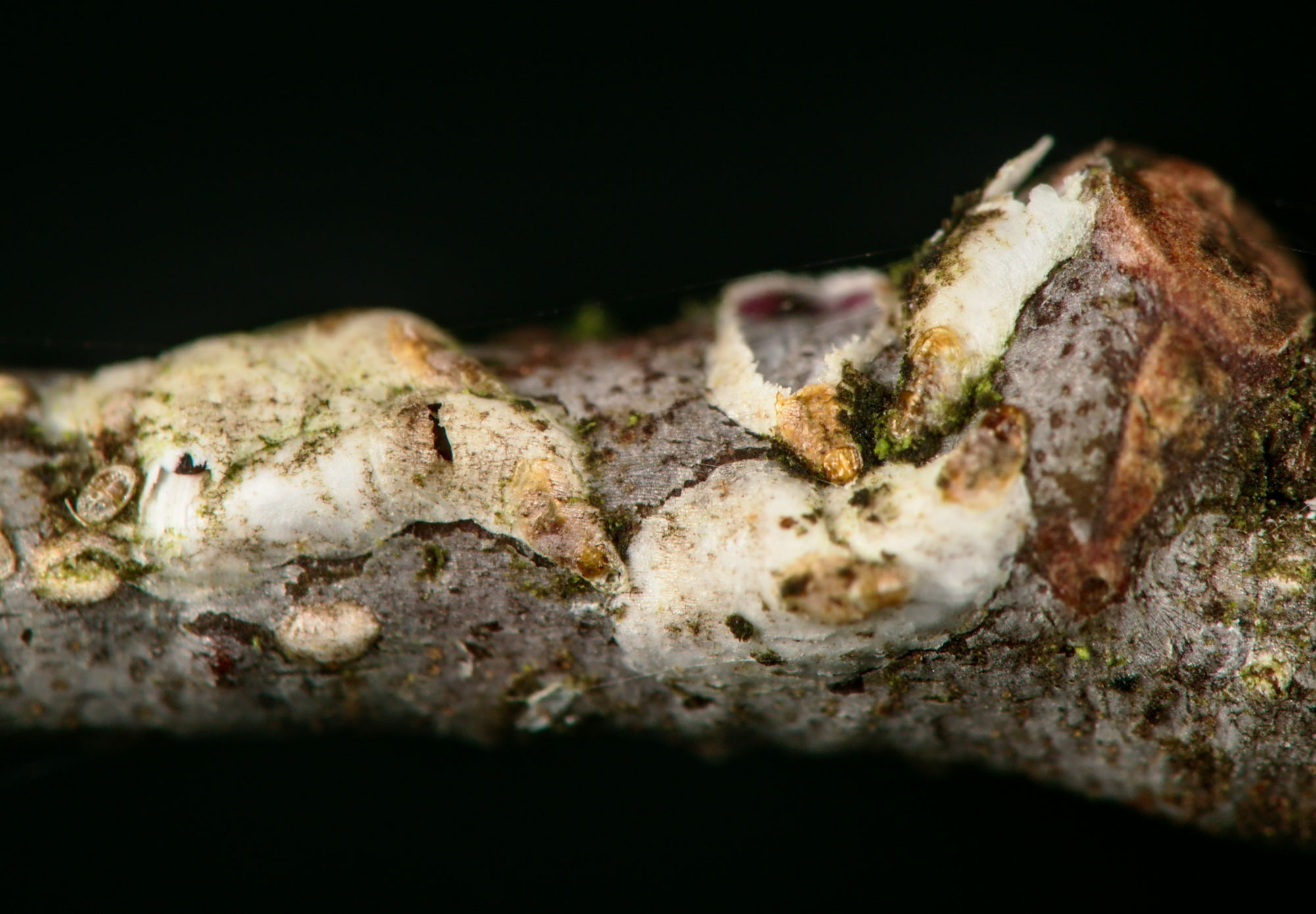
- Chionaspis salicis, willow scale, Belgium

Scientific classification
- Kingdom: Animalia
- Phylum: Arthropoda
- Class: Insecta
- Order: Hemiptera
- Suborder: Sternorrhyncha
- Superfamily: Coccoidea
- Family: Diaspididae
- Genus: Chionaspis; Signoret, 1869

= Chionaspis =

Genus of true bugs

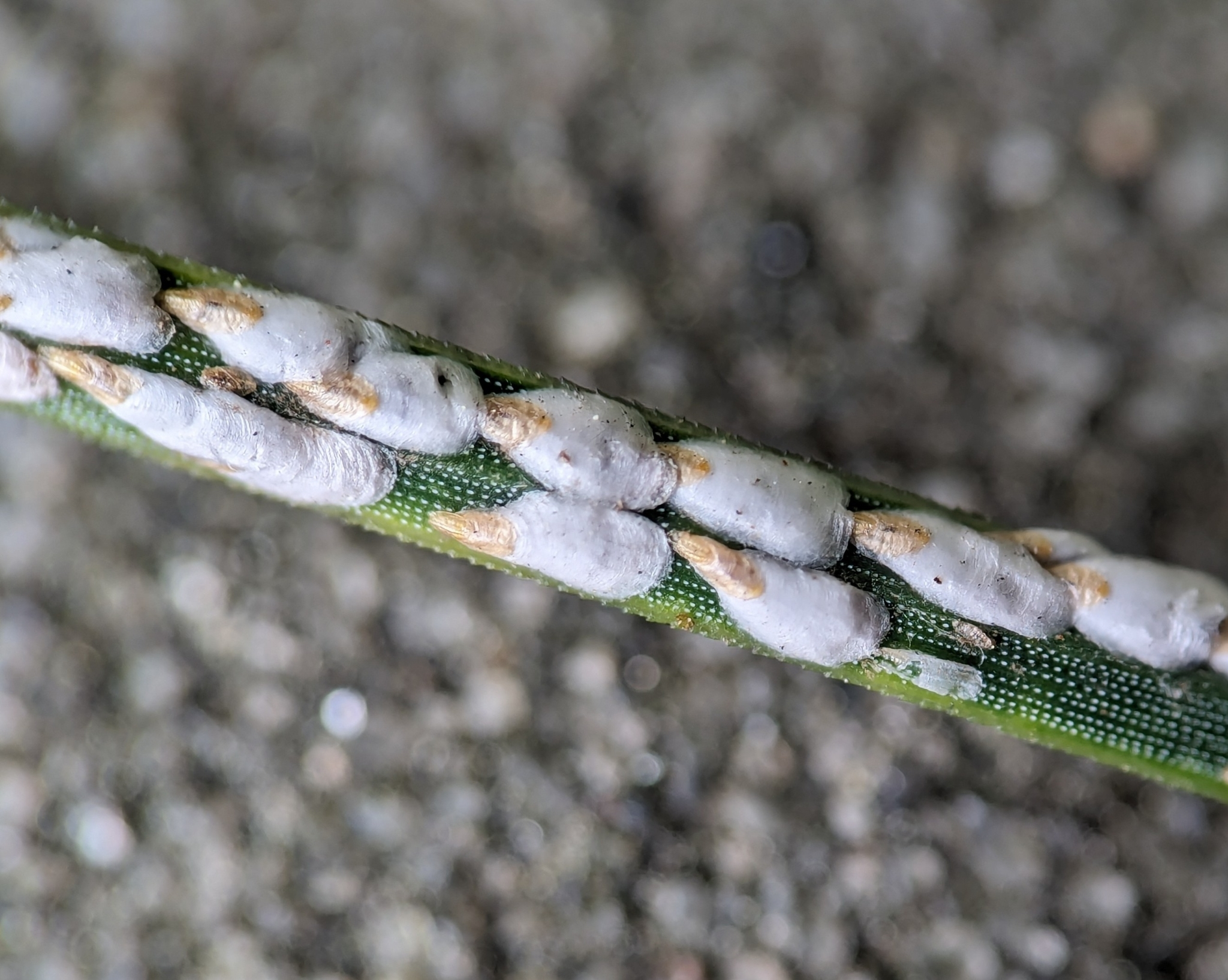
Chionaspis pinifoliae, pine needle scale, New York

Chionaspis is a genus of scale insect. In 2011 geographical sampling and analysis indicated a number of unnamed species in the genus Chionaspis.

== Species ==
The following species are members of the genus Chionaspis:

- Chionaspis acer (Takagi & Kawai, 1966)
- Chionaspis acericola Hollinger, 1923
- Chionaspis acuta Danzig, 1936
- Chionaspis agonis Fuller, 1897
- Chionaspis agranulata Chen, 1983
- Chionaspis alnus Kuwana, 1928 (Japanese alder scale)
- Chionaspis americana Johnson, 1896 (elm scurfy scale)
- Chionaspis angusta Green, 1904
- Chionaspis arkhola Takagi, 1985
- Chionaspis austriaca Lindinger, 1912 (Austrian pine scale)
- Chionaspis brachycephalon Vea, 2013
- Chionaspis broughae Williams & Watson, 1988
- Chionaspis cacti Kuwana & Muramatsu, 1931
- Chionaspis camphora (Chen, 1983)
- Chionaspis candida Green, 1905
- Chionaspis caryae Cooley, 1898
- Chionaspis castanopsidis Takagi, 1985
- Chionaspis caudata Vea, 2013
- Chionaspis cinnamomicola (Takahashi, 1935)
- Chionaspis clematidis Takagi, 1985
- Chionaspis comys William & Watson, 1988
- Chionaspis corni Cooley, 1899 (dogwood scale)
- Chionaspis cornigera Takagi, 1985
- Chionaspis discadentata Danzig, 1976
- Chionaspis dryina (Ferris, 1953)
- Chionaspis ethelae Fuller, 1897
- Chionaspis etrusca Leonardi, 1908 (tamarix scale)
- Chionaspis floridensis Takagi, 1969 (Florida scurfy scale)
- Chionaspis formosa Green, 1904
- Chionaspis frenchi Green, 1915
- Chionaspis furfura (Fitch, 1857) (scurfy scale)
- Chionaspis gengmaensis (Chen, 1983)
- Chionaspis gilli Liu & Kosztarab, 1987
- Chionaspis gleditsiae Sanders, 1903 (honey locust chionaspis)
- Chionaspis glutae Takagi, 2019
- Chionaspis hamoni Liu & Kosztarab, 1987
- Chionaspis heterophyllae Cooley, 1897
- Chionaspis himalaica Takagi, 1985
- Chionaspis kabyliensis Balachowsky, 1930
- Chionaspis keravatana Williams & Watson, 1988
- Chionaspis keteleeriae (Ferris, 1953)
- Chionaspis kinabaluana Takagi, 2019
- Chionaspis kosztarabi Takagi and Kawai, 1967 (ash scurfy scale)
- Chionaspis linderae Takahashi, 1952
- Chionaspis lintneri Comstock, 1883 (lintner scurfy scale)
- Chionaspis lithocarpi Takahashi, 1942
- Chionaspis lithocarpicola Takahashi, 1942
- Chionaspis lithocarporum Takagi, 2019
- Chionaspis longiloba Cooley, 1889
- Chionaspis lutea Newstead, 1911
- Chionaspis megazygosis Chen, 1983
- Chionaspis melastomatis Takagi, 2019
- Chionaspis montanoides Tang, 1986
- Chionaspis nyssae Comstock, 1881 (sorghum scale)
- Chionaspis obclavata Chen, 1983
- Chionaspis oligocera Takagi, 2019
- Chionaspis ortholobis Comstock, 1881
- Chionaspis osmanthi (Ferris, 1953)
- Chionaspis pinifoliae (Fitch, 1856) (pine needle scale)
- Chionaspis platani Cooley, 1889
- Chionaspis pogonantherae Takagi, 2019
- Chionaspis pusa Rao, 1953
- Chionaspis quercea Takagi, 2019
- Chionaspis rhombifera Takagi, 2019
- Chionaspis rhombiphora Takagi, 2019
- Chionaspis rotunda (Takahashi, 1935)
- Chionaspis saitamaensis Kuwana, 1928
- Chionaspis salicis (Linnaeus, 1758) (willow scale)
- Chionaspis samatana Takagi, 2019
- Chionaspis sassceri Cockerell & Robbins, 1909
- Chionaspis sivapuriana Takagi, 1985
- Chionaspis sonorae Vea, 2013
- Chionaspis sozanica Takahashi, 1933
- Chionaspis sterculiae Laing, 1932
- Chionaspis styracis Liu & Kosztarab, 1989
- Chionaspis subrotunda (Chen, 1983)
- Chionaspis tangana (Lindinger, 1910)
- Chionaspis torreyanae Vea, 2013
- Chionaspis triformis Tippins & Beshear, 1974 (birch scurfy scale)
- Chionaspis trigonobalani Takagi, 2019
- Chionaspis trochodendri (Takahashi, 1936)
- Chionaspis wistariae Cooley, 1897
- Chionaspis yanagicola (Kuwana & Muramatsu, 1932)
