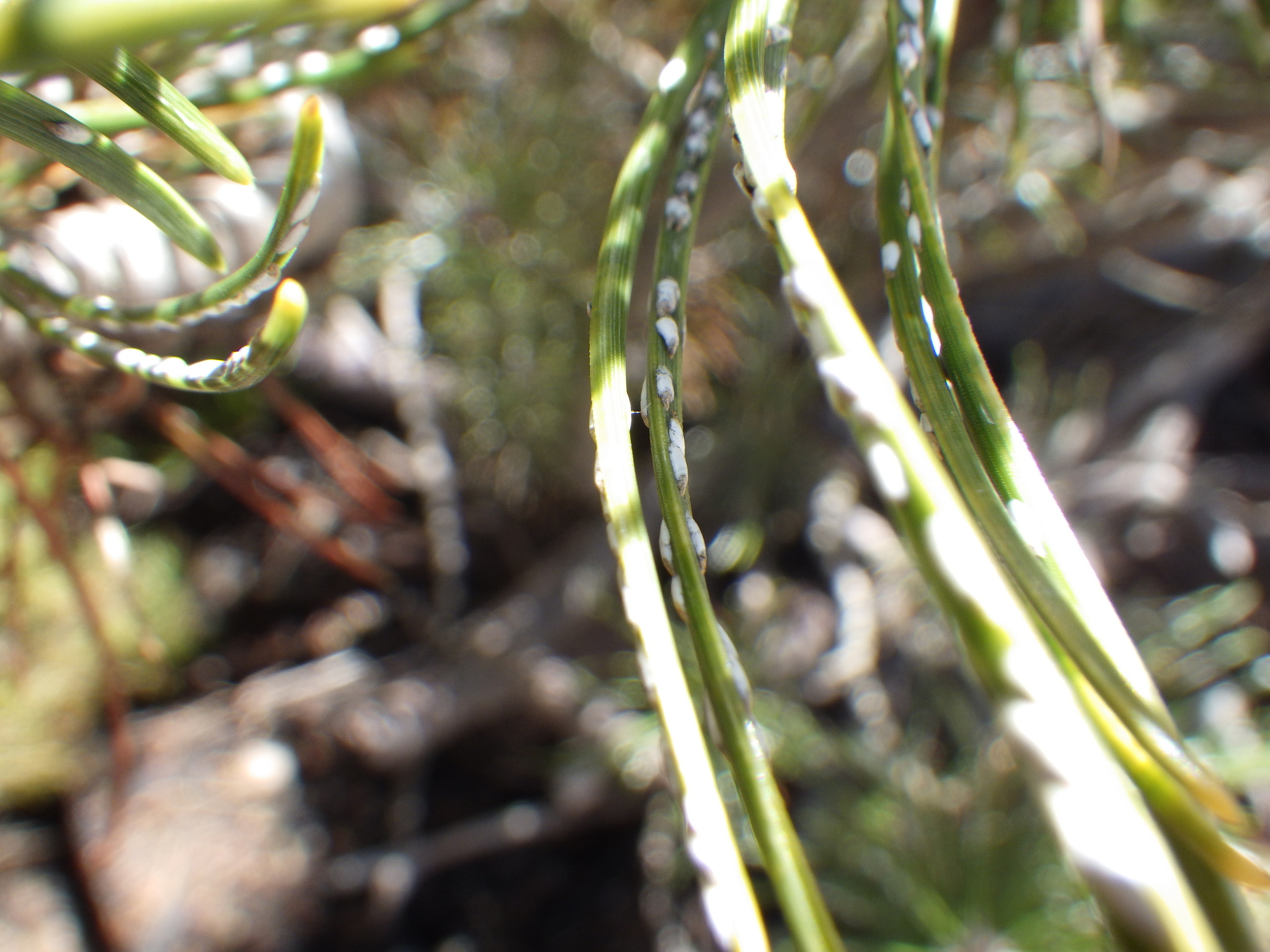

Scientific classification
- Kingdom: Animalia
- Phylum: Arthropoda
- Class: Insecta
- Order: Hemiptera
- Suborder: Sternorrhyncha
- Family: Diaspididae
- Genus: Chionaspis
- Species: C. pinifoliae

Binomial name
- Chionaspis pinifoliae Fitch, 1856

= Chionaspis pinifoliae =

Species of true bug

Chionaspis pinifoliae, the pine needle scale insect, is a common species of scale insect found on pine, spruce and other conifers across Canada and throughout the United States. The species is particularly persistent on planted spruce in the Prairie Provinces in both rural and urban settings. In heavy populations, the needles may appear to be flecked with white. The insect overwinters in the egg stage under the white covering of the scale. In Saskatchewan, hatching dates vary from late May to late June. In the Mid-Atlantic region of the United States there can be one or two generations per year and the first generation hatches after an average of 210 growing degree-days. The newly hatched “crawlers” disperse, settle on old or new needles and begin scale development.
