= Unaspis =

Scientific classification
- Domain: Eukaryota
- Kingdom: Animalia
- Phylum: Arthropoda
- Class: Insecta
- Order: Hemiptera
- Suborder: Sternorrhyncha
- Family: Diaspididae
- Subtribe: Chionaspidina
- Genus: Unaspis

Genus of true bugs

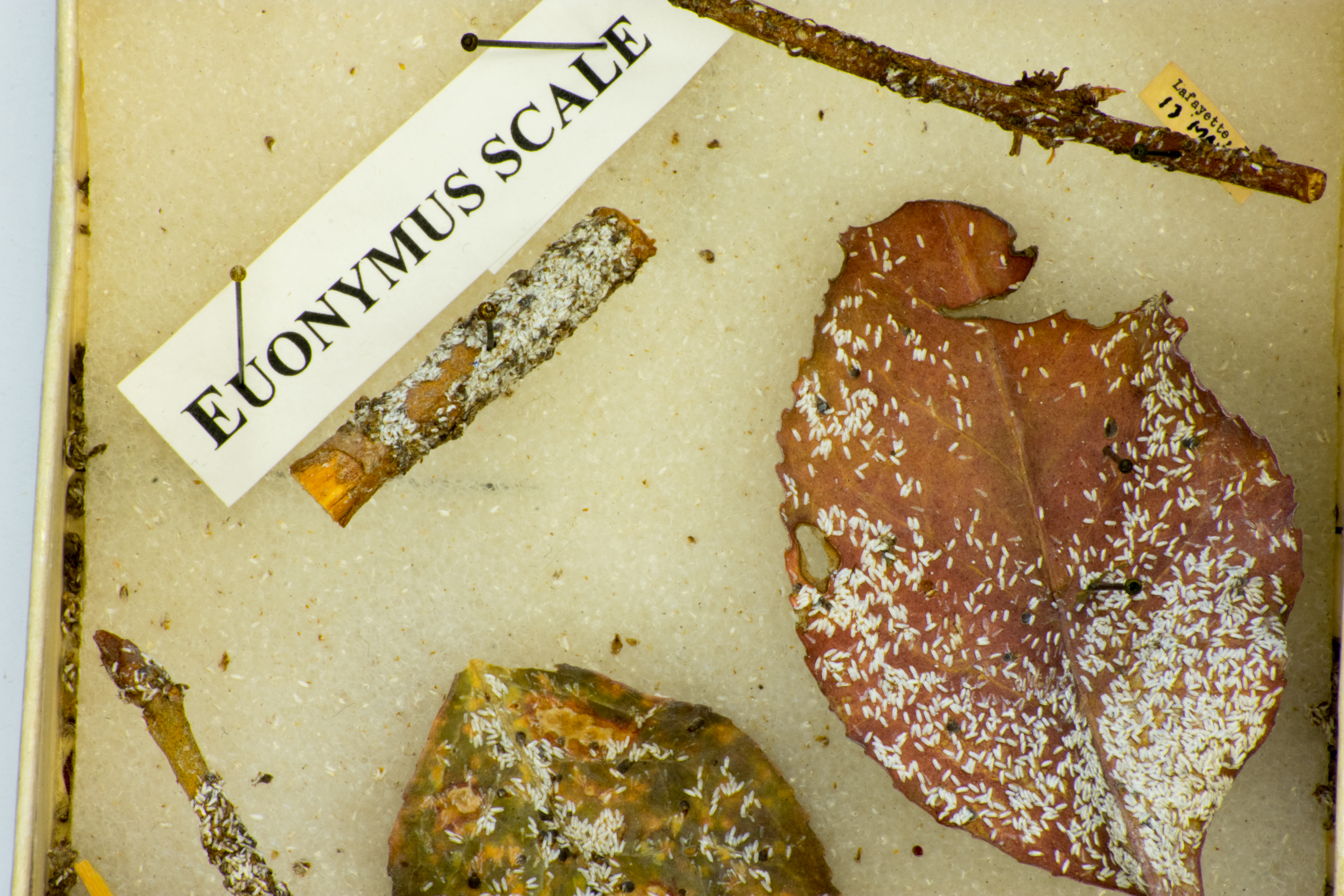
Unaspis can infest the leaves of plants in the genus Euonymus

Unaspis is a genus of armored scale insects in the family Diaspididae. There are at least two described species in Unaspis.

== Species ==
- Unaspis citri (Comstock, 1883) (citrus snow scale)
- Unaspis euonymi (Comstock, 1881) (euonymus scale)
