= Diaspidina =

Scientific classification
- Domain: Eukaryota
- Kingdom: Animalia
- Phylum: Arthropoda
- Class: Insecta
- Order: Hemiptera
- Suborder: Sternorrhyncha
- Family: Diaspididae
- Tribe: Diaspidini
- Subtribe: Diaspidina

Subtribe of true bugs

Diaspidina is a subtribe of armored scale insects. It occurs mostly in the Americas and Africa, with a few species in tropical Asia. In the Americas Pseudoparlatoria is the largest genus, with Diaspis second; in Africa Diaspis is the largest genus. The grouping identified by Balachowsky in 1954 as the subtribe Diaspidina, are now the tribe Diaspidini.

Anderson found the Diaspidina grouping to constitute a clade with core genera: Carulaspis, Diaspis and Epidiaspis. and one of three sister-clades in the Diaspidini, the other two being the Chionaspidina and the Fioriniina.

== Genera ==
The following genera are members of the subtribe Diaspidina.

- Bantudiaspis Hall, 1928
- Carulaspis MacGillivray, 1921
- Chilesaphes González, 2015
- Credodiaspis MacGillivray, 1921
- Cryptodiaspis Lindinger, 1909
- Diaspis Costa, 1828
- Diaulacaspis Takahashi, 1942
- Epidiaspis Cockerell, 1899
- Incisaspis MacGillivray, 1921
- Leptodiaspis Takagi, 2011
- Pseudodiaspis Cockerell, 1897
- Thysanofiorinia Balachowsky, 1954
- Umbaspis MacGillivray, 1921

== See also ==
- Chionaspidina
- Fioriniina
- Protodiaspidina
