= Diaspis bromeliae =

Scientific classification
- Domain: Eukaryota
- Kingdom: Animalia
- Phylum: Arthropoda
- Class: Insecta
- Order: Hemiptera
- Suborder: Sternorrhyncha
- Family: Diaspididae
- Genus: Diaspis
- Species: D. bromeliae

Binomial name
- Diaspis bromeliae (Kerner, 1778)

Species of true bug

Diaspis bromeliae is a species of armored scale insect in the family Diaspididae.
