= Antakaspidini =

Scientific classification
- Kingdom: Animalia
- Phylum: Arthropoda
- Class: Insecta
- Order: Hemiptera
- Suborder: Sternorrhyncha
- Family: Diaspididae
- Subfamily: Diaspidinae
- Tribe: Antakaspidini

Tribe of true bugs

Antakaspidini is a tribe of armored scale insects.

== Genera ==
- Antakaspis
