= Pinnaspis strachani =

Scientific classification
- Domain: Eukaryota
- Kingdom: Animalia
- Phylum: Arthropoda
- Class: Insecta
- Order: Hemiptera
- Suborder: Sternorrhyncha
- Family: Diaspididae
- Genus: Pinnaspis
- Species: P. strachani

Binomial name
- Pinnaspis strachani (Cooley, 1899)

Species of true bug

Pinnaspis strachani is a species of armored scale insect in the family Diaspididae.
