= Carulaspis juniperi =

Scientific classification
- Domain: Eukaryota
- Kingdom: Animalia
- Phylum: Arthropoda
- Class: Insecta
- Order: Hemiptera
- Suborder: Sternorrhyncha
- Family: Diaspididae
- Genus: Carulaspis
- Species: C. juniperi

Binomial name
- Carulaspis juniperi (Bouché, 1851)

Species of insect

Carulaspis juniperi, the juniper scale, is species of scale insect native to Europe which is an invasive pest in the United States.
