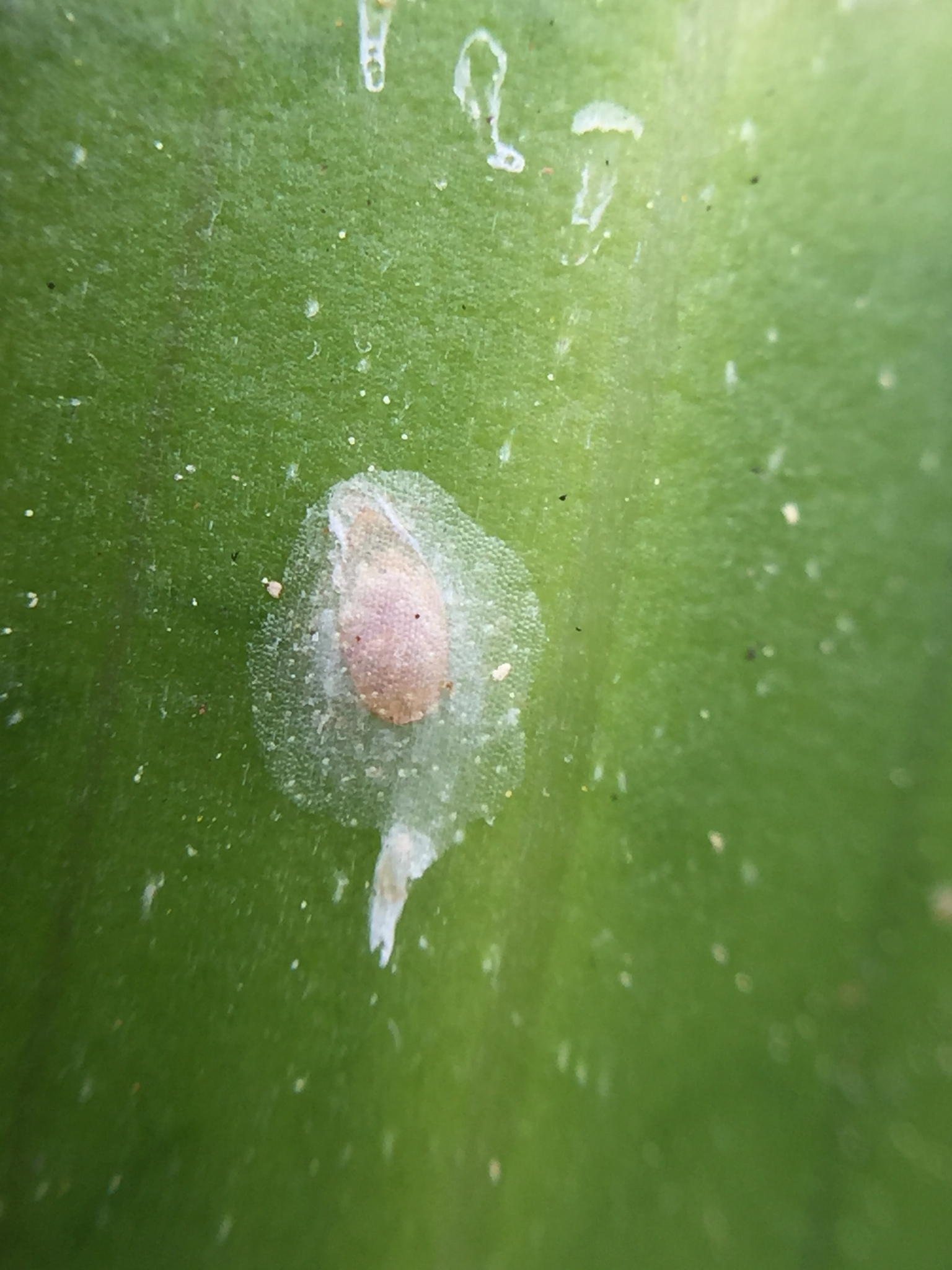
- Pellucidaspis epiphytidis, New Zealand

Scientific classification
- Domain: Eukaryota
- Kingdom: Animalia
- Phylum: Arthropoda
- Class: Insecta
- Order: Hemiptera
- Suborder: Sternorrhyncha
- Family: Diaspididae
- Subfamily: Ancepaspidinae

= Ancepaspidinae =

Subfamily of scale insects

Ancepaspidinae is a subfamily of armored scale insects in the family Diaspididae. They are found mainly in the New World, although the insects are highly invasive and occur elsewhere.

== Genera ==
- Ancepaspis Ferris, 1920
- Anotaspis Ferris, 1941
- Costalimaspis Lepage, 1937
- Fissuraspis Ferris, 1937
- Nicholiella Ferris, 1941
- Pelliculaspis Ferris, 1941
