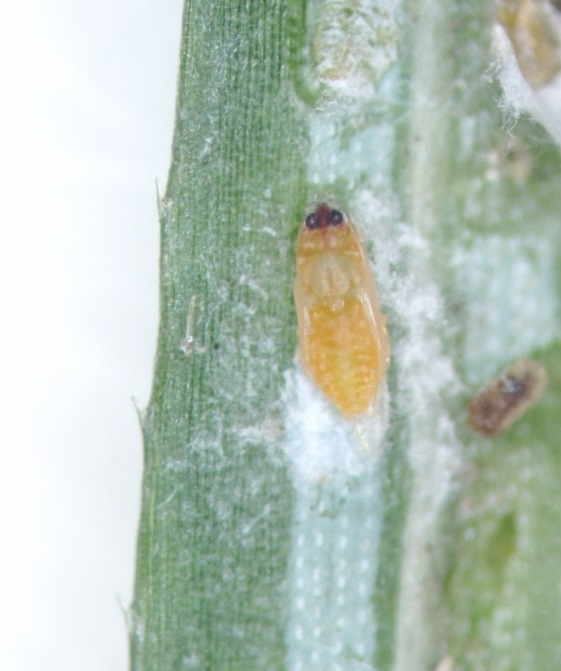
- Fiorinia externa, Pennsylvania

Scientific classification
- Domain: Eukaryota
- Kingdom: Animalia
- Phylum: Arthropoda
- Class: Insecta
- Order: Hemiptera
- Suborder: Sternorrhyncha
- Family: Diaspididae
- Subfamily: Diaspidinae
- Tribe: Diaspidini
- Subtribe: Fioriniina; Leonardi

Synonyms
- Kuwanaspidina Borchsenius

= Fioriniina =

Subtribe of scale insects

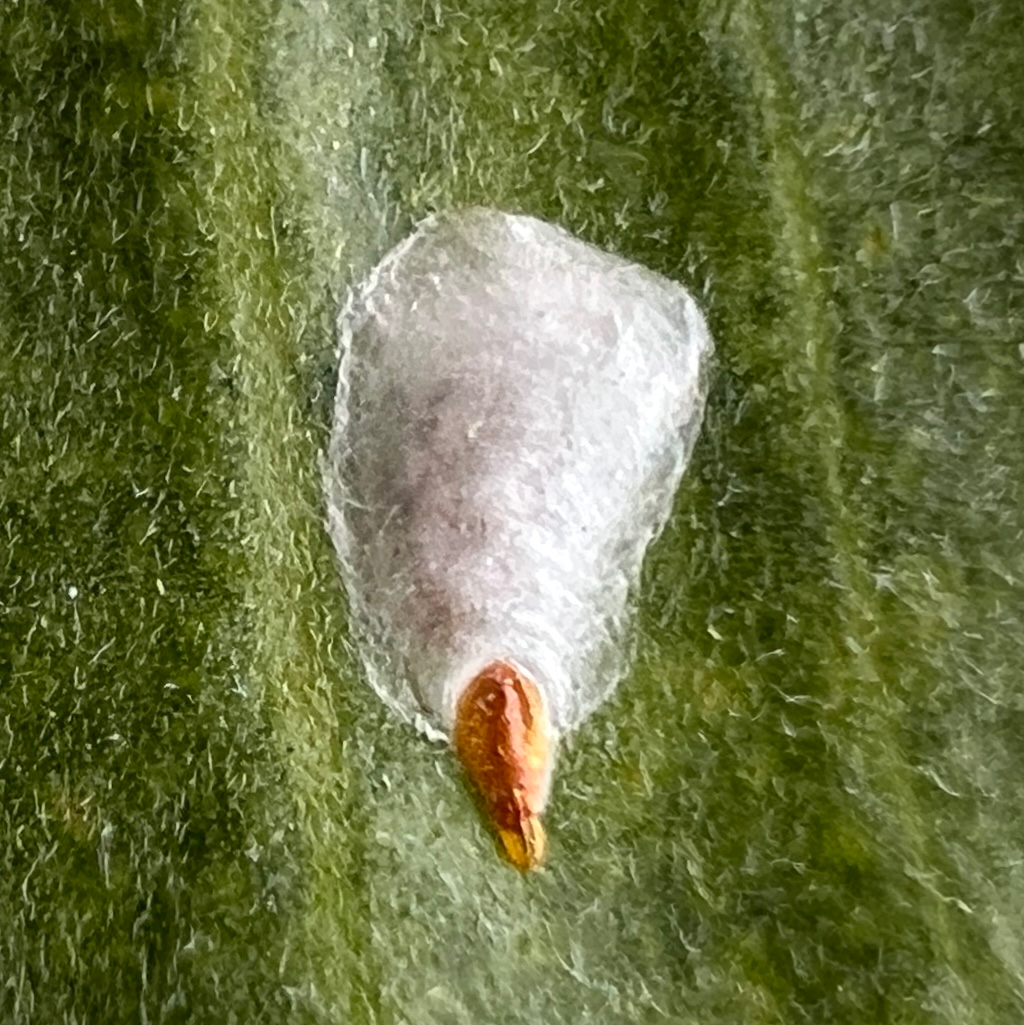
Fioriniina, Australia

Fioriniina is a subtribe of armored scale insects in the family Diaspididae. They are found almost exclusively in the Old World.

== Genera ==
The following genera are members of the subtribe Fioriniina.

- Achionaspis Takagi, 1970
- Adiscofiorinia Leonardi, 1906
- Africaspis MacGillivray, 1921
- Albastaspis MacGillivray, 1921
- Anzaspis Henderson, 2011
- Asymetraspis MacGillivray, 1921
- Augulaspis MacGillivray, 1921
- Bayokaspis Takagi, 2003
- Chimania Munting, 1970
- Chlidaspis Borchsenius, 1949
- Collubia Munting, 1968
- Contigaspis MacGillivray, 1921
- Cooleyaspis MacGillivray, 1921
- Coronaspis MacGillivray, 1921
- Crockeraspis Takagi, 2000
- Dentachionaspis MacGillivray, 1921
- Epifiorinia Takagi, 1970
- Finaspis Hall, 1929
- Fiorinia Targioni Tozzetti, 1868
- Formosaspis Takahashi, 1932
- Fraseraspis Takagi, 1999
- Fusilaspis MacGillivray, 1921
- Getulaspis Balachowsky, 1954
- Heimaspis Balachowsky & Ferrero, 1967
- Himalaspis Takagi, 2007
- Hyparrheniaspis Ghabbour & Hamon, 1998
- Inchoaspis MacGillivray, 1921
- Ischnafiorinia MacGillivray, 1921
- Keralaspis Takagi, 2007
- Kulatinganaspis Takagi, 2003
- Kuwanaspis MacGillivray, 1921
- Laingaspis Borchsenius & Williams, 1963
- Ledaspis Hall, 1946
- Lineaspis MacGillivray, 1921
- Magnospinus Munting, 1970
- Mammata Munting, 1969
- Mayonia Takagi, 2003
- Medangaspis Takagi, 1999
- Moraspis Hall, 1946
- Multispinaspis Munting, 1969
- Namibia Munting, 1969
- Nanhaiaspis Takagi & Martin, 2010
- Nikkoaspis Kuwana, 1928
- Nudachaspis MacGillivray, 1921
- Parachionaspis MacGillivray, 1921
- Pellucidaspis Henderson, 2011
- Poliaspis Maskell, 1880
- Protancepaspis Borchsenius & Bustshik, 1959
- Pseudaulacaspis MacGillivray, 1921
- Relhaniaspis Munting, 1970
- Rolaspis Hall, 1946
- Rutherfordia MacGillivray, 1921
- Salaspis Hall, 1946
- Sclopetaspis MacGillivray, 1921
- Singapuraspis Takagi, 2003
- Sinistraspis MacGillivray, 1921
- Tecaspis Hall, 1946
- Tenuiaspis MacGillivray, 1921
- Trichomytilus Leonardi, 1898
- Tsimbazaspis Mamet, 1962
- Unachionaspis MacGillivray, 1921
- Voraspis Hall, 1946
- Xiphuraspis Borchsenius & Williams, 1963
- Yomaspis Munting, 1968
