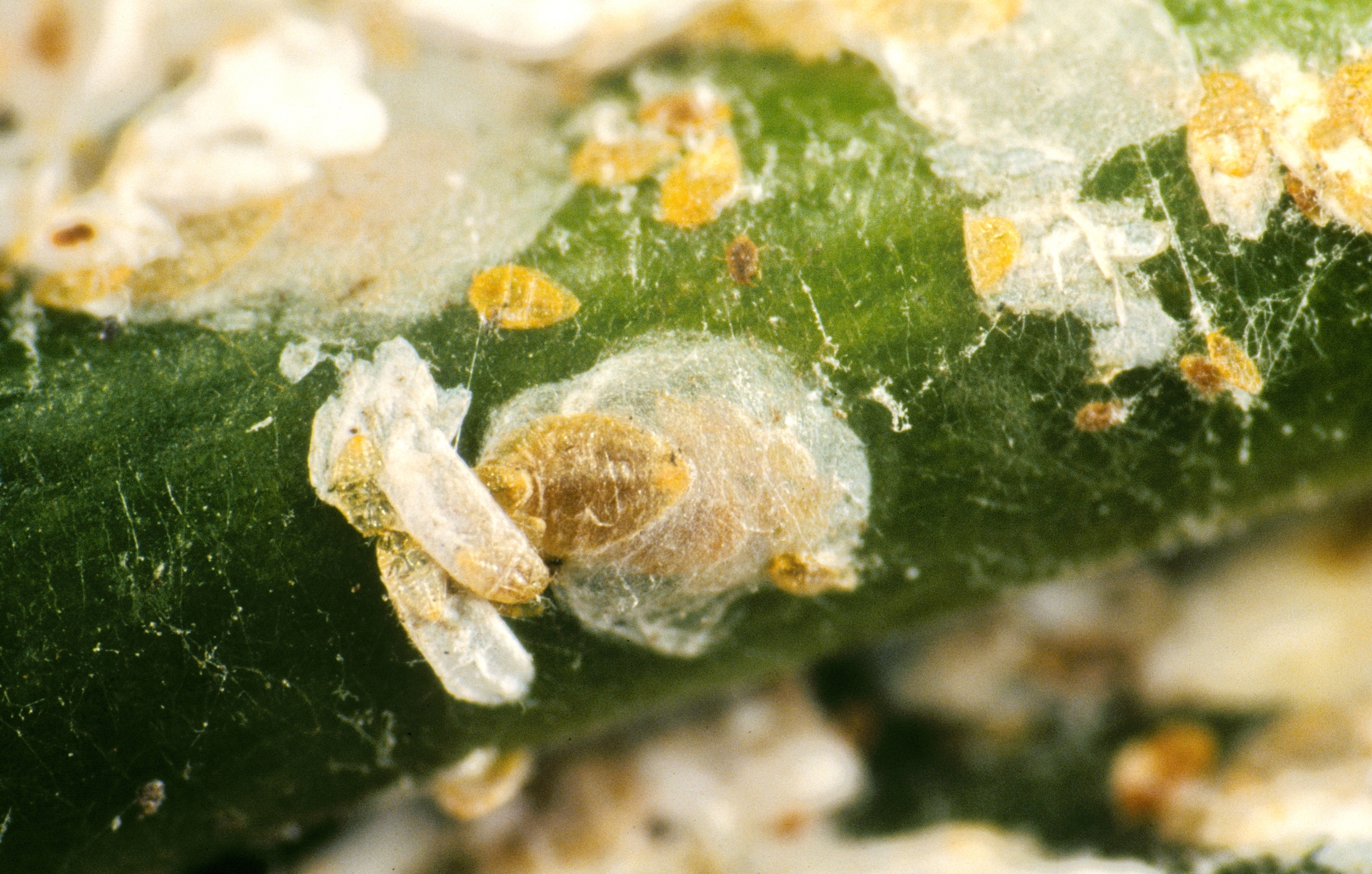
- Aulacaspis yasumatsui the cycad aulacaspis scale

Scientific classification
- Domain: Eukaryota
- Kingdom: Animalia
- Phylum: Arthropoda
- Class: Insecta
- Order: Hemiptera
- Suborder: Sternorrhyncha
- Family: Diaspididae
- Subfamily: Diaspidinae
- Tribe: Diaspidini

= Diaspidini =

Tribe of true bugs

Diaspidini is a tribe in the armored scale insect family Diaspididae. The insects are highly invasive, and are significant economic pests found worldwide.

Diaspidini contains three subtribes:

- Chionaspidina (cosmopolitan except South America, 48 genera)
- Diaspidina (cosmopolitan except Australasia, 13 genera)
- Fioriniina (almost exclusively Old World, 64 genera)

In addition, the following genera are classified as members of Diaspidini with uncertain placement to subtribe (incertae sedis):

- Furchadaspis MacGillivray 1921
- Gadaspis Borchsenius 1949
- Ischnaspis Douglas 1887
- Nimbaspis Balachowsky 1952
- Prodiaspis Young 1984
- Pygalataspis Ferris 1921
- Roureaspis Takagi 1997
- Trischnaspis Ben-Dov 1974

Six additional subtribes have been recognized in the past. According to research published in 2019,

- Protodiaspidina and Phenacaspidina are now included in Chionaspidina.
- Augulaspidina and Kuwanaspidina are now included in Fioriniina.
- The species formerly in Sclopetaspidina and Xerophilaspidina have been classified in various subtribes, tribes, and subfamilies.
