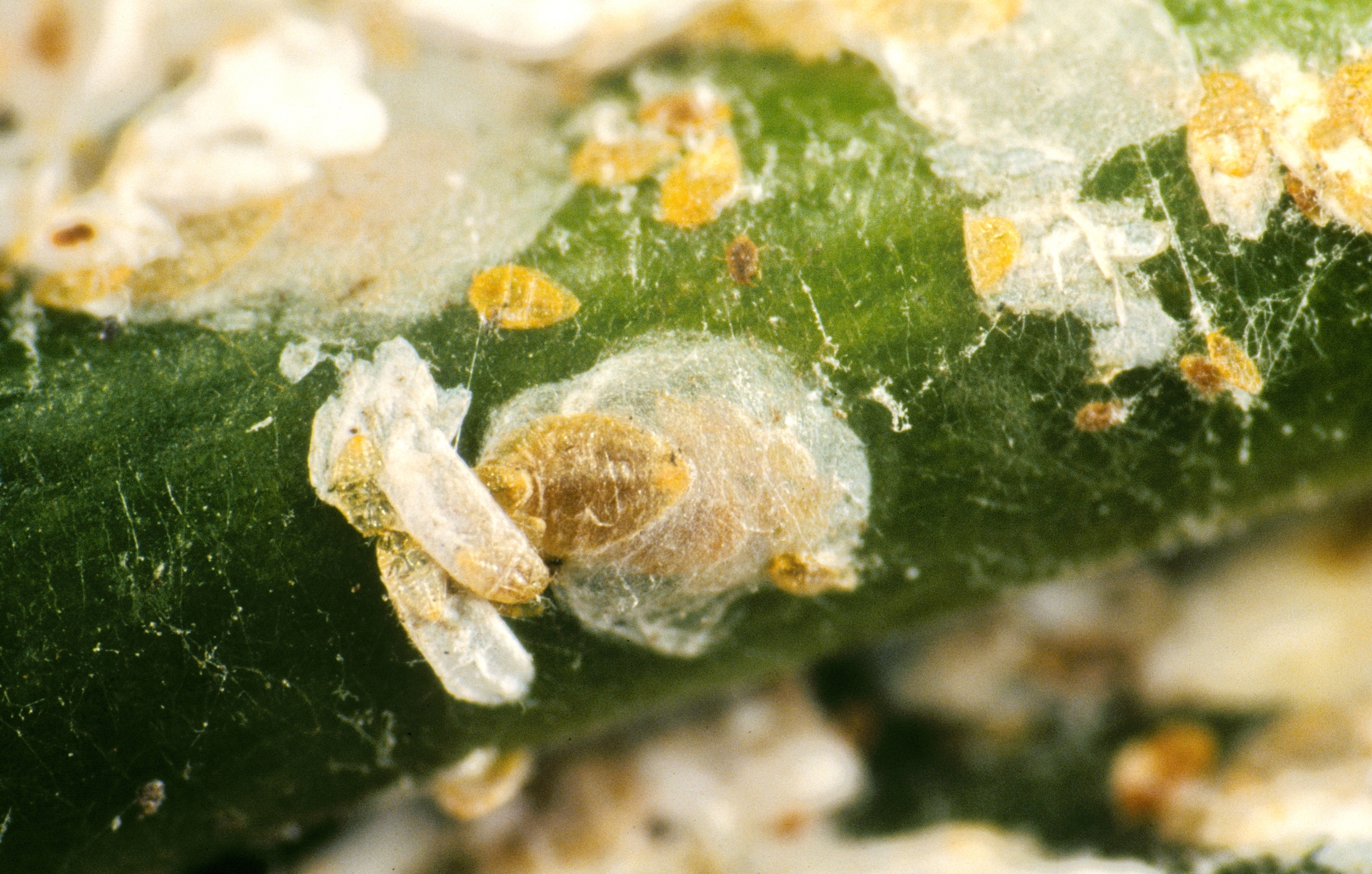
- Aulacaspis yasumatsui the cycad aulacaspis scale

Scientific classification
- Domain: Eukaryota
- Kingdom: Animalia
- Phylum: Arthropoda
- Class: Insecta
- Order: Hemiptera
- Suborder: Sternorrhyncha
- Family: Diaspididae
- Subfamily: Diaspidinae

Tribes
- Ancepaspidini; Antakaspidini; Diaspidini; Lepidosaphidini

= Diaspidinae =

Subfamily of true bugs

Diaspidinae is the largest subfamily of Diaspididae (the largest family of scale insects), with more than 200 genera in two tribes.

- Tribe Diaspidini
  - Subtribe Chionaspidina (cosmopolitan except South America, 48 genera)
  - Subtribe Diaspidina (cosmopolitan except Australasia, 13 genera)
  - Subtribe Fioriniina (almost exclusively Old World, 64 genera)
- Tribe Lepidosaphidini (cosmopolitan, 103 genera)
