= Victor Antoine Signoret =

French pharmacologist, physician and entomologist

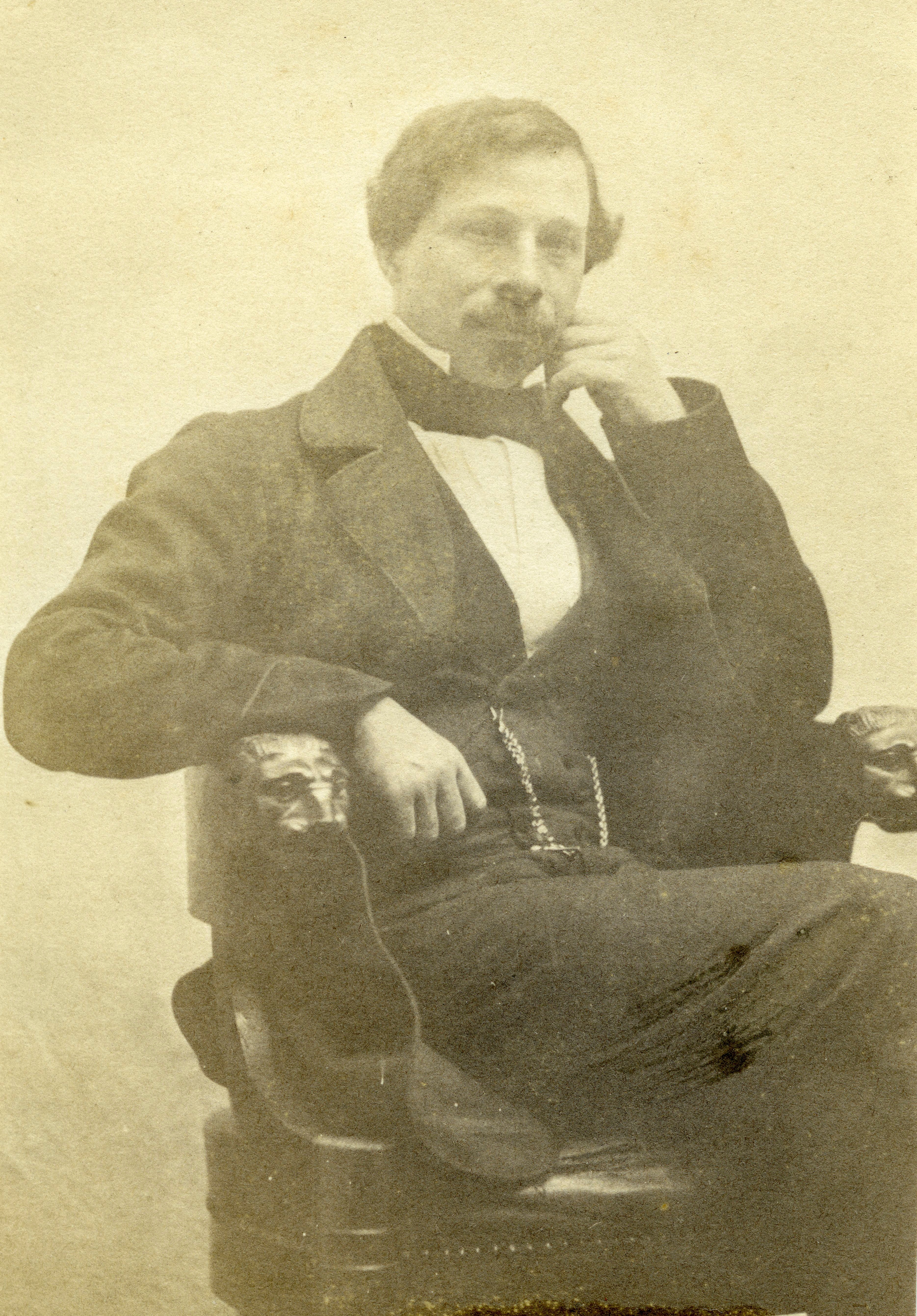
Victor Antoine Signoret.

Victor Antoine Signoret (6 April 1816, Paris – 3 April 1889, Paris) was a French pharmacologist, medical doctor and entomologist.

In 1845 Signoret gained his doctorate in pharmacology at the University of Paris. His thesis was entitled De l'Arsenic considéré sous ses divers points de vue. Pharmacology made him a wealthy man and he made many collecting trips mainly in Europe but also in Asia Minor. His very important collection is in the Naturhistorisches Museum, Vienna, Austria although there is significant material in La Specola museum in Florence.

Signoret worked on Hemiptera, and is considered to be one of the first great students of Coccoidea (mealybugs and scale insects). He established methods for the preparation of slides for the examination of mealybug morphology.

He wrote over 80 papers, including a Revision du groupe des Cydnides (1881–1884) and he was a Member of the Entomological Society of France, as well as an honour Fellow of the Entomological Society of London.

== Sources ==
- Jean Gouillard (2004). Histoire des entomologistes français, 1750-1950. Édition entièrement revue et augmentée. Boubée (Paris) : 287 p.
- Jean Lhoste (1987). Les Entomologistes français. 1750-1950. INRA Éditions : 351 p.
- Anthony Musgrave (1932). Bibliography of Australian Entomology, 1775-1930, with biographical notes on authors and collectors, Royal Zoological Society of News South Wales (Sydney) : viii + 380.
