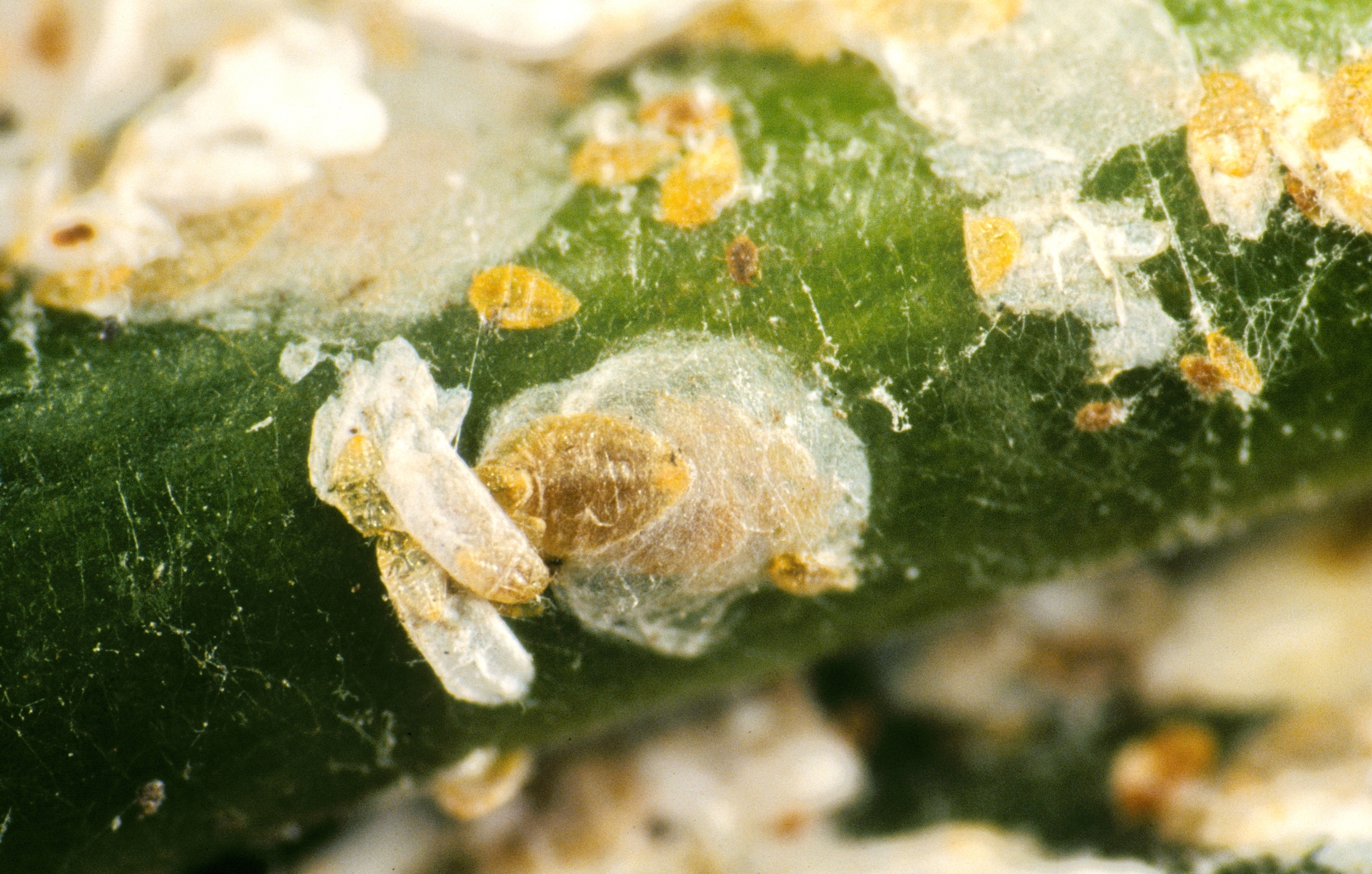
- Cycad aulacaspis scale

Scientific classification
- Domain: Eukaryota
- Kingdom: Animalia
- Phylum: Arthropoda
- Class: Insecta
- Order: Hemiptera
- Suborder: Sternorrhyncha
- Family: Diaspididae
- Genus: Aulacaspis
- Species: A. yasumatsui

Binomial name
- Aulacaspis yasumatsui Takagi, 1977

= Aulacaspis yasumatsui =

Species of true bug

Aulacaspis yasumatsui, or cycad aulacaspis scale (CAS), is a scale insect species in the genus Aulacaspis that feeds on cycad species such as Cycas revoluta or Dioon purpusii (Purpus' cycad). Other common names include the cycad scale, the sago palm scale, and the Asian cycad scale. This is a serious pest of cycads which can kill its host plant.

== Description ==
The adult female cycad aulacaspis scale has a flattened, circular or pear-shaped cover, often distorted in shape by the close proximity of leaf veins or other scale insects. The cover is white, and may be translucent enough to see the orange coloured insect with its orange eggs beneath. White or pale yellow shed skins are seen on the margin of the cover. The adult male has an elongated cover with parallel sides; it is white and felted, with shed skins similar in colour to the female. In light infestations, these scales are on the undersides of the leaves, but in heavier infestations they also occur on the upper surface and on the roots, at depths down to about 60 cm (24 in).

== Distribution ==
The cycad aulacaspis scale is native to tropical and sub-tropical parts of southeastern Asia. It was first described in 1977 by Tagaki in Thailand, and its range also includes Singapore, Malaysia and China, and it is also known from the Cayman Islands, Puerto Rico and the US Virgin Islands. More recently, it was detected in Florida in 1996 and had spread to Hawaii by 2000. It was discovered at the National Botanical Research Institute at Lucknow in India in 2007, on Microcycas calocoma, an endangered species of cycad; this infestation was contained and eradicated by intensive treatment.

== Hosts ==
This scale is restricted in host range to Cycas, Dioon, Encephalartos, Macrozamia, Microcycas and Stangeria, but of these, it seems to have a preference for Cycas.

== Biology ==
Adult females lay one hundred or more eggs and these hatch in eight to twelve days. The first instar stage has legs and is known as a "crawler". The juveniles then develop through several other instar stages over a period of about twenty-eight days before reaching maturity. All life stages after the crawler stage feed on the host plant by piercing the epidermis and sucking sap. Crawlers often get carried away by the wind, landing on neighbouring plants and infesting them. In a heavy infestation, the fronds of cycads become covered with a thick white layer of scale insects. Even when the adult insects die, they remain attached to the host. Heavy infestations can kill the host plant, and insects present on the roots can re-infest the aerial parts of the plant if the scales there are killed.
