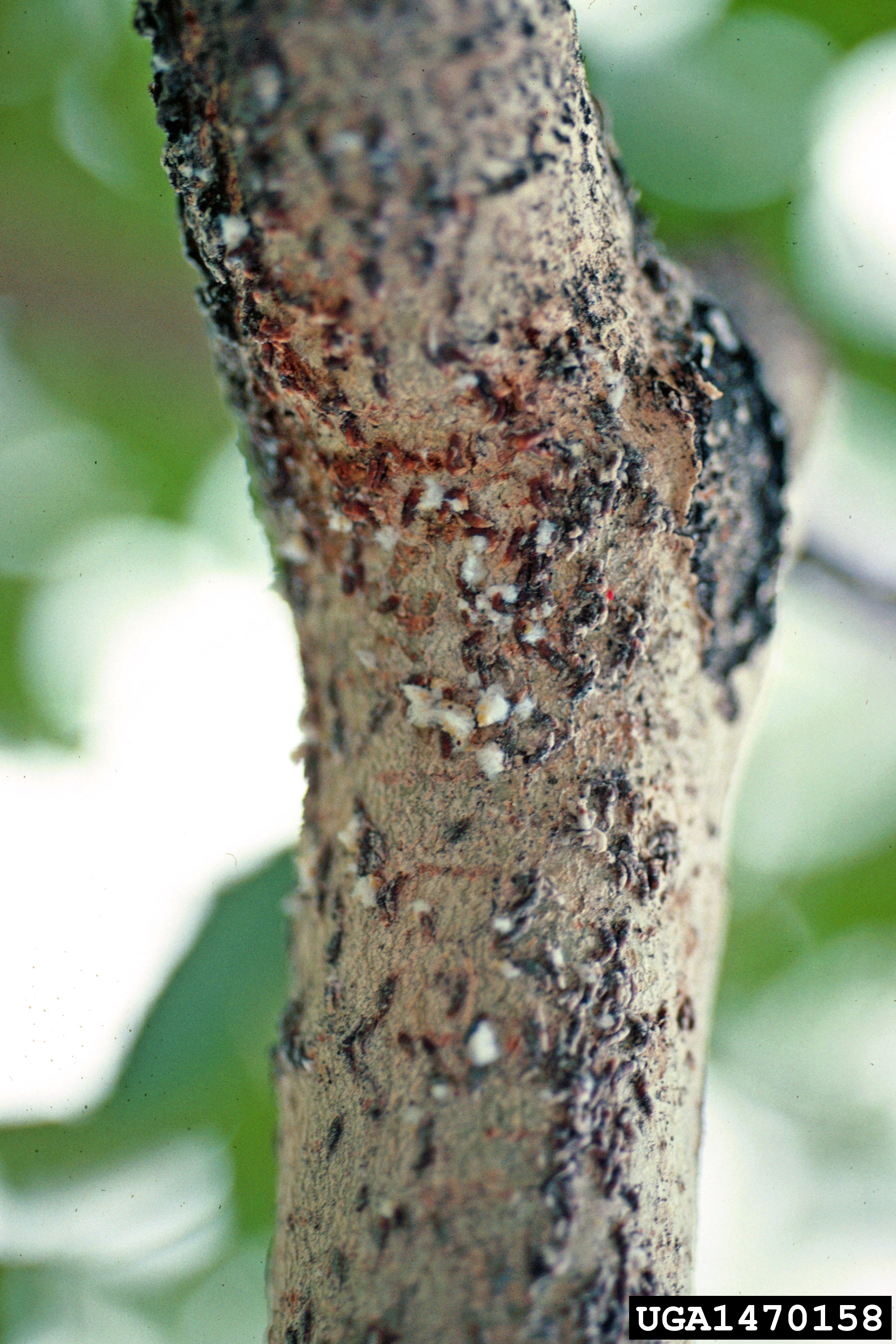
- Lepidosaphes ulmi (Oystershell scale) on tree.

Scientific classification
- Domain: Eukaryota
- Kingdom: Animalia
- Phylum: Arthropoda
- Class: Insecta
- Order: Hemiptera
- Suborder: Sternorrhyncha
- Family: Diaspididae
- Subfamily: Diaspidinae
- Tribe: Lepidosaphidini; Shimer

= Lepidosaphidini =

Tribe of scale insects

Lepidosaphidini is a tribe of armored scale insects.

== Genera ==
The following genera belong to the tribe Lepidosaphidini.

- Acanthomytilus Borchsenius, 1947
- Adiscodiaspis Marchal, 1909
- Allantomytilus Leonardi, 1898
- Ambigaspis MacGillivray, 1921
- Andaspis MacGillivray, 1921
- Annulaspis Ferris, 1938
- AntakaspisMamet, 1959
- Aonidomytilus Leonardi, 1904
- Balaspis Hall, 1946
- Bayuraspis Takagi, 2003
- Berlesaspis MacGillivray, 1921
- Caia Williams, 1963
- Chusqueaspis Amouroux, 2020
- Coccomytilus Leonardi, 1898
- Crassaspis Ferris, 1941
- Cryptaspidus Lindinger, 1910
- Cynodontaspis Takagi, 1962
- Dactylaspis Ferris, 1937
- Daraspis Hall, 1946
- Dentaspis MacGillivray, 1921
- Diaspidistis Hempel, 1900
- Dinaspis Leonardi, 1911
- Discodiaspis Koronéos, 1934
- Emmereziaspis Mamet, 1941
- Eucleaspis Munting, 1968
- Eudinaspis Lizer & Trelles, 1942
- Exuviaspis Ferris, 1941
- Faureaspis Munting, 1968
- Felixiella Almeida, 1973
- Ferreroaspis Kozár, 1983
- Ferrisidea Borchsenius, 1965
- Fulaspis Balachowsky, 1952
- Galeomytilus Takagi, 1995
- Galeraspis Mamet 1939
- Gynandraspis Balachowsky & Matile-Ferrero, 1980
- Hexandaspis Takagi, 2003
- Hovaspis Mamet 1954
- Howardia Berlese & Leonardi, 1898
- Hulaspis Hall, 1946
- Imerinaspis Mamet, 1959
- Kandraspis Mamet, 1959
- Koroneaspis Bodenheimer, 1943
- Lapazia Ferris, 1921
- Leonardianna MacGillivray, 1921
- Lepidosaphes Shimer, 1868
- Madagaspis Mamet, 1950
- Madaparlaspis Mamet, 1962
- Mancaspis Ferris 1941
- Maskellanna MacGillivray, 1921
- Mauritiaspis Mamet, 1939
- Melayumytilus Takagi, 1992
- Mempelaspis Takagi, 2000
- Mercetaspis Gómez-Menor, 1927
- Mimusaspis Mamet, 1942
- Mitraspis Ferris 1941
- Mitulaspis MacGillivray, 1921
- Mohelnaspis Šulc, 1937
- Neoischnaspis Fonseca, 1969
- Neoparlaspis Hempel, 1934
- Neopinnaspis McKenzie, 1949
- Neopseudoparlatoria González, 2015
- Niveaspis MacGillivray, 1921
- Notandaspis Williams & Brookes, 1995
- Operculaspis Laing, 1925
- Opuntiaspis Cockerell, 1893
- Osiraspis Hall, 1928
- Palauaspis Beardsley, 1966
- Pallulaspis Ferris, 1937
- Pandanaspis Mamet, 1967
- Paradiaspis Lahille, 1919
- Paraepidiaspis Balachowsky, 1956
- Paraleucaspis Mamet, 1954
- Parandaspis Mamet, 1967
- Parapandanaspis Mamet, 1967
- Paraparlagena Mamet, 1959
- Phaulomytilus Leonardi, 1898
- Poliaspoides Mac Gillivray, 1921
- Praecocaspis Ferris, 1942
- Primaspis Howell, 1995
- Prodigiaspis Ferris, 1941
- Pseudodonaspis Henderson, 2011
- Pseudoleucaspis Mamet, 1939
- Pseudoparlatoria Cockerell, 1892
- Pudaspis Hall, 1946
- Ramachandraspis Rao, 1953
- Rugaspidiotinus Balachowsky, 1953
- Rugpapuaspis Ben-Dov, 1991
- Sakaramyaspis Mamet, 1954
- Santubongia Takagi 2003
- Saotomaspis Balachowsky, 1973
- Scleromytilus Hall, 1946
- Scytalaspis Ferris, 1955
- Serrataspis Ferris, 1955
- Situlaspis Mac Gillivray, 1921
- Stramenaspis Ferris, 1937
- Symeria Green, 1929
- Torosaspis Ülgentürk & Kozár, 2012
- Triaspidis Mac Gillivray, 1921
- Triraphaspis Balachowsky, 1954
- Tulefiorinia Mamet, 1959
- Velataspis Ferris, 1937
- Vinculaspis Ferris, 1942
- Xerophilaspis Cockerell, 1897
- Youngus Özdikmen, 2011
