= Orcus lafertei =

Scientific classification
- Kingdom: Animalia
- Phylum: Arthropoda
- Clade: Pancrustacea
- Class: Insecta
- Order: Coleoptera
- Suborder: Polyphaga
- Infraorder: Cucujiformia
- Family: Coccinellidae
- Genus: Orcus
- Species: O. lafertei

Binomial name
- Orcus lafertei Mulsant, 1853

Species of beetle

Orcus lafertei is a species of beetle of the family Coccinellidae. It is found in Australia (Queensland, New South Wales) and Papua New Guinea.

== Description ==
They are similar to Orcus cyanocephalus, but may be distinguished by the strong purple or greenish metallic reflection on the elytra.
