= Edward Chapin =

Edward Chapin may refer to:

- Edward Payson Chapin (1831–1863), American lawyer and soldier
- Edward Albert Chapin (1894–1969), American entomologist
