= Hylaeus cyanophilus =

Scientific classification
- Kingdom: Animalia
- Phylum: Arthropoda
- Clade: Pancrustacea
- Class: Insecta
- Order: Hymenoptera
- Family: Colletidae
- Genus: Hylaeus
- Species: H. cyanophilus

Binomial name
- Hylaeus cyanophilus (Cockerell, 1910)

Synonyms
- Prosopis cyanophila Cockerell, 1910; Prosopis nigropersonata Cockerell, 1910

Species of bee

Hylaeus cyanophilus, or Hylaeus (Laccohylaeus) cyanophilus, is a species of bee in the family Colletidae and subfamily Hylaeinae. It is endemic to Australia. It was described by British-American entomologist Theodore Dru Alison Cockerell in 1910.

== Description ==
Male body length is about 6 mm. Integumental colouration is mainly black, with yellow markings and dark steel blue abdomen.

== Distribution and habitat ==
The species occurs in eastern Australia. The type locality is Mackay, Queensland. Other published localities include Goodna and Redlynch in Queensland, as well as Manning Valley in north-eastern New South Wales.

== Behaviour ==
The adults are flying mellivores.
