= Zagreus (disambiguation) =

Zagreus is a god in Greek religion and mythology.

Zagreus may also refer to:

- Zagreus (audio drama), based on the British television series Doctor Who
- Zagreus (beetle), a genus of insects in the family Coccinellidae
- Zagreus (Hades), the protagonist of the video game Hades
- Zagreus Ridge, an ice-free ridge on the Oscar II Coast on the Antarctic Peninsula.
- Papilio zagreus, a South American butterfly
