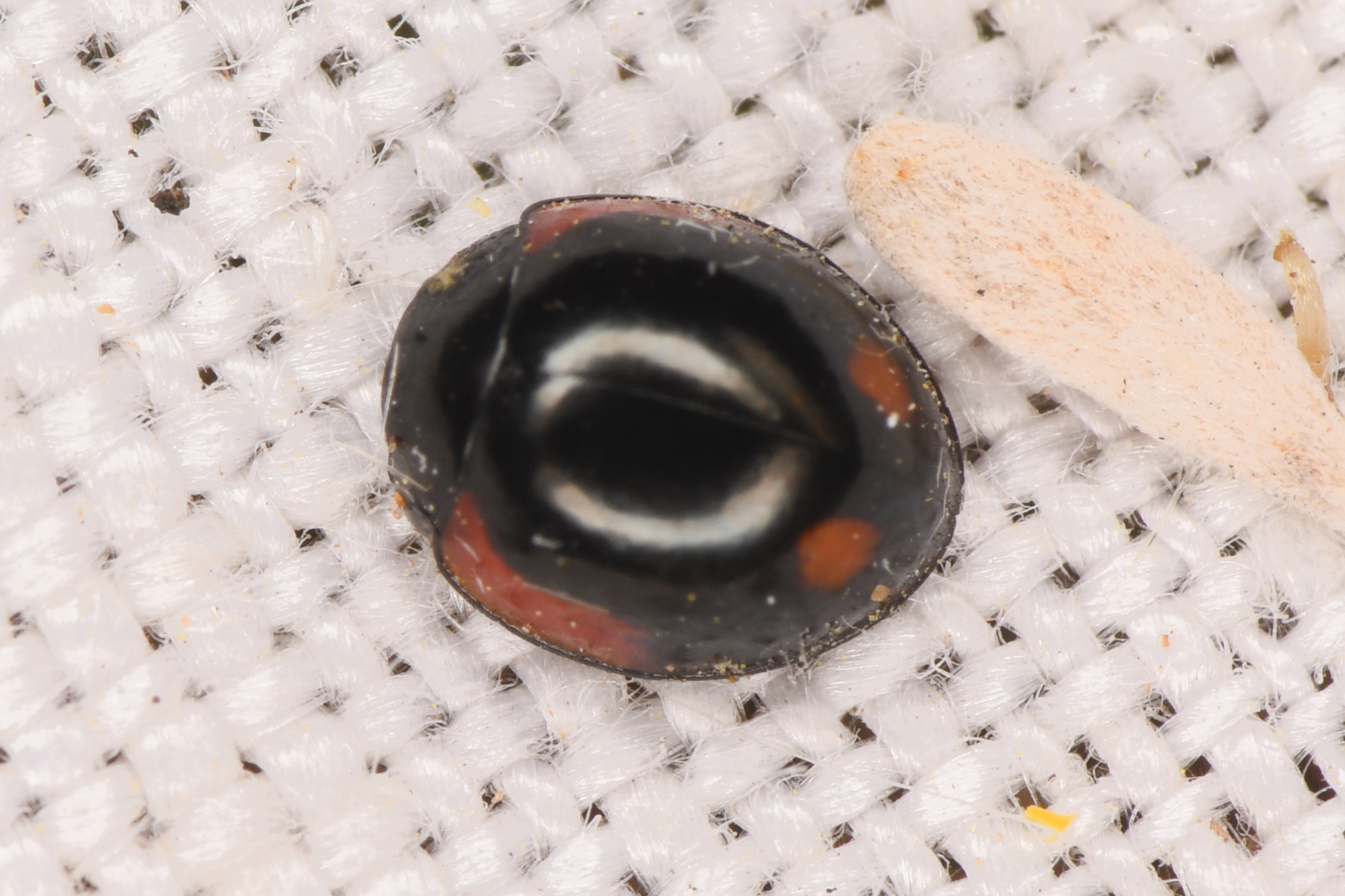

Scientific classification
- Kingdom: Animalia
- Phylum: Arthropoda
- Clade: Pancrustacea
- Class: Insecta
- Order: Coleoptera
- Suborder: Polyphaga
- Infraorder: Cucujiformia
- Family: Coccinellidae
- Genus: Brumoides
- Species: B. histrio

Binomial name
- Brumoides histrio (Fall, 1901)

Synonyms
- Exochomus histrio Fall, 1901; Exochomus parvicollis Casey, 1908

= Brumoides histrio =

Species of beetle

Brumoides histrio is a species of lady beetle in the family Coccinellidae. It is found in North America, where it has been recorded from Utah to Arizona and southern California.

== Description ==
Adults reach a length of about 2.75-4.0 mm. Adults have a colour pattern that is similar to Brumoides septentrionis.
