= Thaneroclerus buquet =

Scientific classification
- Domain: Eukaryota
- Kingdom: Animalia
- Phylum: Arthropoda
- Class: Insecta
- Order: Coleoptera
- Suborder: Polyphaga
- Infraorder: Cucujiformia
- Family: Thanerocleridae
- Genus: Thaneroclerus
- Species: T. buquet

Binomial name
- Thaneroclerus buquet (Lefebvre, 1835)

Species of beetle

Thaneroclerus buquet is a species of checkered beetle in the family Thanerocleridae. It is found in Europe and Northern Asia (excluding China), North America, Oceania, and Southern Asia.
