= Harpasus (beetle) =

Scientific classification
- Kingdom: Animalia
- Phylum: Arthropoda
- Clade: Pancrustacea
- Class: Insecta
- Order: Coleoptera
- Suborder: Polyphaga
- Infraorder: Cucujiformia
- Family: Coccinellidae
- Subfamily: Coccinellinae
- Tribe: Chilocorini
- Genus: Harpasus; Mulsant, 1850

Genus of beetles

Harpasus is a genus of lady beetles in the family Coccinellidae. There are at least 7 described species, found in Colombia, Peru & Brazil.

== Species ==
These 7 species belong to the genus Harpasus:

- Harpasus aureus Almeida & Carvalho, 2006 Brazil
- Harpasus eversmanni (Mulsant, 1850) Brazil
- Harpasus ferrugineus Corrêa & Almeida, 2010 Colombia
- Harpasus pallidilabris (Mulsant, 1850) Brazil
- Harpasus quadrifolium González, Corrêa & Almeida, 2008 Peru
- Harpasus unifasciatus Corrêa & Almeida, 2010 Brazil
- Harpasus zonatus (Mulsant, 1850) Brazil
