= Endochilus epipleuralis =

Scientific classification
- Kingdom: Animalia
- Phylum: Arthropoda
- Clade: Pancrustacea
- Class: Insecta
- Order: Coleoptera
- Suborder: Polyphaga
- Infraorder: Cucujiformia
- Family: Coccinellidae
- Genus: Endochilus
- Species: E. epipleuralis

Binomial name
- Endochilus epipleuralis Mader, 1954

Species of beetle

Endochilus epipleuralis is a species of beetle of the family Coccinellidae. It is found in the Democratic Republic of the Congo.

== Description ==
Adults reach a length of about 4.2 mm (0.17 in). The head and pronotum are dark red and the antennae are brownish. The scutellum is dark red and the elytra are bright red with dark red margins. The dorsal surface is mostly glabrous, but the pronotal angles and elytral margins are covered with setae. The ventral surface is dark reddish.
