= Brumoides blumi =

Scientific classification
- Kingdom: Animalia
- Phylum: Arthropoda
- Clade: Pancrustacea
- Class: Insecta
- Order: Coleoptera
- Suborder: Polyphaga
- Infraorder: Cucujiformia
- Family: Coccinellidae
- Genus: Brumoides
- Species: B. blumi

Binomial name
- Brumoides blumi (Nunenmacher, 1934)

Synonyms
- Brumus blumi Nunenmacher, 1934

Species of beetle

Brumoides blumi is a species of beetle of the family Coccinellidae. It is found in North America, where it has been recorded from California.

== Description ==
Adults reach a length of about 2.60–3.30 mm. Adults are black, with the antennae and mouthparts yellowish brown.
