= Orcus cinctus =

Scientific classification
- Kingdom: Animalia
- Phylum: Arthropoda
- Clade: Pancrustacea
- Class: Insecta
- Order: Coleoptera
- Suborder: Polyphaga
- Infraorder: Cucujiformia
- Family: Coccinellidae
- Genus: Orcus
- Species: O. cinctus

Binomial name
- Orcus cinctus Weise, 1902

Species of beetle

Orcus cinctus is a species of beetle of the family Coccinellidae. It is found in New Guinea and on New Britain.

== Description ==
Adults reach a length of about 2.7–3.2 mm (0.11–0.13 in), but specimens from New Britain are larger, reaching a length of above 4 mm (0.16 in). The head and pronotum are yellowish brown and the elytra are dark chestnut brown with a bluish metallic sheen. Each elytron has a yellowish outer margin.
