= Endochilus =

Scientific classification
- Kingdom: Animalia
- Phylum: Arthropoda
- Clade: Pancrustacea
- Class: Insecta
- Order: Coleoptera
- Suborder: Polyphaga
- Infraorder: Cucujiformia
- Family: Coccinellidae
- Subfamily: Coccinellinae
- Tribe: Chilocorini
- Genus: Endochilus; Weise, 1898

Genus of beetles

Endochilus is a genus of beetles belonging to the family Coccinellidae.

== Species ==
- Endochilus abdominalis
- Endochilus brunneocinctus
- Endochilus cavifrons
- Endochilus compater
- Endochilus epipleuralis
- Endochilus minor
- Endochilus niger
- Endochilus plagiatus
- Endochilus rubicundus
- Endochilus styx
- Endochilus weisei
