= Arawana =

Scientific classification
- Kingdom: Animalia
- Phylum: Arthropoda
- Clade: Pancrustacea
- Class: Insecta
- Order: Coleoptera
- Suborder: Polyphaga
- Infraorder: Cucujiformia
- Family: Coccinellidae
- Tribe: Chilocorini
- Genus: Arawana; Leng, 1908

Genus of beetles

Arawana is a genus of ladybirds in the tribe Chilocorini, which is in the subfamily Chilocorinae. There are at least four described species in Arawana.

== Species ==
These four species belong to the genus Arawana.

- Arawana darieli Rodríguez-Vélez, Chan-Canche & Sandoval-Cauich, 2024
- Arawana arizonica (Casey, 1899)
- Arawana cubensis (Dimmock, 1906)
- Arawana scapularis (Gorham, 1894)
