= Halmus coelestris =

Scientific classification
- Kingdom: Animalia
- Phylum: Arthropoda
- Clade: Pancrustacea
- Class: Insecta
- Order: Coleoptera
- Suborder: Polyphaga
- Infraorder: Cucujiformia
- Family: Coccinellidae
- Genus: Halmus
- Species: H. coelestris

Binomial name
- Halmus coelestris (Blackburn, 1891)

Species of beetle

Halmus coelestris is a species of lady beetle in the family Coccinellidae and the genus Halmus. It is widely distributed Australia and New Guinea. Its main food source is a variety of small insects including but not limited to scale insects, psyllids, whitefly and free living gall mites (Eriophyoidea).

== Appearance ==
Halmus coelestris is approximately 2.5 to 3.9 mm in length. it has a metallic bluish or greenish smooth dorsal surface. the presence of a straight anterior border on the clypeus distinguishes H. coelestris from others in its genus.
