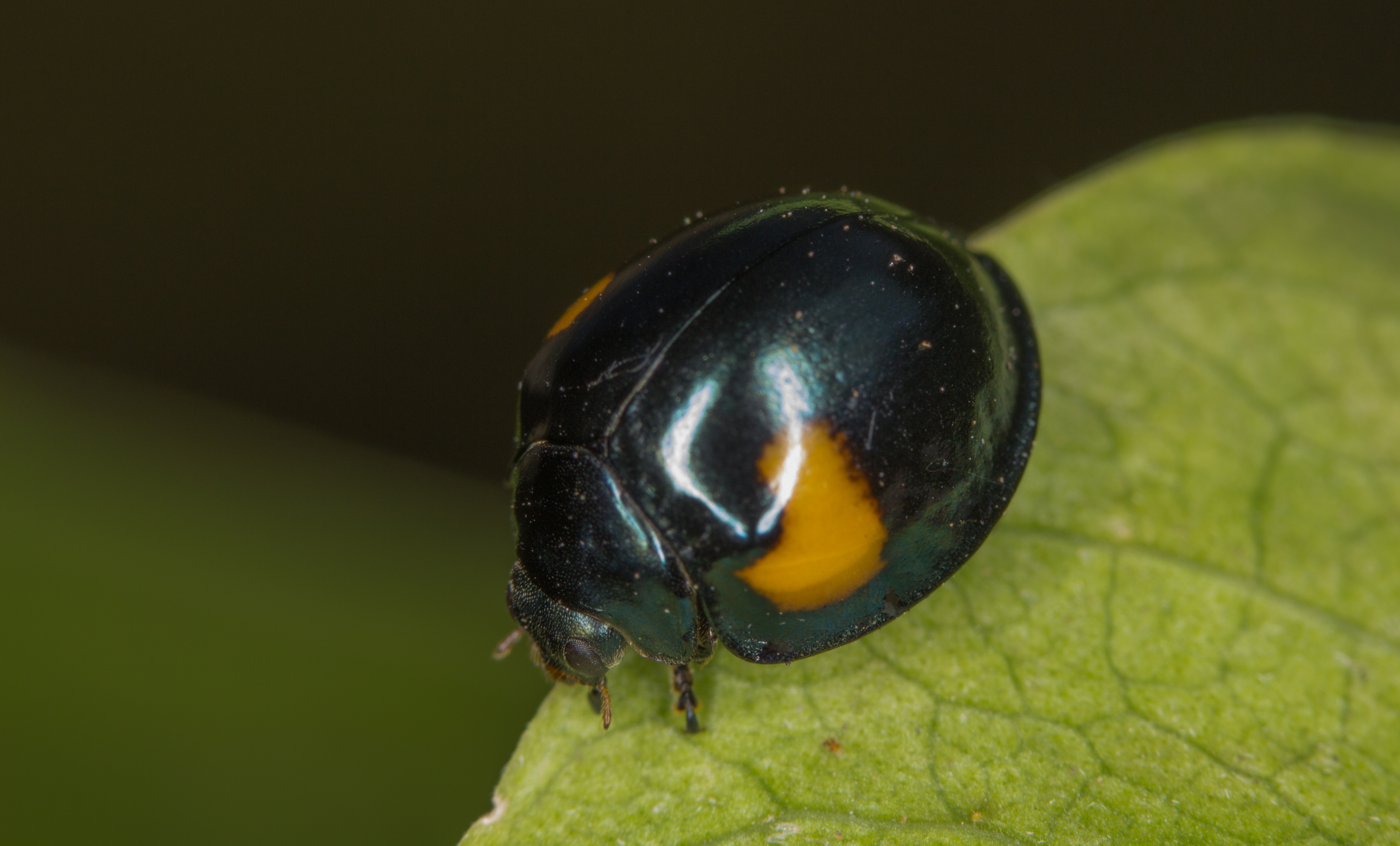
- Orcus bilunulatus

Scientific classification
- Kingdom: Animalia
- Phylum: Arthropoda
- Clade: Pancrustacea
- Class: Insecta
- Order: Coleoptera
- Suborder: Polyphaga
- Infraorder: Cucujiformia
- Family: Coccinellidae
- Subfamily: Coccinellinae
- Tribe: Chilocorini
- Genus: Orcus; Mulsant, 1850

Synonyms
- Priasus Mulsant, 1850; Parapriasus Chapin, 1965

= Orcus (beetle) =

Genus of beetles

Orcus is a genus of lady beetles in the family Coccinellidae. There are at least 18 described species in Orcus, found in Australia, New Guinea, New Caledonia, Java, Sumba, and the Kai Islands.

== Species ==
These 18 species belong to the genus Orcus:

- Orcus artensis Crotch, 1874 (New Caledonia)
- Orcus australasiae (Boisduval, 1835) (Australia)
- Orcus bilunulatus (Boisduval, 1835) (Australia)
- Orcus biroi Weise, 1902 (New Guinea)
- Orcus chujoi Bielawski, 1962 (New Caledonia)
- Orcus cinctus Weise, 1902 (New Guinea)
- Orcus citri Lea, 1902 (Australia)
- Orcus cordiformis sp. nov. (New Guinea)
- Orcus cyanocephalus Mulsant, 1850 (Australia, New Guinea)
- Orcus frommi Laczynski, 2012
- Orcus janthinus Mulsant, 1850 (Java, Sumba, New Guinea)
- Orcus lafertei Mulsant, 1853 (Australia)
- Orcus nietzschei Laczynski, 2012
- Orcus nigricollis Weise, 1902 (Key Islands, New Guinea)
- Orcus nummularis (Boisduval, 1835) (Australia)
- Orcus obscurus Blackburn, 1892 (Australia)
- Orcus popperi Laczynski, 2012
- Orcus punctulatus Blackburn, 1892 (Australia, New Guinea)
- Orcus quadrimaculatus Gadeau de Kerville, 1884 (Australia)
- Orcus tetrafasciatus Laczynski, 2009 (New Guinea)
- Orcus viridulus Laczynski, 2009 (New Guinea)

== Doubtful species ==
Orcus nepalicus was described from Nepal by Canepari in 2012, but it is thought to be a synonym of Chilocorus pakistanensis.
