= Orcus biroi =

Scientific classification
- Kingdom: Animalia
- Phylum: Arthropoda
- Clade: Pancrustacea
- Class: Insecta
- Order: Coleoptera
- Suborder: Polyphaga
- Infraorder: Cucujiformia
- Family: Coccinellidae
- Genus: Orcus
- Species: O. biroi

Binomial name
- Orcus biroi Weise, 1902

Synonyms
- Orcus biroi var. ruficollis Weise, 1902

Species of beetle

Orcus biroi is a species of beetle of the family Coccinellidae. It is found in New Guinea.

== Description ==
Adults reach a length of about 2.6–3.3 mm (0.10–0.13 in). The head is yellow and the pronotum is blackish with a bluish metallic sheen along the disk and with yellow lateral margins and anterior angles. The elytra are blackish or dark reddish with a blue shine.
