= Endochilus abdominalis =

Scientific classification
- Kingdom: Animalia
- Phylum: Arthropoda
- Clade: Pancrustacea
- Class: Insecta
- Order: Coleoptera
- Suborder: Polyphaga
- Infraorder: Cucujiformia
- Family: Coccinellidae
- Genus: Endochilus
- Species: E. abdominalis

Binomial name
- Endochilus abdominalis Łączyński & Tomaszewska, 2014

Species of beetle

Endochilus abdominalis is a species of beetle of the family Coccinellidae. It is found in Cameroon and Equatorial Guinea.

== Description ==
Adults reach a length of about 4.3–4.5 mm (0.17–0.18 in). The head and pronotum are dark red and the antennae are brownish. The scutellum and elytra are very dark red. The dorsal surface is glabrous, except for the pronotal angles and elytral margins which are covered with setae. The ventral surface is dark reddish to brownish.

== Etymology ==
The species name refers to the shape of the abdominal postcoxal lines, which are narrowly separated on intercoxal process, differently than in other Endochilus species.
