= Orcus tetrafasciatus =

Scientific classification
- Kingdom: Animalia
- Phylum: Arthropoda
- Clade: Pancrustacea
- Class: Insecta
- Order: Coleoptera
- Suborder: Polyphaga
- Infraorder: Cucujiformia
- Family: Coccinellidae
- Genus: Orcus
- Species: O. tetrafasciatus

Binomial name
- Orcus tetrafasciatus Laczynski & Tomaszewska, 2009

Species of beetle

Orcus tetrafasciatus is a species of beetle of the family Coccinellidae. It is found in Papua New Guinea.

== Description ==
Adults reach a length of about 3.1–3.4 mm (0.12–0.13 in). The dorsal surface is reddish, each elytron covered with two black stripes. The ventral surface is pale brown to reddish.

== Etymology ==
The species name refers to the four black stripes on the elytra.
