= Chapinaria =

Scientific classification
- Kingdom: Animalia
- Phylum: Arthropoda
- Clade: Pancrustacea
- Class: Insecta
- Order: Coleoptera
- Suborder: Polyphaga
- Infraorder: Cucujiformia
- Family: Coccinellidae
- Subfamily: Coccinellinae
- Tribe: Chilocorini
- Genus: Chapinaria; Łączyński & Tomaszewska, 2012
- Species: C. meridionalis

Binomial name
- Chapinaria meridionalis (Sicard, 1929)

Synonyms
- Endochilus meridionalis Sicard, 1929

Genus of beetles

Chapinaria is a genus of beetle of the family Coccinellidae. It is monotypic, being represented by the single species, Chapinaria meridionalis, which is found in Tanzania and Zambia.

== Description ==
Adults reach a length of about 2.6–3 mm (0.10–0.12 in). The head and pronotum are black and the antennae are brown. The scutellum is dark reddish and the elytra are dark reddish with black margins.

== Etymology ==
The genus is dedicated to Edward Chapin, an American Coleopterist.
