= Brumoides ceylonicus =

Scientific classification
- Kingdom: Animalia
- Phylum: Arthropoda
- Clade: Pancrustacea
- Class: Insecta
- Order: Coleoptera
- Suborder: Polyphaga
- Infraorder: Cucujiformia
- Family: Coccinellidae
- Genus: Brumoides
- Species: B. ceylonicus

Binomial name
- Brumoides ceylonicus (Weise, 1901)

Synonyms
- Brumus ceylonicus Weise, 1901

Species of beetle

Brumoides ceylonicus is a species of beetle of the family Coccinellidae. It is found in Sri Lanka.

== Description ==
They are yellowish-orange, with the scutellum yellow or yellowish with dark brown borders and the elytra with three black vittae.
