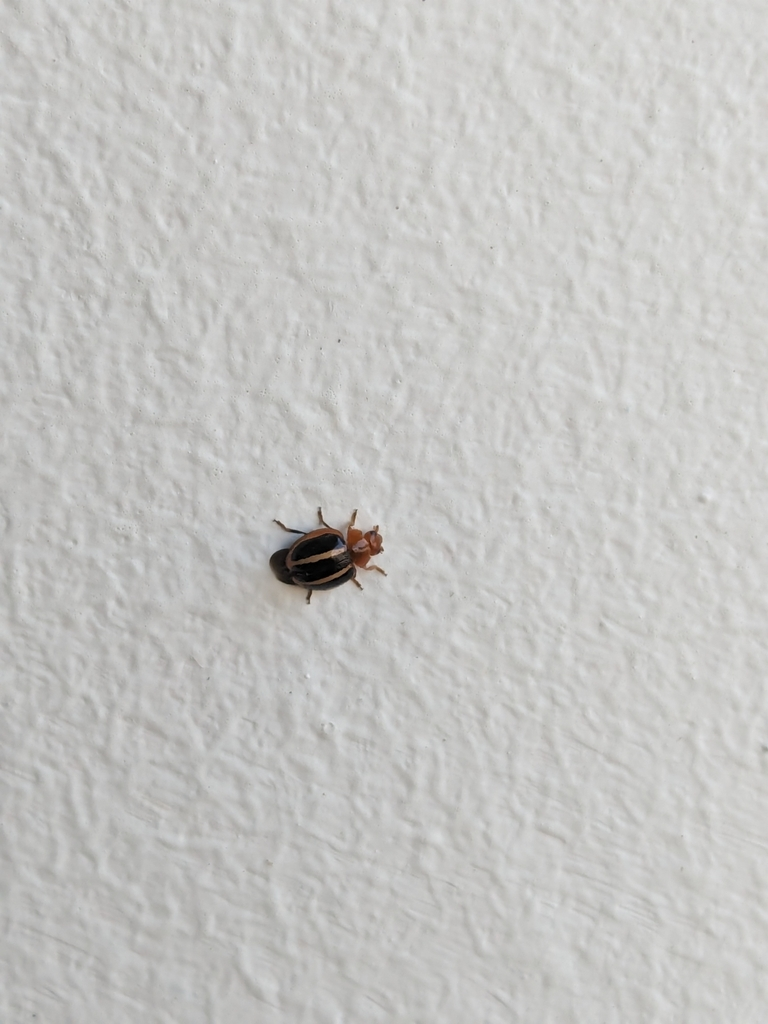

Scientific classification
- Kingdom: Animalia
- Phylum: Arthropoda
- Clade: Pancrustacea
- Class: Insecta
- Order: Coleoptera
- Suborder: Polyphaga
- Infraorder: Cucujiformia
- Family: Coccinellidae
- Genus: Brumoides
- Species: B. lineatus

Binomial name
- Brumoides lineatus (Weise, 1885)

Synonyms
- Brumus lineatus Weise, 1885; Chilocorus ruficollis Weise, 1885

= Brumoides lineatus =

Species of beetle

Brumoides lineatus, sometimes known as broad vein-longitudinal striped ladybug, is a species of lady beetle found in China, Myanmar, Thailand, Bangladesh, India, Sri Lanka, Nepal, and Pakistan.

== Description ==
Adults reach a length of about 2.5–3.2 mm (0.098–0.126 in). The head and pronotum are yellowish-orange, and the elytra have three black vittae.

== Life history ==
Primarily an aphidophagous species, it is known to feed on Aphis glycines, Melanaphis sacchari, Oracella acuta, Phenacoccus solenopsis and Planococcus citri.
