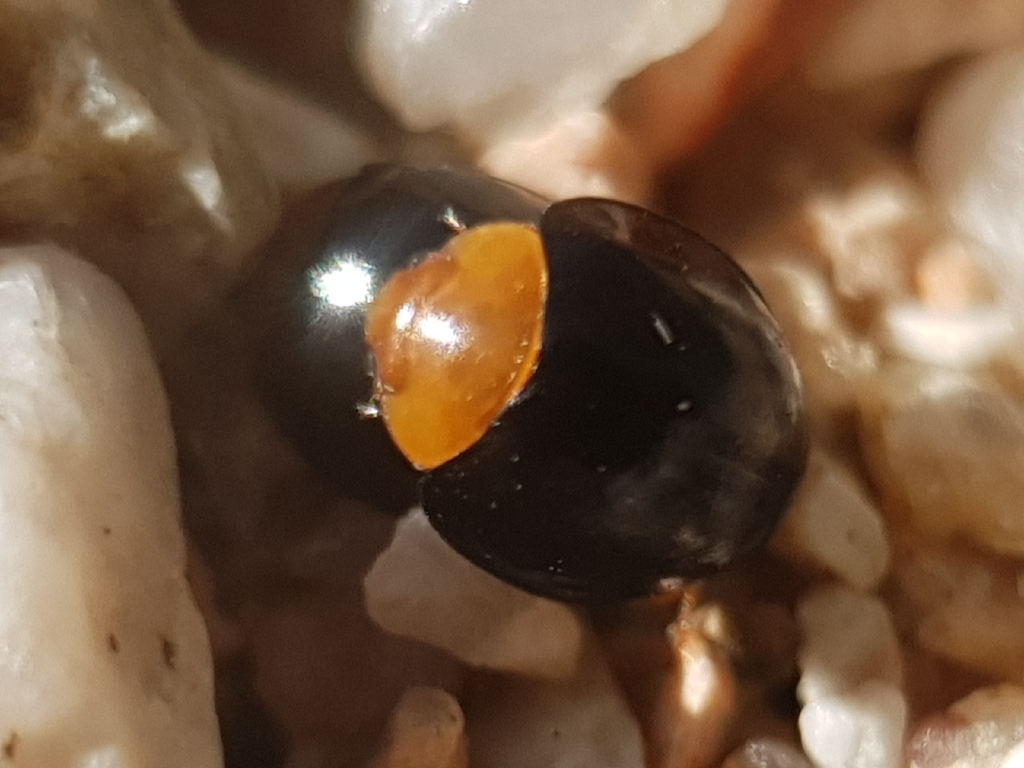

Scientific classification
- Kingdom: Animalia
- Phylum: Arthropoda
- Clade: Pancrustacea
- Class: Insecta
- Order: Coleoptera
- Suborder: Polyphaga
- Infraorder: Cucujiformia
- Family: Coccinellidae
- Genus: Parexochomus
- Species: P. nigripennis

Binomial name
- Parexochomus nigripennis (Erichson, 1843)

Synonyms
- Chilocorus nigripennis Erichson, 1843; Exochomus xanthoderus Fairmaire, 1863

= Parexochomus nigripennis =

Species of beetle

Parexochomus nigripennis is a species of beetle of the family Coccinellidae. It is found in India (New Delhi), Pakistan (North West Frontier Province, Punjab, Sindh), Afghanistan and the Afrotropical and Mediterranean regions, as well as the Middle East.

== Description ==
Adults reach a length of about 3.5–4.5 mm (0.14–0.18 in). The head and pronotum are yellowish and the elytra are black and shiny. The ventral surface is yellowish brown.

== Life history ==
They have been recorded preying on aphids and scale insects.
