= Endochilus niger =

Scientific classification
- Kingdom: Animalia
- Phylum: Arthropoda
- Clade: Pancrustacea
- Class: Insecta
- Order: Coleoptera
- Suborder: Polyphaga
- Infraorder: Cucujiformia
- Family: Coccinellidae
- Genus: Endochilus
- Species: E. niger

Binomial name
- Endochilus niger Fürsch, 1963

Species of beetle

Endochilus niger is a species of beetle of the family Coccinellidae. It is found in Guinea.

== Description ==
Adults reach a length of about 4.8–5 mm (0.19–0.20 in). The head and pronotum are black and the antennae are dark reddish. The scutellum and elytra are black. The dorsal surface is mostly glabrous, but the pronotal angles and elytral margins are covered with setae. The ventral surface is dark red to dark brown.
