= Endochilus weisei =

Scientific classification
- Kingdom: Animalia
- Phylum: Arthropoda
- Clade: Pancrustacea
- Class: Insecta
- Order: Coleoptera
- Suborder: Polyphaga
- Infraorder: Cucujiformia
- Family: Coccinellidae
- Genus: Endochilus
- Species: E. weisei

Binomial name
- Endochilus weisei Mader, 1954

Species of beetle

Endochilus weisei is a species of beetle of the family Coccinellidae. It is found in Cameroon and the Democratic Republic of the Congo.

== Description ==
Adults reach a length of about 4.1–4.2 mm (0.16–0.17 in). The head and pronotum are black and the antennae are brownish. The scutellum is black and the elytra are bright brown with black margins. The dorsal surface is glabrous, but the pronotum and elytral margins are covered with setae. The ventral surface is dark reddish to brown.
