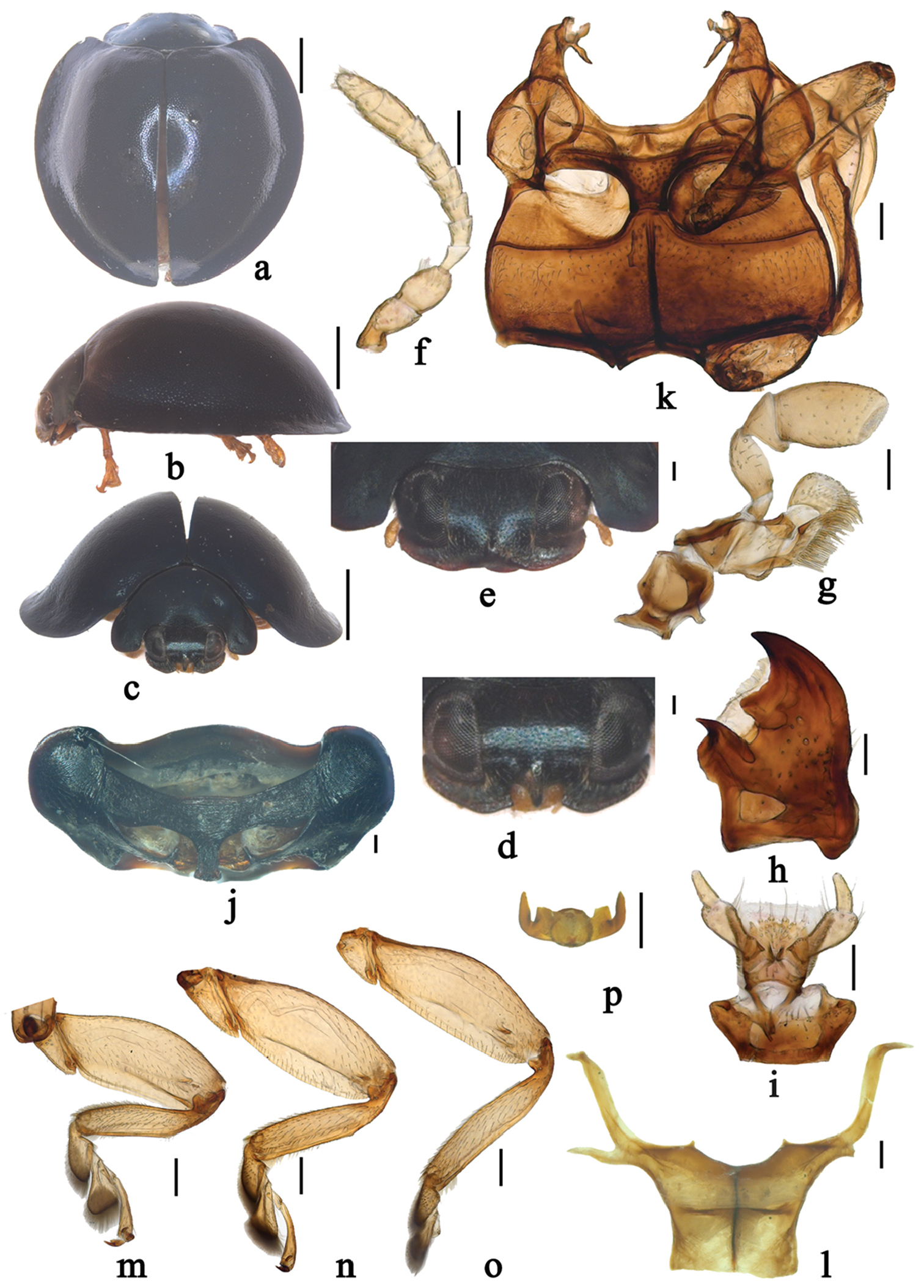

Scientific classification
- Kingdom: Animalia
- Phylum: Arthropoda
- Clade: Pancrustacea
- Class: Insecta
- Order: Coleoptera
- Suborder: Polyphaga
- Infraorder: Cucujiformia
- Family: Coccinellidae
- Subfamily: Coccinellinae
- Tribe: Chilocorini
- Genus: Renius; Li & Wang, 2017
- Species: R. cornutus

Binomial name
- Renius cornutus Li & Wang, 2017

= Renius cornutus =

Genus of beetles

Renius is a genus of beetle of the family Coccinellidae. It is monotypic, being represented by the single species, Renius cornutus, which is found in India (Arunachal Pradesh, Assam) and China (Tibet).

== Description ==
Adults reach a length of about 4.43–5 mm (0.174–0.197 in). The head is bluish black, while the rest of the dorsal surface is dark blue. The ventral surface is bluish black with yellow legs and a brownish black abdomen.
