= Orcus artensis =

Scientific classification
- Kingdom: Animalia
- Phylum: Arthropoda
- Clade: Pancrustacea
- Class: Insecta
- Order: Coleoptera
- Suborder: Polyphaga
- Infraorder: Cucujiformia
- Family: Coccinellidae
- Genus: Orcus
- Species: O. artensis

Binomial name
- Orcus artensis Crotch, 1874

Species of beetle

Orcus artensis is a species of beetle of the family Coccinellidae. It is found in New Caledonia.

== Description ==
Adults reach a length of about 4.1–4.4 mm (0.16–0.17 in). They pronotum is black and the elytra are yellow or reddish, each elytron with black, reddish or brownish bands. The ventral surface is dark brownish or black.
