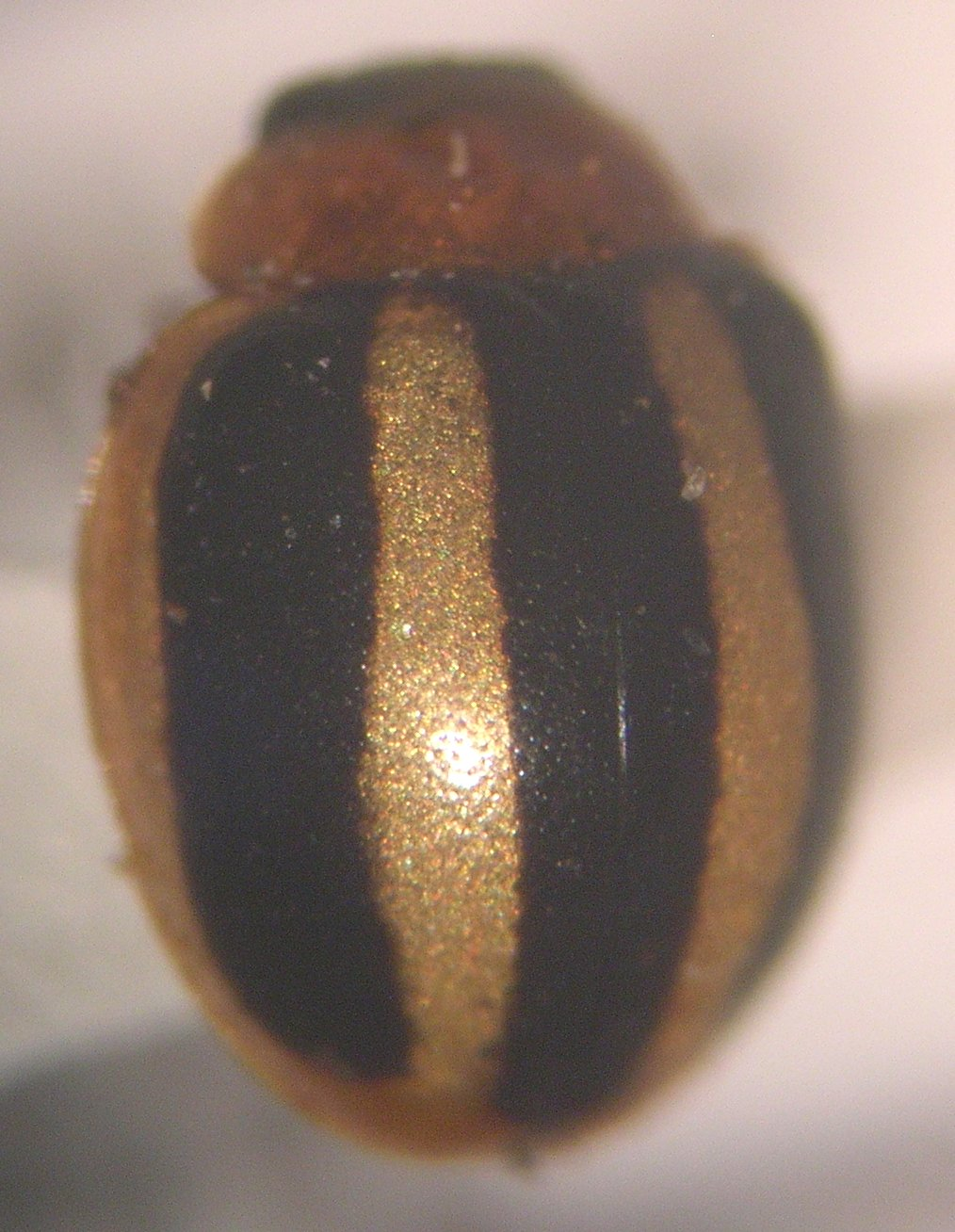
- Adult Brumoides suturalis

Scientific classification
- Kingdom: Animalia
- Phylum: Arthropoda
- Clade: Pancrustacea
- Class: Insecta
- Order: Coleoptera
- Suborder: Polyphaga
- Infraorder: Cucujiformia
- Family: Coccinellidae
- Subfamily: Coccinellinae
- Tribe: Chilocorini
- Genus: Brumoides; Chapin, 1965

= Brumoides =

Genus of beetles

Brumoides is a genus of beetles of the family Coccinellidae. The genus was erected by Edward Albert Chapin in 1965.

== Species ==
- Brumoides adenensis Fürsch, 1987
- Brumoides andamanensis Poorani, 2023
- Brumoides blumi (Nunenmacher, 1934)
- Brumoides ceylonicus (Weise, 1901)
- Brumoides engelhardi (Gorham, 1883)
- Brumoides foudrasii (Mulsant, 1850)
- Brumoides hainanensis Miyatake, 1970
- Brumoides histrio (Fall, 1901)
- Brumoides lineatus (Weise, 1885)
- Brumoides maai Miyatake, 1970
- Brumoides maculatus (Pope, 1954)
- Brumoides nigrosuturalis (Kapur, 1951)
- Brumoides ohtai Miyatake, 1970
- Brumoides piae Ślipiński & Giorgi, 2006
- Brumoides septentrionis (Weise, 1885)
- Brumoides suturalis (Fabricius, 1798)
