= Endochilus minor =

Scientific classification
- Kingdom: Animalia
- Phylum: Arthropoda
- Clade: Pancrustacea
- Class: Insecta
- Order: Coleoptera
- Suborder: Polyphaga
- Infraorder: Cucujiformia
- Family: Coccinellidae
- Genus: Endochilus
- Species: E. minor

Binomial name
- Endochilus minor Weise, 1898

Species of beetle

Endochilus minor is a species of beetle of the family Coccinellidae. It is found in Cameroon.

== Description ==
Adults reach a length of about 3.6–3.9 mm (0.14–0.15 in). The head and pronotum are dark red and the antennae are brownish. The scutellum is dark red and the elytra are bright red with dark red margins. The dorsal surface is mostly glabrous, but the pronotal angles and elytral margins are covered with some setae. The ventral surface is brown.
