= Arawana cubensis =

Scientific classification
- Kingdom: Animalia
- Phylum: Arthropoda
- Clade: Pancrustacea
- Class: Insecta
- Order: Coleoptera
- Suborder: Polyphaga
- Infraorder: Cucujiformia
- Family: Coccinellidae
- Genus: Arawana
- Species: A. cubensis

Binomial name
- Arawana cubensis (Dimmock, 1906)

Synonyms
- Exochomus cubensis Dimmock, 1906

Species of beetle

Arawana cubensis is a species of beetle of the family Coccinellidae. It is found in Cuba.

== Description ==
The dorsal surface is mostly black with a quadrilateral red spot, and the colour of the ventral surface is mostly black.
