= Endochilus plagiatus =

Scientific classification
- Kingdom: Animalia
- Phylum: Arthropoda
- Clade: Pancrustacea
- Class: Insecta
- Order: Coleoptera
- Suborder: Polyphaga
- Infraorder: Cucujiformia
- Family: Coccinellidae
- Genus: Endochilus
- Species: E. plagiatus

Binomial name
- Endochilus plagiatus Sicard, 1921

Species of beetle

Endochilus plagiatus is a species of beetle of the family Coccinellidae. It is found in São Tomé and Principe.

== Description ==
Adults reach a length of about 3.15–3.18 mm (0.124–0.125 in). The head and pronotum are dark red and the antennae are brownish. The scutellum is black and the elytra are dark red with a black patch, black bordering around the elytral discs and bright red margins. The dorsal surface is mostly glabrous, but the pronotum, base of the elytra and margins are covered with setae. The ventral surface is dark red to brownish.
