= Orcus chujoi =

Scientific classification
- Kingdom: Animalia
- Phylum: Arthropoda
- Clade: Pancrustacea
- Class: Insecta
- Order: Coleoptera
- Suborder: Polyphaga
- Infraorder: Cucujiformia
- Family: Coccinellidae
- Genus: Orcus
- Species: O. chujoi

Binomial name
- Orcus chujoi Bielawski, 1961

Species of beetle

Orcus chujoi is a species of beetle of the family Coccinellidae. It is found in New Caledonia.

== Description ==
Adults reach a length of about 3.3–3.5 mm (0.13–0.14 in). The head is black and the pronotum is black with yellow lateral margins and anterior angles. The elytra are pale yellow with two black stripes on each elytron.
