= Orcus nietzschei =

Scientific classification
- Kingdom: Animalia
- Phylum: Arthropoda
- Clade: Pancrustacea
- Class: Insecta
- Order: Coleoptera
- Suborder: Polyphaga
- Infraorder: Cucujiformia
- Family: Coccinellidae
- Genus: Orcus
- Species: O. nietzschei

Binomial name
- Orcus nietzschei Laczynski, 2012

Species of beetle

Orcus nietzschei is a species of beetle of the family Coccinellidae. It is found in Papua New Guinea.

== Description ==
Adults reach a length of about 2.85–3.02 mm (0.112–0.119 in). The head and pronotum are orange and the antennae are blackish. The scutellum is black and the elytra are light bluish, but darker along the suture and with a strong greenish metallic reflection.

== Etymology ==
The species is dedicated to the German philosopher Friedrich Nietzsche.
