= Endochilus rubicundus =

Scientific classification
- Kingdom: Animalia
- Phylum: Arthropoda
- Clade: Pancrustacea
- Class: Insecta
- Order: Coleoptera
- Suborder: Polyphaga
- Infraorder: Cucujiformia
- Family: Coccinellidae
- Genus: Endochilus
- Species: E. rubicundus

Binomial name
- Endochilus rubicundus Weise, 1898

Species of beetle

Endochilus rubicundus is a species of beetle of the family Coccinellidae. It is found in Cameroon.

== Description ==
Adults reach a length of about 5.14–5.16 mm (0.202–0.203 in). The head is dark red with brownish antennae and the pronotum is bright red. The scutellum is dark red and the elytra are bright red with dark red margins. The dorsal surface is mostly glabrous, but the pronotal angles and elytral margins are covered with some setae. The ventral surface is brownish.
