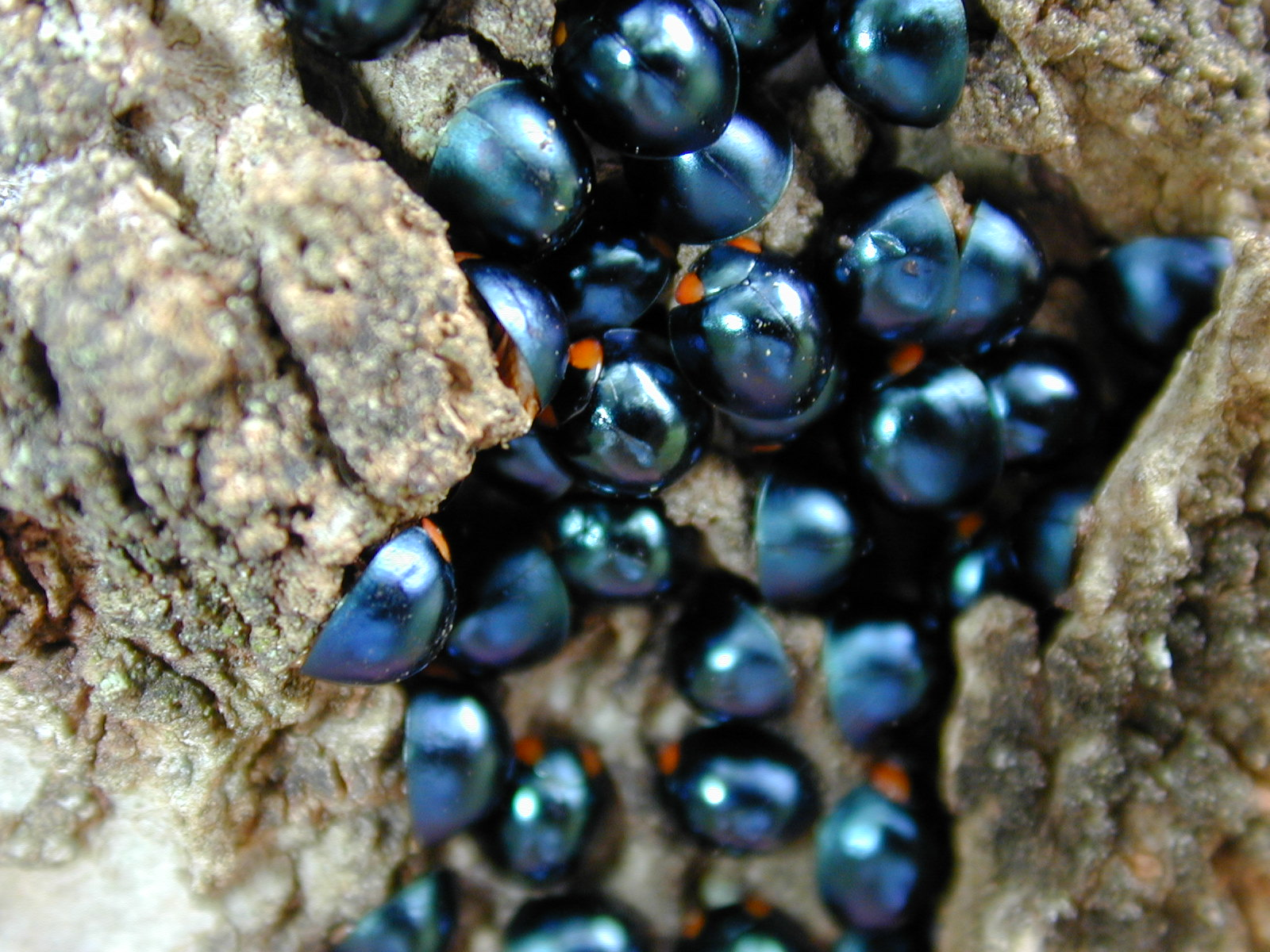

Scientific classification
- Kingdom: Animalia
- Phylum: Arthropoda
- Clade: Pancrustacea
- Class: Insecta
- Order: Coleoptera
- Suborder: Polyphaga
- Infraorder: Cucujiformia
- Family: Coccinellidae
- Genus: Curinus
- Species: C. coeruleus

Binomial name
- Curinus coeruleus (Mulsant, 1850)

Synonyms
- Orcus coeruleus Mulsant, 1850

= Curinus coeruleus =

Species of beetle

Curinus coeruleus is a species of beetle of the family Coccinellidae. It is found in South America (including Brazil) and was introduced to India, Thailand, Indonesia, Hawaii and the Philippines.

== Description ==
Adults reach a length of about 4.9–5.2 mm (0.19–0.20 in). The head is partly orange yellow in males and dark pitchy brown to black in females. The pronotum is dark purplish blue with bright orange-yellow or reddish-orange anterolateral flanks. The elytra are uniformly dark metallic bluish to purplish blue.

== Life history ==
They have been recorded preying on Aleurodicus dispersus, Aleurothrixus species, Ceratovacuna lanigera, Coccidohystrix insolita, Dysmicoccus neobrevipes, Ferrisia virgata, Nipaecoccus nipae, Heteropsylla cubana and Thrips palmi.
