= Isoclerus =

Scientific classification
- Kingdom: Animalia
- Phylum: Arthropoda
- Class: Insecta
- Order: Coleoptera
- Suborder: Polyphaga
- Infraorder: Cucujiformia
- Family: Thanerocleridae
- Subfamily: Thaneroclerinae
- Genus: Isoclerus; Lewis, 1892

Subgenera
- 4 (see text)

Synonyms
- Prionodera Wolcott, 1910 (homonym); Prionostichaeus Wolcott, 1911; Wolcottella Lucas, 1920; Allothaneroclerus Corporaal, 1939

Genus of beetles

Isoclerus is a genus of beetles in the family Thanerocleridae.

== Subgenera ==
- Ababa Casey, 1897
- Isoclerus Lewis, 1892
- Lyctosoma Lewis, 1892
- Parathaneroclerus Pic, 1936
