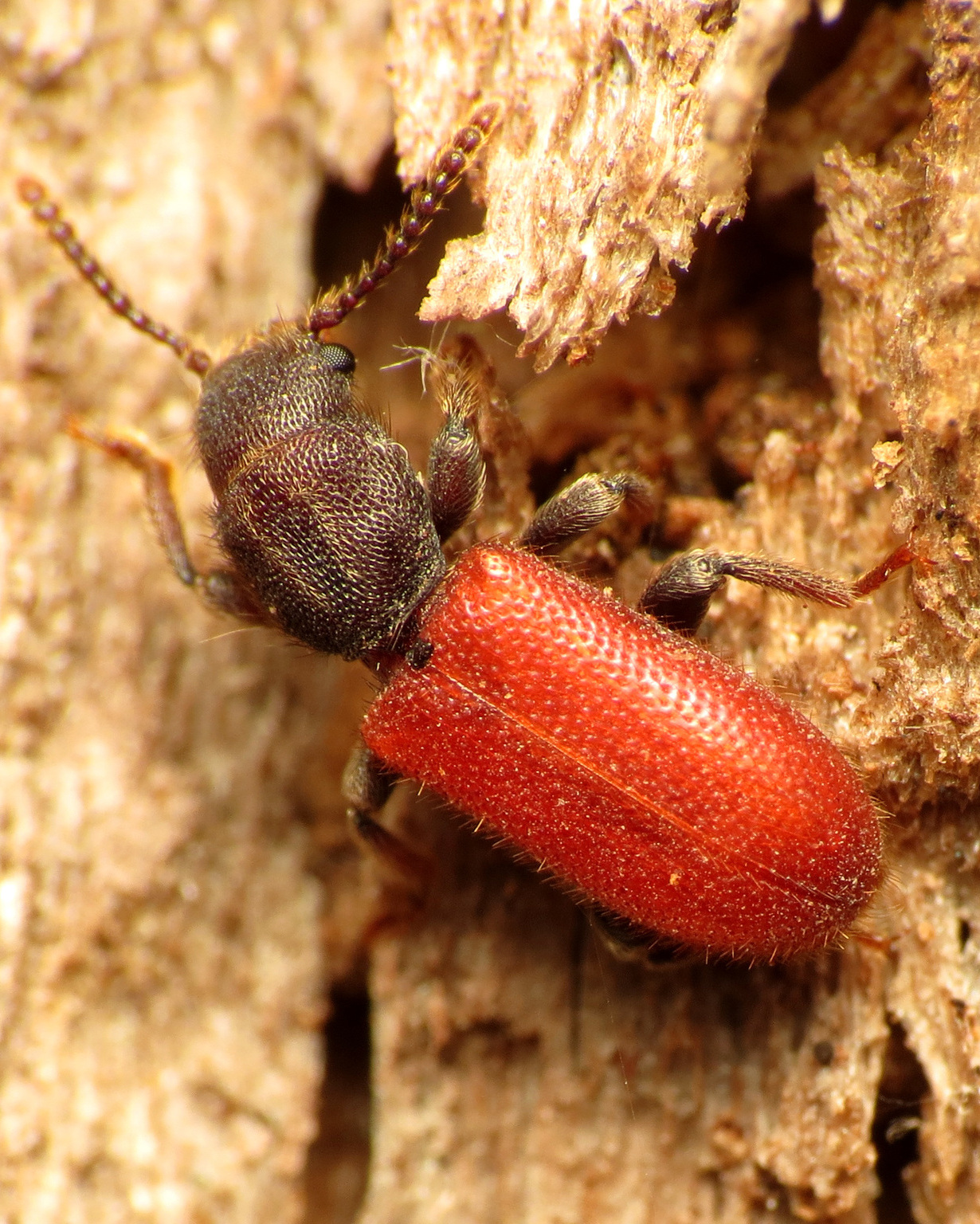
- Specimen of Zenodosus sanguineus observed in Washington D.C.

Scientific classification
- Kingdom: Animalia
- Phylum: Arthropoda
- Clade: Pancrustacea
- Class: Insecta
- Order: Coleoptera
- Suborder: Polyphaga
- Infraorder: Cucujiformia
- Superfamily: Cleroidea
- Family: Thanerocleridae; Chapin, 1924

Subfamilies
- Thaneroclerinae Chapin, 1924; Zenodosinae Kolibáč, 1992

= Thanerocleridae =

Thanerocleridae Temporal range: Cenomanian–Recent

Family of beetles

Thanerocleridae is a family of beetles belonging to the superfamily Cleroidea. It was formerly considered a subfamily of Cleridae, but was recently elevated to the rank of family. The family has 36 living species in 10 genera, which are found globally, mostly in low-latitude tropical regions, though the genus Zenodosus is found in temperate North America. Thaneroclerid species are likely all predatory both in adult and larval stages. They target small fungus and wood associated beetles, and are generally found in places where such beetles are likely to be found, typically tree associated habitats such as under bark, though some species occur in other locations such as termite nests.

== Taxonomy ==
- Thaneroclerinae Chapin, 1924
  - Cleridopsis Champion, 1913
  - Compactoclerus Pic, 1939
  - Cyrtinoclerus Chapin, 1924
  - Isoclerus Lewis, 1892
  - Meprinogenus Kolibáč, 1992
  - Neoclerus Lewis, 1892
  - Onerunka Kolibáč
  - Thaneroclerus Lefebvre, 1838
  - Viticlerus Miyatake
- Zenodosinae Kolibáč, 1992
  - Zenodosus Wolcott, 1910
  - †Archaeozenodosus Yu & Kolibac, 2017 Burmese amber, Myanmar Late Cretaceous (Cenomanian)
  - †Cretozenodosus Cai & Huang, 2018 Burmese amber, Myanmar Cenomanian
  - †Mesozenodosus Tihelka et al., 2020 Charentese amber, France, Cenomanian
  - †Thanerosus Peris & Kolibáč, 2022 Burmese amber, Myanmar Cenomanian
