= Orcus citri =

Scientific classification
- Kingdom: Animalia
- Phylum: Arthropoda
- Clade: Pancrustacea
- Class: Insecta
- Order: Coleoptera
- Suborder: Polyphaga
- Infraorder: Cucujiformia
- Family: Coccinellidae
- Genus: Orcus
- Species: O. citri

Binomial name
- Orcus citri Lea, 1902

Synonyms
- Orcus coxalis Weise, 1917

Species of beetle

Orcus citri is a species of beetle of the family Coccinellidae. It is found in Australia (Queensland).

== Description ==
The elytra are metallic brownish and the pronotum is yellow with a brownish central area.
