= Orcus cordiformis =

Scientific classification
- Kingdom: Animalia
- Phylum: Arthropoda
- Clade: Pancrustacea
- Class: Insecta
- Order: Coleoptera
- Suborder: Polyphaga
- Infraorder: Cucujiformia
- Family: Coccinellidae
- Genus: Orcus
- Species: O. cordiformis

Binomial name
- Orcus cordiformis Laczynski & Tomaszewska, 2009

Species of beetle

Orcus cordiformis is a species of beetle of the family Coccinellidae. It is found in New Guinea.

== Description ==
Adults reach a length of about 5.1–5.7 mm (0.20–0.22 in). The dorsal surface is deep black with a weak bluish metallic sheen. The ventral surface is black or brownish with or without a bluish sheen.

== Etymology ==
The species is named after its heart-shaped body.
