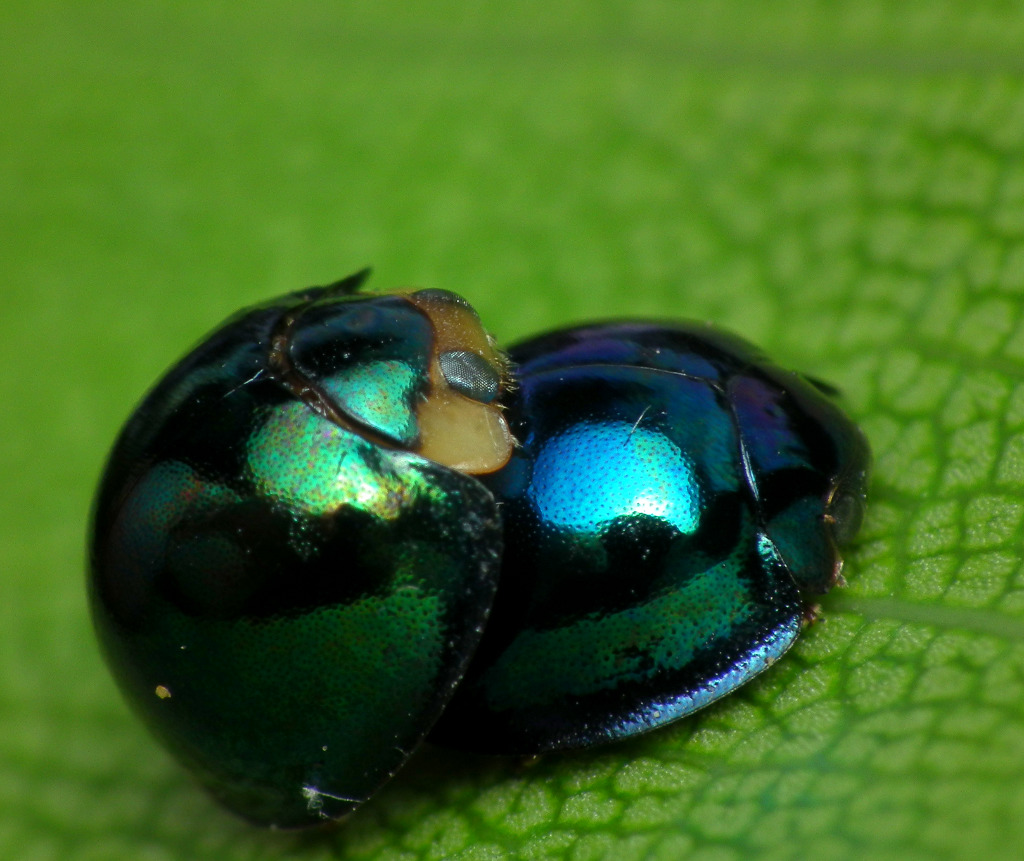
- Halmus chalybeus pair

Scientific classification
- Kingdom: Animalia
- Phylum: Arthropoda
- Clade: Pancrustacea
- Class: Insecta
- Order: Coleoptera
- Suborder: Polyphaga
- Infraorder: Cucujiformia
- Family: Coccinellidae
- Subfamily: Coccinellinae
- Tribe: Chilocorini
- Genus: Halmus; Mulsant, 1850

= Halmus =

Genus of beetles

Halmus is a genus of beetle of the family Coccinellidae.

== Species ==
- Halmus chalybeus (Boisduval, 1835) - steel-blue ladybird
- Halmus coelestris (Blackburn, 1891)
- Halmus cupripennis Weise, 1923
- Halmus evelynensis (Weise, 1923)
- Halmus hilli Ślipiński et Giorgi, 2006
- Halmus viridis Ślipiński et Giorgi, 2006
