= Thaneroclerus =

Scientific classification
- Domain: Eukaryota
- Kingdom: Animalia
- Phylum: Arthropoda
- Class: Insecta
- Order: Coleoptera
- Suborder: Polyphaga
- Infraorder: Cucujiformia
- Family: Thanerocleridae
- Subfamily: Thaneroclerinae
- Genus: Thaneroclerus; Chapin, 1924

Genus of beetles

Thaneroclerus is a genus of checkered beetles in the family Thanerocleridae.

== European Species ==
- Thaneroclerus buquet (Lefebvre, 1835)
