= Zagreus constantini =

Scientific classification
- Kingdom: Animalia
- Phylum: Arthropoda
- Clade: Pancrustacea
- Class: Insecta
- Order: Coleoptera
- Suborder: Polyphaga
- Infraorder: Cucujiformia
- Family: Coccinellidae
- Genus: Zagreus
- Species: Z. constantini

Binomial name
- Zagreus constantini González, 2015

Species of beetle

Zagreus constantini is a species of beetle of the family Coccinellidae. It is found in Ecuador.

== Description ==
Adults reach a length of about 3.4 mm. They have a black head and the pronotum is orange-brown. The elytron is yellowish brown, with five large black spots.
