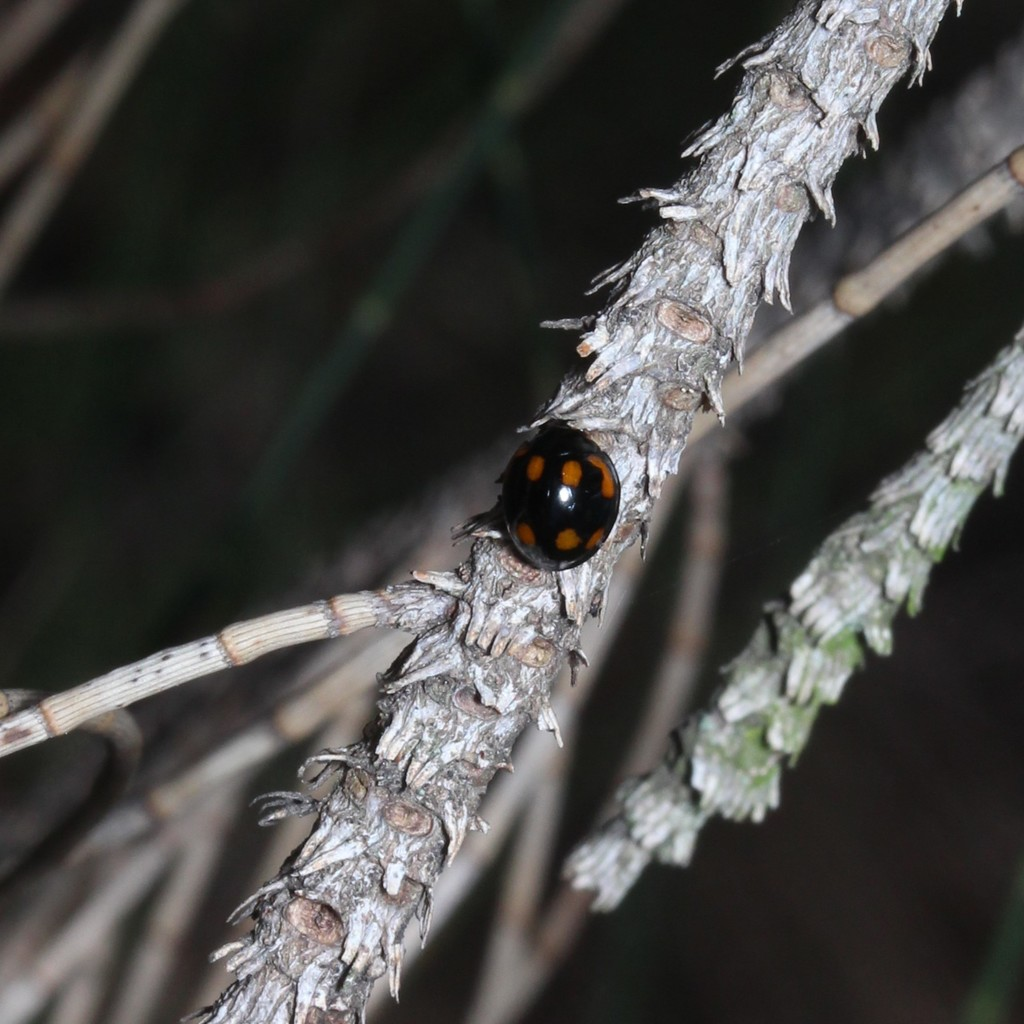

Scientific classification
- Kingdom: Animalia
- Phylum: Arthropoda
- Clade: Pancrustacea
- Class: Insecta
- Order: Coleoptera
- Suborder: Polyphaga
- Infraorder: Cucujiformia
- Family: Coccinellidae
- Genus: Orcus
- Species: O. nummularis

Binomial name
- Orcus nummularis (Boisduval, 1835)

Synonyms
- Coccinella nummularis Boisduval, 1835

= Orcus nummularis =

Species of beetle

Orcus nummularis is a species of beetle of the family Coccinellidae. It is found in Australia (Queensland, New South Wales, Australian Capital Territory).
