= Orcus nigricollis =

Scientific classification
- Kingdom: Animalia
- Phylum: Arthropoda
- Clade: Pancrustacea
- Class: Insecta
- Order: Coleoptera
- Suborder: Polyphaga
- Infraorder: Cucujiformia
- Family: Coccinellidae
- Genus: Orcus
- Species: O. nigricollis

Binomial name
- Orcus nigricollis Weise, 1902

Species of beetle

Orcus nigricollis is a species of beetle of the family Coccinellidae. It is found in New Guinea and on the Kai Islands.

== Description ==
Adults reach a length of about 3–3.3 mm (0.12–0.13 in). The head is pale brown and the pronotum is dark chestnut to blackish with pale brown anterior angles. The elytra are blackish with a blue metallic sheen and pale brown to dark reddish lateral margins.
