= Orcus popperi =

Scientific classification
- Kingdom: Animalia
- Phylum: Arthropoda
- Clade: Pancrustacea
- Class: Insecta
- Order: Coleoptera
- Suborder: Polyphaga
- Infraorder: Cucujiformia
- Family: Coccinellidae
- Genus: Orcus
- Species: O. popperi

Binomial name
- Orcus popperi Laczynski, 2012

Species of beetle

Orcus popperi is a species of beetle of the family Coccinellidae. It is found in Papua New Guinea.

== Description ==
Adults reach a length of about 3.45–3.65 mm (0.136–0.144 in). The head and pronotum are greenish and the antennae blackish. The scutellum is black and the elytra are greenish, but darker along the suture, and with a strong metallic reflection.

== Etymology ==
The species is dedicated to Karl Popper.
