= Arawana arizonica =

Scientific classification
- Kingdom: Animalia
- Phylum: Arthropoda
- Clade: Pancrustacea
- Class: Insecta
- Order: Coleoptera
- Suborder: Polyphaga
- Infraorder: Cucujiformia
- Family: Coccinellidae
- Genus: Arawana
- Species: A. arizonica

Binomial name
- Arawana arizonica (Casey, 1899)

Synonyms
- Exochomus arizonica Casey 1899

Species of beetle

Arawana arizonica is a species of lady beetle in the family Coccinellidae. It is found in North America, where it has been recorded from Arizona.

== Description ==
Adults reach a length of about 3.25-3.50 mm. Adults are black or piceous, the elytron with a red spot.
