= Orcus punctulatus =

Scientific classification
- Kingdom: Animalia
- Phylum: Arthropoda
- Clade: Pancrustacea
- Class: Insecta
- Order: Coleoptera
- Suborder: Polyphaga
- Infraorder: Cucujiformia
- Family: Coccinellidae
- Genus: Orcus
- Species: O. punctulatus

Binomial name
- Orcus punctulatus Blackburn, 1892

Synonyms
- Orcus beneficus Weise, 1912

Species of beetle

Orcus punctulatus is a species of beetle of the family Coccinellidae. It is found in Australia (Queensland) and New Guinea.
