= Arawana scapularis =

Scientific classification
- Kingdom: Animalia
- Phylum: Arthropoda
- Clade: Pancrustacea
- Class: Insecta
- Order: Coleoptera
- Suborder: Polyphaga
- Infraorder: Cucujiformia
- Family: Coccinellidae
- Genus: Arawana
- Species: A. scapularis

Binomial name
- Arawana scapularis (Gorham, 1894)

Synonyms
- Exochomus scapularis Gorham, 1894

Species of beetle

Arawana scapularis is a species of beetle of the family Coccinellidae. It is found in Nicaragua, Costa Rica, Mexico (Jalapa, Vera Cruz, Chiapas, Guerrero, Sinaloa) and the United States (Arizona).

== Description ==
Adults reach a length of about 3.5–4.3 mm (0.14–0.17 in). The elytra are bluish or greenish black with a red spot on the humeral angle and a smaller red or orange spot at the apex.
