= Orcus obscurus =

Scientific classification
- Kingdom: Animalia
- Phylum: Arthropoda
- Clade: Pancrustacea
- Class: Insecta
- Order: Coleoptera
- Suborder: Polyphaga
- Infraorder: Cucujiformia
- Family: Coccinellidae
- Genus: Orcus
- Species: O. obscurus

Binomial name
- Orcus obscurus (Blackburn, 1892)

Synonyms
- Orcus australasiae var. obscurus Blackburn, 1892

Species of beetle

Orcus obscurus is a species of beetle of the family Coccinellidae. It is found in Australia (Western Australia, Queensland).

== Description ==
The dorsal surface is black with three orange maculae on each elytron.
