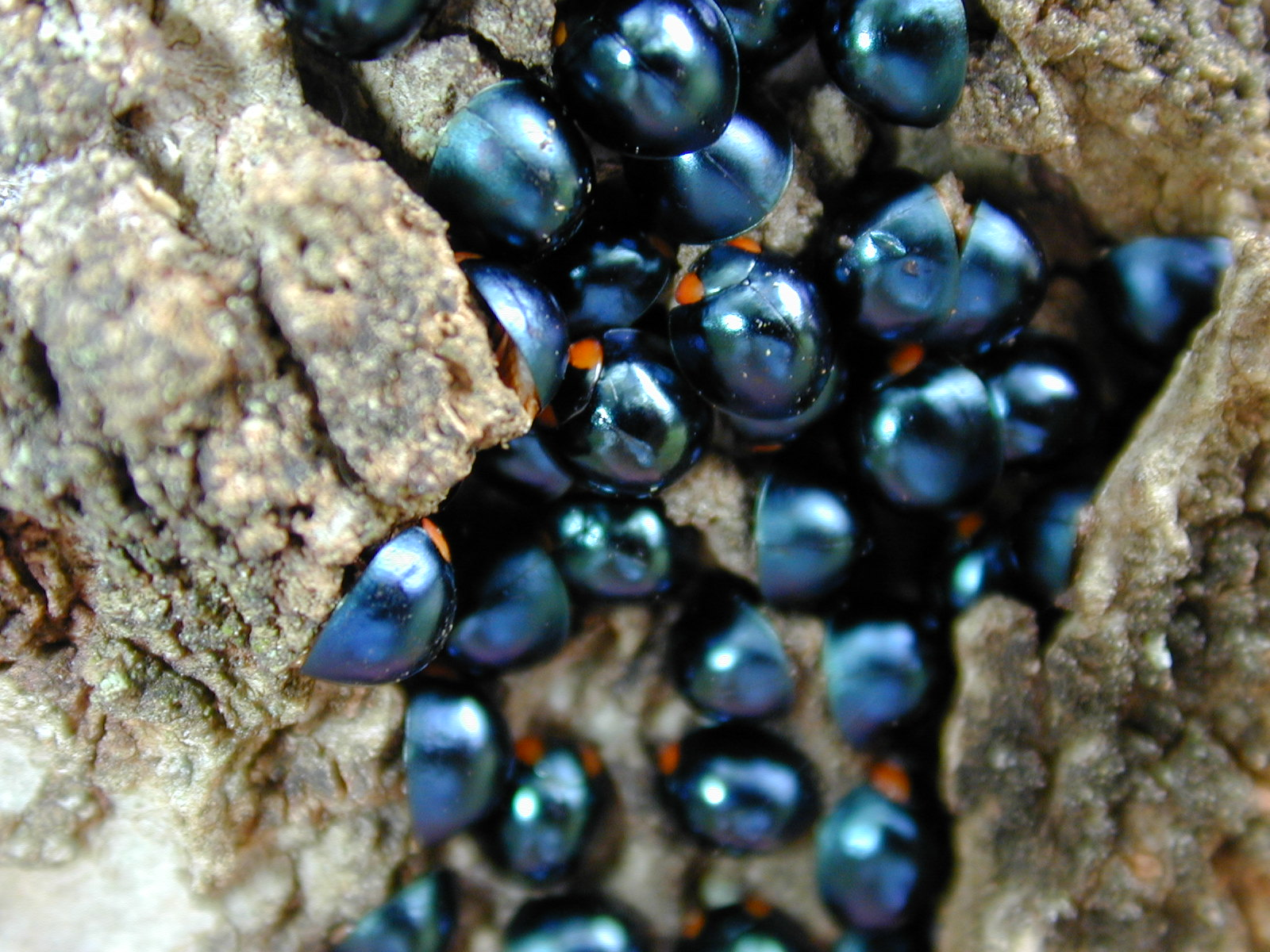
- Adult Curinus coeruleus

Scientific classification
- Kingdom: Animalia
- Phylum: Arthropoda
- Clade: Pancrustacea
- Class: Insecta
- Order: Coleoptera
- Suborder: Polyphaga
- Infraorder: Cucujiformia
- Family: Coccinellidae
- Tribe: Chilocorini
- Genus: Curinus; Mulsant, 1850

= Curinus =

Genus of beetles

Curinus is a genus of beetle of the family Coccinellidae.

== Species ==
- Curinus camboriuensis
- Curinus coeruleus Mulsant, 1850
- Curinus colombianus
- Curinus peleus
