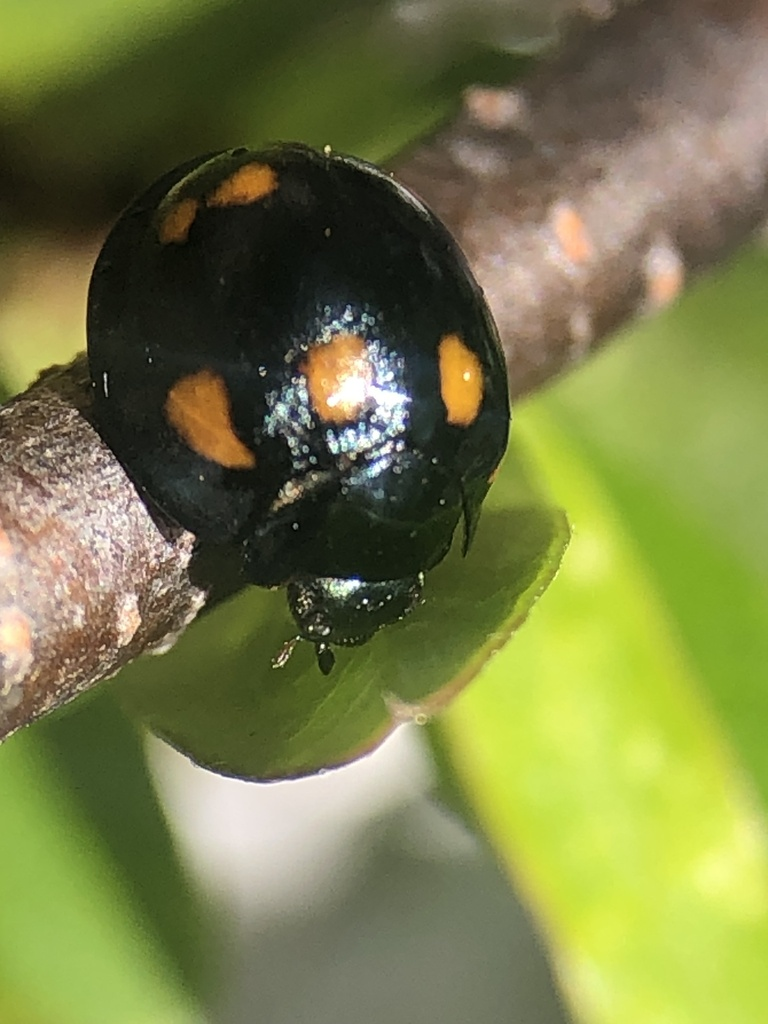

Scientific classification
- Kingdom: Animalia
- Phylum: Arthropoda
- Clade: Pancrustacea
- Class: Insecta
- Order: Coleoptera
- Suborder: Polyphaga
- Infraorder: Cucujiformia
- Family: Coccinellidae
- Genus: Orcus
- Species: O. australasiae

Binomial name
- Orcus australasiae (Boisduval, 1835)

Synonyms
- Coccinella australasiae Boisduval, 1835; Orcus australasiae var. quadrinotatus Lea, 1902

= Orcus australasiae =

Species of beetle

Orcus australasiae is a species of beetle of the family Coccinellidae. It is found in Australia (Western Australia, Queensland, New South Wales, Australian Capital Territory, Tasmania).

== Description ==
The dorsal surface is black with three orange maculae on each elytron.
