= Sicardiana =

Scientific classification
- Kingdom: Animalia
- Phylum: Arthropoda
- Clade: Pancrustacea
- Class: Insecta
- Order: Coleoptera
- Suborder: Polyphaga
- Infraorder: Cucujiformia
- Family: Coccinellidae
- Subfamily: Coccinellinae
- Tribe: Chilocorini
- Genus: Sicardiana; Łączyński & Tomaszewska, 2010
- Species: S. aureomarginata

Binomial name
- Sicardiana aureomarginata Łączyński & Tomaszewska, 2010

Synonyms
- Sicabdiana; Sicabdiana aureomarginata

Genus of beetles

Sicardiana is a genus of beetle of the family Coccinellidae. It is monotypic, being represented by the single species, Sicardiana aureomarginata, which is found in Papua New Guinea.

== Description ==
Adults reach a length of about 2.8–3 mm (0.11–0.12 in). The pronotum is black with orange anterior angles and the elytra are black with orange lateral and apical margins. The ventral surface is dark brownish to black with brownish legs and a brownish abdomen.

== Etymology ==
The genus is dedicated to Dr. Andre Sicard, a French Coleopterist. The species name refers to orange coloration of the lateral margins of the elytra.
