= Endochilus styx =

Scientific classification
- Kingdom: Animalia
- Phylum: Arthropoda
- Clade: Pancrustacea
- Class: Insecta
- Order: Coleoptera
- Suborder: Polyphaga
- Infraorder: Cucujiformia
- Family: Coccinellidae
- Genus: Endochilus
- Species: E. styx

Binomial name
- Endochilus styx Sicard, 1912

Species of beetle

Endochilus styx is a species of beetle of the family Coccinellidae. It is found in São Tomé and Príncipe.

== Description ==
Adults reach a length of about 2.89–3 mm (0.114–0.118 in). The head and pronotum are black and the antennae are dark brownish to blackish. The scutellum and elytra are black. The dorsal surface is mostly glabrous, but the pronotal angles and elytral margins are covered with setae. The ventral surface is black with a brownish abdomen.
