= Chilocorini =

Scientific classification
- Kingdom: Animalia
- Phylum: Arthropoda
- Clade: Pancrustacea
- Class: Insecta
- Order: Coleoptera
- Suborder: Polyphaga
- Infraorder: Cucujiformia
- Family: Coccinellidae
- Subfamily: Coccinellinae
- Tribe: Chilocorini; Mulsant, 1846

Tribe of beetles

The Chilocorini are a tribe of insects within the family Coccinellidae.

== Genera ==
- Arawana
- Axion
- Brumoides
- Chapinaria
- Chilocorus
- Chujochilus
- Cladis
- Curinus
- Endochilus
- Exochomus
- Halmus
- Harpasus
- Hypoceras
- Orcus
- Parexochomus
- Priscibrumus
- Renius
- Sicardiana
- Trichorcus
- Xanthocorus
- Zagreus
