= Zagreus modestus =

Scientific classification
- Kingdom: Animalia
- Phylum: Arthropoda
- Clade: Pancrustacea
- Class: Insecta
- Order: Coleoptera
- Suborder: Polyphaga
- Infraorder: Cucujiformia
- Family: Coccinellidae
- Genus: Zagreus
- Species: Z. modestus

Binomial name
- Zagreus modestus González, 2015

Species of beetle

Zagreus modestus is a species of beetle of the family Coccinellidae. It is found in Ecuador.

== Description ==
Adults reach a length of about 2.8 mm. They have an orange-brown body. The elytron has five small black spots.
