= Endochilus cavifrons =

Scientific classification
- Kingdom: Animalia
- Phylum: Arthropoda
- Clade: Pancrustacea
- Class: Insecta
- Order: Coleoptera
- Suborder: Polyphaga
- Infraorder: Cucujiformia
- Family: Coccinellidae
- Genus: Endochilus
- Species: E. cavifrons

Binomial name
- Endochilus cavifrons Weise, 1898

Species of beetle

Endochilus cavifrons is a species of beetle of the family Coccinellidae. It is found in Cameroon.

== Description ==
Adults reach a length of about 5.9–6.1 mm (0.23–0.24 in). The head and pronotum are black and the antennae are brownish. The scutellum is black and the elytra are bright red, with the bases, apices and lateral margins black. The dorsal surface is mostly glabrous, but the pronotum, base of the elytra and margins are covered with setae. The ventral surface is dark red to brown.
