= Orcus quadrimaculatus =

Scientific classification
- Kingdom: Animalia
- Phylum: Arthropoda
- Clade: Pancrustacea
- Class: Insecta
- Order: Coleoptera
- Suborder: Polyphaga
- Infraorder: Cucujiformia
- Family: Coccinellidae
- Genus: Orcus
- Species: O. quadrimaculatus

Binomial name
- Orcus quadrimaculatus Gadeau de Kerville, 1884

Species of beetle

Orcus quadrimaculatus is a species of beetle of the family Coccinellidae. It is found in Australia (New South Wales).

== Description ==
The elytra are black, each with two orange maculae.
