= Orcus janthinus =

Scientific classification
- Kingdom: Animalia
- Phylum: Arthropoda
- Clade: Pancrustacea
- Class: Insecta
- Order: Coleoptera
- Suborder: Polyphaga
- Infraorder: Cucujiformia
- Family: Coccinellidae
- Genus: Orcus
- Species: O. janthinus

Binomial name
- Orcus janthinus Mulsant, 1850

Species of beetle

Orcus janthinus is a species of beetle of the family Coccinellidae. It is found in Indonesia (Java, Sumba) and New Guinea.

== Description ==
Adults reach a length of about 5.5–7 mm (0.22–0.28 in). The head, pronotum and elytra are black with a blue and/or purple metallic sheen. The ventral surface is mostly dark brown to pale brown.
