= Endochilus compater =

Scientific classification
- Kingdom: Animalia
- Phylum: Arthropoda
- Clade: Pancrustacea
- Class: Insecta
- Order: Coleoptera
- Suborder: Polyphaga
- Infraorder: Cucujiformia
- Family: Coccinellidae
- Genus: Endochilus
- Species: E. compater

Binomial name
- Endochilus compater Weise, 1910

Species of beetle

Endochilus compater is a species of beetle of the family Coccinellidae. It is found in Cameroon.

== Description ==
Adults reach a length of about 5.3–5.6 mm (0.21–0.22 in). The head and pronotum are black and the antennae are brownish. The scutellum is black and the elytra are bright red with black margins. The dorsal surface is mostly glabrous, but the pronotum and margins of the elytra are covered with setae. The ventral surface is dark red to dark brown.
