= Endochilus brunneocinctus =

Scientific classification
- Kingdom: Animalia
- Phylum: Arthropoda
- Clade: Pancrustacea
- Class: Insecta
- Order: Coleoptera
- Suborder: Polyphaga
- Infraorder: Cucujiformia
- Family: Coccinellidae
- Genus: Endochilus
- Species: E. brunneocinctus

Binomial name
- Endochilus brunneocinctus Sicard, 1930

Species of beetle

Endochilus brunneocinctus is a species of beetle of the family Coccinellidae. It is found in Cameroon, Gabon and the Democratic Republic of the Congo.

== Description ==
Adults reach a length of about 3.8–4 mm (0.15–0.16 in). The head and pronotum are blackish and the antennae are brownish. The scutellum is dark red, while the elytra are mostly dark red. The dorsal surface is glabrous except for the pronotal angles and elytral margins which are covered with some short setae. The ventral surface is dark red to dark brown.
