= Brumoides andamanensis =

Scientific classification
- Kingdom: Animalia
- Phylum: Arthropoda
- Clade: Pancrustacea
- Class: Insecta
- Order: Coleoptera
- Suborder: Polyphaga
- Infraorder: Cucujiformia
- Family: Coccinellidae
- Genus: Brumoides
- Species: B. andamanensis

Binomial name
- Brumoides andamanensis Poorani, 2023

Species of beetle

Brumoides andamanensis is a species of beetle of the family Coccinellidae. It is found in India (Andaman Islands).

== Description ==
Adults reach a length of about 2.2–2.8 mm (0.087–0.110 in). The head is black in females and yellow and black in males. The pronotum has an hourglass-shaped median macula.

== Life history ==
They have been recorded preying on Aspidiotus destructor.

== Etymology ==
The species name is derived from the type locality.
