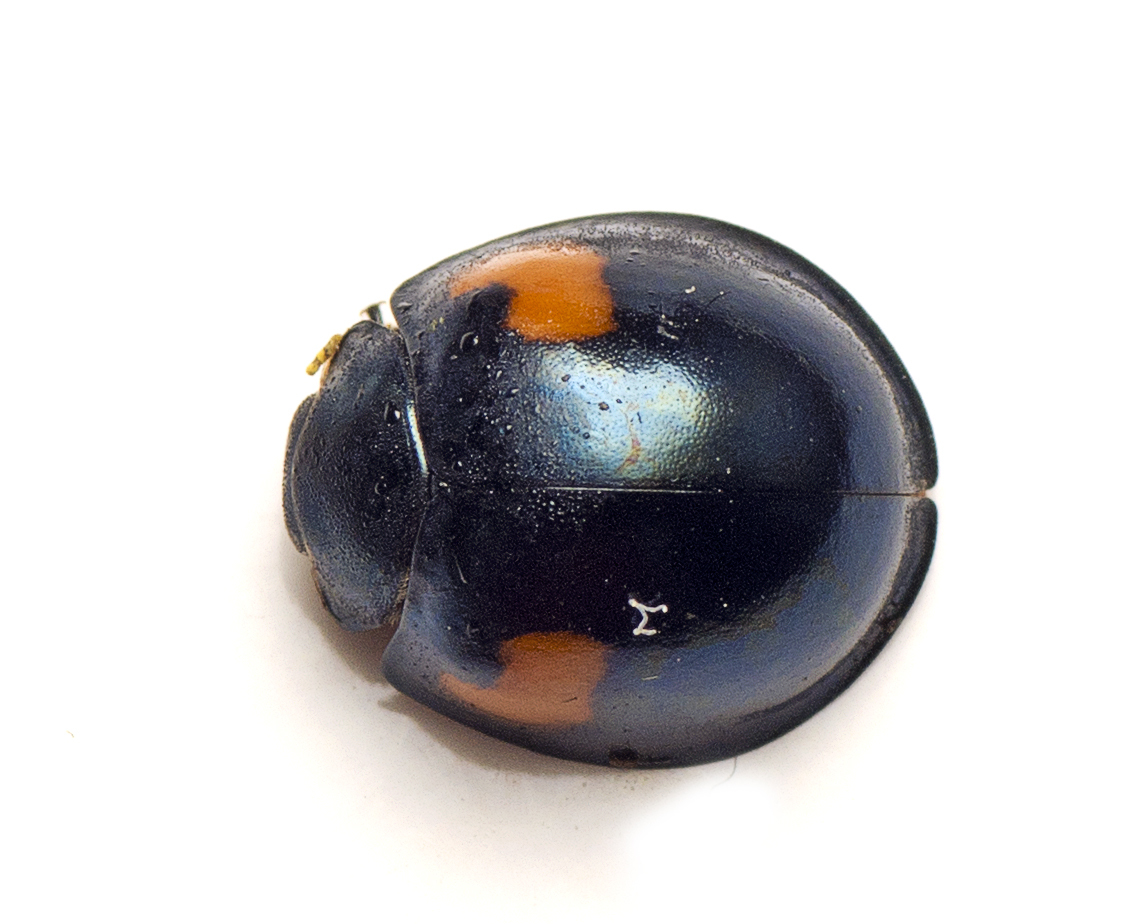

Scientific classification
- Kingdom: Animalia
- Phylum: Arthropoda
- Clade: Pancrustacea
- Class: Insecta
- Order: Coleoptera
- Suborder: Polyphaga
- Infraorder: Cucujiformia
- Family: Coccinellidae
- Genus: Orcus
- Species: O. bilunulatus

Binomial name
- Orcus bilunulatus (Boisduval, 1835)

Synonyms
- Coccinella bilunulata Boisduval, 1835

= Orcus bilunulatus =

Species of beetle

Orcus bilunulatus is a species of beetle of the family Coccinellidae. It is found in Australia (Queensland, Australian Capital Territory, Tasmania).

== Description ==
The elytra are black, each with one prebasal orange macula.
