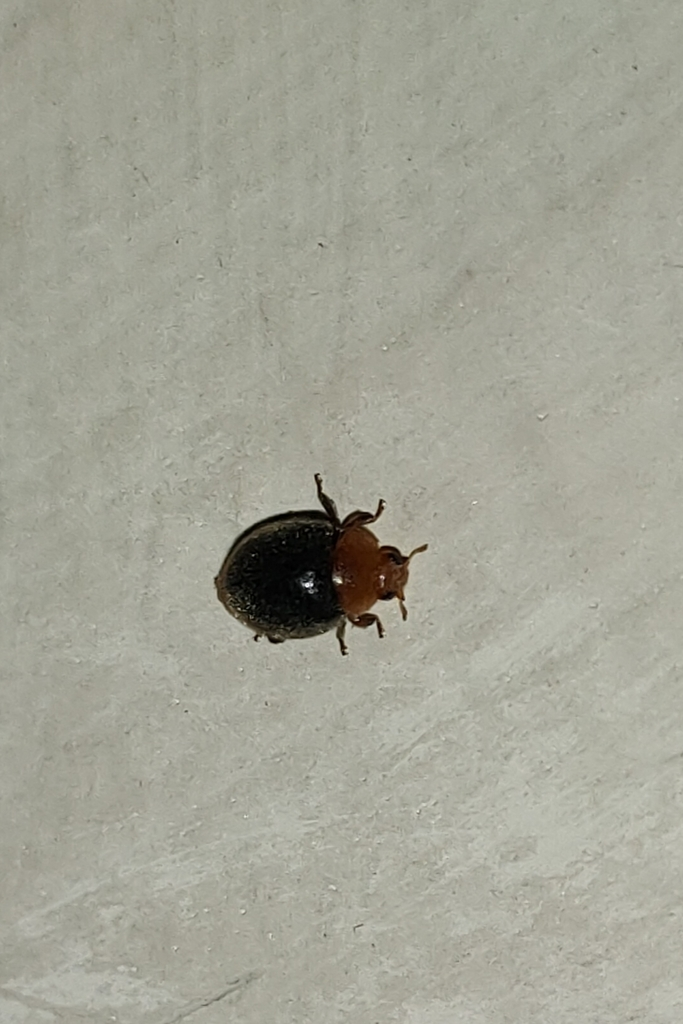

Scientific classification
- Kingdom: Animalia
- Phylum: Arthropoda
- Clade: Pancrustacea
- Class: Insecta
- Order: Coleoptera
- Suborder: Polyphaga
- Infraorder: Cucujiformia
- Family: Coccinellidae
- Genus: Parexochomus
- Species: P. pubescens

Binomial name
- Parexochomus pubescens (Küster, 1848)

Synonyms
- Exochomus pubescens Küster, 1848; Platynaspis flavilabris Motschulsky, 1849; Exochomus lugubrivestis Mulsant, 1853; Exochomus gestroi Fairmaire, 1875; Exochomus apicatus Fairmaire, 1884; Exochomus saharae Sicard, 1929; Exochomus pubescens var. circumcinctus Sahlberg, 1903

= Parexochomus pubescens =

Species of beetle

Parexochomus pubescens is a species of beetle of the family Coccinellidae. It is found in India (Haryana, New Delhi, Uttar Pradesh), Pakistan, Afghanistan, Syria, Palestine, Iran, Israel, Saudi Arabia, Egypt, Algeria, Libya, Morocco, Tunisia, Spain, Greece, France and Italy.

== Description ==
Adults reach a length of about 2.5–2.8 mm (0.098–0.110 in). The head and pronotum are yellowish brown, the latter slightly fuscous in the middle or with a distinct black median macula. The elytra are dark brown to black.

== Life history ==
They have been recorded preying on Parlatoria species, Bemisia tabaci and Tetranychus turkmenicus.
