= Parexochomus =

Scientific classification
- Kingdom: Animalia
- Phylum: Arthropoda
- Clade: Pancrustacea
- Class: Insecta
- Order: Coleoptera
- Suborder: Polyphaga
- Infraorder: Cucujiformia
- Family: Coccinellidae
- Subfamily: Coccinellinae
- Tribe: Chilocorini
- Genus: Parexochomus; Barovsky, 1922

Genus of beetles

Parexochomus is a genus of beetles of the family Coccinellidae.

== Species ==
- Parexochomus bellus (Wollaston, 1864)
- Parexochomus melanocephalus (Zoubkoff, 1833)
- Parexochomus nigripennis (Erichson, 1843)
- Parexochomus nigromaculatus (Goeze, 1777)
- Parexochomus oligotrichus Li & Ren, 2016
- Parexochomus pubescens (Küster, 1848)
- Parexochomus quadriplagiatus (Wollaston, 1864)
- Parexochomus semenowi (Weise, 1887)
- Parexochomus sjoestedti (Weise, 1909)
- Parexochomus troberti (Mulsant, 1850)
- Parexochomus wraniki (Fürsch, 1989)
