= Steel blue =

Color

Steel Blue

Color coordinates
- Hex triplet: #4682B4
- sRGB^{B} (r, g, b): (70, 130, 180)
- HSV (h, s, v): (207°, 61%, 71%)
- CIELCh_{uv} (L, C, h): (52, 54, 243°)
- Source: X11
- ISCC–NBS descriptor: Moderate blue
- B: Normalized to [0–255] (byte)

Steel blue is a shade of blue color that resembles blue steel, i.e., steel which has been subjected to bluing for protection from rust. It is one of the less vibrant shades of blue, and is usually identified as a blue-gray color. An archaic term for it is chalybeous.

The first recorded use of steel blue as a color name in English was in 1817.

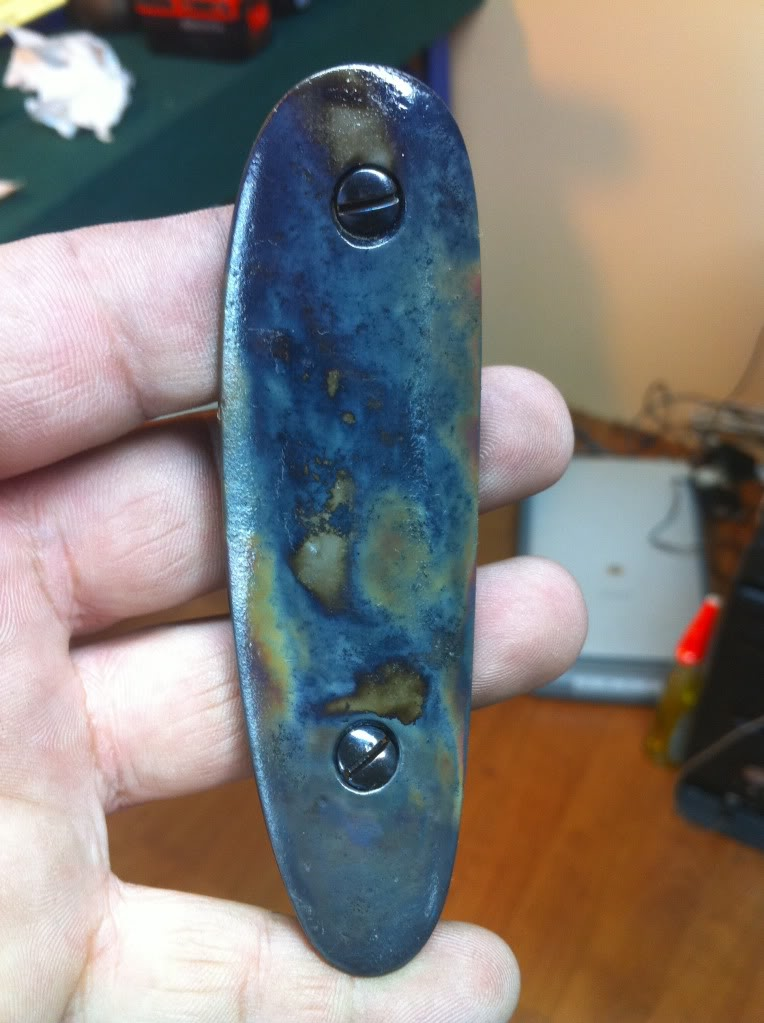
Blue steel

In 1987, Steel blue was included as one of the X11 colors, later also known as the X11 web colors after the invention of the World Wide Web in 1991.

== Variations of steel blue ==
=== Light steel blue ===
Light Steel Blue

Color coordinates
- Hex triplet: #B0C4DE
- sRGB^{B} (r, g, b): (176, 196, 222)
- HSV (h, s, v): (214°, 21%, 87%)
- CIELCh_{uv} (L, C, h): (78, 26, 243°)
- Source: X11
- ISCC–NBS descriptor: Pale blue
- B: Normalized to [0–255] (byte)

At right is displayed the web color light steel blue, a light tint of steel blue.

=== Steel blue (Crayola) ===
Steel Blue (Crayola)

Color coordinates
- Hex triplet: #0081AB
- sRGB^{B} (r, g, b): (0, 129, 171)
- HSV (h, s, v): (195°, 100%, 67%)
- CIELCh_{uv} (L, C, h): (50, 56, 232°)
- Source: Crayola
- B: Normalized to [0–255] (byte)

At right is displayed the color that is called "steel blue" in Crayola crayons. Steel blue has been a Crayola Metallic FX color since 2001.

== Steel blue in nature ==
=== Beetles ===
- The Steel blue lady beetle

=== Fish ===
- In Siamese fighting fish the steel blue color comes from being homozygous for a single gene.
- The Steel-blue Aphyosemion

=== Birds ===
- Steel-blue whydah
- Steel-blue flycatcher

== Steel blue in culture ==
Sports

- The Houston Texans, National Football League team includes deep steel blue as one of its three colors (along with "liberty white" and "battle red").
- The Lehigh Valley IronPigs, the AAA affiliate of the Philadelphia Phillies baseball team, includes steel blue as one of its three colors.
- The Colorado Avalanche of the National Hockey League use steel blue as a secondary color on their burgundy uniforms.
- The Steel Blue Oval is a sports stadium in Bassendean, Western Australia.

== See also ==
- RAL 5011 Steel blue
- List of colors
