= Orcus viridulus =

Scientific classification
- Kingdom: Animalia
- Phylum: Arthropoda
- Clade: Pancrustacea
- Class: Insecta
- Order: Coleoptera
- Suborder: Polyphaga
- Infraorder: Cucujiformia
- Family: Coccinellidae
- Genus: Orcus
- Species: O. viridulus

Binomial name
- Orcus viridulus Laczynski & Tomaszewska, 2009

Species of beetle

Orcus viridulus is a species of beetle of the family Coccinellidae. It is found in Papua New Guinea.

== Description ==
Adults reach a length of about 5.6–8 mm (0.22–0.31 in). The dorsal surface is black with a strong metallic sheen, which is greenish on the head, bluish and greenish on the pronotum and greenish and purple on the elytra. The ventral surface is metallic dark green to bluish.

== Etymology ==
The species name is derived from Latin viridulus (meaning greenish) and refers to the greenish coloration of the species.
