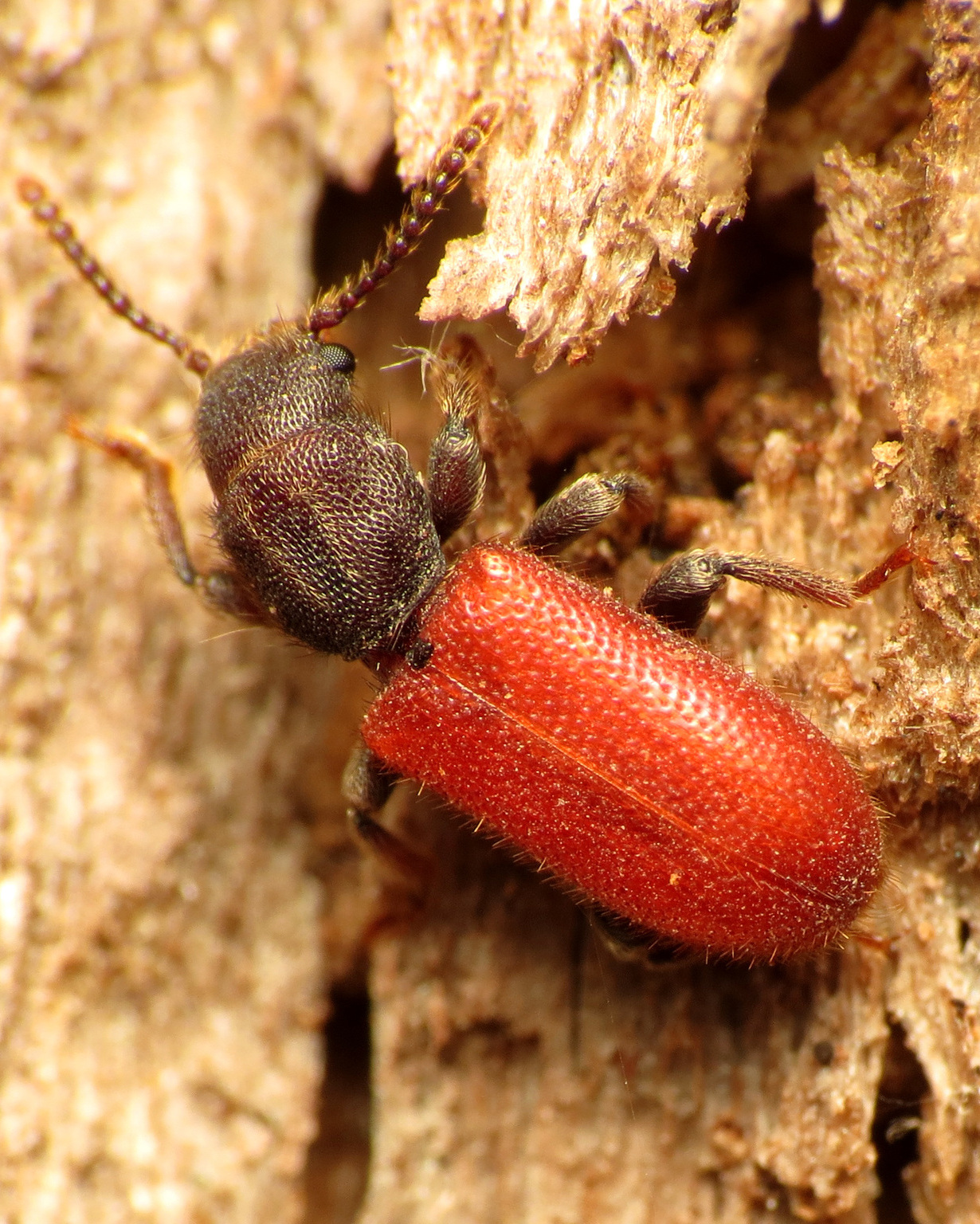

Scientific classification
- Kingdom: Animalia
- Phylum: Arthropoda
- Class: Insecta
- Order: Coleoptera
- Suborder: Polyphaga
- Infraorder: Cucujiformia
- Family: Thanerocleridae
- Subfamily: Zenodosinae
- Genus: Zenodosus; Wolcott, 1910

= Zenodosus =

Genus of beetles

Zenodosus is a genus of beetles in the family Thanerocleridae. There is at least one described species in Zenodosus, Z. sanguineus. It is native to North America.
