= Orcus frommi =

Scientific classification
- Kingdom: Animalia
- Phylum: Arthropoda
- Clade: Pancrustacea
- Class: Insecta
- Order: Coleoptera
- Suborder: Polyphaga
- Infraorder: Cucujiformia
- Family: Coccinellidae
- Genus: Orcus
- Species: O. frommi

Binomial name
- Orcus frommi Laczynski, 2012

Species of beetle

Orcus frommi is a species of beetle of the family Coccinellidae. It is found in Papua New Guinea.

== Description ==
Adults reach a length of about 2.98–3.05 mm (0.117–0.120 in). The head is black with pale brown antennae, and the pronotum is blackish with yellowish anterior angles and lateral margins. The scutellum is black and the elytra have a strong metallic reflection, which is mostly greenish, but with a purple line just inside the yellow elytral margins.

== Etymology ==
The species is dedicated to the twentieth century humanistic philosopher Erich Fromm.
