= Arawana darieli =

Scientific classification
- Kingdom: Animalia
- Phylum: Arthropoda
- Clade: Pancrustacea
- Class: Insecta
- Order: Coleoptera
- Suborder: Polyphaga
- Infraorder: Cucujiformia
- Family: Coccinellidae
- Genus: Arawana
- Species: A. darieli

Binomial name
- Arawana darieli Rodríguez-Vélez, Chan-Canche & Sandoval-Cauich, 2024

Species of beetle

Arawana darieli is a species of beetle of the family Coccinellidae. It is found in Mexico (Yucatán).

== Description ==
Adults reach a length of about 3 mm (0.12 in). The head and antennae are yellowish-brown. The pronotum is yellowish-brown with a central dark brown spot. The scutellum is black and the elytra have a dark brown spot and yellowish-brown lateral margins.

== Etymology ==
The species name corresponds to the Hebrew name Dariel which is the given name of the first author's son.
