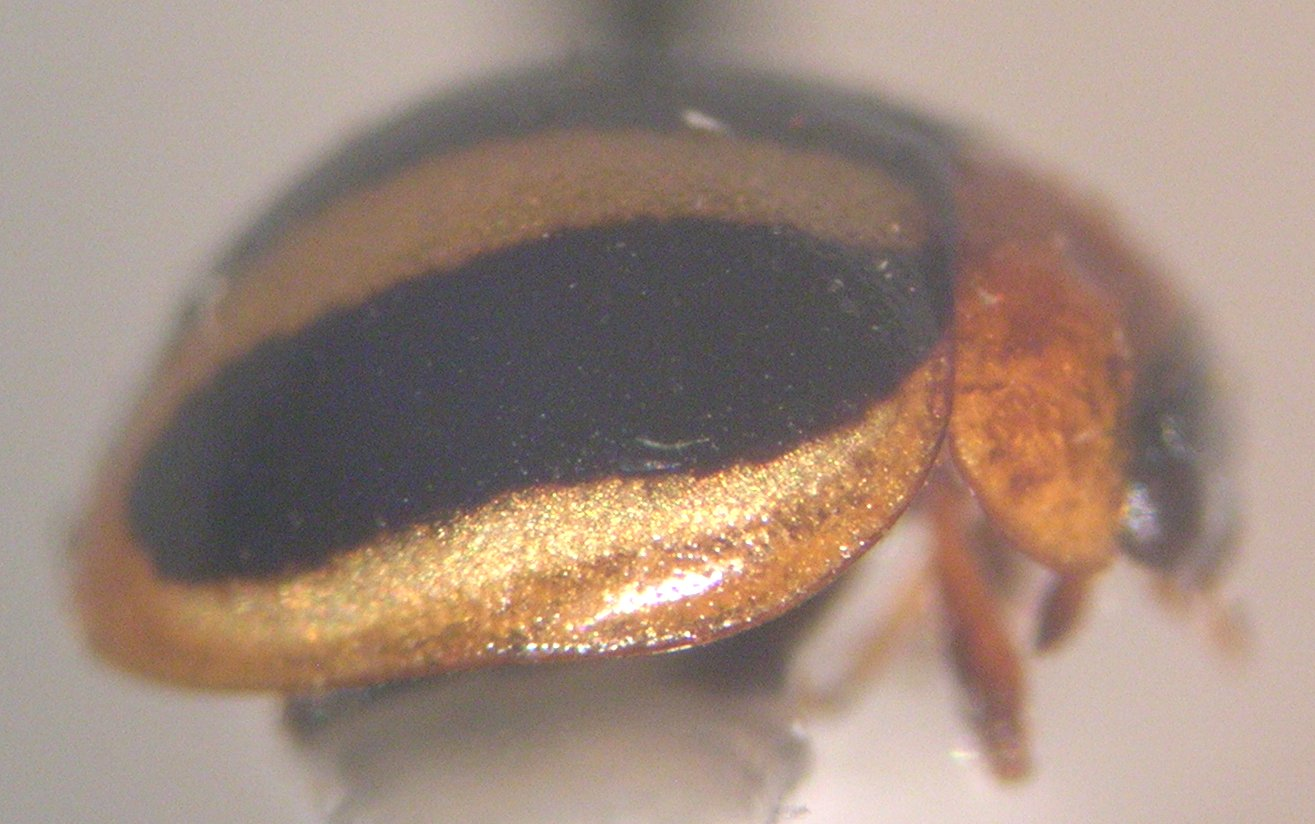

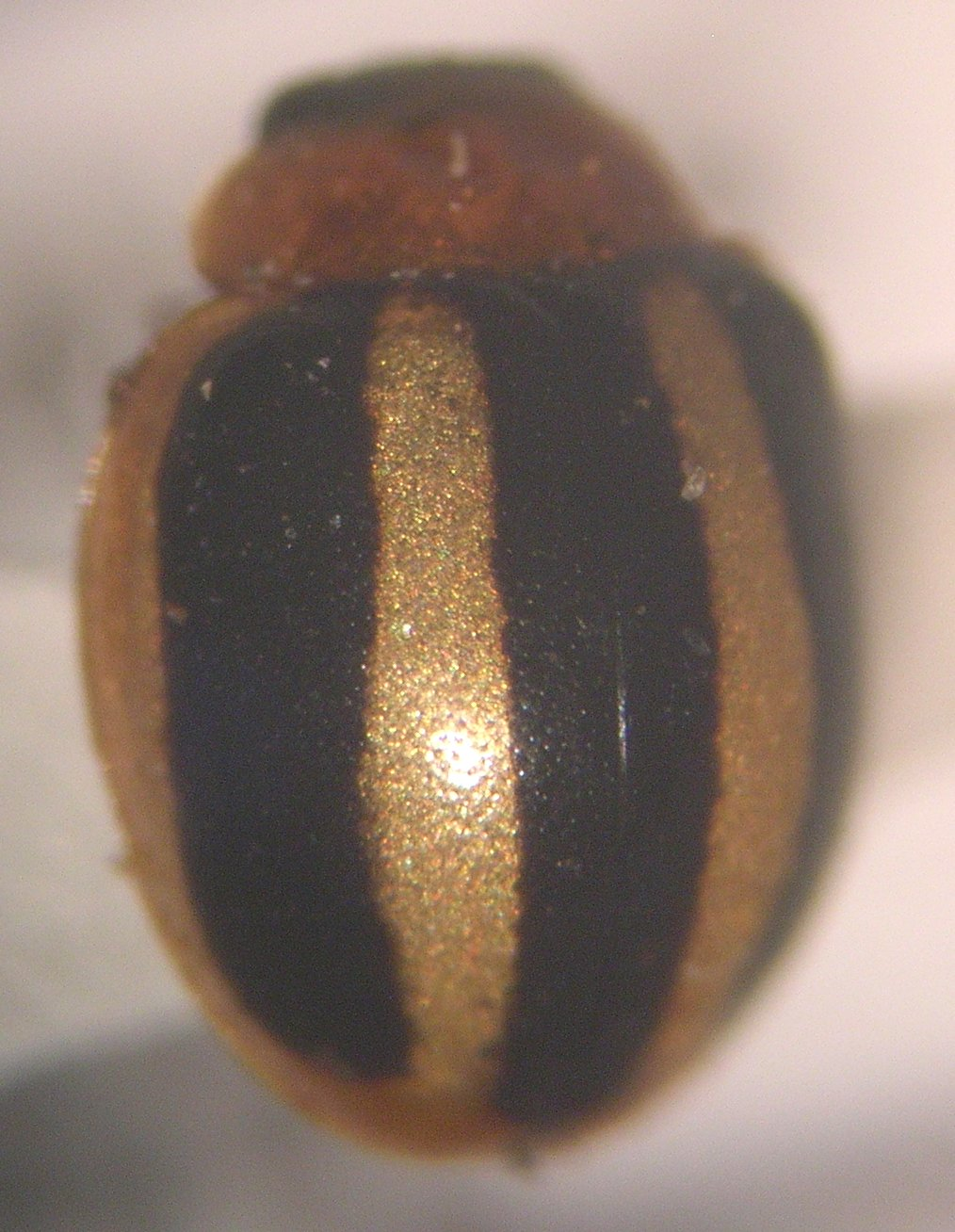

Conservation status
- Least Concern (IUCN 2.3)

Scientific classification
- Kingdom: Animalia
- Phylum: Arthropoda
- Clade: Pancrustacea
- Class: Insecta
- Order: Coleoptera
- Suborder: Polyphaga
- Infraorder: Cucujiformia
- Family: Coccinellidae
- Genus: Brumoides
- Species: B. suturalis

Binomial name
- Brumoides suturalis (Fabricius, 1789)

Synonyms
- Brumus suturalis (Fabricius, 1798); Coccinella suturalis Fabricius, 1798; Brumus daldorfii Crotch, 1874; Brumoides kolhapurensis Sathe & Bhosale, 2002

= Brumoides suturalis =

Species of beetle

Brumoides suturalis, the three-striped lady-beetle, is a species of ladybird described by Johan Christian Fabricius in 1789. It is found in India, Pakistan, Bangladesh, Sri Lanka, Bhutan, Nepal, Indonesia, Philippines and Papua New Guinea.

== Description ==
Adults reach a length of about 3.5–3.8 mm (0.14–0.15 in). Adults are small and ovate. Head and thorax are brown. Eyes are black. Elytra yellowish white with two black stripes. One strip runs down the trailing edge, whereas the other stripe runs the middle of each elytron. Pronotum brownish anterio-laterally and creamy in the center. Scutellum and ventrum brownish.

== Biology ==
Adult female lays egg cluster of 2 to 20.within shingle-like crevices made by overlapping leaves in curled leaves, or sometimes at the junction of leaf and stem. Eggs are yellowish with orange tinge. Larva undergo four instars. Newly hatched instar is smoky grey and fuzzy. With each moult, body becomes more elongated with spiny projections over the body.

It is known to feed on wide variety of aphids: Aphis craccivora, Aphis gossypii, Brevicoryne brassicae, Lipaphis erysimi, Myzus persicae, Hyadaphis coriandri, Hysteroneura setariae, Ropalosiphum maidis, Therioaphis trifolii, Macrosiphum granarium, Schizaphis graminum, Phenacoccus solenopsis, Ferrisia virigata, Drosicha mangiferae, Amrasca devastans, Amrasca biguttula, Bemisia tabaci, Tetranychus atlanticus, Adelges joshii, Aonidiella auranti, Aonidiella citrina, Aonidiella orientalis, Aspidiotus destructor, Hemiberiesia latanias, Leucaspis coniferarum, Parlatoria, Pinnaspis strachani, Quadraspidiotus perniciosus, Ferrisia virgata, Phthorimaea operculella, Planococcus pacificus, Acyrthosiphon pisum and Tecaspis.
