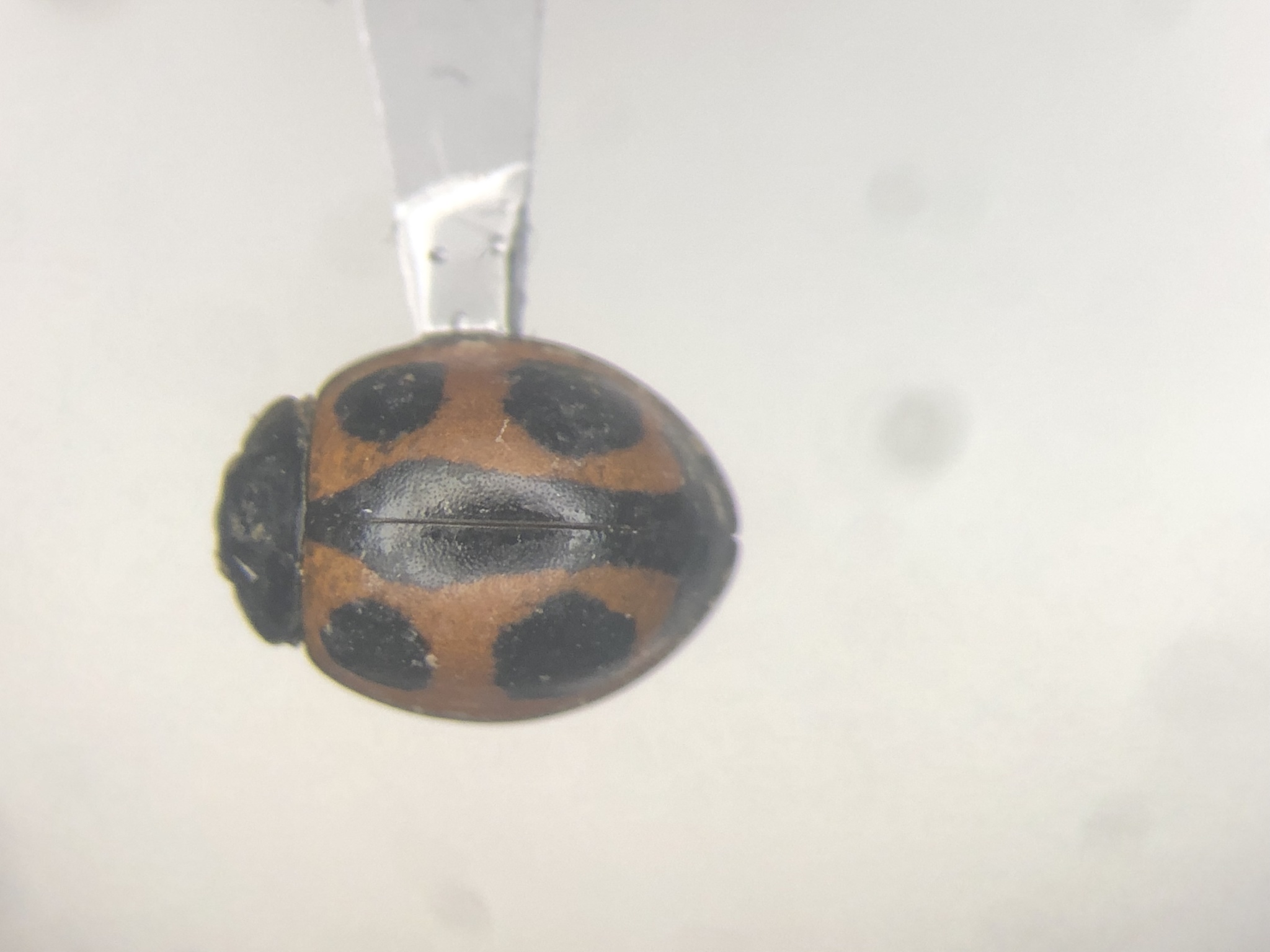

Scientific classification
- Kingdom: Animalia
- Phylum: Arthropoda
- Clade: Pancrustacea
- Class: Insecta
- Order: Coleoptera
- Suborder: Polyphaga
- Infraorder: Cucujiformia
- Family: Coccinellidae
- Genus: Brumoides
- Species: B. septentrionis

Binomial name
- Brumoides septentrionis (Weise, 1885)

Synonyms
- Brumus septentrionis Weise, 1885; Brumus septentrionis var. davisi Leng, 1908; Exochomus hoegei Gorham, 1894; Exochomus orbiculatus Leng, 1908; Exochomus ovoideus Casey, 1899; Exochomus desertorum Casey, 1899; Brumus septentrionis var. nevadensis Leng, 1908

= Brumoides septentrionis =

Species of beetle

Brumoides septentrionis is a species of lady beetle in the family Coccinellidae. It is found in North America.

== Description ==
Adults reach a length of about 2.9-3 mm. Adults are black, but the background colour of the elytron is yellowish brown to red.

== Subspecies ==
These three subspecies belong to the species Brumoides septentrionis:

- Brumoides septentrionis davisi (Leng, 1908) (southeastern Canada to Virginia, west to Minnesota)
- Brumoides septentrionis hogei (Gorham, 1894) (Mexico and from Colorado to western Texas, west to Idaho and Arizona)
- Brumoides septentrionis septentrionis (Weise, 1885) (Hudson Bay to northern Arizona, west to Alaska and northern California)
