= Orcus cyanocephalus =

Scientific classification
- Kingdom: Animalia
- Phylum: Arthropoda
- Clade: Pancrustacea
- Class: Insecta
- Order: Coleoptera
- Suborder: Polyphaga
- Infraorder: Cucujiformia
- Family: Coccinellidae
- Genus: Orcus
- Species: O. cyanocephalus

Binomial name
- Orcus cyanocephalus Mulsant, 1850

Synonyms
- Orcus lecanii Blackburn, 1895; Orcus purpureotinctus Lea, 1902

Species of beetle

Orcus cyanocephalus is a species of beetle of the family Coccinellidae. It is found in Australia (Western Australia, Northern Territory, Queensland) and New Guinea.

== Description ==
The elytra are black with a weak bluish, purple or greenish sheen.
