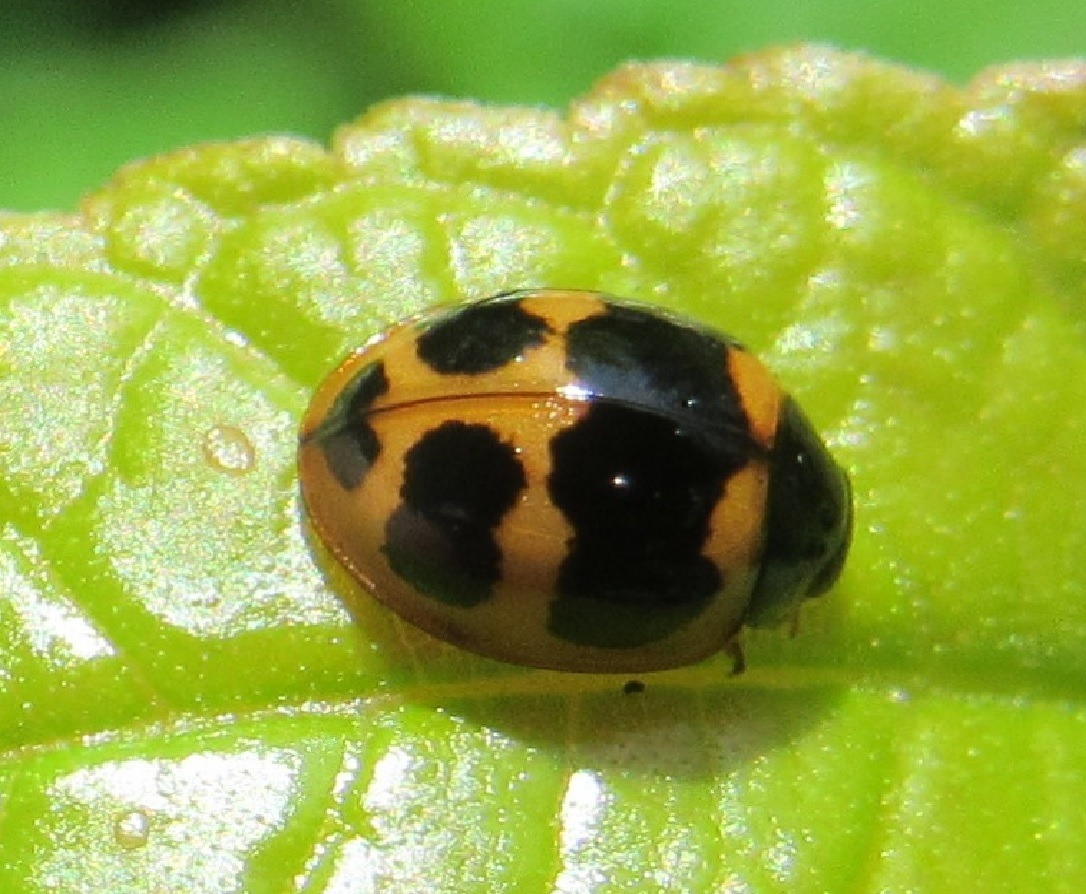
- Zagreus cornejoi

Scientific classification
- Kingdom: Animalia
- Phylum: Arthropoda
- Clade: Pancrustacea
- Class: Insecta
- Order: Coleoptera
- Suborder: Polyphaga
- Infraorder: Cucujiformia
- Family: Coccinellidae
- Subfamily: Coccinellinae
- Tribe: Chilocorini
- Genus: Zagreus; Mulsant, 1850

= Zagreus (beetle) =

Genus of beetles

Zagreus is a genus of beetles in the family Coccinellidae.

== Species ==
The following species are recognised in the genus Zagreus:

- Zagreus adelae
- Zagreus bimaculosus
- Zagreus bistillatus
- Zagreus carlosi
- Zagreus constantini
- Zagreus cornejoi
- Zagreus costalimai
- Zagreus decempunctatus
- Zagreus dieguezi
- Zagreus guttatus
- Zagreus hexasticta
- Zagreus jordani
- Zagreus kondoi
- Zagreus modestus
- Zagreus ritchiei
- Zagreus similatus
- Zagreus subcoeruleus
- Zagreus tetraspilus
- Zagreus westerduijni
