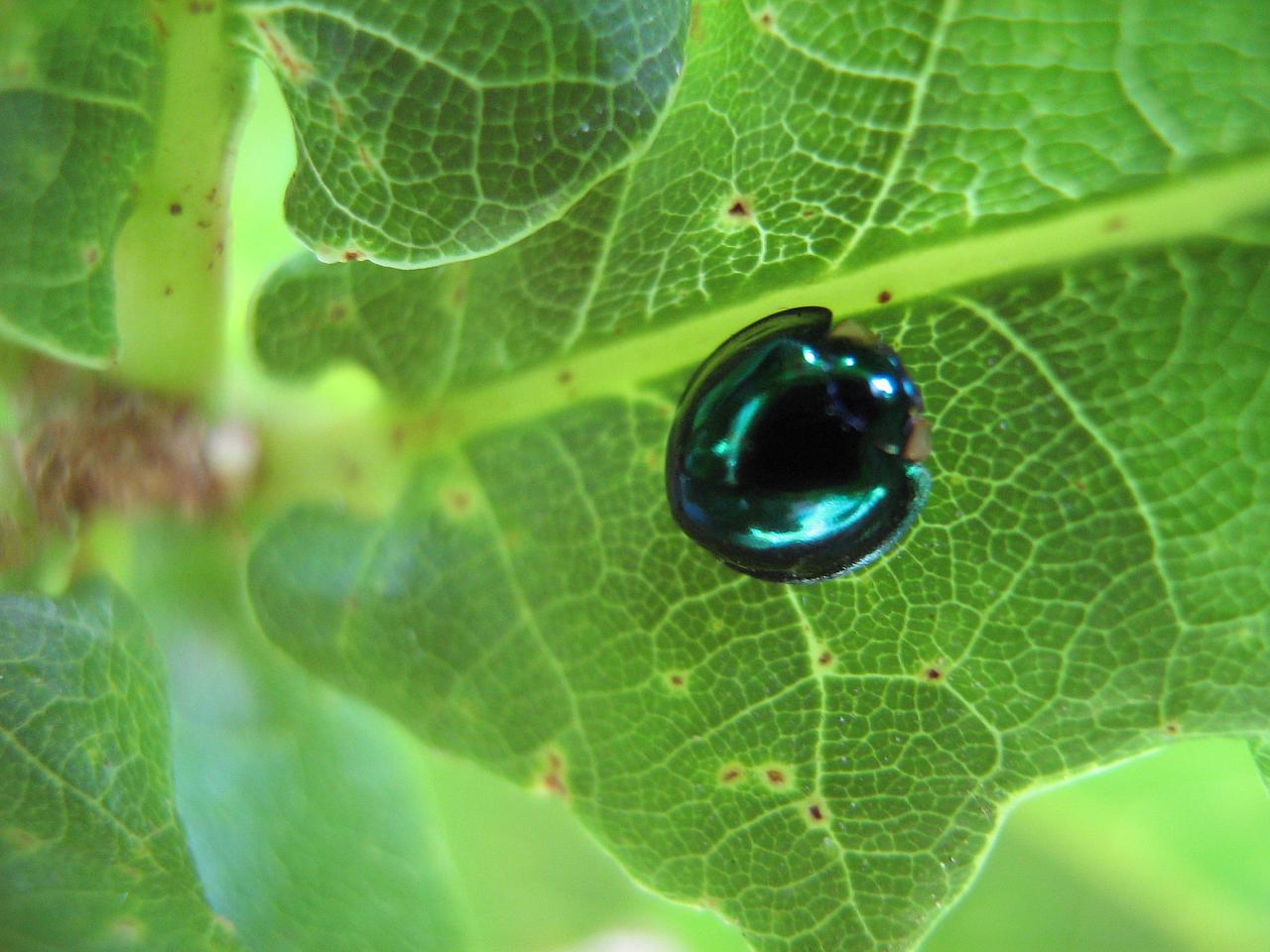
- On an oak leaf

Scientific classification
- Kingdom: Animalia
- Phylum: Arthropoda
- Clade: Pancrustacea
- Class: Insecta
- Order: Coleoptera
- Suborder: Polyphaga
- Infraorder: Cucujiformia
- Family: Coccinellidae
- Genus: Halmus
- Species: H. chalybeus

Binomial name
- Halmus chalybeus (Boisduval, 1835)

Synonyms
- Coccinella chalybea Boisduval, 1835

= Halmus chalybeus =

Species of beetle

Halmus chalybeus, commonly known as the steelblue ladybird, is a species of ladybird in the beetle family Coccinellidae and the genus Halmus that is native to Australia. Adult and larval steelblue ladybirds eat a variety of small insects, including but not limited to scale insects, psyllids, whitefly and free living gall mites (Eriophyoidea).

== Appearance ==
Halmus chalybeus has a rounded appearance with an iridescent blue/green colouration. It is a predator of other insects. It was introduced to New Zealand from Australia in 1899 and 1905 to control black scale and blue gum scale (see scale insect) on citrus trees, where it is now common in northern regions. It has also been recorded eating San Jose scale. They are about 3–4 mm long.

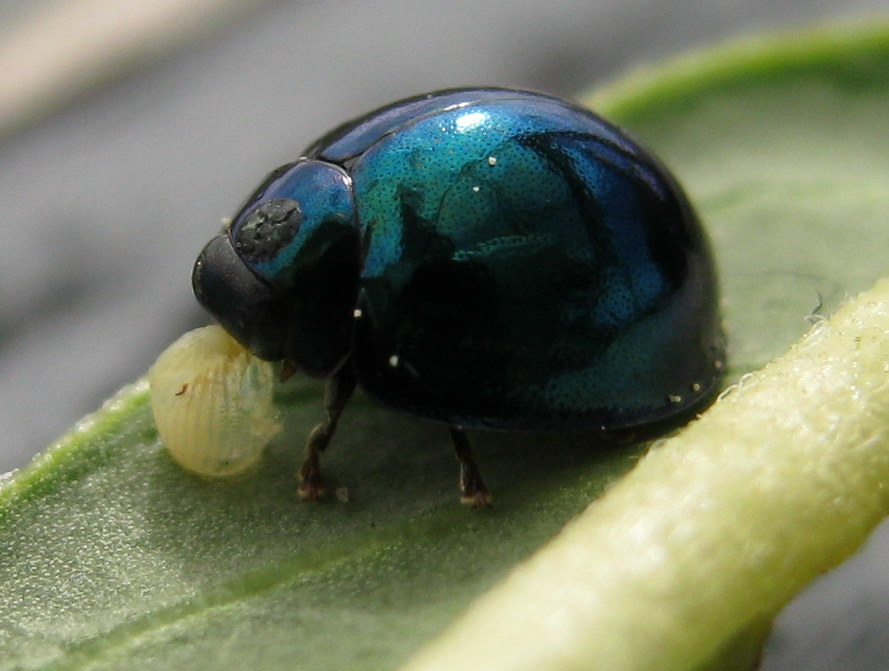
Eating the egg of a monarch butterfly

== See also ==
- Harmonia conformis, the large spotted ladybird
- Illeis galbula, the fungus-eating ladybird
- Two-spotted lady beetle
