= Edward Albert Chapin =

American entomologist

- Born: 1894
- Died: 1969 (aged 74–75)
- Known for: Leading authority on beetles
- Scientific career
- Fields: Entomology

Edward Albert Chapin (1894-1969) was an American entomologist employed by the USDA's Bureau of Entomology and Plant Quarantine, who served as Associate Curator of Insects in the National Museum of Natural History, 1934-1954. He was a specialist on scarab beetles (Scarabaeidae), and erected the genus Brumoides in 1965.
