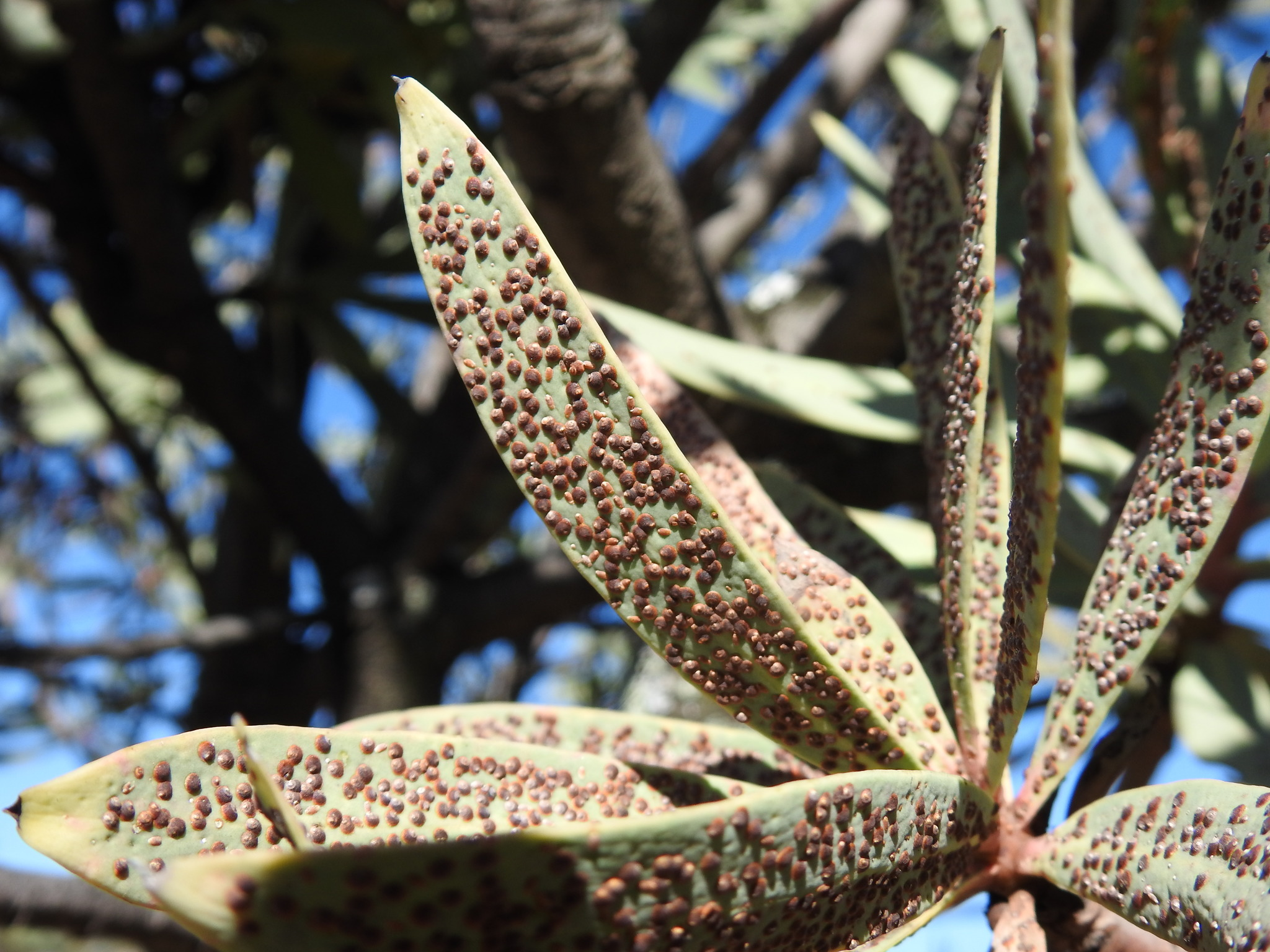
- Furcaspis proteae, South Africa

Scientific classification
- Domain: Eukaryota
- Kingdom: Animalia
- Phylum: Arthropoda
- Class: Insecta
- Order: Hemiptera
- Suborder: Sternorrhyncha
- Family: Diaspididae
- Subfamily: Furcaspidinae
- Genus: Furcaspis; Lindinger, 1908

= Furcaspis =

Genus of scale insects

Furcaspis is a genus in the armored scale insect family Diaspididae, the only genus in the subfamily Furcaspidinae. There are about 30 described species in Furcaspis.

== Species ==
These 30 species belong to the genus Furcaspis:

- Furcaspis aequatorialis Williams & Miller, 2006 (Ecuador)
- Furcaspis andamanensis (Green, 1926) (Andaman Islands)
- Furcaspis biformis (Cockerell, 1893) (widespread)
- Furcaspis bromeliae Hempel, 1932 (Brazil)
- Furcaspis capensis (Walker, 1852) (Africa)
- Furcaspis charmoyi Brain, 1918 (Mauritius, South Africa)
- Furcaspis cladii (Maskell, 1891) (Japan, Australia, Mauritius)
- Furcaspis costulariae Hardy & Williams, 2018 (New Caledonia)
- Furcaspis cyphokentiae (Williams & Miller, 2006) (New Caledonia)
- Furcaspis dominicae Williams & Miller, 2006 (Dominica)
- Furcaspis douglorum Okusu & Normark, 2014 (Panama)
- Furcaspis exophthalma Williams & Miller, 2006 (Papua New Guinea)
- Furcaspis glandulosa Williams & Miller, 2006 (Venezuela)
- Furcaspis haematochroa Cockerell, 1919 (Philippines)
- Furcaspis intercepta Williams & Miller, 2006 (Brazil)
- Furcaspis matileae Williams & Miller, 2006 (New Caledonia)
- Furcaspis mauritiana (Newstead, 1917) (Mauritius)
- Furcaspis mexicana Williams & Miller, 2006 (Mexico)
- Furcaspis oaxacae Williams & Miller, 2006 (Mexico)
- Furcaspis oceanica Lindinger, 1909 (Pacific Islands)
- Furcaspis palmaria Williams & Miller, 2006 (Belize, Guatemala, Mexico)
- Furcaspis paxilliloba Williams & Miller, 2006 (Guatemala, Mexico)
- Furcaspis peruviana Williams & Miller, 2006 (Peru)
- Furcaspis plana Hempel, 1937 (Brazil)
- Furcaspis proteae Brain, 1918 (South Africa)
- Furcaspis rufa Lindinger, 1913 (Réunion)
- Furcaspis scleroprymna Williams & Miller, 2006 (Puerto Rico)
- Furcaspis sibuyanensis Williams & Miller, 2006 (Philippines))
- Furcaspis taquarae (Fonseca, 1969) (Brazil)
- Furcaspis tasmanica Williams & Miller, 2006 (Australia)
