= List of Coccinellidae genera =

The family Coccinellidae ("ladybirds", "lady beetles", or "lady bugs") is divided into seven subfamilies, many tribes, and about 360 genera:

== Subfamily Chilocorinae ==
=== Tribe Chilocorini ===
Chilocorini – Species:Chilocorini

- Anisorcus
- Arawana
- Axion
- Brumoides
- Brumus
- Chapinaria
- Chilocorus
- Cladis
- Curinus
- Egius
- Endochilus
- Exochomus
- Halmus
- Harpasus
- Orcus
- Phaenochilus
- Priscibrumus
- Sicardiana
- Simmondsius
- Trichorcus
- Xanthocorus
- Zagreus

=== Tribe Platynaspidini ===
- Boschalis
- Crypticolus
- Phymatosternus
- Platynaspidius
- Platynaspis

=== Tribe Telsimiini ===
- Hypocyrema
- Telsimia

== Subfamily Coccidulinae ==
=== Tribe Azyini ===
- Azya
- Pseudoazya

=== Tribe Coccidulini ===
- Adoxellus
- Auladoria
- Botynella
- Bucolinus
- Bucolus
- Bura
- Coccidula
- Cranoryssus
- Cryptolaemus
- Empia
- Erithionyx
- Epipleuria
- Eupalea
- Eupaleoides
- Geodimmockius
- Hazisia
- Hypoceras
- Microrhizobius
- Nothocolus
- Nothorhyzobius
- Orbipressus
- Orynipus
- Paracranoryssus
- Psorolyma
- Rhyzobius
- Rodatus
- Scymnodes
- Stenadalia
- Stenococcus
- Syntona

=== Tribe Cranophorini ===
- Cranophorus
- Hoangus

=== Tribe Exoplectrini ===
- Ambrocharis
- Anisorhizobius
- Aulis
- Chapinula
- Chnoodes
- Coeliaria
- Cyrtaulis
- Dioria
- Exoplectra
- Gordonita
- Incurvus
- Neorhizobius
- Neoryssomus
- Novaulis
- Oridia
- Peralda
- Rhizoryssomus
- Sicardinus
- Sidonis
- Siola
- Sumnius

=== Tribe Lithophilini ===
- Lithophilus

=== Tribe Monocorynini ===
- Mimolithophilus
- Monocoryna

=== Tribe Oryssomini ===
- Oryssomus
- Pseudoryssomus

=== Tribe Poriini ===
- Poria

== Subfamily Coccinellinae ==
=== Tribe Brachiacanthini ===
- Brachiacantha
- Cyra
- Cyrea
- Hinda

=== Tribe Coccinellini ===
- Aaages
- Adalia
- Aiolocaria
- Alloneda
- Anatis
- Anisolemnia
- Anisosticta
- Antineda
- Anegleis
- Aphidecta
- Archegleis
- Australoneda
- Autotela
- Bothrocalvia
- Callicaria
- Calvia
- Cheilomenes
- Chelonitis
- Chloroneda
- Cirocolla
- Cleobora
- Clynis
- Coccinella
- Coccinula
- Coelophora
- Coleomegilla
- Cycloneda
- Declivitata
- Docimocaria
- Dysis
- Egleis
- Eoadalia
- Eoanemia
- Eriopis
- Erythroneda
- Eumegilla
- Harmonia
- Heterocaria
- Heteroneda
- Hippodamia
- Hysia
- Illeis
- Lemnia
- Lioadalia
- Macronaemia
- Megalocaria
- Megillina
- Micraspis
- Microcaria
- Microneda
- Mononeda
- Mulsantina
- Myrrha
- Myzia
- Naemia
- Neda
- Nedina
- Neocalvia
- Neoharmonia
- Nesis
- Oenopia
- Oiocaria
- Olla
- Oxytella
- Palaeoneda
- Paranaemia
- Phrynolemnia
- Procula
- Propylea
- Pseudadonia
- Pseudoenopia
- Sospita
- Sphaeroneda
- Spiloneda
- Synona
- Synonycha
- Xanthadalia

=== Tribe Discotomini ===
- Discotoma
- Euseladia
- Pristonema
- Seladia
- Vodella

=== Tribe Halyziini ===
- Eothea
- Halyzia
- Macroilleis
- Metamyrrha
- Neohalyzia
- Oxytella
- Protothea
- Psyllobora
- Vibidia

=== Tribe Singhikalini ===
- Singhikalia

=== Tribe Tytthaspidini ===
- Bulaea
- Isora
- Tytthaspis

== Subfamily Epilachninae ==
=== Tribe Epilachnini ===
- Adira
- Afidenta
- Afidentula
- Afissa
- Afissula
- Afilachna
- Chazeauiana
- Chnootriba
- Diekeana
- Epilachna
- Henosepilachna
- Macrolasia
- Papuaepilachna
- Solanophila
- Subafissa
- Subcoccinella
- Toxotoma
- Uniparodentata

=== Tribe Epivertini ===
- Epiverta

=== Tribe Eremochilini ===
- Eremochilus

=== Tribe Madaini ===
- Cynegetis
- Damatula
- Figura
- Lorma
- Mada
- Malata
- Megatela
- Merma
- Pseudodira
- Tropha

== Subfamily Ortaliinae ==
=== Tribe Noviini ===
- Novius

=== Tribe Ortaliini ===
- Amida
- Amidellus
- Anortalia
- Azoria
- Elnidortalia
- Ortalia
- Ortalistes
- Paramida
- Rhynchortalia
- Scymnhova
- Zenoria

== Subfamily Scymninae ==
=== Tribe Aspidimerini ===
- Acarinus
- Aspidimerus
- Cryptogonus
- Pseudaspidimerus

=== Tribe Cryptognathini ===
- Cryptognatha

=== Tribe Diomini ===
- Andrzej
- Decadiomus
- Dichaina
- Diomus
- Heterodiomus
- Moiradiomus

=== Tribe Hyperaspidini ===
- Blaisdelliana
- Corystes
- Erratodiomus
- Helesius
- Hyperaspidius
- Hyperaspis
- Magnodiomus
- Mimoscymnus
- Planorbata
- Thalassa
- Tiphysa

=== Tribe Pentiliini ===
- Calloeneis
- Curticornis
- Pentilia

=== Tribe Scymnini ===
- Acoccidula
- Aponephus
- Apseudoscymnus
- Axinoscymnus
- Clitostethus
- Cycloscymnus
- Cyrema
- Depressoscymnus
- Didion
- Geminosipho
- Horniolus
- Keiscymnus
- Leptoscymnus
- Midus
- Nephus
- Parascymnus
- Parasidis
- Propiptus
- Sasajiscymnus
- Scymniscus
- Scymnobius
- Scymnomorpha
- Scymnus
- Sidis
- Veronicobius

=== Tribe Scymnillini ===
- Viridigloba
- Zagloba
- Zilus

=== Tribe Selvadiini ===
- Selvadius

=== Tribe Stethorini ===
- Stethorus
- Parastethorus

== Subfamily Sticholotidinae ==
=== Tribe Argentipilosini ===
- Argentipilosa

=== Tribe Carinodulini ===
- Carinodula
- Carinodulina
- Carinodulinka

=== Tribe Cephaloscymnini ===
- Aneaporia
- Cephaloscymnus
- Neaporia
- Prodilis
- Prodiloides

=== Tribe Limnichopharini ===
- Limnichopharus

=== Tribe Microweiseini ===
- Coccidophilus
- Cryptoweisea
- Dichaina
- Diloponis
- Gnathoweisea
- Microcapillata
- Microfreudea
- Microweisea
- Nipus
- Pseudosmilia
- Sarapidus
- Stictospilus

=== Tribe Plotinini ===
- Ballida
- Buprestodera
- Catanaplotina
- Haemoplotina
- Paraplotina
- Plotina
- Protoplotina
- Sphaeroplotina

=== Tribe Serangiini ===
- Catana
- Catanella
- Delphastus
- Microserangium
- Serangiella
- Serangium

=== Tribe Shirozuellini ===
- Ghanius
- Medamatento
- Promecopharus
- Sasajiella
- Shirozuella

=== Tribe Sticholotidini ===
- Boschalis
- Bucolellus
- Chilocorellus
- Coelolotis
- Coelopterus
- Filipinolotis
- Glomerella
- Habrolotis
- Hemipharus
- Jauravia
- Lenasa
- Lotis
- Mimoserangium
- Neaptera
- Nelasa
- Neojauravia
- Neotina
- Nesina
- Nesolotis
- Nexophallus
- Paracoelopterus
- Parajauravia
- Paranelasa
- Paranesolotis
- Parinesa
- Pharopsis
- Pharoscymnus
- Phlyctenolotis
- Semiviride
- Sticholotis
- Stictobura
- Sulcolotis
- Synonychimorpha
- Trimallena
- Xamerpillus
- Xanthorcus
- Xestolotis

=== Tribe Sukunahikonini ===
- Hikonasukuna
- Orculus
- Paraphellus
