= Hysiae =

Hysiae or Hysiai (Ὑσιαί) or Hysia (Ὑσία) may refer to:

- Hysia (Arcadia), a town of ancient Arcadia, Greece
- Hysiae (Argolis), a garrison town in Greece southwest of Argos, where two battle were fought:
  - Battle of Hysiae (c. 669 BC)
  - Battle of Hysiae (417 BC)
- Hysiae (Boeotia), a village in Boeotia, was not far from Plataea and is mentioned by Thucydides
- Hysia (beetle), a genus of ladybird in family Coccinellidae
