= Nobuotentou =

Scientific classification
- Kingdom: Animalia
- Phylum: Arthropoda
- Clade: Pancrustacea
- Class: Insecta
- Order: Coleoptera
- Suborder: Polyphaga
- Infraorder: Cucujiformia
- Family: Coccinellidae
- Subfamily: Coccinellinae
- Tribe: Coccinellini
- Genus: Nobuotentou; Kitano, 2020
- Species: N. shirozui

Binomial name
- Nobuotentou shirozui (Sasaji, 1982)

Synonyms
- Propylea shirozui Sasaji, 1982; Phrynocaria shirozui

Genus of beetles

Nobuotentou is a genus of beetle of the family Coccinellidae. It is monotypic, being represented by the single species, Nobuotentou shirozui, which is found in Taiwan.

== Description ==
Adults reach a length of about 7.1–7.9 mm (0.28–0.31 in). The head is yellowish and the pronotum is yellowish with a central black macula. The elytra are yellowish with a round black macula. The legs are yellowish brown.

== Taxonomy ==
Propylea shirozui was placed in the monotypic genus Nobuotentou by Kitano in 2020. In a revision of the Chinese species of the genus Phrynocaria published in 2026, this move was not mentioned, and the species was retained in Phrynocaria without further explanation.
