= Sospita =

Sospita may refer to

- Juno Sospita, an aspect of the Roman goddess Juno
- Sospita (beetle), a genus of ladybird beetle
- Abisara, a genus of butterflies in the family Riodinidae

== See also ==
- Spitosa, a genus of butterflies in the family Riodinidae
