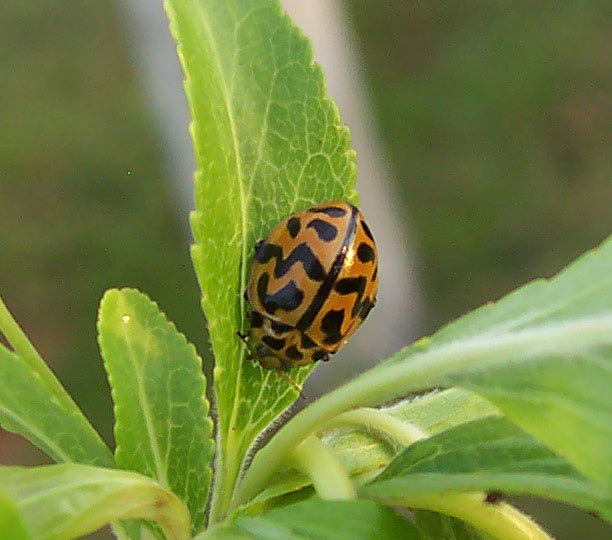

Scientific classification
- Kingdom: Animalia
- Phylum: Arthropoda
- Clade: Pancrustacea
- Class: Insecta
- Order: Coleoptera
- Suborder: Polyphaga
- Infraorder: Cucujiformia
- Family: Coccinellidae
- Genus: Cleobora; Mulsant, 1850
- Species: C. mellyi

Binomial name
- Cleobora mellyi (Mulsant, 1850)

Synonyms
- Cleodora mellyi Mulsant, 1850

= Cleobora =

Cleobora mellyi

Species of beetle

Cleobora is a monotypic genus of ladybird native to Tasmania and the southern states of mainland Australia. Its only recognized species is Cleobora mellyi, the Tasmanian ladybird or southern ladybird. It is in the Coccinellini tribe of the subfamily Coccinellinae.

C. mellyi was introduced to New Zealand in 1977 as a biological control agent against the eucalypt tortoise beetle, Paropsis charybdis, with mixed results.

== Description ==
Adults reach a length of about 5.5–9 mm (0.22–0.35 in). The head is yellow or orange, with black markings on the clypeus. The pronotum and elytra are orange or yellow, with a black pattern and transverse bands on the elytra.
