= Erythroneda =

Scientific classification
- Kingdom: Animalia
- Phylum: Arthropoda
- Clade: Pancrustacea
- Class: Insecta
- Order: Coleoptera
- Suborder: Polyphaga
- Infraorder: Cucujiformia
- Family: Coccinellidae
- Subfamily: Coccinellinae
- Tribe: Coccinellini
- Genus: Erythroneda; Timberlake, 1943

Genus of beetles

Erythroneda is a genus of lady beetles in the family Coccinellidae.

== Species ==
- Erythroneda bugaboo Vandenberg & Gordon, 1988
- Erythroneda linda Vandenberg & Gordon, 1988
- Erythroneda rubida (Mulsant, 1850)
- Erythroneda vigilans (Mulsant, 1850)
