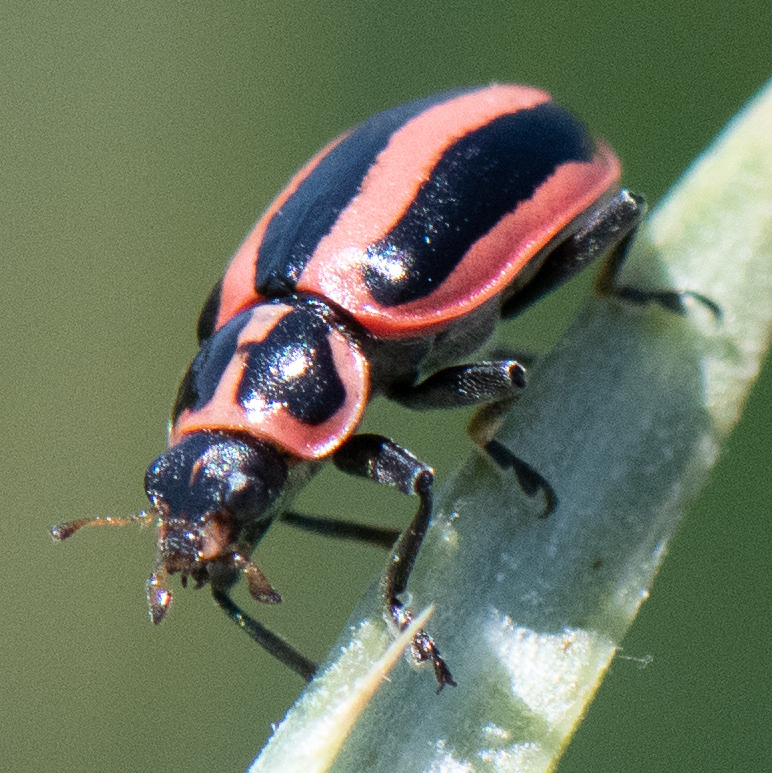
- P. vittigera, Yolo County, California, 2020

Scientific classification
- Kingdom: Animalia
- Phylum: Arthropoda
- Clade: Pancrustacea
- Class: Insecta
- Order: Coleoptera
- Suborder: Polyphaga
- Infraorder: Cucujiformia
- Family: Coccinellidae
- Subfamily: Coccinellinae
- Tribe: Coccinellini
- Genus: Paranaemia; Casey, 1899
- Species: P. vittigera

Binomial name
- Paranaemia vittigera (Mannerheim, 1843)

Synonyms
- Hippodamia vittigera Mannerheim, 1843; Ceratomegilla vittigera (Mannerheim, 1843)

= Paranaemia =

Genus of beetles

Paranaemia is a genus of lady beetles in the subfamily Coccinellinae. There is one described species in Paranaemia, P. vittigera, the broad-striped lady beetle. The broad-striped lady beetle is native to western North America.

== Taxonomy ==
First described by Carl Gustaf Emil Mannerheim in 1843, P. vittigera was considered within the genus Hippodamia. Then in 1899, Thomas Lincoln Casey Jr. described the monotypic genus Paranaemia by contrasting P. vittigera's basally toothed claws with the bifid claws of Hippodamia specimens. He named the species after its characteristic "vittae" which are the black stripes found on its elytra.

A more modern study using molecular analysis with 5 nuclear genes and 1 mitochondrial gene supports Casey's morphologically based hypothesis by placing Paranaemia in an entirely separate clade from Hippodamia.

== Description ==
Adults have an elongate, dorsoventrally flattened body that reaches a length of about 4.5-6.6 mm. They have elytra that can range from yellow to pink with three black vittae and a black head. The pronotum matches the color of the elytra has two large triangular black spots.

An adult's characteristic vittae can result in confusion with Hippodamia and Macronaemia specimens. However, they can be distinguished by their margined pronotal base.

== Habitat and distribution ==
Its habitat can range from plants near riverbanks, streams, and other wetlands to meadows, grasslands and among agricultural field crops.

It has been recorded from Alberta to western Texas, west to British Columbia and California as well as the Mexican states of Michoacán and Guanajuato. In addition to western North America, it has also been introduced to Hawai'i.

== Ecology and behavior ==
P. vittigera is omnivorous, feeding on plant matter as well as aphids and other soft-bodied insects. However, it has been found in Mexico to be less voracious and a slower forager when compared to other nearby native lady beetle species such as Hippodamia convergens and Cycloneda sanguinea as well as invasive lady beetles like Harmonia axyridis.

The adults are known to be parasitized by nematodes of the family Mermithidae and mites of the genus Coccipolipus.

They are also known to show strong tendencies of monospecific aggregation.
