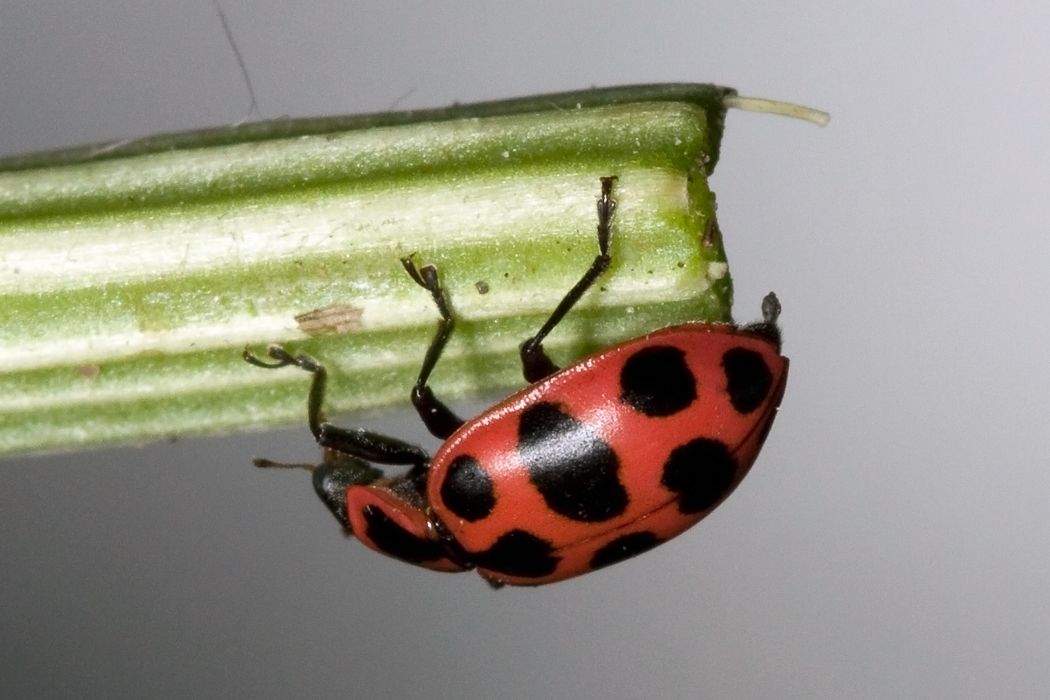
- C. maculata lengi on stem

Scientific classification
- Kingdom: Animalia
- Phylum: Arthropoda
- Clade: Pancrustacea
- Class: Insecta
- Order: Coleoptera
- Suborder: Polyphaga
- Infraorder: Cucujiformia
- Family: Coccinellidae
- Genus: Coleomegilla
- Species: C. maculata

Binomial name
- Coleomegilla maculata (De Geer, 1775)

Synonyms
- Coccinella maculata De Geer, 1775; Chrysomela decemmaculata Fabricius, 1775 (preocc.); Coccinella oblonga Olivier, 1791; Coccinella bisexpunctata Latreille, 1833; Coccinella limensis Philippi & Philippi, 1864; Naemia fuscilabris Mulsant, 1866; Megilla strenua Casey, 1899; Megilla medialis Casey, 1899; Megilla maculata var. floridana Leng, 1903; Coleomegilla lengi Timberlake, 1943

= Coleomegilla maculata =

Species of beetle

Coleomegilla maculata, commonly known as the spotted lady beetle, pink spotted lady beetle or twelve-spotted lady beetle, is a large coccinellid beetle native across the Americas. The adults and larvae feed primarily on aphids and the species has been used as a biological control agent. Based on name connotation and to avoid confusion with other species also called "spotted lady beetle", the most appropriate common name for this species is probably "spotted pink lady beetle".

== Subspecies ==
- Coleomegilla maculata bisexpunctata (Latreille, 1833)
- Coleomegilla maculata fuscilabris (Mulsant, 1866)
- Coleomegilla maculata lengi Timberlake, 1943
- Coleomegilla maculata limensis (Philippi & Philippi, 1864)
- Coleomegilla maculata maculata (De Geer, 1775)
- Coleomegilla maculata medialis (Casey, 1899)
- Coleomegilla maculata strenua (Casey, 1899)

== Description ==
This is generally an oblong, flattened lady beetle species averaging about 6 mm (0.24 in) long. Over most of its range the species is pink in coloration, except for the subspecies C. m. fuscilabris, which is bright orange or red. Each elytron features six black markings. The thorax is a similar shade of red with two large triangular black patches. Similarity is most apparent with the seaside lady beetle, Naemia seriata, but that species is limited to coastal habitats and features much larger black markings. In that species, the apical pair of spots on the wing covers as well as the pronotum markings are merged, unlike Coleomegilla maculata.

The larvae resemble miniature alligators and are dark colored. They have three pairs of legs and grow to about 6 mm (0.24 in) long. The eggs are spindle shaped and laid upright in groups near potential prey.

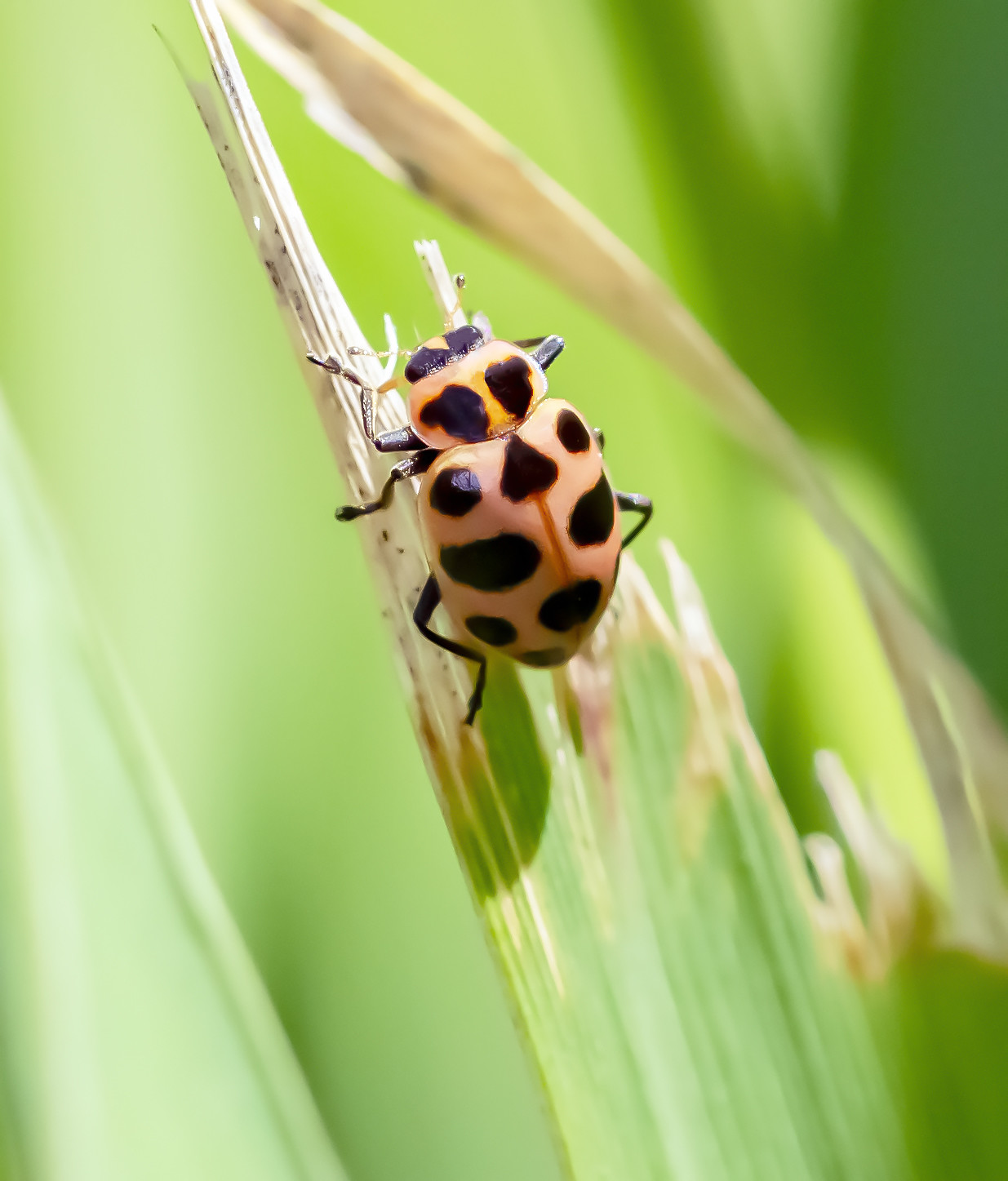
Spotted pink lady beetle (Coleomegilla maculata lengi)

== Life cycle ==
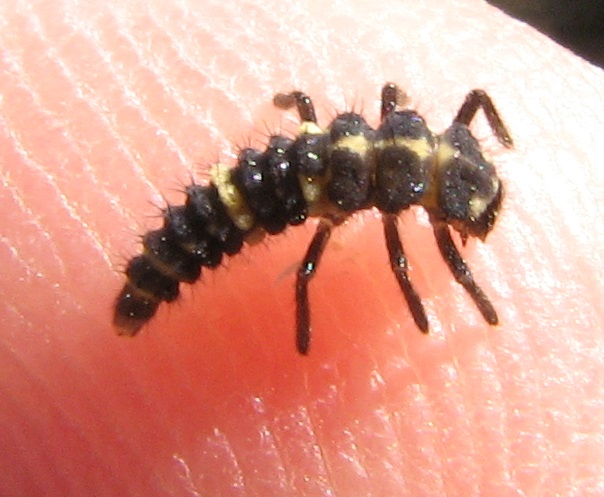
Coleomegilla maculata lengi larva

A female beetle may lay between 200 and 1,000 eggs in groups of 8-15 in protected sites on stems and leaves over a three-month period. The larvae actively seek out prey and may travel as far as 12 m (39 ft) in their search for food. The larvae grow rapidly, molting four times before attaching themselves by the abdomen to a leaf or other surface to pupate. The adult beetles emerge from three to twelve days later depending on the temperature. There are two to five generations per year. This species is most abundant in September when they congregate before mating and winter hibernation. They overwinter in large aggregations in leaf litter, under stones and in other protected sites at the edge of fields and hedgerows. They emerge in spring and look for suitable prey and egg laying sites in nearby crops, often dispersing by walking along the ground.

== Habitat ==
These lady beetles can be seen wherever the insects on which they prey are found. Crops which support aphid populations include wheat, sorghum, sweet corn, alfalfa, soybeans, peas, beans, cotton, potatoes, brassicaceous crops, wild rice, tomatoes, asparagus and apples. Besides aphids, they include in their diet adelgids, mites, insect eggs (an example is fall webworm eggs) and small larvae. They also eat pollen which may constitute up to 50% of their food intake, nectar, water and honeydew. When normal prey is scarce, both adults and larvae sometimes exhibit cannibalistic tendencies, eating eggs, larvae and pupae of their own species.

== Research ==
It has been found experimentally that interplanting a crop susceptible to aphid attack with a flowering plant such as the dandelion, Taraxacum officinale, encouraged predation on aphids because the spotted lady beetles were attracted to their pollen-rich flowers.

The spotted lady beetle commonly oviposits on the native weed, Acalypha ostryifolia, when it grows near sweet corn crops in Kentucky. A research study showed that the insect favoured the weed over the corn even though it housed no prey insects. The first instar larvae fell from the weed plants and crawled across the soil for a distance of up to 8 m (26 ft) a day before ascending a sweet corn plant or another weed plant. The presence of this weed, in close proximity to the crop, resulted in more beetle larvae on the crop than was the case when the weed was absent.

Research showed that spotted lady beetle larvae were an important cause of natural mortality for Helicoverpa zea eggs on sweet corn.

A study identified the spotted lady beetle as a significant predator of the eggs of the European corn borer, Pyrausta nubilalis, with consumption averaging sixty eggs per day.

Another study has shown that the spotted lady beetle reduced populations of eggs and small larvae of the Colorado potato beetle, Leptinotarsa decemlineata, on potatoes and that the rate of consumption was highly correlated with the air temperature.

== Biological control ==
Manipulative biological control aims to make use of the lady beetles already present in the environment by making conditions as favorable as possible for them and by avoiding spraying chemicals that will interfere with their predation.

Augmentative biological control recognizes that lady beetles may be present but may be insufficient in numbers to control the pest species and seeks to make up this deficit.

Classical biological control seeks to introduce a species that is not already present in the environment in the hope that it will become established and eventually control the pest. Supplies of the spotted lady beetle are available commercially for this purpose.

== Gallery ==
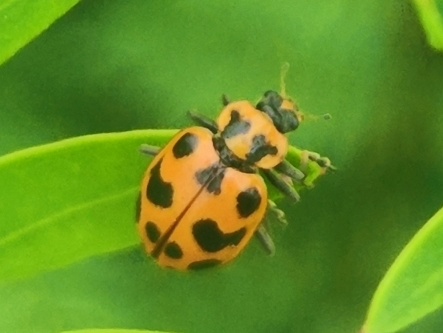
Coleomegilla maculata bisexpunctata

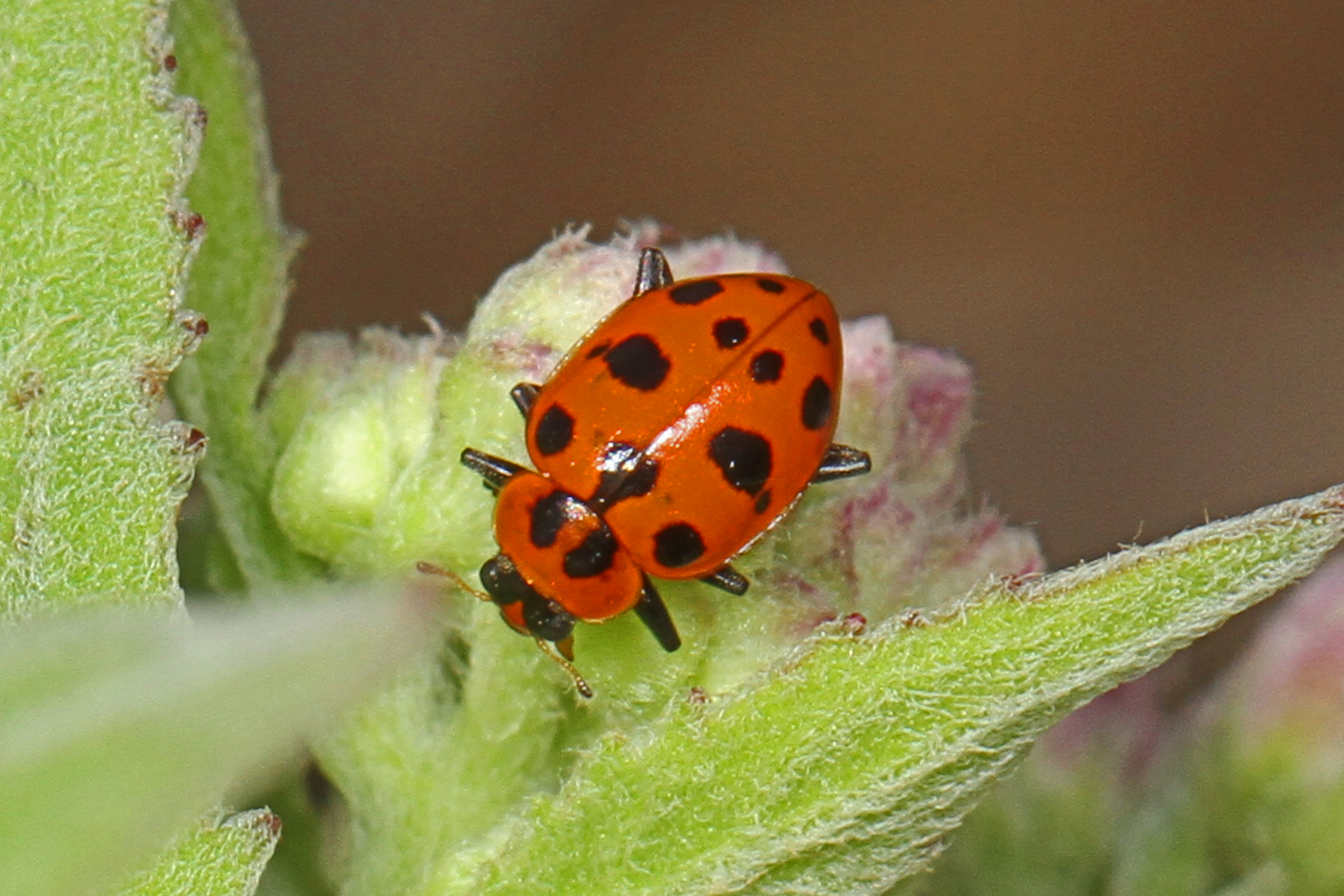
Coleomegilla maculata fuscilabris

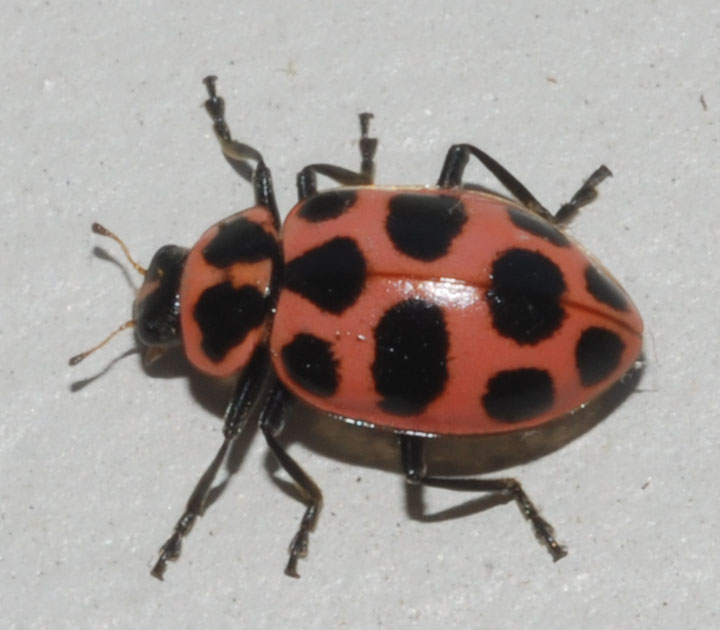
Coleomegilla maculata lengi

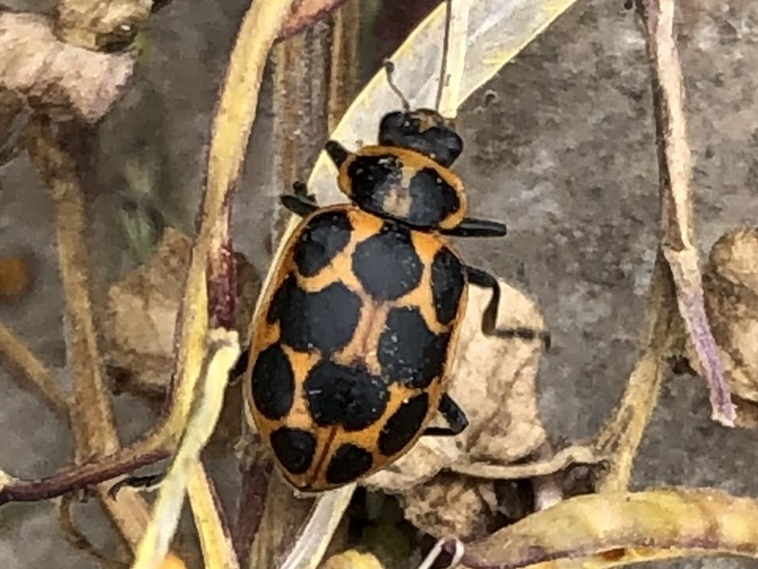
Coleomegilla maculata limensis

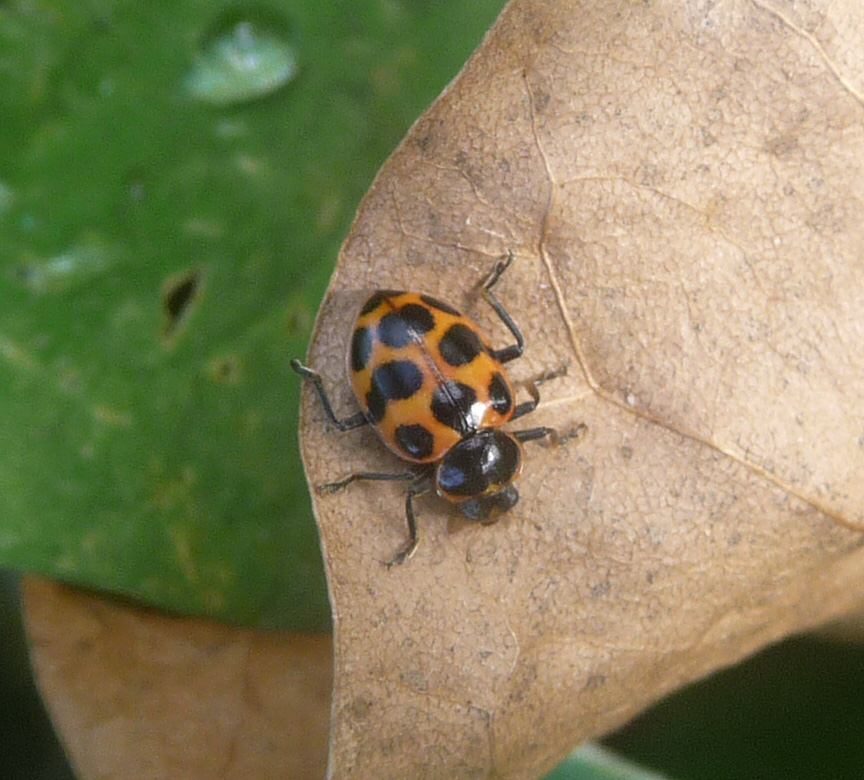
Coleomegilla maculata maculata

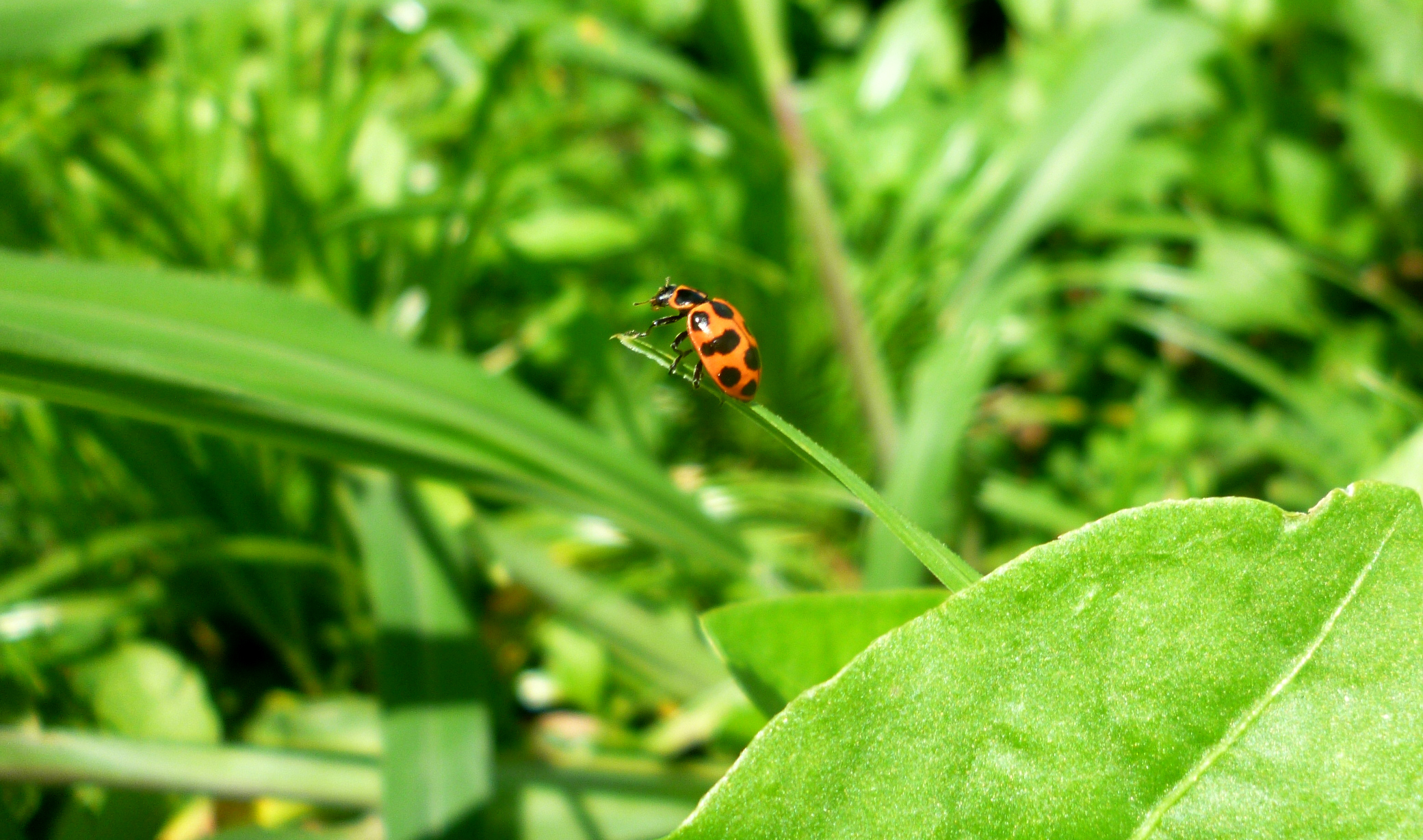
Coleomegilla maculata medialis

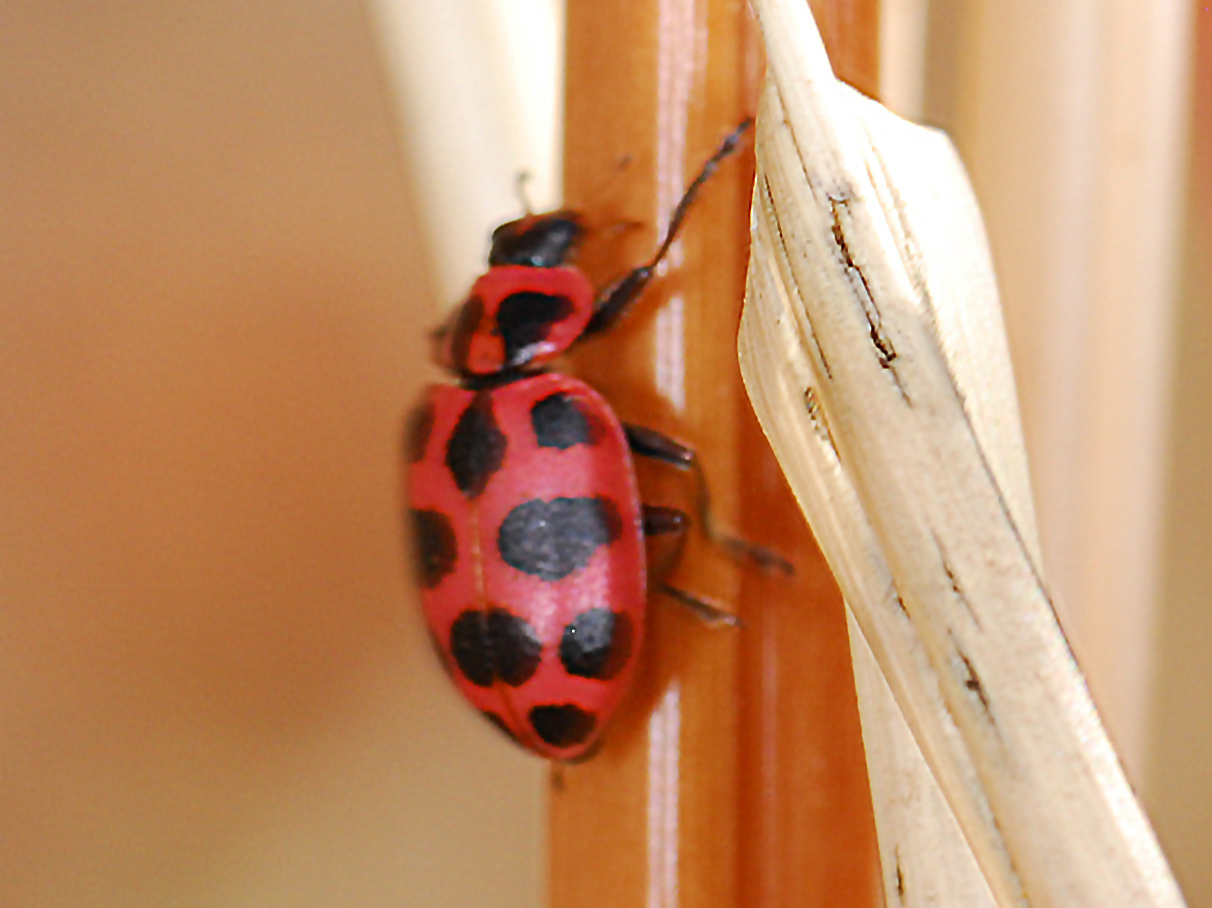
Coleomegilla maculata strenua
