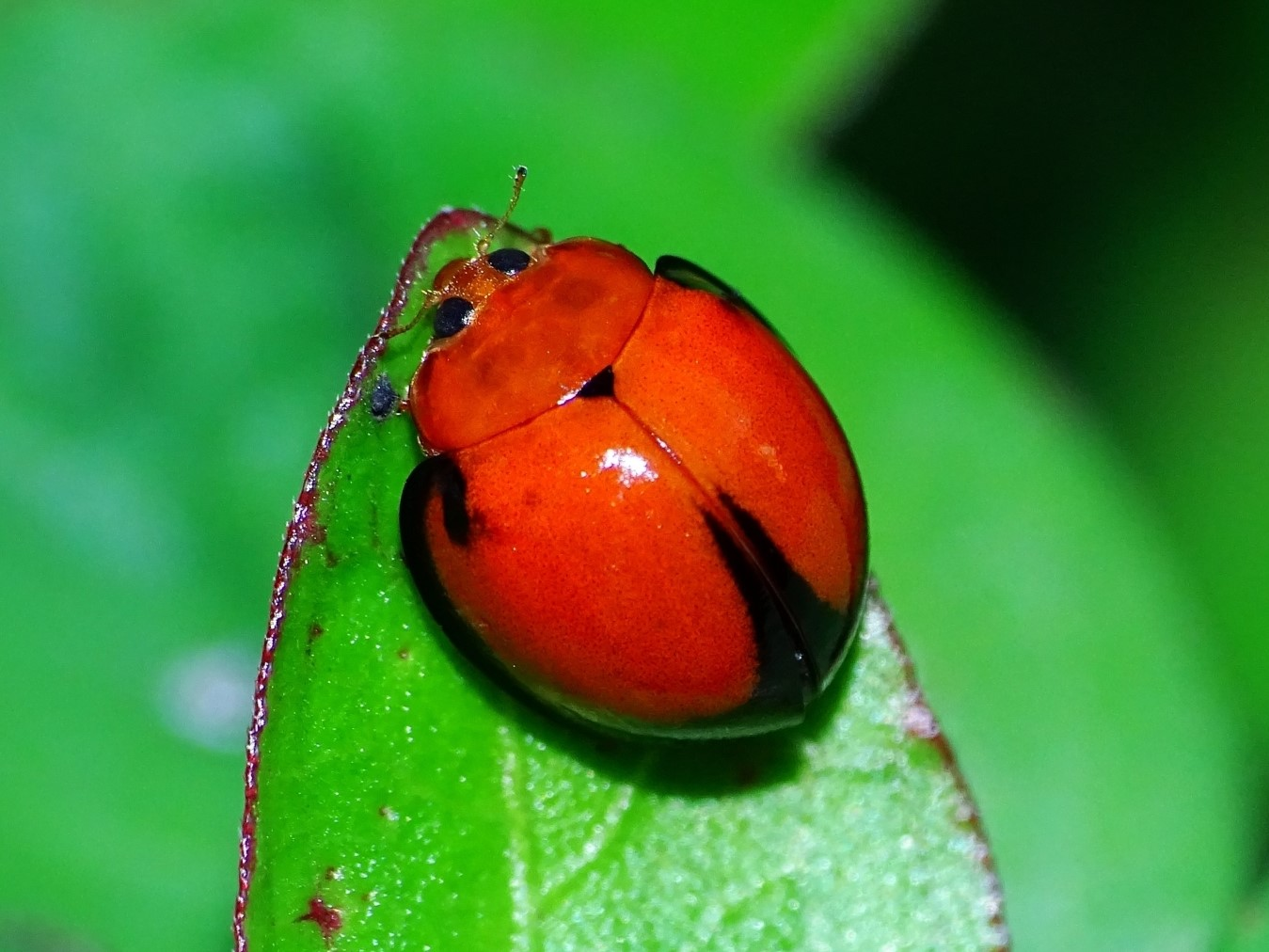
- Phrynocaria perfida

Scientific classification
- Kingdom: Animalia
- Phylum: Arthropoda
- Clade: Pancrustacea
- Class: Insecta
- Order: Coleoptera
- Suborder: Polyphaga
- Infraorder: Cucujiformia
- Family: Coccinellidae
- Subfamily: Coccinellinae
- Tribe: Coccinellini; Latreille, 1807

Synonyms
- Bulaeini Savoiskaja, 1969; Discotomini Mulsant, 1850; Halyziini Musant, 1846; Miliziellinae Filippov, 1961; Oeneini Casey, 1899; Singhikaliini Miyatake, 1972; Synonychini Weise, 1885; Tytthaspidini Crotch, 1847

= Coccinellini =

Tribe of ladybugs

Coccinellini is a tribe of beetles in the family Coccinellidae. Beetles in this family are predators of aphids and psyllids.

== Taxonomy ==
The following genera are recognised in the tribe Coccinellini:

- Aaages
- Adalia
- Aiolocaria
- Alloneda
- Anatis
- Anegleis
- Anisolemnia
- Anisosticta
- Aphidecta
- Archegleis
- Argosadalia
- Armadillita
- Australoneda
- Bulaea
- Callicaria
- Calvia
- Carpinchita
- Ceratomegilla
- Cheilomenes
- Chloroneda
- Cirocolla
- Cleobora
- Clynis
- Coccinella
- Coccinula
- Coelophora
- Coleomegilla
- Cycloneda
- Cyrtocaria
- Declivitata
- Discotoma
- Docimocaria
- Dysis
- Egleis
- Eoadalia
- Eonaemia
- Eothea
- Eriopis
- Erythroneda
- Eumegilla
- Euseladia
- Halyzia
- Harmonia
- Heterocaria
- Heteroneda
- Hippodamia
- Hysia
- Illeis
- Jaguarita
- Kiiro
- Lioadalia
- Macroilleis
- Macronaemia
- Megalocaria
- Megillina
- Metamyrrha
- Micraspis
- Microcaria
- Microneda
- Miyataketentou
- Mononeda
- Mulsantina
- Myrrha
- Myzia
- Naemia
- Neda
- Neocalvia
- Neohalyzia
- Neoharmonia
- Nesis
- Nobuotentou
- Oenopia
- Olla
- Omalocaria
- Oxytella
- Palaeoneda
- Paranaemia
- Paraneda
- Phrynocaria
- Pristonema
- Procula
- Propylea
- Protothea
- Psyllobora
- Seladia
- Singhikalia
- Sospita
- Sphaeroneda
- Spilindolla
- Spiloneda
- Subepilachna
- Synona
- Synonycha
- Tapirita
- Tytthaspis
- Vibidia
- Vodella
- Xanthadalia

== Selected former genera ==
- Antineda
- Bothrocalvia
- Isora
