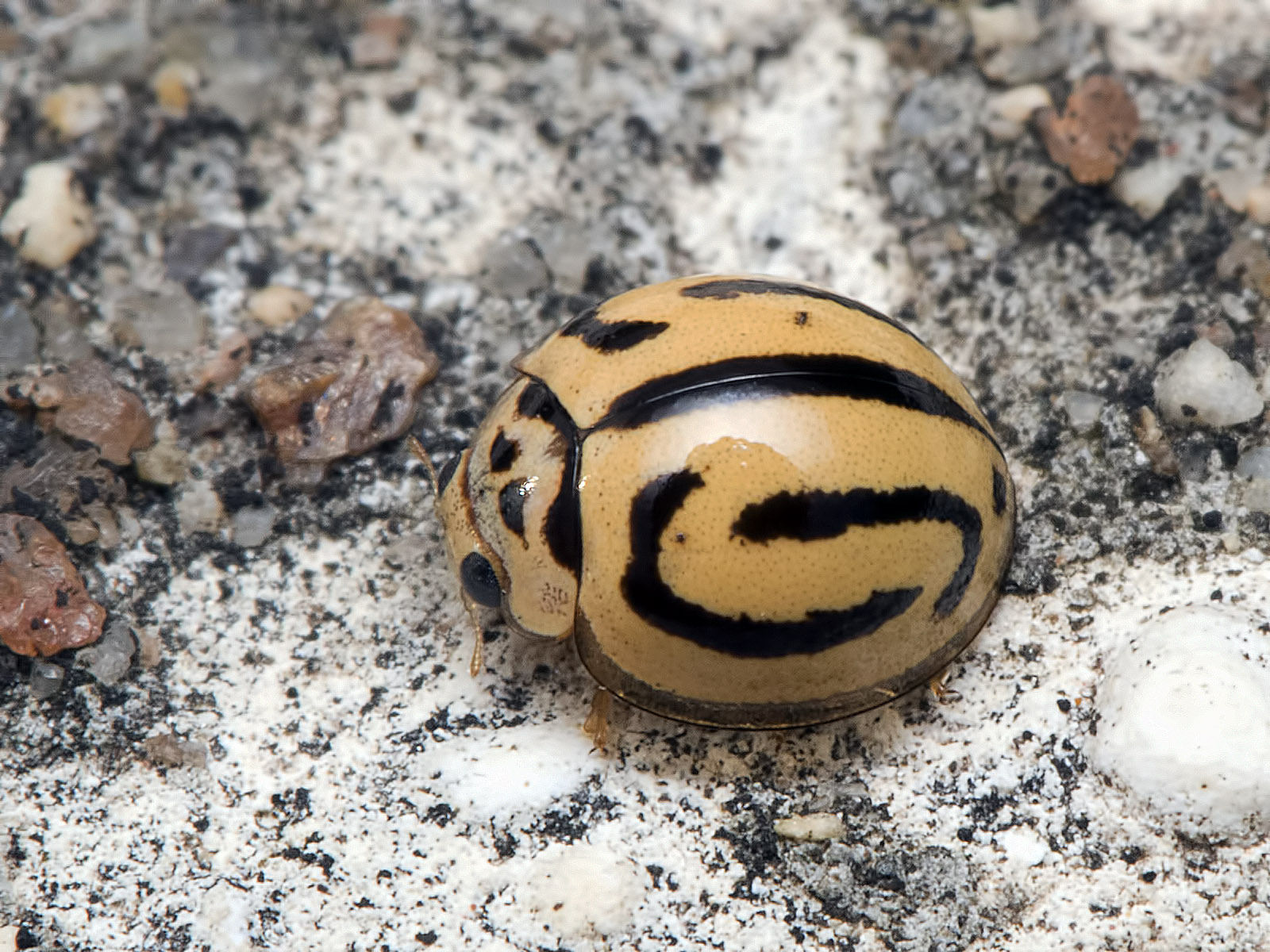

Scientific classification
- Kingdom: Animalia
- Phylum: Arthropoda
- Clade: Pancrustacea
- Class: Insecta
- Order: Coleoptera
- Suborder: Polyphaga
- Infraorder: Cucujiformia
- Family: Coccinellidae
- Subfamily: Coccinellinae
- Tribe: Coccinellini
- Genus: Anegleis; Iablokoff-Khnzorian, 1982
- Species: A. cardoni

Binomial name
- Anegleis cardoni (Weise, 1900)

Synonyms
- Verania cardoni Weise, 1892

= Anegleis =

Genus of beetles

Anegleis cardoni is a species of lady beetle found in India, Pakistan and Sri Lanka. It is the only species in the genus Anegleis. The species name is after the collector Father Louis Cardon.

== Description ==
It is a medium-sized lady beetle. Body bright yellow with one black median stripe at the joint of both the elytra.

== Biology ==
It is known to feed on a many species of aphids such as: Uroleucon compositae, Rhopalosiphum maidis, Hyadaphis coriandri, Myzus persicae, Brevicoryne brassicae, Macrosiphum miscanthi, Macrosiphum pisi, Aphis gossypii, Aphis craccivora, and Lipaphis erysimi. In addition to aphids, it is also a predator of whiteflies and scale insects.
