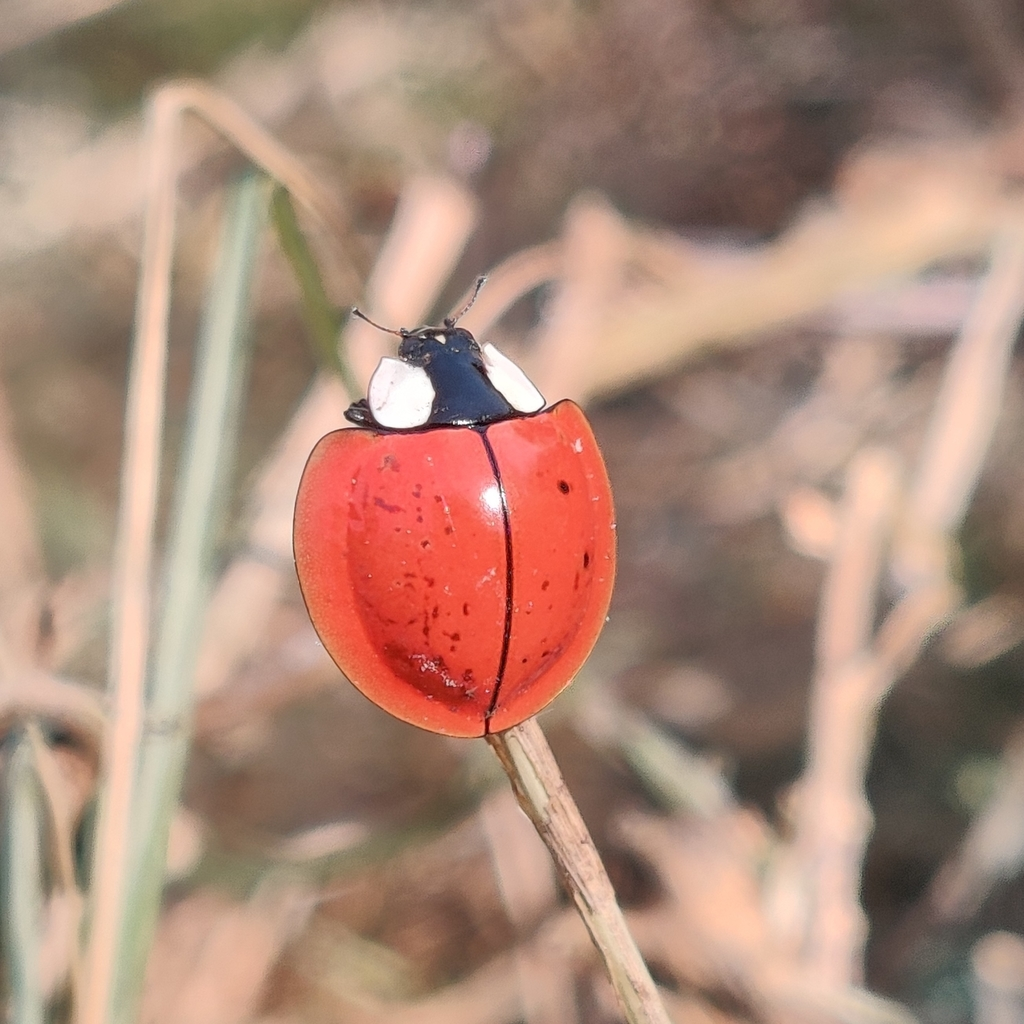

Scientific classification
- Kingdom: Animalia
- Phylum: Arthropoda
- Clade: Pancrustacea
- Class: Insecta
- Order: Coleoptera
- Suborder: Polyphaga
- Infraorder: Cucujiformia
- Family: Coccinellidae
- Subfamily: Coccinellinae
- Tribe: Coccinellini
- Genus: Palaeoneda; Crotch, 1871
- Species: P. auriculata

Binomial name
- Palaeoneda auriculata (Mulsant, 1866)

Synonyms
- Neda auriculata Mulsant, 1866; Coccinella miniata Hope, 1831 (preocc.)

= Palaeoneda =

Genus of beetles

Palaeoneda is a genus of beetle of the family Coccinellidae. It is monotypic, being represented by the single species, Palaeoneda auriculata, which is found in India (Himachal Pradesh, Jammu & Kashmir, Sikkim, Uttarakhand, Uttar Pradesh, West Bengal), Nepal, Bhutan and Pakistan.

== Description ==
Adults reach a length of about 11.9–13.5 mm (0.47–0.53 in). The head is black and the pronotum has a black marking and yellowish sides and anterior margin. The elytra are yellowish brown or ochreous or orange or reddish testaceous with a black sutural stripe and a black basal margin.

== Life history ==
They have been recorded preying on Adelgidae species.
