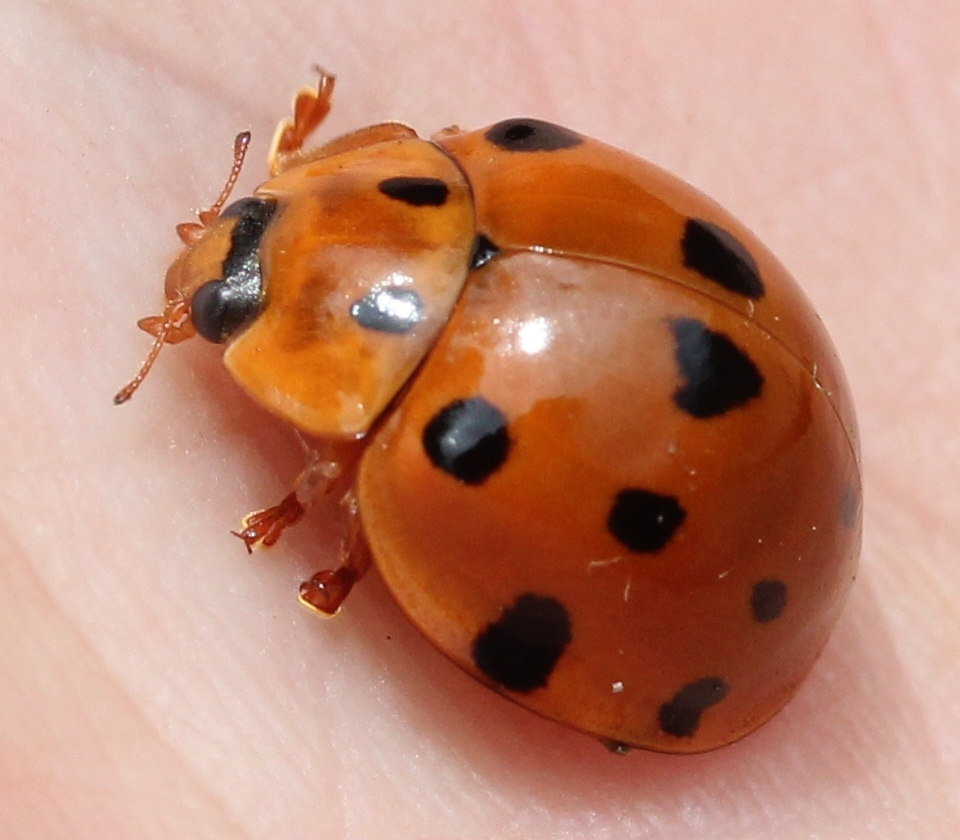

Scientific classification
- Kingdom: Animalia
- Phylum: Arthropoda
- Clade: Pancrustacea
- Class: Insecta
- Order: Coleoptera
- Suborder: Polyphaga
- Infraorder: Cucujiformia
- Family: Coccinellidae
- Subfamily: Coccinellinae
- Tribe: Coccinellini
- Genus: Callicaria; Crotch, 1871
- Species: C. superba

Binomial name
- Callicaria superba (Mulsant, 1853)

Synonyms
- Pseudosynonycha Kurisaki, 1923; Caria superba Mulsant, 1853; Synonycha japonica Kurisaki, 1914

= Callicaria =

Genus of beetles

Callicaria is a genus of beetle of the family Coccinellidae. It is monotypic, being represented by the single species, Callicaria superba, which is found in India (Himachal Pradesh, Manipur, Meghalaya, Sikkim, Uttarakhand, West Bengal), Nepal, Bhutan, China, Tibet, Taiwan and Japan.

== Description ==
Adults reach a length of about 11–12 mm (0.43–0.47 in). The dorsum is dark blood red to orange-red, with a pair of black spots on the pronotum. The scutellum is black and each elytron has seven black spots.

== Life history ==
They have been recorded preying on aphid species.
