= Cirocolla =

Scientific classification
- Kingdom: Animalia
- Phylum: Arthropoda
- Clade: Pancrustacea
- Class: Insecta
- Order: Coleoptera
- Suborder: Polyphaga
- Infraorder: Cucujiformia
- Family: Coccinellidae
- Subfamily: Coccinellinae
- Tribe: Coccinellini
- Genus: Cirocolla; Vandenberg, 1992
- Species: C. conspicillata

Binomial name
- Cirocolla conspicillata (Mulsant, 1850)

Genus of ladybug in the tribe Coccinellini

Cirocolla is a genus of ladybug belonging to the tribe Coccinellini. This genus only contains one species, that being Cirocolla conspicillata.
