= Alloneda =

- Alloneda dodecaspilota

Scientific classification
- Kingdom: Animalia
- Phylum: Arthropoda
- Clade: Pancrustacea
- Class: Insecta
- Order: Coleoptera
- Suborder: Polyphaga
- Infraorder: Cucujiformia
- Family: Coccinellidae
- Subfamily: Coccinellinae
- Tribe: Coccinellini
- Genus: Alloneda; Iablokoff-Khnzorian, 1979

Genus of beetles

Alloneda is a genus of beetles belonging to the family Coccinellidae.

== Species ==
- Alloneda callinotata
- Alloneda dentiformis
- Alloneda dodecaspilota
- Alloneda osawai
