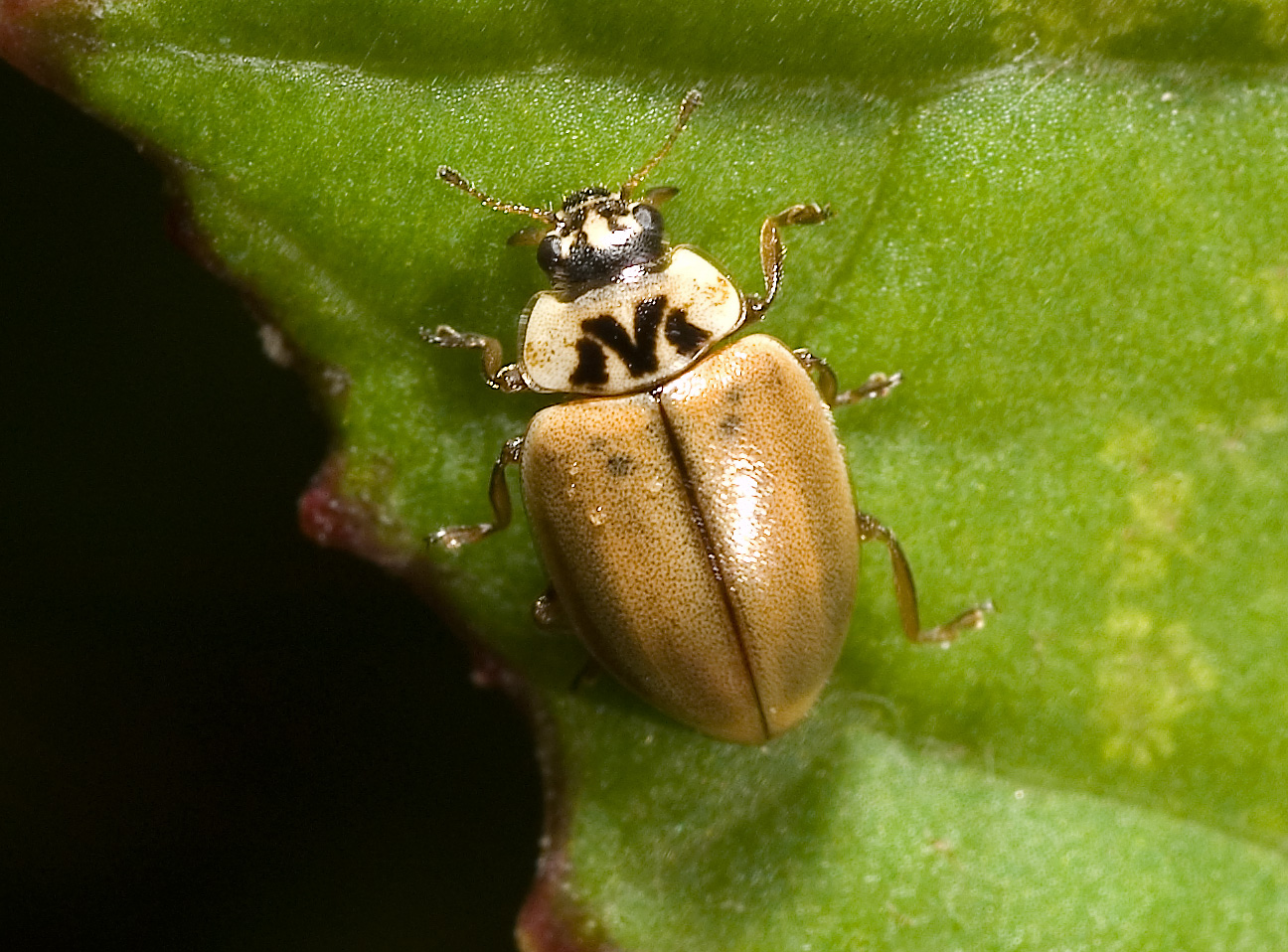
- Dorsal view

Conservation status
- Least Concern (IUCN 3.1)

Scientific classification
- Kingdom: Animalia
- Phylum: Arthropoda
- Clade: Pancrustacea
- Class: Insecta
- Order: Coleoptera
- Suborder: Polyphaga
- Infraorder: Cucujiformia
- Family: Coccinellidae
- Genus: Aphidecta
- Species: A. obliterata

Binomial name
- Aphidecta obliterata (Linnaeus, 1758)

Synonyms
- Coccinella obliterata Linnaeus, 1758; Coccinella formosa Gravenhorst, 1807; Coccinella livida DeGeer, 1775; Coccinella m-nigrum Fabricius, 1792; Coccinella obsoleta Schneider, D. H., 1792; Coccinella pallida Thunberg, 1784; Coccinella sexnotata Thunberg, 1784

= Aphidecta obliterata =

Species of beetle

Aphidecta obliterata, commonly known as the larch ladybird, or larch ladybug, is a species of Coccinellidae, a flying beetle.

== Distribution ==
This species is present in Europe, European Russia, the Caucasus, Belarus, Ukraine, Transcaucasia, Asia Minor, North America (Virginia and South Carolina), and Newfoundland.

== Description ==
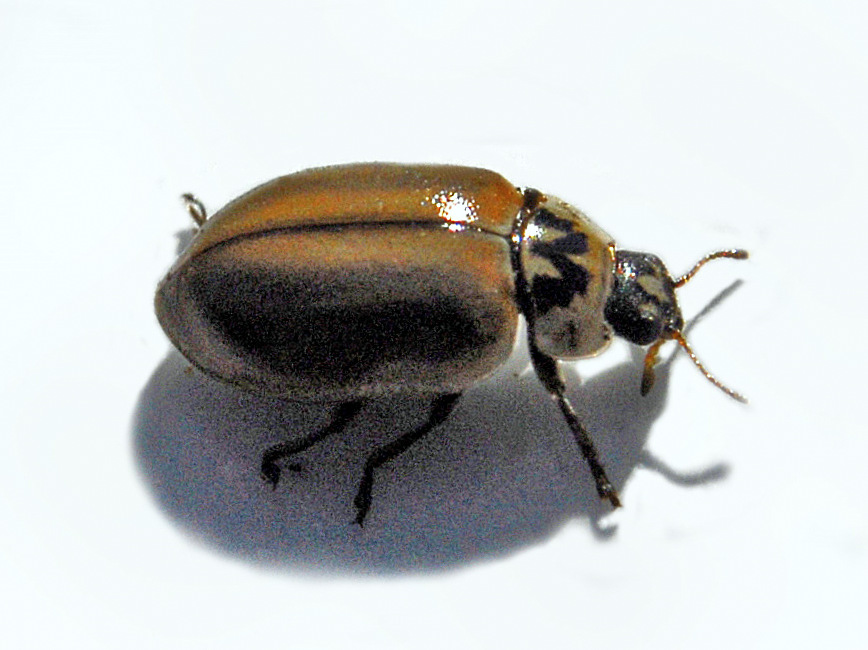
Side view of Aphidecta obliterata

Aphidecta obliterata can reach approximately a size of 3.5–5 millimetres (0.14–0.20 in). These tiny beetles have an elongate oval body, with strongly convex elytra, smooth, shiny and densely, finely punctured. Head shows a black arch-shaped marking. Antennae are club-shaped, with 9-11 segments.

The larch ladybirds are beetles with a great variability in color and markings, with several varietas. For example, Aphidecta obliterata v. fenestrata has entirely black elytra, while usually they range from tan to brown, often with a pink tinge. They have a dark suture and usually a dark oblique line posteriorly. The pronotum is beige, with four dark brown lines forming a M mark. While other species of ladybugs have prominent spots, this insect has smaller, less distinct spots, or small blotches, if any.

== Habitat ==
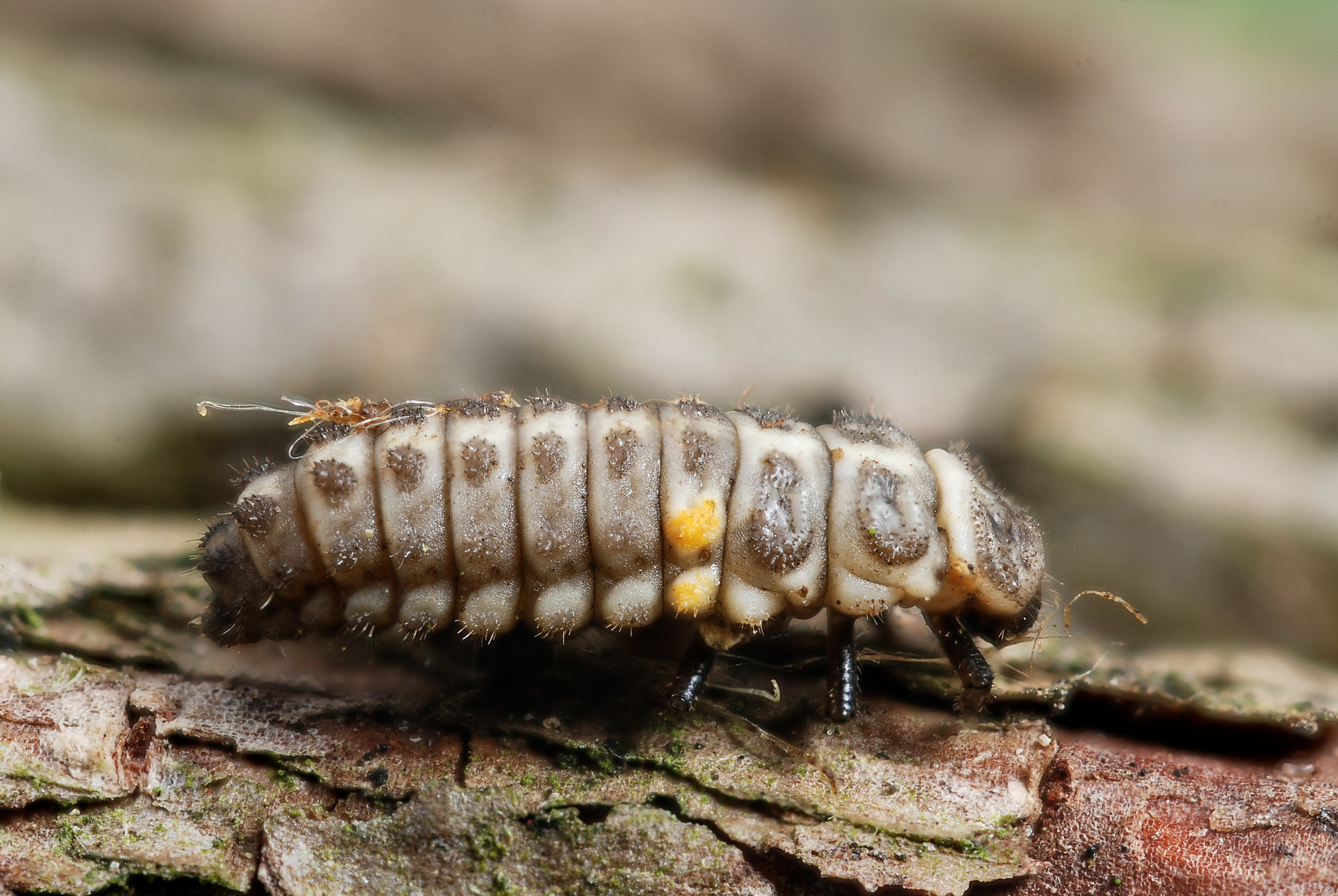
Larva of Aphidecta obliterata

Aphidecta obliterata inhabits high bogs and peat areas, mainly coniferous and mixed forests (for instance, Central European mixed forests, Sarmatic mixed forests) and, especially, in Pinus sylvestris and other temperate needleleaf forests. It is found occasionally in gardens and parks. It is mainly found on Pinus sylvestris and other Pinus species, on Picea abies, and on Larix decidua occasionally under flakes of bark, under bark, or in moss on the trunks.

== Biology ==
These beetles have a restricted range of adaptability to changes in ecological conditions. They are aphidophagous, mainly feeding on Lachnidae, Adelgidae and other aphids of pines. The adults can be found in spring and summer. They overwinter in bark crevices and in litter. They have been released in the US and Canada for biocontrol of Adelges piceae.

== Variability of Aphidecta obliterata ==
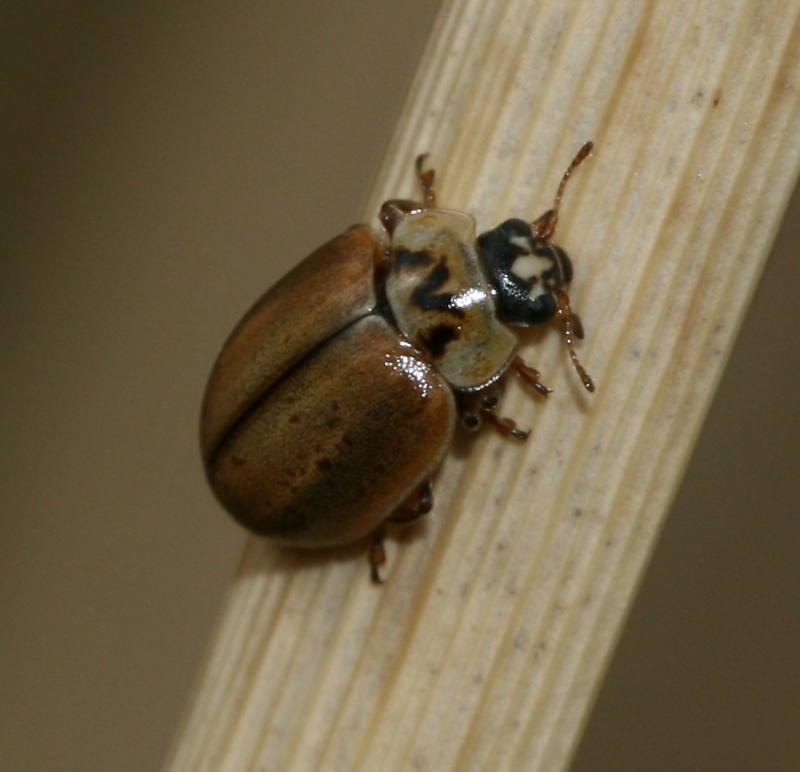
Dark brown form

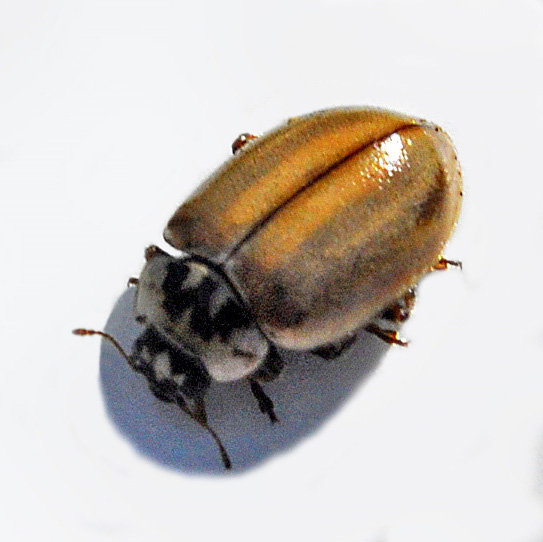
Tan color form

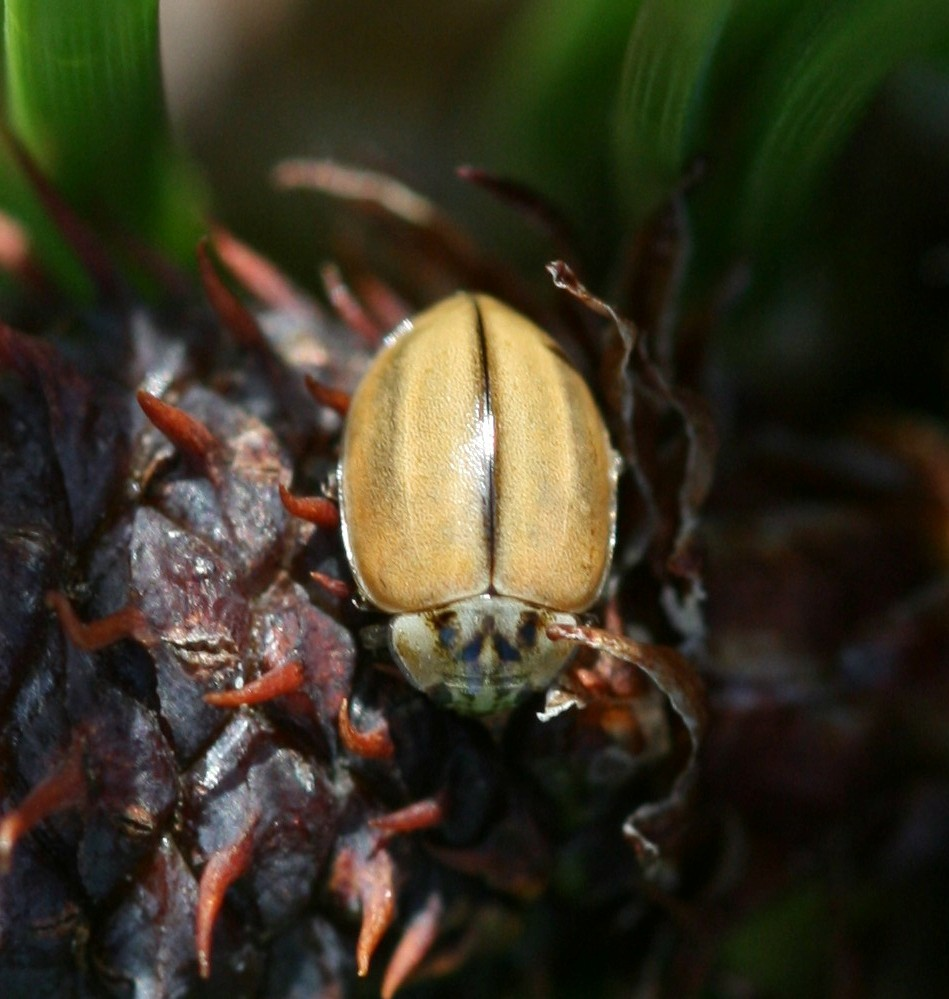
Yellow form

Some individuals have 4–6 faint spots

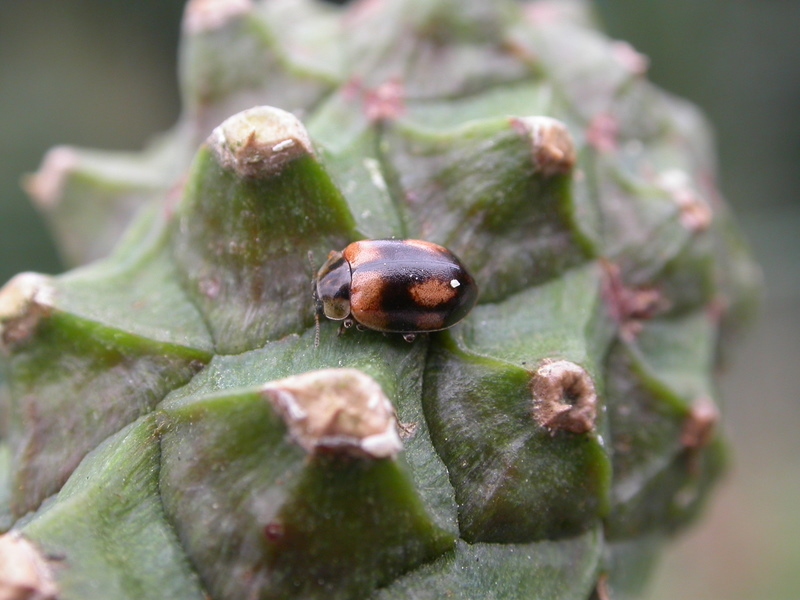
Melanic morph
