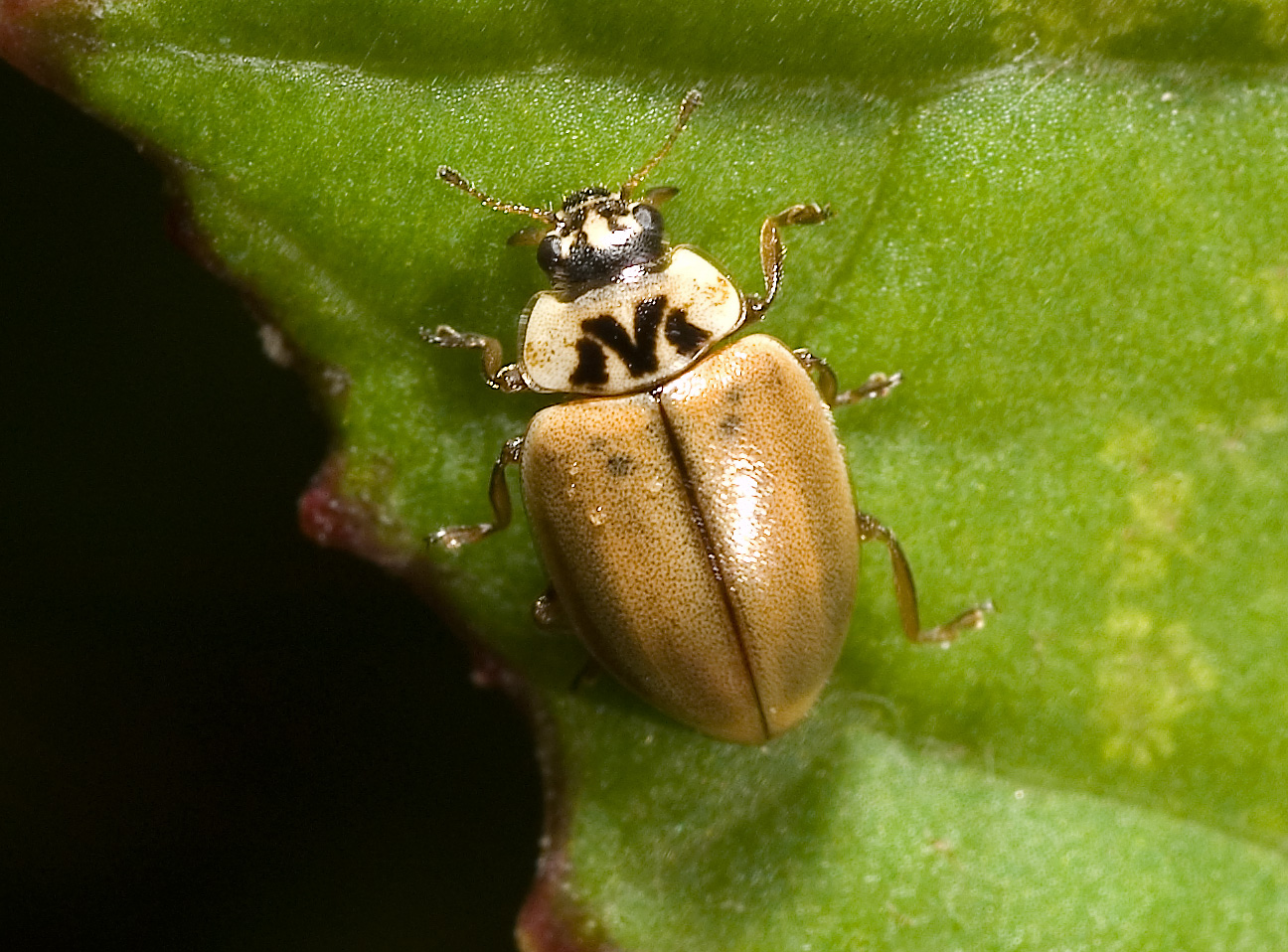

Scientific classification
- Kingdom: Animalia
- Phylum: Arthropoda
- Clade: Pancrustacea
- Class: Insecta
- Order: Coleoptera
- Suborder: Polyphaga
- Infraorder: Cucujiformia
- Family: Coccinellidae
- Subfamily: Coccinellinae
- Tribe: Coccinellini
- Genus: Aphidecta; Weise, 1893

= Aphidecta =

Genus of beetles

Aphidecta is a genus of beetles belonging to the family Coccinellidae.

== Species ==
- Aphidecta obliterata (Linnaeus, 1758)
- †Aphidecta marginata Förster, 1891
