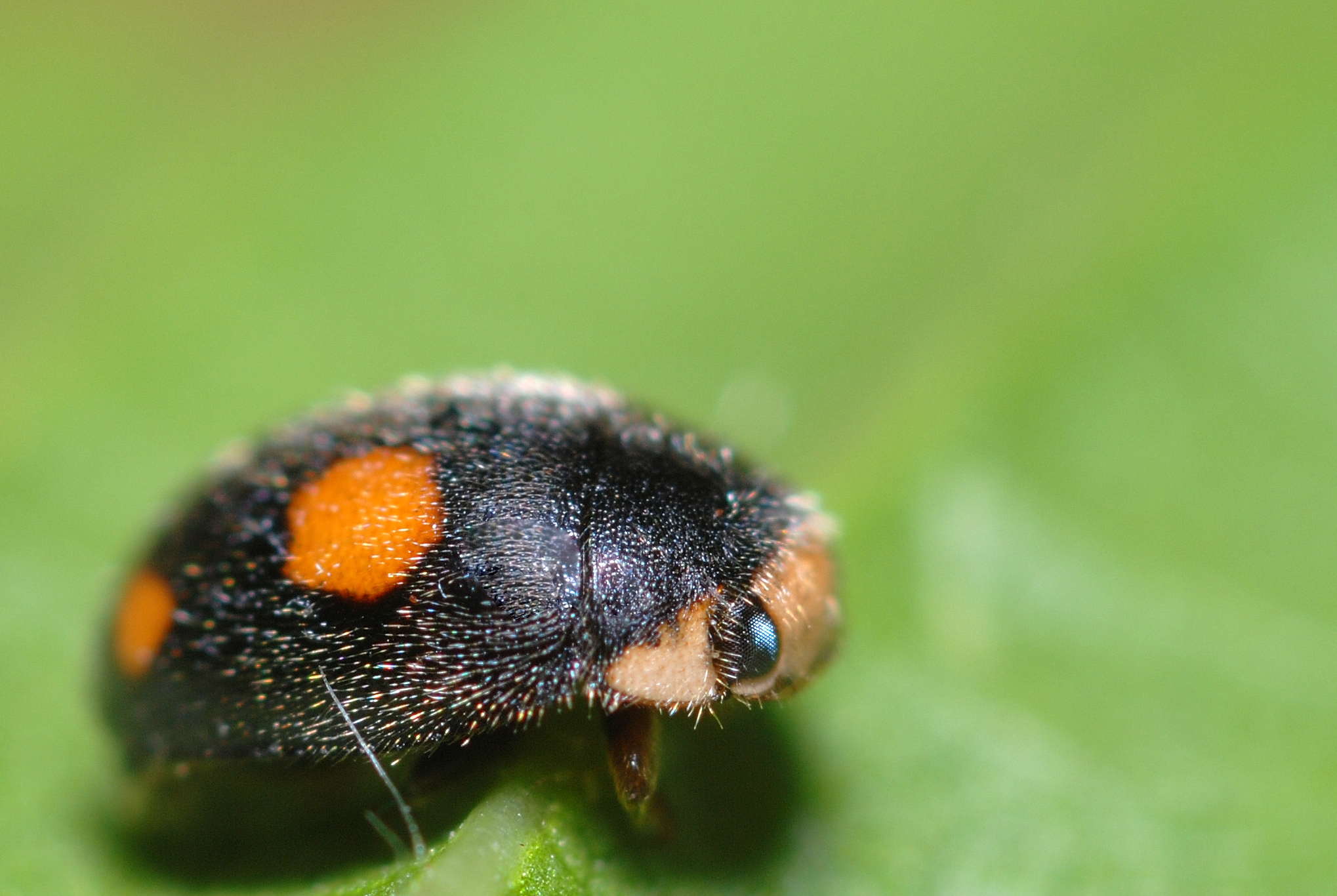
- Platynaspis luteorubra

Scientific classification
- Kingdom: Animalia
- Phylum: Arthropoda
- Clade: Pancrustacea
- Class: Insecta
- Order: Coleoptera
- Suborder: Polyphaga
- Infraorder: Cucujiformia
- Family: Coccinellidae
- Subfamily: Coccinellinae
- Tribe: Platynaspidini; Mulsant, 1846

Synonyms
- Platynaspini Casey, 1899; Platynaspiaires Mulsant, 1850

= Platynaspidini =

Tribe of beetles

The Platynaspidini are a tribe of insects within the family Coccinellidae.

== Genera ==
- Crypticolus
- Neoplatynaspis
- Platynaspis
- Platycrus
