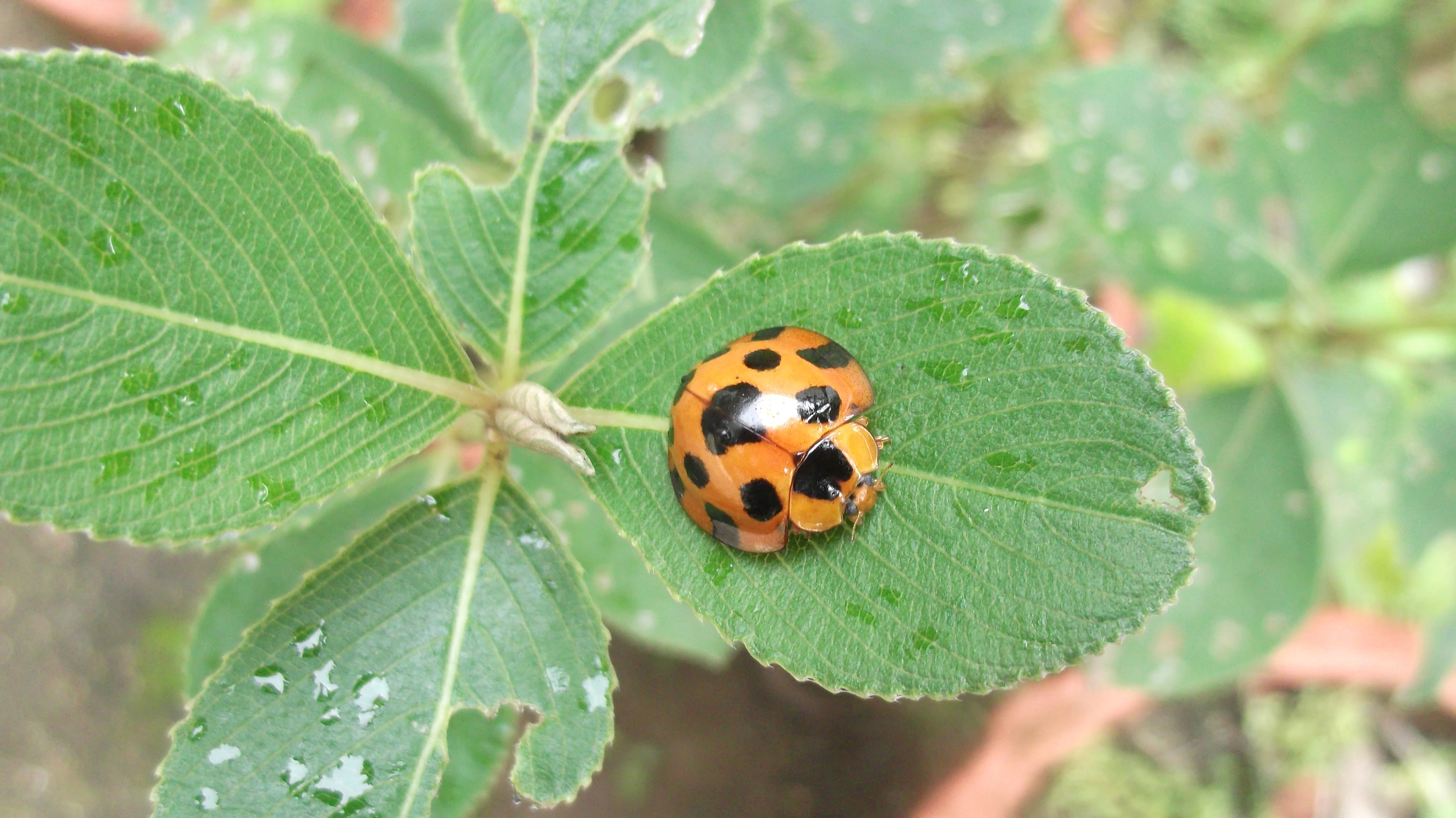

Scientific classification
- Kingdom: Animalia
- Phylum: Arthropoda
- Clade: Pancrustacea
- Class: Insecta
- Order: Coleoptera
- Suborder: Polyphaga
- Infraorder: Cucujiformia
- Family: Coccinellidae
- Subfamily: Coccinellinae
- Tribe: Coccinellini
- Genus: Synonycha; Chevrolat in Dejean, 1836
- Species: S. grandis

Binomial name
- Synonycha grandis (Thunberg, 1781)

Synonyms
- Coccinella grandis Thunberg, 1781; Synonyche grandis (Thunberg, 1781)

= Synonycha =

Species of beetle

Synonycha grandis, the giant bamboo ladybird, is a species of lady beetle found in Australia, Oceania and Southern Asia. It is the only species in the genus Synonycha.

== Distribution ==
It is found in China, India, Sri Lanka, Nepal, Indonesia, Japan, Malaysia, Philippines, Taiwan, Australia, Trinidad and Tobago, United States and Hawaii.

== Description ==
Mating occurs after one day of emergence. Mating continued to 2 to 3 hours and multiple mating is very common. After mating, adult female lays eggs on the surface of the leaf. Eggs are yellowish and spindle shaped with a length of 5 mm. Grub is elongate with tapering ends. Head square shaped with round margins. Pronotum wide with two black tubercles at extreme ends. But last abdominal segment is without tubercles, but with yellowish protrusible anal pads. Legs are slender and elongated. Dorsum black with yellow spots found on mesothorax and metathorax. Ventrum yellowish black. First instar is golden yellow in color which turned black with maturity.

Second instar starts to move and start feeding on nymphs and adults of aphids. During this period, grub is about 8 to 12 mm in length. Third instar has yellow spots on the dorsum. Pronotum completely black in color. There are yellowish two dorsally located tubercles on mesothorax. First and fourth abdominal segments are yellow, whereas second and third segments are black. Remaining abdominal segments are also black. Length of the grub is 12 to 15 mm. Fourth and fifth instar grubs are about 16 to 18 mm long, which later reaches 19 to 21 mm in the final stage of the grub stage. Pronotum black with lateral tubercles. Dorsal and lateral tubercles on mesothorax and metathorax are yellow. Pupa is bright yellow initially but later black spots appear on the dorsum.

Freshly emerged adults are golden yellow with soft fore wings. They stay in the pupal case until wings become tough. Black spots are visible on the fore wings after emergence. Elytra yellowish to red with black spots. Body length is about 13 mm and hemispherical. Female is larger than male.

== Biology ==
It is a voracious predator of bamboo aphids including: Pseudoregma bambucicola, Aphis craccivora, Aphis gossypii, Ceratovacuna lanigera, Oracella acuta and Sipha flava. When disturbed, it emits a foul smelling yellow colored fluid.
