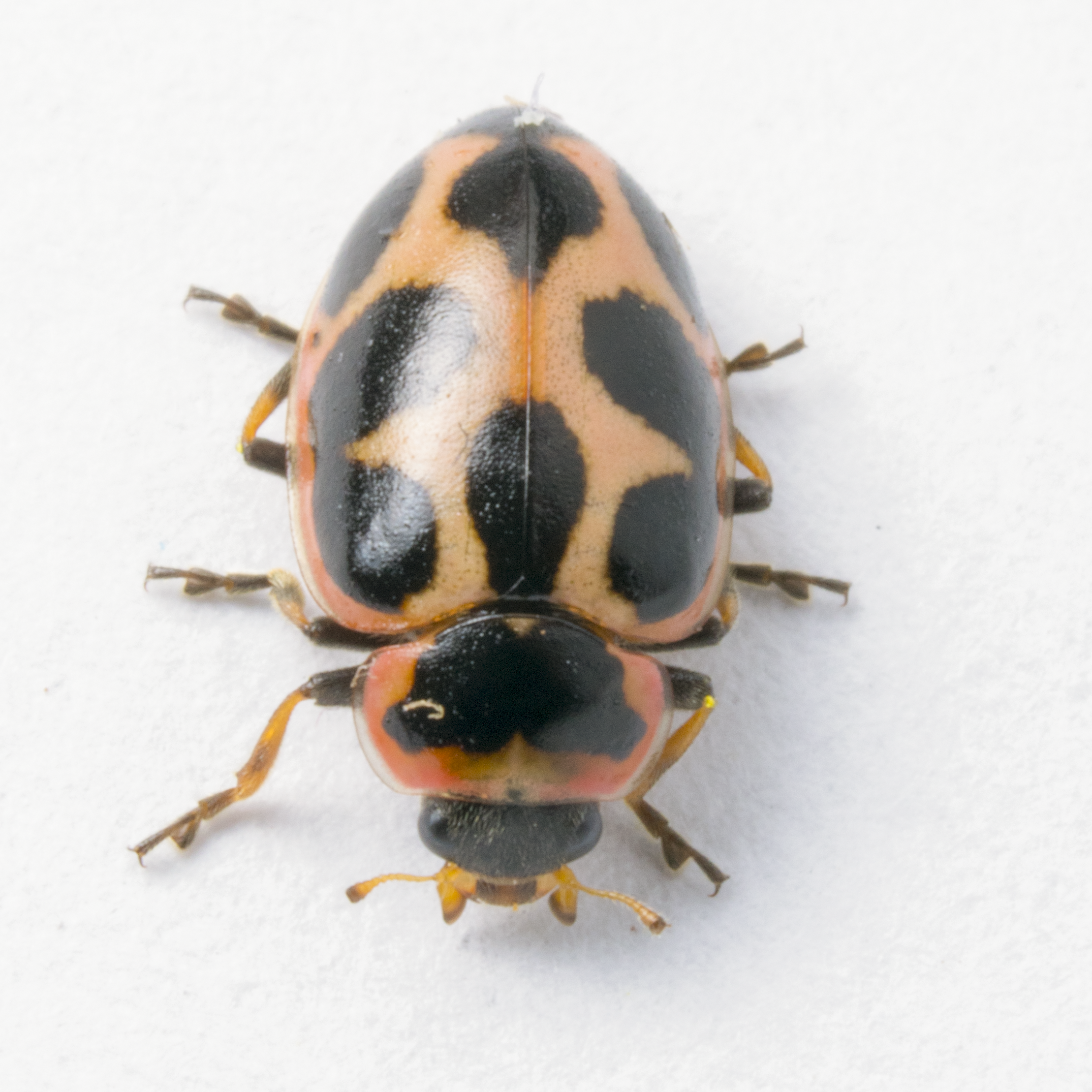

Scientific classification
- Kingdom: Animalia
- Phylum: Arthropoda
- Clade: Pancrustacea
- Class: Insecta
- Order: Coleoptera
- Suborder: Polyphaga
- Infraorder: Cucujiformia
- Family: Coccinellidae
- Subfamily: Coccinellinae
- Tribe: Coccinellini
- Genus: Naemia; Mulsant, 1850
- Species: N. seriata

Binomial name
- Naemia seriata (Melsheimer, 1847)

Synonyms
- Coccinella seriata Melsheimer, 1847; Naemia litigiosa Mulsant, 1850; Megilla fuscilabris var. decepta Blatchley, 1914

= Naemia seriata =

Species of beetle

Naemia seriata, commonly known as the seaside lady beetle, is a large coccinellid beetle native to North America, and the only species in the genus Naemia.

It is found in coastal areas such as beaches, salt marshes, and bay islands on the Atlantic and Pacific coast. This beetle is light brown, yellow, orange, or red in color, with large black spots, often connected along the sides. The pronotum usually has one large central black spot, which is occasionally split into two spots. The body of this species is elongately oval in shape, and between 4 and 6.7mm in length. The two subspecies can be distinguished by markings on the head, with the head of N. seriata seriata being black, while the head of N. seriata litigiosa has a pale triangular marking. Naemia seriata seriata is primarily distributed across Eastern North America, while N. seriata litigiosa is restricted to the American Southwest.

The seaside lady beetle may be confused for the spotted pink ladybeetle, Coleomegilla maculata, which is much more common, and is not restricted to coastal areas. The apical pair of spots on the elytra as well as the pronotum markings are merged in N. seriata, and distinctly separate in C. maculata.

== Subspecies ==
- Naemia seriata seriata (Atlantic and Gulf coasts of North America, from Rhode Island to southern Texas; Bermuda)
- Naemia seriata litigiosa (Mulsant, 1850)
