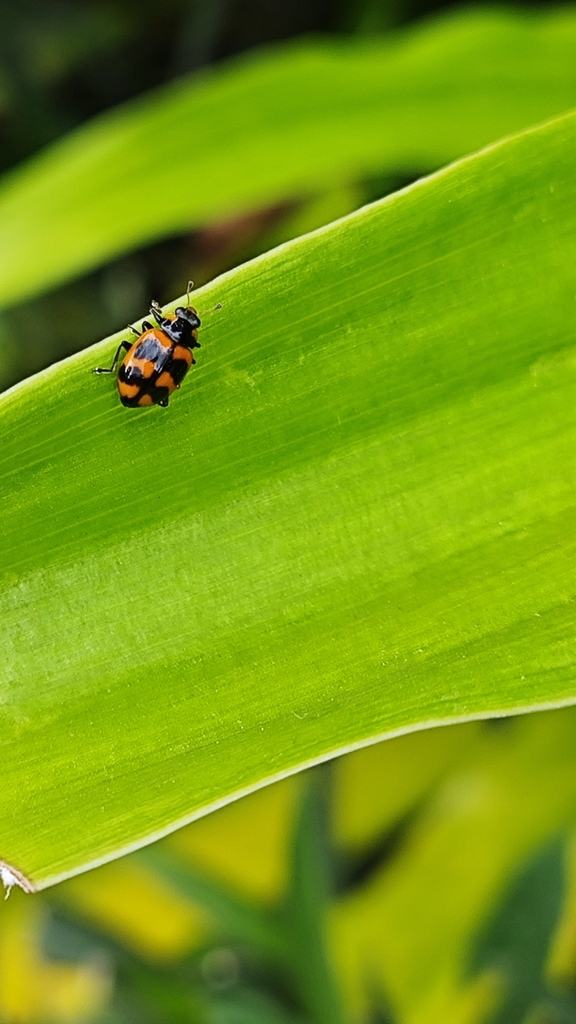

Scientific classification
- Kingdom: Animalia
- Phylum: Arthropoda
- Clade: Pancrustacea
- Class: Insecta
- Order: Coleoptera
- Suborder: Polyphaga
- Infraorder: Cucujiformia
- Family: Coccinellidae
- Subfamily: Coccinellinae
- Tribe: Coccinellini
- Genus: Hysia; Mulsant, 1850
- Species: H. endomycina

Binomial name
- Hysia endomycina (Boisduval, 1835)

Synonyms
- Coccinella endomycina Boisduval, 1835

= Hysia endomycina =

Genus of beetles

Hysia is a genus of beetle of the family Coccinellidae. It is monotypic, being represented by the single species, Hysia endomycina, which is found in Indonesia (Maluku Islands, Sulawesi, Western New Guinea) and Papua New Guinea.

== Description ==
Adults reach a length of about 5.3–7 mm (0.21–0.28 in). The frons is dark with white hairs and the antennae are yellow with a dark club. The pronotum is black with two yellow spots. The scutellum is black and the elytra are orange with three black transverse fasciae.
