= Hysia (Arcadia) =

Ancient town in modern-day Greece

Hysia (Ancient Greek: Ὑσία) was a town of ancient Arcadia mentioned by Stephanus of Byzantium.

Its site in ancient Arcadia is unlocated.
