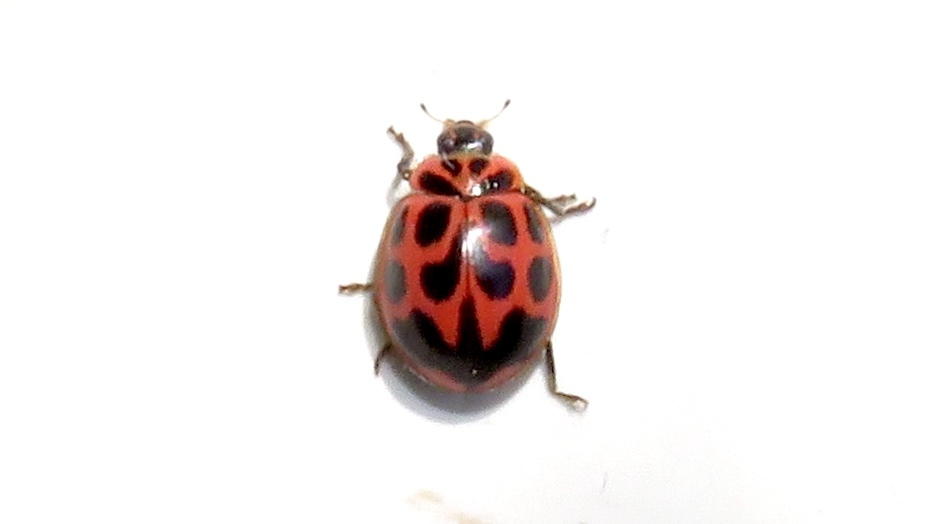

Scientific classification
- Kingdom: Animalia
- Phylum: Arthropoda
- Clade: Pancrustacea
- Class: Insecta
- Order: Coleoptera
- Suborder: Polyphaga
- Infraorder: Cucujiformia
- Superfamily: Coccinelloidea
- Family: Coccinellidae
- Subfamily: Coccinellinae
- Tribe: Coccinellini
- Genus: Neoharmonia; Crotch, 1871

Synonyms
- Agrabia Casey, 1899; Harmoniaspis Casey, 1908

= Neoharmonia =

Genus of beetles

Neoharmonia is a genus of lady beetles in the family Coccinellidae.

== Species ==
- Neoharmonia erythroptera (Mulsant, 1850)
- Neoharmonia marginalis (Mulsant, 1850)
- Neoharmonia solanoi González, 2018
- Neoharmonia venusta (Melsheimer, 1847)
- Neoharmonia zischkai (Mader, 1950)
