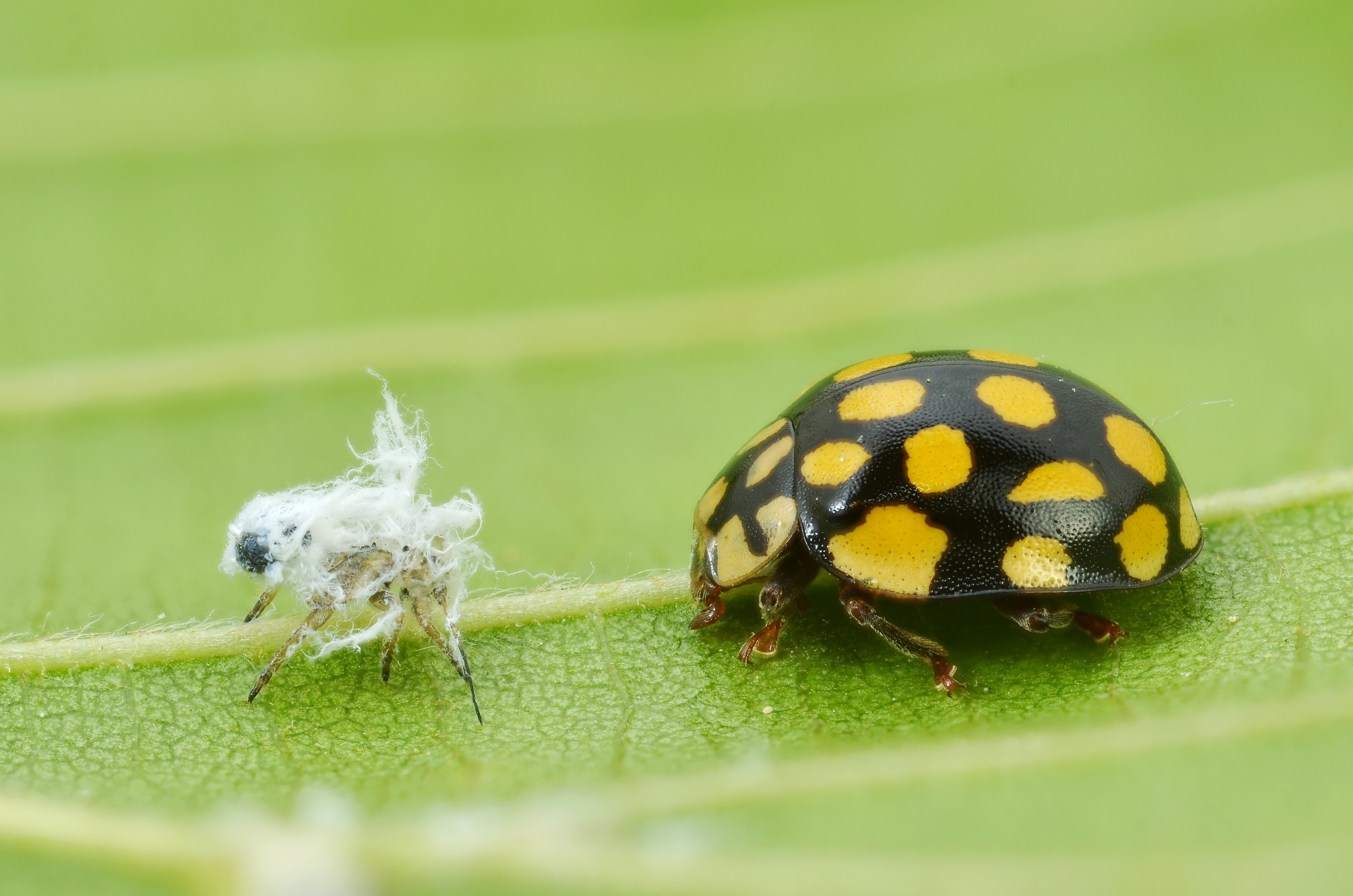
- Sospita vigintiguttata

Scientific classification
- Kingdom: Animalia
- Phylum: Arthropoda
- Clade: Pancrustacea
- Class: Insecta
- Order: Coleoptera
- Suborder: Polyphaga
- Infraorder: Cucujiformia
- Family: Coccinellidae
- Subfamily: Coccinellinae
- Tribe: Coccinellini
- Genus: Sospita; Mulsant, 1846

Type species
- Coccinella vigintiguttata Linnaeus, 1758

= Sospita (beetle) =

Genus of ladybird beetles

Sospita is a genus of ladybird beetle with two species, S. sexvittata and S. vigintiguttata. They have a Palearctic distribution. Another species described as Sospita quadrivittata is now placed in the genus Miyataketentou.
