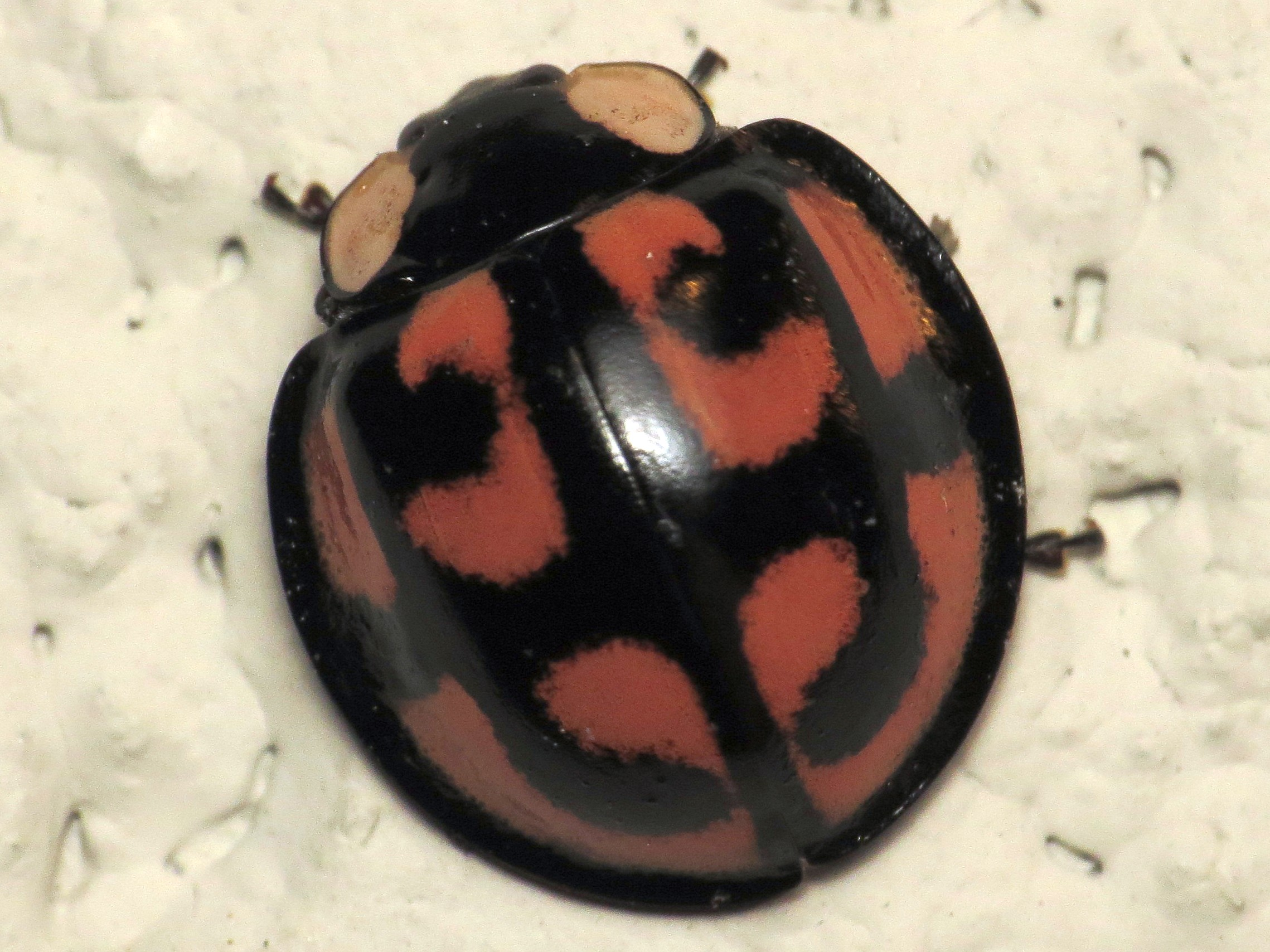
- Adult Aiolocaria hexaspilota

Scientific classification
- Kingdom: Animalia
- Phylum: Arthropoda
- Clade: Pancrustacea
- Class: Insecta
- Order: Coleoptera
- Suborder: Polyphaga
- Infraorder: Cucujiformia
- Family: Coccinellidae
- Tribe: Coccinellini
- Genus: Aiolocaria; Crotch, 1871
- Species: A. hexaspilota

Binomial name
- Aiolocaria hexaspilota (Hope, 1831)

Synonyms
- Coccinella 6-spilota Hope, 1831; Leis mirabilis Motschulsky, 1860; Aiolocaria mirabilis; Ithone hexaspilota var. nigra Gadeau de Kerville, 1884; Ithone hexaspilota var. aethiops Weise, 1885; Ithone degenerata Semenov, 1889

= Aiolocaria =

Genus of beetles

Aiolocaria hexaspilota is a beetle species from the lady beetle family (Coccinellidae); adults can be as large as 13mm long. The species’ scientific name was first given in an 1831 publication by Frederick William Hope. Unaware of its previous identification, Victor Motschulsky was later to call the same species as Aiolocaria mirabilis (in 1860). In most cases of such synonymy, according to the Encyclopedia of Life, “the first name takes priority and is considered to be the valid or accepted name.”

Entomologists Ivo Hodek (Czech Institute of Entomology) and Edward W. Evans (Utah State University) describe the species as “a specialized predator of chrysomelids.” Entomologist G. I. Savoiskaya has observed Aiolocaria hexaspilota actively pursuing larval prey.

Ivo Hodek has also described the species as univoltine (having one brood per year); in early autumn they migrate from sun-exposed forest habitat “to well-insolated slopes of rocky hills or also to buildings.” Seeking winter shelter in rocky crevices or, opportunistically, in human dwellings, the beetles will cluster in aggregations of up to several hundred individuals. Hodek notes that by clustering together they maintain a temperature “much higher than ambient” and that in the spring the adults mate and disperse.
