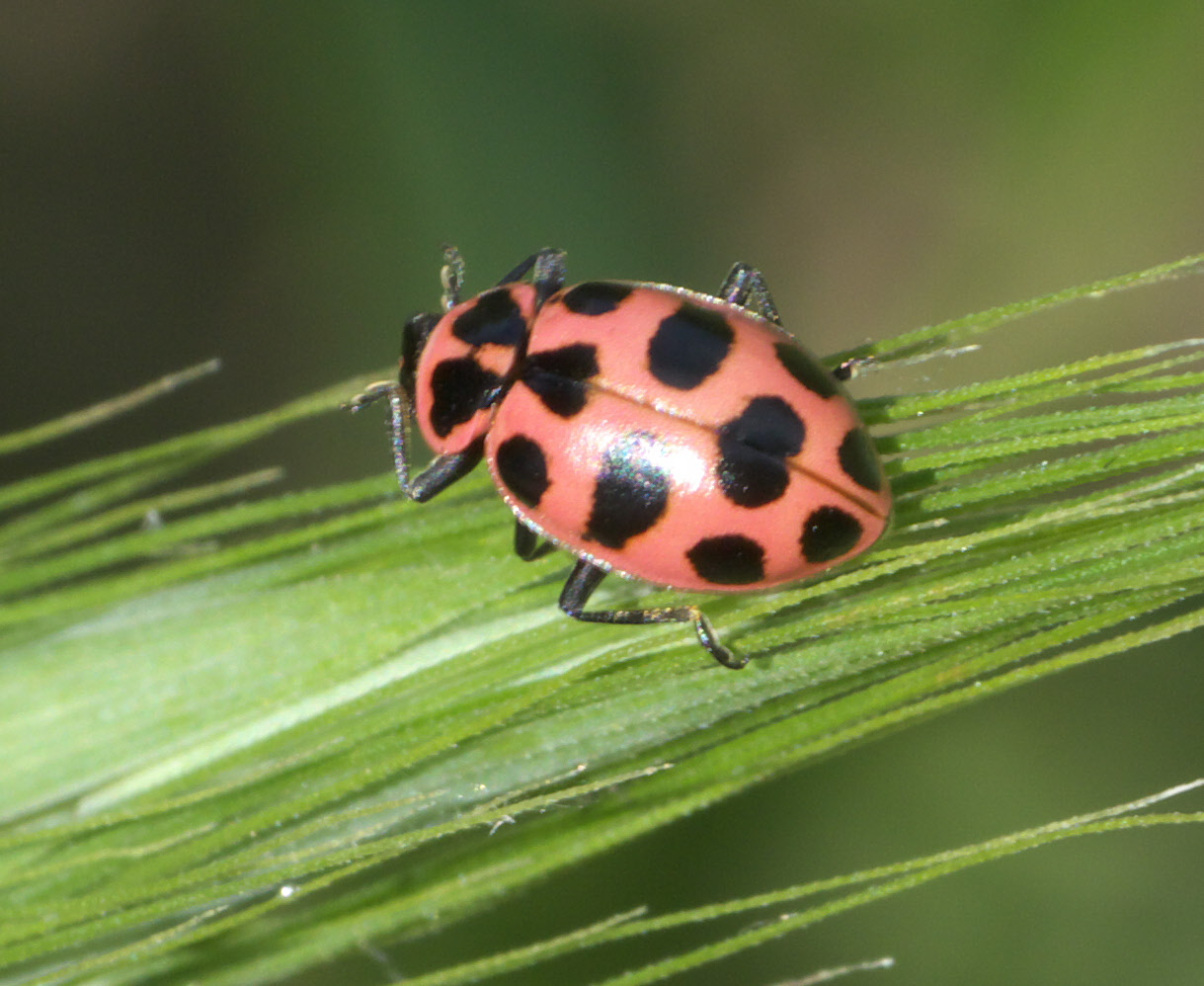
- Coleomegilla maculata

Scientific classification
- Kingdom: Animalia
- Phylum: Arthropoda
- Clade: Pancrustacea
- Class: Insecta
- Order: Coleoptera
- Suborder: Polyphaga
- Infraorder: Cucujiformia
- Family: Coccinellidae
- Tribe: Coccinellini
- Genus: Coleomegilla; Timberlake, 1920

Synonyms
- Megilla Mulsant, 1850 (preocc.)

= Coleomegilla =

Genus of beetles

Coleomegilla is a genus of lady beetles in the family Coccinellidae. There are at least two described species in Coleomegilla.

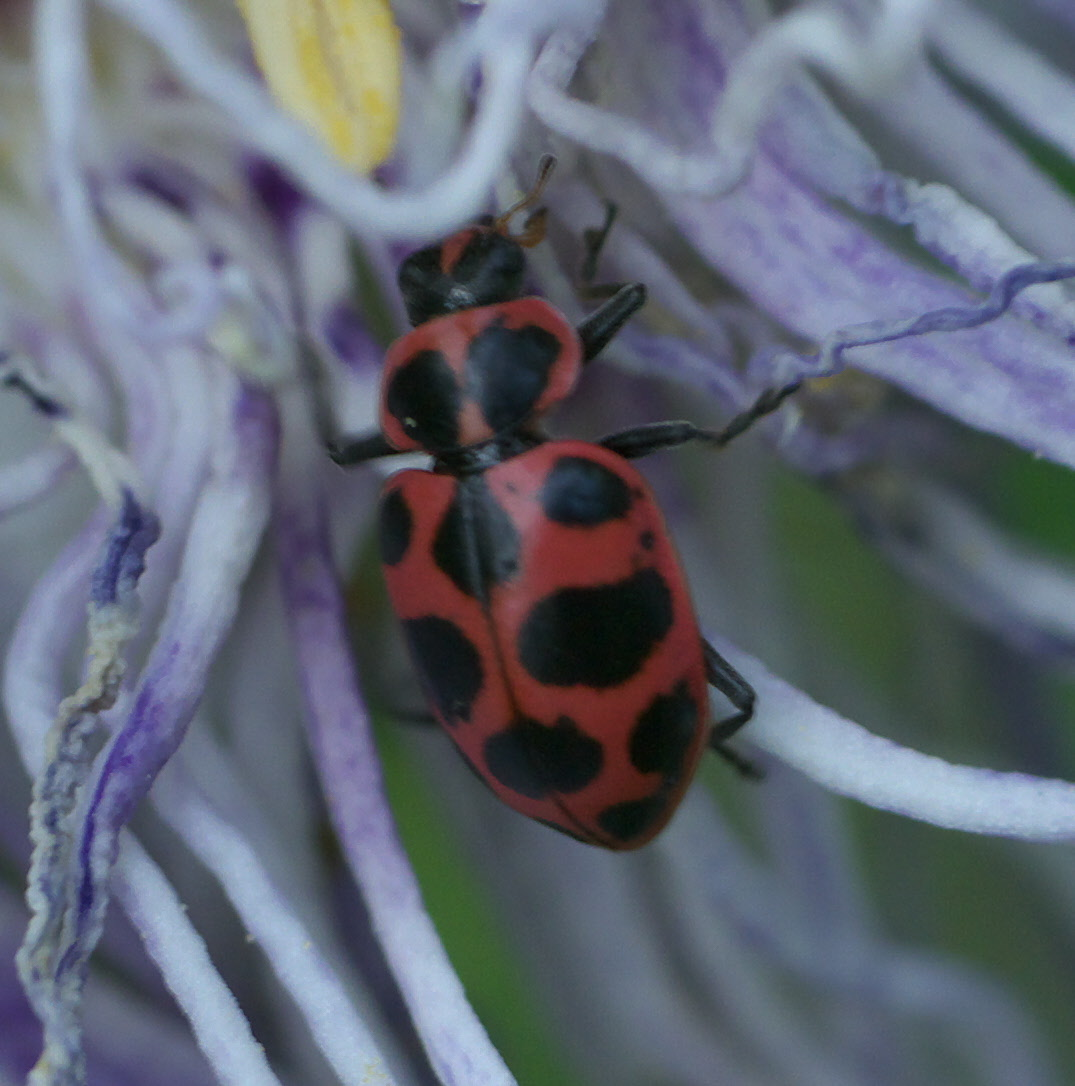
Coleomegilla maculata

== Species ==
These species belong to the genus Coleomegilla:

- Coleomegilla cubensis (Casey, 1908)
- Coleomegilla innotata (Mulsant, 1850)
- Coleomegilla maculata (De Geer, 1775) (pink spotted lady beetle)
- Coleomegilla occulta González, 2014
- Coleomegilla quadrifasciata (Thunberg, 1808)
