= Aaages =

Scientific classification
- Kingdom: Animalia
- Phylum: Arthropoda
- Clade: Pancrustacea
- Class: Insecta
- Order: Coleoptera
- Suborder: Polyphaga
- Infraorder: Cucujiformia
- Family: Coccinellidae
- Genus: Aaages; Barovskiĭ, 1926
- Species: A. prior

Binomial name
- Aaages prior Barovskiĭ, 1926

Synonyms
- Aages, Aasges, Aaagu

Genus of beetles

Aaages is a genus of beetle in the family Coccinellidae (ladybird beetles, or ladybugs). There is only one species in this genus, Aaages prior, which has frequently been misspelled in the subsequent literature.
