= Olla (beetle) =

Scientific classification
- Kingdom: Animalia
- Phylum: Arthropoda
- Clade: Pancrustacea
- Class: Insecta
- Order: Coleoptera
- Suborder: Polyphaga
- Infraorder: Cucujiformia
- Family: Coccinellidae
- Tribe: Coccinellini
- Genus: Olla; Casey, 1899

Genus of beetles

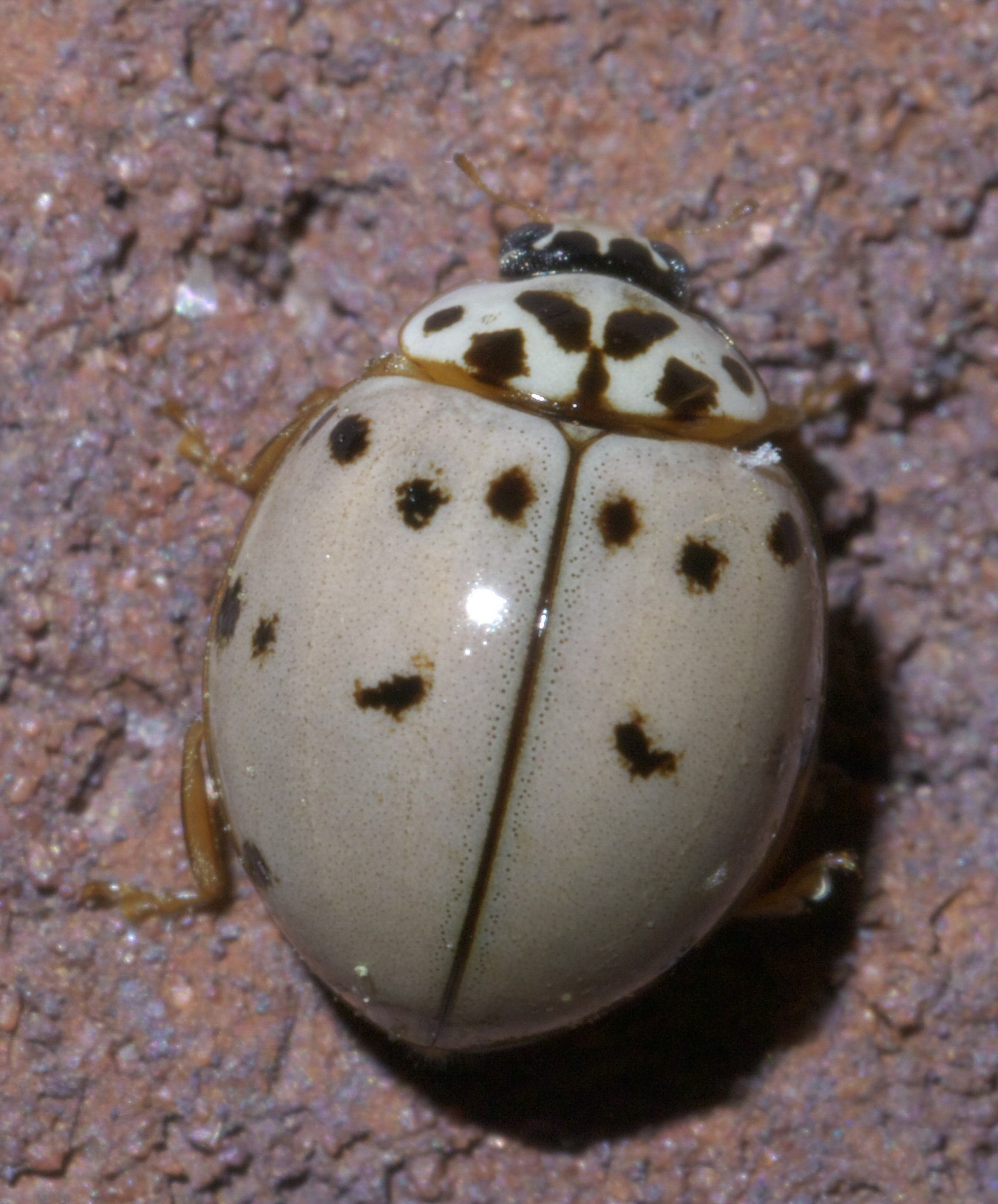
Olla v-nigrum, Ashy Gray Lady Beetle

Olla is a genus of lady beetles in the family Coccinellidae.

== Species ==
- Olla gorhami Casey, 1908
- Olla hageni Vandenberg, 1992
- Olla lacrimosa Vandenberg, 2004
- Olla roatanensis Vandenberg, 1992
- Olla timberlakei Vandenberg, 1992
- Olla v-nigrum (Mulsant, 1866)
