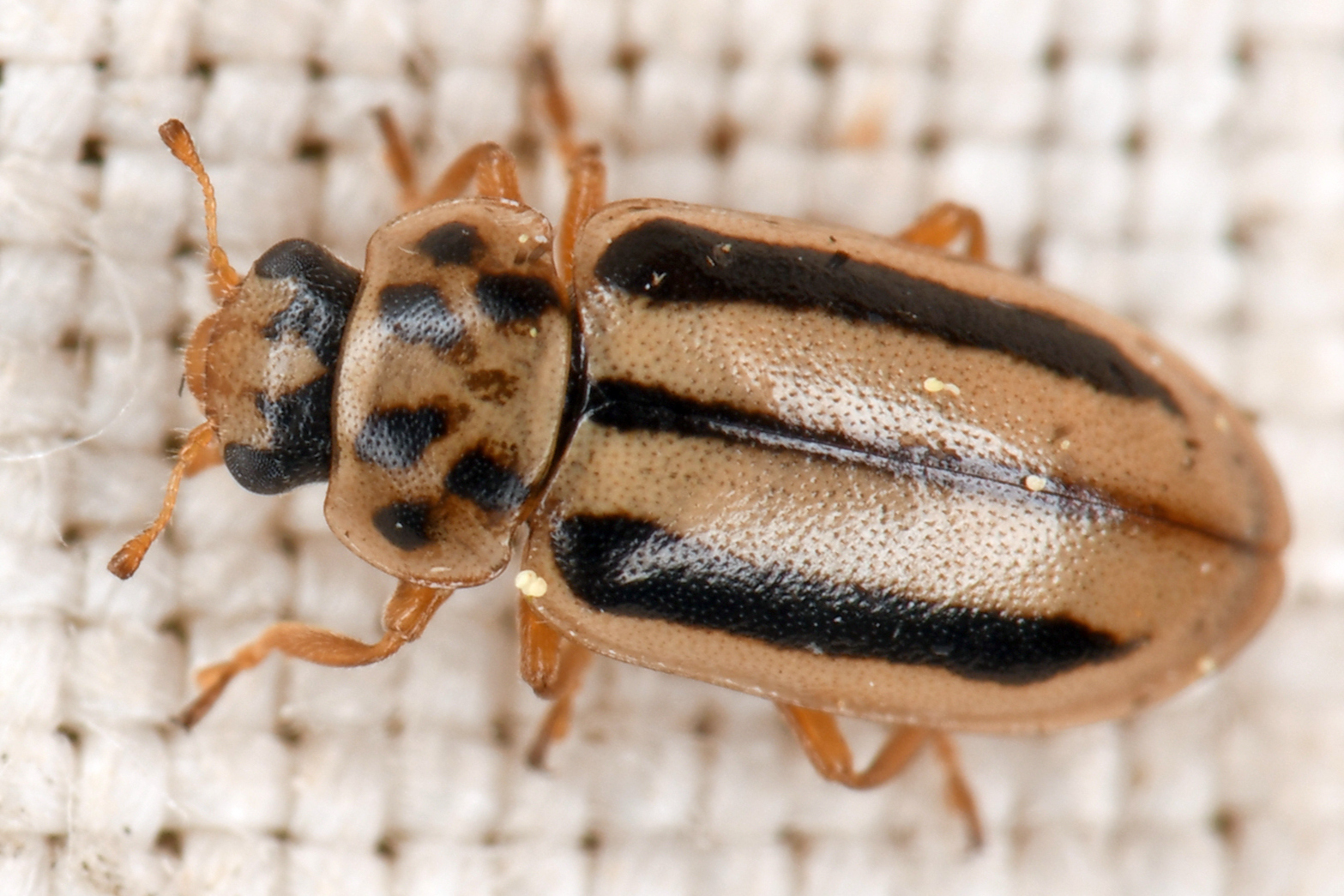
- Macronaemia episcopalis

Scientific classification
- Kingdom: Animalia
- Phylum: Arthropoda
- Clade: Pancrustacea
- Class: Insecta
- Order: Coleoptera
- Suborder: Polyphaga
- Infraorder: Cucujiformia
- Family: Coccinellidae
- Tribe: Coccinellini
- Genus: Macronaemia; Casey, 1899

= Macronaemia =

Genus of beetles

Macronaemia is a genus of lady beetles in the family Coccinellidae, with three described species recognized, when formerly there was only one.

== Species ==
- Macronaemia episcopalis (Kirby, 1837)
- Macronaemia hauseri (Weise, 1905)
- Macronaemia paradoxa (Mader, 1947)
