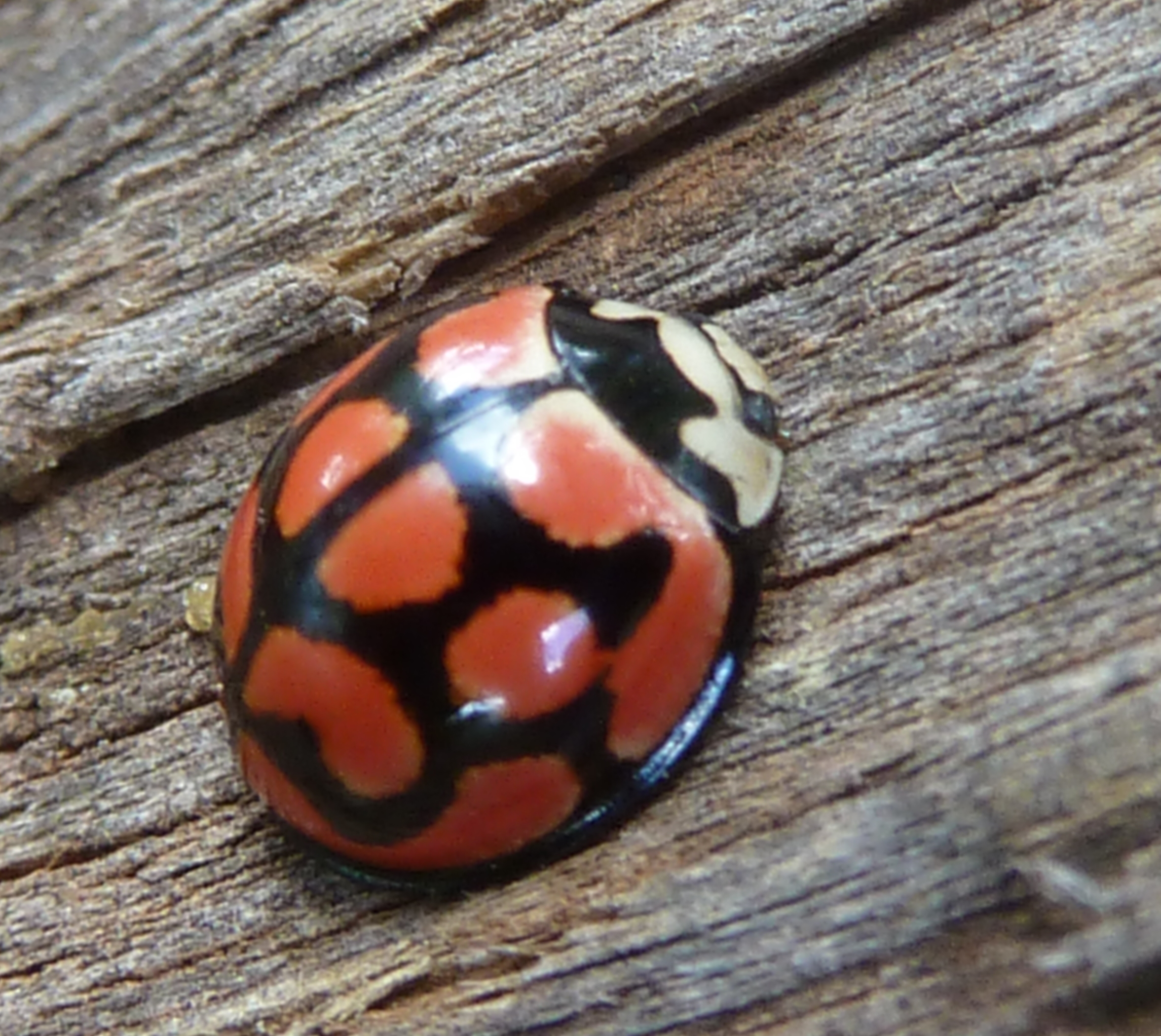
- Adult Cheilomenes lunata

Scientific classification
- Kingdom: Animalia
- Phylum: Arthropoda
- Clade: Pancrustacea
- Class: Insecta
- Order: Coleoptera
- Suborder: Polyphaga
- Infraorder: Cucujiformia
- Family: Coccinellidae
- Subfamily: Coccinellinae; Latreille, 1807

= Coccinellinae =

Subfamily of beetles

Coccinellinae is a subfamily of lady beetles in the family Coccinellidae. There are at least 20 genera and 90 described species in Coccinellinae.

== Tribes ==
After the most recent revision, the subfamily consists of the following tribes: (Stethorini) – Coccinellini – (Chnoodini) – Ortaliini – Epilachnini – Noviini – Scymnini – Cryptognathini – Cephaloscymnini – Platynaspidini – Aspidimerini – Hyperaspidini – (Brachiacanthini) – Diomini – (Poriini) – (Pentiliini) – Azyini – Argentipilosini – Chilocorini – Plotinini – Sumniini – Sticholotidini – (Cranophorini) – Coccidulini – Shirozuellini – (Scymnillini) - Platynaspidini

== Genera ==
Coccinellinae includes these genera:

- Adalia Mulsant, 1846^{i c g b}
- Aiolocaria (Crotch, 1871)^{g}
- Anatis Mulsant, 1846^{i c g b} (giant lady beetles)
- Anisosticta Chevrolat in Dejean, 1837^{i c g b}
- Aphidecta Weise, 1893^{i c g b}
- Calvia Mulsant, 1850^{i c g b}
- Ceratomegilla Crotch, 1873^{i c g b}
- Cheilomenes Chevrolat in Dejean, 1837^{i c g}
- Coccinella Linnaeus, 1758^{i c g b}
- Coelophora Mulsant, 1850^{i c g b}
- Coleomegilla Timberlake, 1920^{i c g b}
- Cycloneda Crotch, 1871^{i c g b} (spotless lady beetles)
- Harmonia Mulsant, 1850^{i c g b}
- Hippodamia Chevrolat in Dejean, 1837^{i c g b}
- Macronaemia Casey, 1899^{i c g b}
- Megalocaria Crotch, 1871^{i c g}
- Micraspis Chevrolat in Dejean, 1837^{i c g}
- Mulsantina Weise, 1906^{i c g b}
- Myzia Mulsant, 1846^{i c g b}
- Naemia Mulsant, 1850^{i c g b}
- Neda Mulsant, 1850^{g b}
- Neoharmonia Crotch, 1871^{i c g b}
- Olla Casey, 1899^{i c g b}
- Paranaemia Casey, 1899^{i c g b}
- Propylea Mulsant, 1846^{g b}
- Psyllobora Chevrolat in Dejean, 1837^{i c g b} (fungus-eating lady beetles)
- Synonycha Chevrolat in Dejean, 1837^{i c g}
- Verania Mulsant, 1850^{i c g}

Data sources: i = ITIS, c = Catalogue of Life, g = GBIF, b = Bugguide.net

== Gallery ==
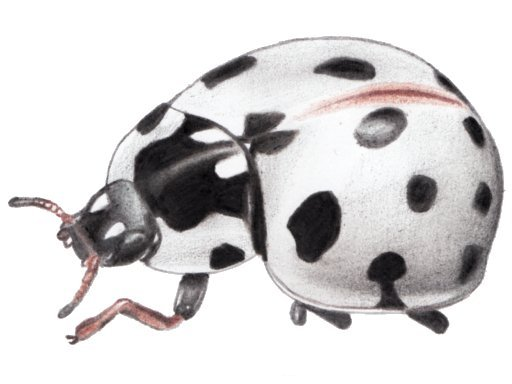
Anatis labiculata

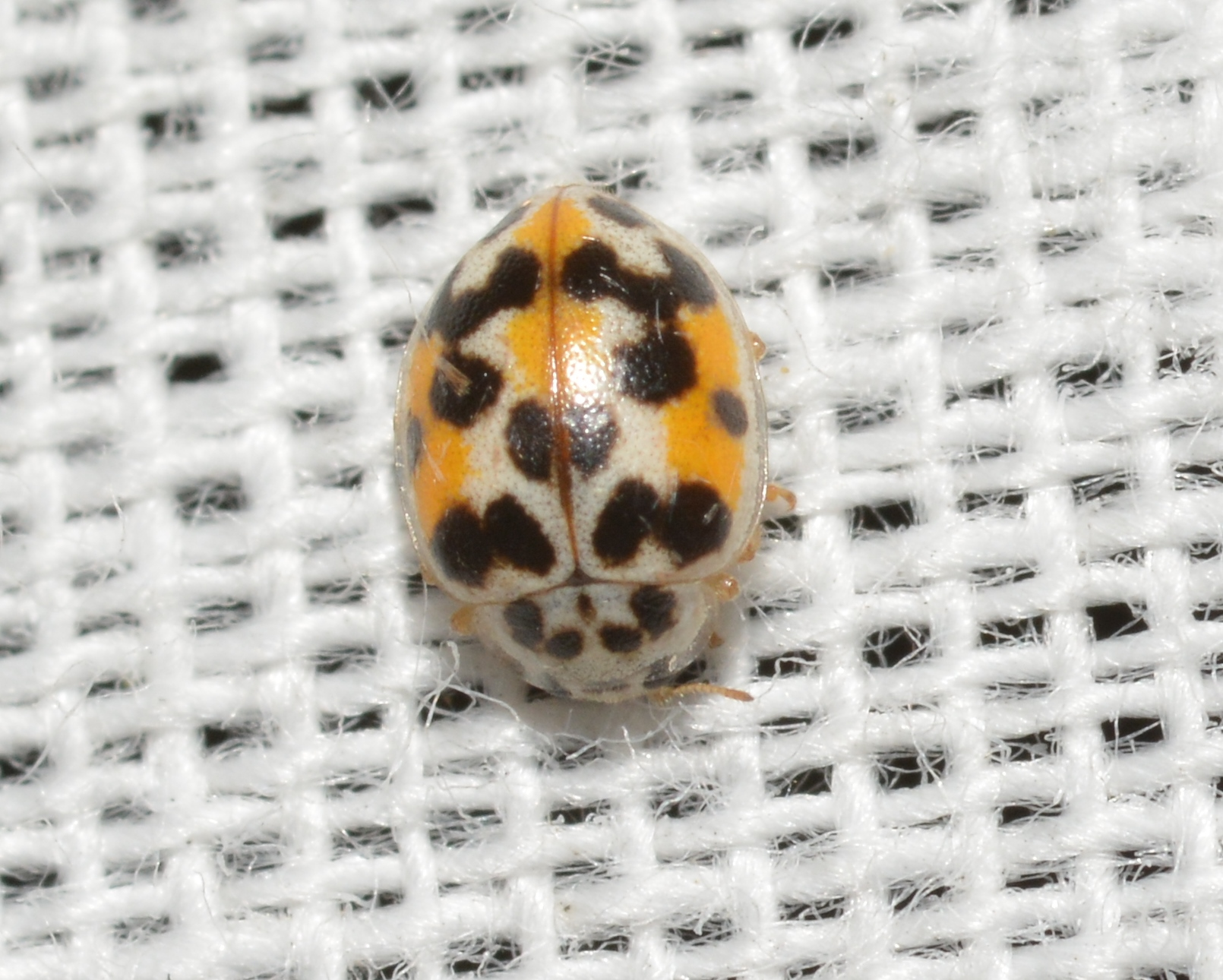
Psyllobora vigintimaculata

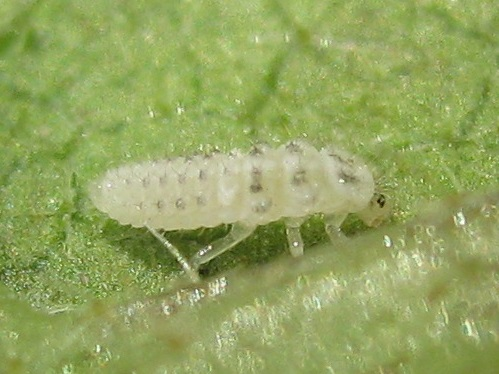
Psyllobora vigintimaculata, larva
