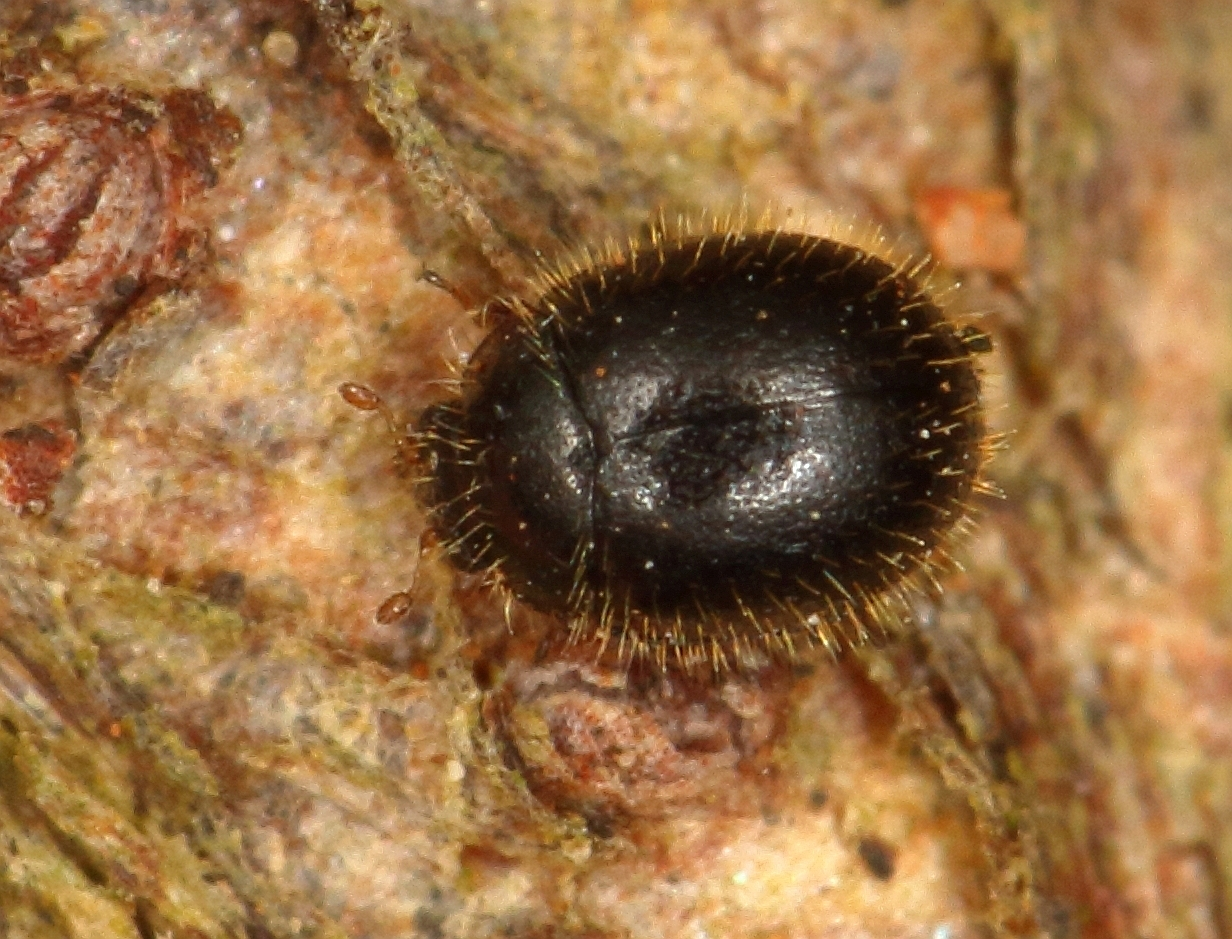
- Microfreudea cyclica

Scientific classification
- Kingdom: Animalia
- Phylum: Arthropoda
- Clade: Pancrustacea
- Class: Insecta
- Order: Coleoptera
- Suborder: Polyphaga
- Infraorder: Cucujiformia
- Family: Coccinellidae
- Subfamily: Sticholotidinae; Weise, 1901

Tribes
- Cephaloscymnini; Plotinini; Shirozuellini; Sticholotidini; Sukunahikonini

= Sticholotidinae =

Subfamily of beetles

Sticholotidinae was a subfamily of beetles in the family Coccinellidae (lady beetles). Phylogenetic analysis found the subfamily is not a clade and thus invalid.
