= Cephaloscymnus laevis =

Scientific classification
- Kingdom: Animalia
- Phylum: Arthropoda
- Clade: Pancrustacea
- Class: Insecta
- Order: Coleoptera
- Suborder: Polyphaga
- Infraorder: Cucujiformia
- Family: Coccinellidae
- Genus: Cephaloscymnus
- Species: C. laevis

Binomial name
- Cephaloscymnus laevis Gordon, 1970

Species of beetle

Cephaloscymnus laevis is a species of beetle of the family Coccinellidae. It is found in North America, where it has been recorded from Arizona, as well as from Hidalgo (Mexico).

== Description ==
Adults reach a length of about 2 mm. They have a light brown body, while the pronotum is reddish.
