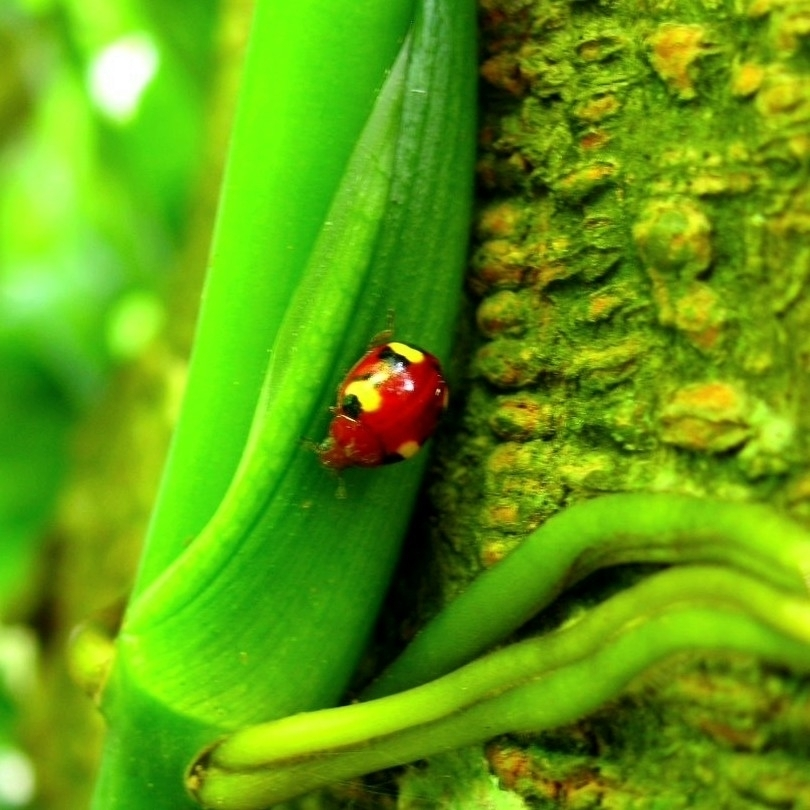

Scientific classification
- Kingdom: Animalia
- Phylum: Arthropoda
- Clade: Pancrustacea
- Class: Insecta
- Order: Coleoptera
- Suborder: Polyphaga
- Infraorder: Cucujiformia
- Family: Coccinellidae
- Genus: Buprestodera
- Species: B. mimetica

Binomial name
- Buprestodera mimetica Sicard, 1911

= Buprestodera mimetica =

Species of beetle

Buprestodera mimetica is a species of beetle of the family Coccinellidae. It is found in India (Karnataka, Kerala, Tamil Nadu, Maharashtra).

== Description ==
Adults reach a length of about 4.1–4.7 mm (0.16–0.19 in). They are bright reddish orange, each elytron with a small black spot and an adjoining yellow spot, as well as two small black spots with a transverse yellow spot between them in the posterior half.
