= Prodilis monique =

Scientific classification
- Kingdom: Animalia
- Phylum: Arthropoda
- Clade: Pancrustacea
- Class: Insecta
- Order: Coleoptera
- Suborder: Polyphaga
- Infraorder: Cucujiformia
- Family: Coccinellidae
- Genus: Prodilis
- Species: P. monique

Binomial name
- Prodilis monique Gordon & Hanley, 2017

Species of beetle

Prodilis monique is a species of beetle of the family Coccinellidae. It is found in Brazil.

== Description ==
Adults reach a length of about 2 mm. Adults are black, the head with two yellow spots. The pronotum is dark brown, while the lateral one-fourth is reddish yellow. The elytron has a yellow spot.
