= Prodilis qedi =

Scientific classification
- Kingdom: Animalia
- Phylum: Arthropoda
- Clade: Pancrustacea
- Class: Insecta
- Order: Coleoptera
- Suborder: Polyphaga
- Infraorder: Cucujiformia
- Family: Coccinellidae
- Genus: Prodilis
- Species: P. qedi

Binomial name
- Prodilis qedi González & Větrovec, 2021

Species of beetle

Prodilis qedi is a species of beetle of the family Coccinellidae. It is found in Panama.

== Description ==
Adults reach a length of about 2.4 mm (0.094 in). The head is bright blue, with a yellow marking. The antennae are yellow and the pronotum is bluish black, with the anterior half of the lateral border and the anterior angles dark brown. The elytra are bluish black, with a purple shine, and the anterior third with dark brown lateral borders. The ventral surface is mostly black, and the abdomen is mostly brown. The legs are yellow. The pubescence is white.

== Etymology ==
The species is dedicated to the Czech scientist in the field of psychology, Radvan 'QED' Bahbouh.
