= Neaporia misty =

Scientific classification
- Kingdom: Animalia
- Phylum: Arthropoda
- Clade: Pancrustacea
- Class: Insecta
- Order: Coleoptera
- Suborder: Polyphaga
- Infraorder: Cucujiformia
- Family: Coccinellidae
- Genus: Neaporia
- Species: N. misty

Binomial name
- Neaporia misty Gordon & Hanley, 2017

Species of beetle

Neaporia misty is a species of beetle of the family Coccinellidae. It is found in Venezuela.

== Description ==
Adults reach a length of about 2.1–2.2 mm. Adults are light brown, while the head is black with a bluish tint. The medial area of the pronotum is black with a bluish tint, while the lateral one-third is yellowish brown. The elytron has a bluish metallic tint and two small pale yellow spots.
