= Prodilis plagioderina =

Scientific classification
- Kingdom: Animalia
- Phylum: Arthropoda
- Clade: Pancrustacea
- Class: Insecta
- Order: Coleoptera
- Suborder: Polyphaga
- Infraorder: Cucujiformia
- Family: Coccinellidae
- Genus: Prodilis
- Species: P. plagioderina

Binomial name
- Prodilis plagioderina (Gorham, 1897)

Synonyms
- Neaporia plagioderina Gorham, 1897

Species of beetle

Prodilis plagioderina is a species of beetle of the family Coccinellidae. It is found in Panama.

== Description ==
Adults reach a length of about 3.4 mm. Adults are black with a bluish tint, while the head is mostly yellow with black areas. The pronotum is yellow with a dark brown spot.
