= Neaporia tracey =

Scientific classification
- Kingdom: Animalia
- Phylum: Arthropoda
- Clade: Pancrustacea
- Class: Insecta
- Order: Coleoptera
- Suborder: Polyphaga
- Infraorder: Cucujiformia
- Family: Coccinellidae
- Genus: Neaporia
- Species: N. tracey

Binomial name
- Neaporia tracey Gordon & Hanley, 2017

Species of beetle

Neaporia tracey is a species of beetle of the family Coccinellidae. It is found in Bolivia.

== Description ==
Adults reach a length of about 1.3 mm. Adults are dark brown, the head with a yellow spot. The lateral margin of the pronotum is reddish brown.
