= Sphaeroplotina hainanensis =

Scientific classification
- Kingdom: Animalia
- Phylum: Arthropoda
- Clade: Pancrustacea
- Class: Insecta
- Order: Coleoptera
- Suborder: Polyphaga
- Infraorder: Cucujiformia
- Family: Coccinellidae
- Genus: Sphaeroplotina
- Species: S. hainanensis

Binomial name
- Sphaeroplotina hainanensis Miyatake, 1969

Species of beetle

Sphaeroplotina hainanensis is a species of beetle of the family Coccinellidae. It is found in China (Hainan).

== Description ==
Adults reach a length of about 3.75 mm (0.148 in). The dorsal surface is strongly shiny and almost glabrous. The head is reddish brown, with the antennae yellowish brown. The pronotum is reddish brown with yellowish sides and a pitchy-black band on the basal half. The scutellum is pitchy brown and the elytra are yellow with a reddish testaceous median band, sutural, basal and lateral margins. Each elytron has six black spots.
