= Prodilis blanche =

Scientific classification
- Kingdom: Animalia
- Phylum: Arthropoda
- Clade: Pancrustacea
- Class: Insecta
- Order: Coleoptera
- Suborder: Polyphaga
- Infraorder: Cucujiformia
- Family: Coccinellidae
- Genus: Prodilis
- Species: P. blanche

Binomial name
- Prodilis blanche Gordon & Hanley, 2017

Species of beetle

Prodilis blanche is a species of beetle of the family Coccinellidae. It is found in Argentina.

== Description ==
Adults reach a length of about 2.4 mm. Adults are dark brown with a mostly yellow head with some black areas. The pronotum is black with a reddish yellow lateral border and anterolateral angle.
