= Neaporia kristina =

Scientific classification
- Kingdom: Animalia
- Phylum: Arthropoda
- Clade: Pancrustacea
- Class: Insecta
- Order: Coleoptera
- Suborder: Polyphaga
- Infraorder: Cucujiformia
- Family: Coccinellidae
- Genus: Neaporia
- Species: N. kristina

Binomial name
- Neaporia kristina Gordon & Hanley, 2017

Species of beetle

Neaporia kristina is a species of beetle of the family Coccinellidae. It is found in Costa Rica.

== Description ==
Adults reach a length of about 2.1–2.6 mm. Adults are red, although the head and pronotum are black with a greenish tint. The elytron has a greenish black spot.
