= Plotina octomaculata =

Scientific classification
- Kingdom: Animalia
- Phylum: Arthropoda
- Clade: Pancrustacea
- Class: Insecta
- Order: Coleoptera
- Suborder: Polyphaga
- Infraorder: Cucujiformia
- Family: Coccinellidae
- Genus: Plotina
- Species: P. octomaculata

Binomial name
- Plotina octomaculata Wang & Ren, 2011

Species of beetle

Plotina octomaculata is a species of beetle of the family Coccinellidae. It is found in India (Meghalaya) and China (Tibet).

== Description ==
Adults reach a length of about 2.42 mm (0.095 in). The head, pronotum and scutellum are reddish brown, while the elytra are dark reddish brown with four pale yellowish spots with connected black halos.
