= Prodilis guadalupe =

Scientific classification
- Kingdom: Animalia
- Phylum: Arthropoda
- Clade: Pancrustacea
- Class: Insecta
- Order: Coleoptera
- Suborder: Polyphaga
- Infraorder: Cucujiformia
- Family: Coccinellidae
- Genus: Prodilis
- Species: P. guadalupe

Binomial name
- Prodilis guadalupe Gordon & Hanley, 2017

Species of beetle

Prodilis guadalupe is a species of beetle of the family Coccinellidae. It is found in Venezuela.

== Description ==
Adults reach a length of about 2 mm. Adults are bluish black, the head partly reddish yellow and yellow. The pronotum is black with the lateral one-fourth reddish brown.
