= Neaporia hilda =

Scientific classification
- Kingdom: Animalia
- Phylum: Arthropoda
- Clade: Pancrustacea
- Class: Insecta
- Order: Coleoptera
- Suborder: Polyphaga
- Infraorder: Cucujiformia
- Family: Coccinellidae
- Genus: Neaporia
- Species: N. hilda

Binomial name
- Neaporia hilda Gordon & Hanley, 2017

Species of beetle

Neaporia hilda is a species of beetle of the family Coccinellidae. It is found in Colombia.

== Description ==
Adults reach a length of about 2.0–2.1 mm. Adults are black, the pronotum with a greenish tint and a reddish yellow lateral margin. The elytron has two reddish yellow spots.
