= Prodilis belinda =

Scientific classification
- Kingdom: Animalia
- Phylum: Arthropoda
- Clade: Pancrustacea
- Class: Insecta
- Order: Coleoptera
- Suborder: Polyphaga
- Infraorder: Cucujiformia
- Family: Coccinellidae
- Genus: Prodilis
- Species: P. belinda

Binomial name
- Prodilis belinda Gordon & Hanley, 2017

Species of beetle

Prodilis belinda is a species of beetle of the family Coccinellidae. It is found in Colombia.

== Description ==
Adults reach a length of about 2.3 mm. Adults are black, the head with a yellow marking. The pronotum is black with a reddish brown lateral margin. The elytron has two yellow spots.
