= Neaporia gwendolyn =

Scientific classification
- Kingdom: Animalia
- Phylum: Arthropoda
- Clade: Pancrustacea
- Class: Insecta
- Order: Coleoptera
- Suborder: Polyphaga
- Infraorder: Cucujiformia
- Family: Coccinellidae
- Genus: Neaporia
- Species: N. gwendolyn

Binomial name
- Neaporia gwendolyn Gordon & Hanley, 2017

Species of beetle

Neaporia gwendolyn is a species of beetle of the family Coccinellidae. It is found in Venezuela.

== Description ==
Adults reach a length of about 2 mm. Adults are light brown with a dark brown head. The lateral margin of the pronotum is yellow. The elytron has a yellow vitta.
