= Paraplotina flavomaculata =

Scientific classification
- Kingdom: Animalia
- Phylum: Arthropoda
- Clade: Pancrustacea
- Class: Insecta
- Order: Coleoptera
- Suborder: Polyphaga
- Infraorder: Cucujiformia
- Family: Coccinellidae
- Genus: Paraplotina
- Species: P. flavomaculata

Binomial name
- Paraplotina flavomaculata Miyatake, 1969

Species of beetle

Paraplotina flavomaculata is a species of beetle of the family Coccinellidae. It is found in India (Tamil Nadu).

== Description ==
Adults reach a length of about 3.4 mm (0.13 in). They are black and strongly shiny, with the antennae mostly pitchy brown. The elytra each have two yellowish-orange spots. The ventral surface and the legs are black to blackish piceous.
