= Prodilis katrina =

Scientific classification
- Kingdom: Animalia
- Phylum: Arthropoda
- Clade: Pancrustacea
- Class: Insecta
- Order: Coleoptera
- Suborder: Polyphaga
- Infraorder: Cucujiformia
- Family: Coccinellidae
- Genus: Prodilis
- Species: P. katrina

Binomial name
- Prodilis katrina Gordon & Hanley, 2017

Species of beetle

Prodilis katrina is a species of beetle of the family Coccinellidae. It is found in Brazil.

== Description ==
Adults reach a length of about 2.3–2.5 mm. Adults are bluish black. The basal third of the head is reddish yellow, while the remainder is yellow. The pronotum is reddish yellow, although the lateral one-eight is yellow. The lateral margin of the elytron is reddish brown.
