= Neaporia metallica =

Scientific classification
- Kingdom: Animalia
- Phylum: Arthropoda
- Clade: Pancrustacea
- Class: Insecta
- Order: Coleoptera
- Suborder: Polyphaga
- Infraorder: Cucujiformia
- Family: Coccinellidae
- Genus: Neaporia
- Species: N. metallica

Binomial name
- Neaporia metallica Gorham, 1899

Species of beetle

Neaporia metallica is a species of beetle of the family Coccinellidae. It is found in Panama.

== Description ==
Adults reach a length of about 2.0–2.3 mm. Adults are greenish to bluish black. The elytron has a reddish yellow spot.
