= Plotina versicolor =

Scientific classification
- Kingdom: Animalia
- Phylum: Arthropoda
- Clade: Pancrustacea
- Class: Insecta
- Order: Coleoptera
- Suborder: Polyphaga
- Infraorder: Cucujiformia
- Family: Coccinellidae
- Genus: Plotina
- Species: P. versicolor

Binomial name
- Plotina versicolor Lewis, 1896

Species of beetle

Plotina versicolor is a species of beetle of the family Coccinellidae. It is found in Japan (Honshu, Shikoku) and China (Fujian).

== Description ==
Adults reach a length of about 2.5–3 mm (0.098–0.118 in). They are reddish brown and strongly shiny, with the antennae deep yellowish brown. The sides of the pronotum are somewhat yellowish and have a blackish patch before the scutellum, which is divided by a reddish line. The scutellum is piceous or dark reddish brown and the elytra are deep yellow, with a reddish testaceous or reddish orange band and sutural vitta, as well as ten blackish spots.
