= Cephaloscymnus australis =

Scientific classification
- Kingdom: Animalia
- Phylum: Arthropoda
- Clade: Pancrustacea
- Class: Insecta
- Order: Coleoptera
- Suborder: Polyphaga
- Infraorder: Cucujiformia
- Family: Coccinellidae
- Genus: Cephaloscymnus
- Species: C. australis

Binomial name
- Cephaloscymnus australis Gordon, 1970

Synonyms
- Cephaloscymnus zimmermanni australis Gordon, 1970

Species of beetle

Cephaloscymnus australis is a species of beetle of the family Coccinellidae. It is found in North America, where it has been recorded from Arizona, New Mexico and Texas, as well as from Monterrey (Mexico).

== Description ==
Adults reach a length of about 2.20-2.36 mm. They have a piceous to brown body.
