= Prodilis cora =

Scientific classification
- Kingdom: Animalia
- Phylum: Arthropoda
- Clade: Pancrustacea
- Class: Insecta
- Order: Coleoptera
- Suborder: Polyphaga
- Infraorder: Cucujiformia
- Family: Coccinellidae
- Genus: Prodilis
- Species: P. cora

Binomial name
- Prodilis cora Gordon & Hanley, 2017

Species of beetle

Prodilis cora is a species of beetle of the family Coccinellidae. It is found in Brazil.

== Description ==
Adults reach a length of about 2.4 mm. Adults are black and the head is mostly yellow with some black areas. The lateral margin and anterolateral angle of the pronotum are yellow, while the lateral margin of the elytron is reddish brown.
