= Prodilis harriet =

Scientific classification
- Kingdom: Animalia
- Phylum: Arthropoda
- Clade: Pancrustacea
- Class: Insecta
- Order: Coleoptera
- Suborder: Polyphaga
- Infraorder: Cucujiformia
- Family: Coccinellidae
- Genus: Prodilis
- Species: P. harriet

Binomial name
- Prodilis harriet Gordon & Hanley, 2017

Species of beetle

Prodilis harriet is a species of beetle of the family Coccinellidae. It is found in Suriname.

== Description ==
Adults reach a length of about 1.7 mm. Adults are reddish brown, the head is mostly yellow with some reddish brown areas. The pronotum is dark reddish brown medially, while the lateral one-third is yellowish brown. The elytron has two yellow spots.
