= Neaporia margie =

Scientific classification
- Kingdom: Animalia
- Phylum: Arthropoda
- Clade: Pancrustacea
- Class: Insecta
- Order: Coleoptera
- Suborder: Polyphaga
- Infraorder: Cucujiformia
- Family: Coccinellidae
- Genus: Neaporia
- Species: N. margie

Binomial name
- Neaporia margie Gordon & Hanley, 2017

Species of beetle

Neaporia margie is a species of beetle of the family Coccinellidae. It is found in Bolivia.

== Description ==
Adults reach a length of about 1.2 mm. Adults are brown with a black head. The pronotum is dark brown with the lateral one-third a bit paler.
