= Prodilis inez =

Scientific classification
- Kingdom: Animalia
- Phylum: Arthropoda
- Clade: Pancrustacea
- Class: Insecta
- Order: Coleoptera
- Suborder: Polyphaga
- Infraorder: Cucujiformia
- Family: Coccinellidae
- Genus: Prodilis
- Species: P. inez

Binomial name
- Prodilis inez Gordon & Hanley, 2017

Species of beetle

Prodilis inez is a species of beetle of the family Coccinellidae. It is found in Bolivia.

== Description ==
Adults reach a length of about 1.3–1.6 mm. Adults are black, the head with two oval yellows spots. The pronotum is black with a yellow lateral border. The elytron has a yellow vitta.
