= Prodilis sheryl =

Scientific classification
- Kingdom: Animalia
- Phylum: Arthropoda
- Clade: Pancrustacea
- Class: Insecta
- Order: Coleoptera
- Suborder: Polyphaga
- Infraorder: Cucujiformia
- Family: Coccinellidae
- Genus: Prodilis
- Species: P. sheryl

Binomial name
- Prodilis sheryl Gordon & Hanley, 2017

Species of beetle

Prodilis sheryl is a species of beetle of the family Coccinellidae. It is found in Colombia.

== Description ==
Adults reach a length of about 2.3 mm. Adults are brownish yellow and the head is mostly yellow with some brown areas. The pronotum has a brown area, surrounded by a yellow border. The elytron is brownish yellow with a brown sutural margin.
