= Prodilis lynda =

Scientific classification
- Kingdom: Animalia
- Phylum: Arthropoda
- Clade: Pancrustacea
- Class: Insecta
- Order: Coleoptera
- Suborder: Polyphaga
- Infraorder: Cucujiformia
- Family: Coccinellidae
- Genus: Prodilis
- Species: P. lynda

Binomial name
- Prodilis lynda Gordon & Hanley, 2017

Species of beetle

Prodilis lynda is a species of beetle of the family Coccinellidae. It is found in Brazil.

== Description ==
Adults reach a length of about 1.8 mm. Adults are brown, while the head is yellow with some black areas. The pronotum is black with blue tinge and the elytron is brown with blue tint.
