= Prodilis =

Scientific classification
- Kingdom: Animalia
- Phylum: Arthropoda
- Clade: Pancrustacea
- Class: Insecta
- Order: Coleoptera
- Suborder: Polyphaga
- Infraorder: Cucujiformia
- Family: Coccinellidae
- Tribe: Cephaloscymnini
- Genus: Prodilis; Mulsant, 1850

Synonyms
- Scymnus (Polius) Mulsant, 1853; Aneaporia Casey 1908; Prodiloides Weise, 1922

Genus of insects

Prodilis is a genus of beetles belonging to the family Coccinellidae.

== Species ==
- Prodilis ada
- Prodilis alberta
- Prodilis alison
- Prodilis amelia
- Prodilis angie
- Prodilis araguaensis
- Prodilis bartletti
- Prodilis belinda
- Prodilis bipunctata
- Prodilis blanche
- Prodilis brandi
- Prodilis cecilia
- Prodilis chiriquensis
- Prodilis claire
- Prodilis compta
- Prodilis cora
- Prodilis cribrata
- Prodilis dubitalis
- Prodilis erika
- Prodilis eunice
- Prodilis fannie
- Prodilis faye
- Prodilis flora
- Prodilis geneva
- Prodilis guadalupe
- Prodilis guatemalana
- Prodilis harriet
- Prodilis hattie
- Prodilis inclyta
- Prodilis indagator
- Prodilis inez
- Prodilis iris
- Prodilis isabel
- Prodilis jan
- Prodilis janie
- Prodilis joanna
- Prodilis jodi
- Prodilis katrina
- Prodilis kristi
- Prodilis kristine
- Prodilis kristy
- Prodilis lindsey
- Prodilis lola
- Prodilis lula
- Prodilis lynda
- Prodilis madeline
- Prodilis maggie
- Prodilis mamie
- Prodilis margarita
- Prodilis maryann
- Prodilis melody
- Prodilis molly
- Prodilis monique
- Prodilis natasha
- Prodilis oblongomaculata
- Prodilis olivia
- Prodilis pallidifrons
- Prodilis pastaza
- Prodilis pecki
- Prodilis plagioderina
- Prodilis pubescens
- Prodilis qedi
- Prodilis ramona
- Prodilis rosie
- Prodilis rugosa
- Prodilis sabrina
- Prodilis sandy
- Prodilis saopaulo
- Prodilis shelley
- Prodilis sherri
- Prodilis sheryl
- Prodilis sonya
- Prodilis susie
- Prodilis unipunctata
- Prodilis volgus
- Prodilis yvette
