= Prodilis yvette =

Scientific classification
- Kingdom: Animalia
- Phylum: Arthropoda
- Clade: Pancrustacea
- Class: Insecta
- Order: Coleoptera
- Suborder: Polyphaga
- Infraorder: Cucujiformia
- Family: Coccinellidae
- Genus: Prodilis
- Species: P. yvette

Binomial name
- Prodilis yvette Gordon & Hanley, 2017

Species of beetle

Prodilis yvette is a species of beetle of the family Coccinellidae. It is found in Peru.

== Description ==
Adults reach a length of about 2.3 mm. Adults are dark blue, with a yellow head and a reddish yellow pronotum.
