= Prodilis compta =

Scientific classification
- Kingdom: Animalia
- Phylum: Arthropoda
- Clade: Pancrustacea
- Class: Insecta
- Order: Coleoptera
- Suborder: Polyphaga
- Infraorder: Cucujiformia
- Family: Coccinellidae
- Genus: Prodilis
- Species: P. compta

Binomial name
- Prodilis compta (Gorham, 1899)

Synonyms
- Neaporia compta Gorham, 1899

Species of beetle

Prodilis compta is a species of beetle of the family Coccinellidae. It is found in Panama.

== Description ==
Adults reach a length of about 2.2 mm. Adults are bluish black with a yellow head. The pronotum is yellow. The elytron is bluish black, but reddish yellow at the apex.
