= Prodilis margarita =

Scientific classification
- Kingdom: Animalia
- Phylum: Arthropoda
- Clade: Pancrustacea
- Class: Insecta
- Order: Coleoptera
- Suborder: Polyphaga
- Infraorder: Cucujiformia
- Family: Coccinellidae
- Genus: Prodilis
- Species: P. margarita

Binomial name
- Prodilis margarita Gordon & Hanley, 2017

Species of beetle

Prodilis margarita is a species of beetle of the family Coccinellidae. It is found in Brazil.

== Description ==
Adults reach a length of about 2.6 mm. Adults are blue. The apical half of the head is yellowish red and the basal half is black. The pronotum is yellowish red.
