= Neaporia =

Scientific classification
- Kingdom: Animalia
- Phylum: Arthropoda
- Clade: Pancrustacea
- Class: Insecta
- Order: Coleoptera
- Suborder: Polyphaga
- Infraorder: Cucujiformia
- Family: Coccinellidae
- Tribe: Cephaloscymnini
- Genus: Neaporia; Gorham, 1897

Genus of insects

Neaporia is a genus of beetles belonging to the family Coccinellidae.

== Species ==
- Neaporia argentifrons Gorham, 1899
- Neaporia arrowi
- Neaporia becky
- Neaporia bobbie
- Neaporia brandy
- Neaporia carole
- Neaporia cassandra
- Neaporia christy
- Neaporia chucanti González & Větrovec, 2021
- Neaporia coelestis
- Neaporia daisy
- Neaporia deanna
- Neaporia dianne
- Neaporia felicia
- Neaporia gorhami
- Neaporia gwendolyn
- Neaporia hilda
- Neaporia irma
- Neaporia jennie
- Neaporia jenny
- Neaporia kay
- Neaporia kayla
- Neaporia kristina
- Neaporia laboulbenii
- Neaporia leah
- Neaporia lena
- Neaporia leona
- Neaporia longifrons
- Neaporia mabel
- Neaporia maculata
- Neaporia mae
- Neaporia margie
- Neaporia marsha
- Neaporia metallica Gorham, 1897
- Neaporia miriam
- Neaporia misty
- Neaporia myrtle
- Neaporia naomi
- Neaporia nina
- Neaporia nora
- Neaporia olga
- Neaporia opal
- Neaporia patsy
- Neaporia penny
- Neaporia priscilla
- Neaporia shelley
- Neaporia sonia
- Neaporia tracey
- Neaporia violet
- Neaporia viridiscens

== Selected former species ==
Examination of Neaporia amabilis Gorham, 1899 has revealed that it is not a species of Cephaloscymnini and may not even belong to the Coccinellidae family.
