= Prodilis sandy =

Scientific classification
- Kingdom: Animalia
- Phylum: Arthropoda
- Clade: Pancrustacea
- Class: Insecta
- Order: Coleoptera
- Suborder: Polyphaga
- Infraorder: Cucujiformia
- Family: Coccinellidae
- Genus: Prodilis
- Species: P. sandy

Binomial name
- Prodilis sandy Gordon & Hanley, 2017

Species of beetle

Prodilis sandy is a species of beetle of the family Coccinellidae. It is found in Brazil.

== Description ==
Adults reach a length of about 1.8–2.6 mm. Adults are black, with the head mostly yellow with some black areas. The pronotum is black with a partly yellow lateral margin. The elytron is blue.
