= Neaporia bobbie =

Scientific classification
- Kingdom: Animalia
- Phylum: Arthropoda
- Clade: Pancrustacea
- Class: Insecta
- Order: Coleoptera
- Suborder: Polyphaga
- Infraorder: Cucujiformia
- Family: Coccinellidae
- Genus: Neaporia
- Species: N. bobbie

Binomial name
- Neaporia bobbie Gordon & Hanley, 2017

Species of beetle

Neaporia bobbie is a species of beetle of the family Coccinellidae. It is found in Brazil.

== Description ==
Adults reach a length of about 1.6 mm. Adults are yellow. The pronotum is yellow with the median one-third black. The elytron has a small black spot.
