= Prodilis chiriquensis =

Scientific classification
- Kingdom: Animalia
- Phylum: Arthropoda
- Clade: Pancrustacea
- Class: Insecta
- Order: Coleoptera
- Suborder: Polyphaga
- Infraorder: Cucujiformia
- Family: Coccinellidae
- Genus: Prodilis
- Species: P. chiriquensis

Binomial name
- Prodilis chiriquensis (Gorham, 1899)

Synonyms
- Neaporia chiriquensis Gorham, 1899

Species of beetle

Prodilis chiriquensis is a species of beetle of the family Coccinellidae. It is found in Costa Rica and Panama.

== Description ==
Adults reach a length of about 2.1–2.6 mm. Adults are black, the head with three yellow vittae. The pronotum is bluish black with a reddish yellow lateral margin. The elytron is reddish yellow, while the apical half is bluish black.
