= Neaporia violet =

Scientific classification
- Kingdom: Animalia
- Phylum: Arthropoda
- Clade: Pancrustacea
- Class: Insecta
- Order: Coleoptera
- Suborder: Polyphaga
- Infraorder: Cucujiformia
- Family: Coccinellidae
- Genus: Neaporia
- Species: N. violet

Binomial name
- Neaporia violet Gordon & Hanley, 2017

Species of beetle

Neaporia violet is a species of beetle of the family Coccinellidae. It is found in Venezuela.

== Description ==
Adults reach a length of about 2 mm. Adults are black with a brassy tinge and a dark reddish brown head. The pronotum is dark brown with a reddish brown lateral margin.
