= Neaporia olga =

Scientific classification
- Kingdom: Animalia
- Phylum: Arthropoda
- Clade: Pancrustacea
- Class: Insecta
- Order: Coleoptera
- Suborder: Polyphaga
- Infraorder: Cucujiformia
- Family: Coccinellidae
- Genus: Neaporia
- Species: N. olga

Binomial name
- Neaporia olga Gordon & Hanley, 2017

Species of beetle

Neaporia olga is a species of beetle of the family Coccinellidae. It is found in Brazil.

== Description ==
Adults reach a length of about 1.5–1.6 mm. Adults are black. The pronotum and elytron both have a reddish brown lateral margin.
