= Neaporia kay =

Scientific classification
- Kingdom: Animalia
- Phylum: Arthropoda
- Clade: Pancrustacea
- Class: Insecta
- Order: Coleoptera
- Suborder: Polyphaga
- Infraorder: Cucujiformia
- Family: Coccinellidae
- Genus: Neaporia
- Species: N. kay

Binomial name
- Neaporia kay Gordon & Hanley, 2017

Species of beetle

Neaporia kay is a species of beetle of the family Coccinellidae. It is found in Venezuela.

== Description ==
Adults reach a length of about 1.8 mm. Adults are dark brown, with a yellowish brown pronotum. The elytron has a small yellow spot.
