= Cephaloscymnus mexicanus =

Scientific classification
- Kingdom: Animalia
- Phylum: Arthropoda
- Clade: Pancrustacea
- Class: Insecta
- Order: Coleoptera
- Suborder: Polyphaga
- Infraorder: Cucujiformia
- Family: Coccinellidae
- Genus: Cephaloscymnus
- Species: C. mexicanus

Binomial name
- Cephaloscymnus mexicanus Gordon, 1974

Species of beetle

Cephaloscymnus mexicanus is a species of beetle of the family Coccinellidae. It is found in Mexico, where it has been recorded from Coahuila and Durango.
