= Prodilis amelia =

Scientific classification
- Kingdom: Animalia
- Phylum: Arthropoda
- Clade: Pancrustacea
- Class: Insecta
- Order: Coleoptera
- Suborder: Polyphaga
- Infraorder: Cucujiformia
- Family: Coccinellidae
- Genus: Prodilis
- Species: P. amelia

Binomial name
- Prodilis amelia Gordon & Hanley, 2017

Species of beetle

Prodilis amelia is a species of beetle of the family Coccinellidae. It is found in Brazil.

== Description ==
Adults reach a length of about 2 mm. Adults are bluish black with a dark brown head. The pronotum is dark brown with the lateral margin and the base reddish yellow and the anterolateral angle yellow.
