= Prodilis lula =

Scientific classification
- Kingdom: Animalia
- Phylum: Arthropoda
- Clade: Pancrustacea
- Class: Insecta
- Order: Coleoptera
- Suborder: Polyphaga
- Infraorder: Cucujiformia
- Family: Coccinellidae
- Genus: Prodilis
- Species: P. lula

Binomial name
- Prodilis lula Gordon & Hanley, 2017

Species of beetle

Prodilis lula is a species of beetle of the family Coccinellidae. It is found in Venezuela.

== Description ==
Adults reach a length of about 2.4 mm. Adults are greenish black and the head is mostly yellow with some dark brown areas. The pronotum is yellow, with the median one-third yellowish brown. The elytron has yellow suture.
