= Neaporia patsy =

Scientific classification
- Kingdom: Animalia
- Phylum: Arthropoda
- Clade: Pancrustacea
- Class: Insecta
- Order: Coleoptera
- Suborder: Polyphaga
- Infraorder: Cucujiformia
- Family: Coccinellidae
- Genus: Neaporia
- Species: N. patsy

Binomial name
- Neaporia patsy Gordon & Hanley, 2017

Species of beetle

Neaporia patsy is a species of beetle of the family Coccinellidae. It is found in Panama.

== Description ==
Adults reach a length of about 2.2 mm. Adults are dark brown with a greenish black head. The pronotum is black with a yellow tint and a reddish yellow lateral margin. The elytron has a large reddish yellow spot.
