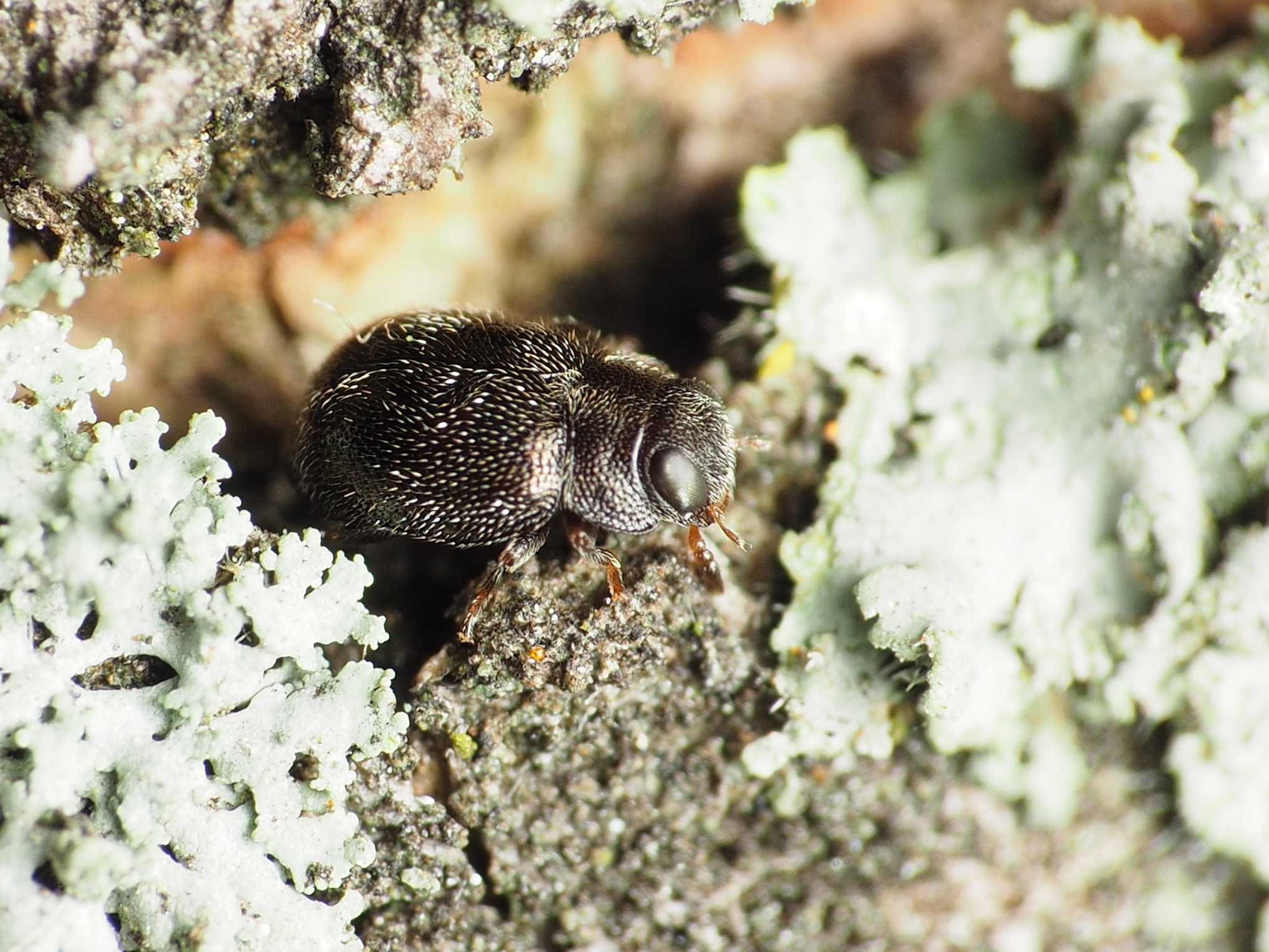

Scientific classification
- Kingdom: Animalia
- Phylum: Arthropoda
- Clade: Pancrustacea
- Class: Insecta
- Order: Coleoptera
- Suborder: Polyphaga
- Infraorder: Cucujiformia
- Family: Coccinellidae
- Genus: Cephaloscymnus
- Species: C. zimmermanni

Binomial name
- Cephaloscymnus zimmermanni Crotch, 1873

= Cephaloscymnus zimmermanni =

Species of beetle

Cephaloscymnus zimmermanni is a species of lady beetle in the family Coccinellidae. It is found in North America, where it has been recorded from Washington D.C., Ohio, Indiana, Maryland, New Jersey, South Carolina, Tennessee, Virginia and West Virginia.

== Description ==
Adults reach a length of about 2.15-2.40 mm. They have a piceous to black body.
