= Prodilis ada =

Scientific classification
- Kingdom: Animalia
- Phylum: Arthropoda
- Clade: Pancrustacea
- Class: Insecta
- Order: Coleoptera
- Suborder: Polyphaga
- Infraorder: Cucujiformia
- Family: Coccinellidae
- Genus: Prodilis
- Species: P. ada

Binomial name
- Prodilis ada Gordon & Hanley, 2017

Species of beetle

Prodilis ada is a species of beetle of the family Coccinellidae. It is found in Brazil.

== Description ==
Adults reach a length of about 2.4 mm. Adults are black and the head is mostly yellow with some black areas. The pronotum is reddish yellow with the median one-third dark brown. The elytron has a green tint and reddish lateral margin.
