= Prodilis bipunctata =

Scientific classification
- Kingdom: Animalia
- Phylum: Arthropoda
- Clade: Pancrustacea
- Class: Insecta
- Order: Coleoptera
- Suborder: Polyphaga
- Infraorder: Cucujiformia
- Family: Coccinellidae
- Genus: Prodilis
- Species: P. bipunctata

Binomial name
- Prodilis bipunctata (Weise, 1922)

Synonyms
- Prodiloides bipunctata Weise, 1922

Species of beetle

Prodilis bipunctata is a species of beetle of the family Coccinellidae. It is found in Argentina, Bolivia, Brazil and Paraguay.

== Description ==
Adults reach a length of about 2.0–2.4 mm. Adults are dark brown, with a mostly yellow head with some black areas. The pronotum is black with a reddish yellow lateral margin and anterolateral angle. The elytron has a yellow spot.
