= Prodilis kristi =

Scientific classification
- Kingdom: Animalia
- Phylum: Arthropoda
- Clade: Pancrustacea
- Class: Insecta
- Order: Coleoptera
- Suborder: Polyphaga
- Infraorder: Cucujiformia
- Family: Coccinellidae
- Genus: Prodilis
- Species: P. kristi

Binomial name
- Prodilis kristi Gordon & Hanley, 2017

Species of beetle

Prodilis kristi is a species of beetle of the family Coccinellidae. It is found in Brazil.

== Description ==
Adults reach a length of about 2 mm. Adults are variable in colour, but the head is mostly yellow with some black areas. The lateral one-third of the pronotum is yellow, while the remainder is black. The elytron is blue.
