= Neaporia chucanti =

Scientific classification
- Kingdom: Animalia
- Phylum: Arthropoda
- Clade: Pancrustacea
- Class: Insecta
- Order: Coleoptera
- Suborder: Polyphaga
- Infraorder: Cucujiformia
- Family: Coccinellidae
- Genus: Neaporia
- Species: N. chucanti

Binomial name
- Neaporia chucanti González & Větrovec, 2021

Species of beetle

Neaporia chucanti is a species of beetle of the family Coccinellidae. It is found in Panama.

== Description ==
Adults reach a length of about 2.2 mm (0.087 in). The head is yellow with a black spot, and the antennae are also yellow. The pronotum is black with a brown shine and with a yellow border. The scutellum is yellowish-brown and the elytra are metallic green and shiny, with a yellowish brown lateral border. They have golden yellow pubescence on the dorsal surface, while it is white on the ventral surface.

== Etymology ==
The species is named after the Chucantí Natural Reserve, where the holotype was collected.
