= Prodilis indagator =

Scientific classification
- Kingdom: Animalia
- Phylum: Arthropoda
- Clade: Pancrustacea
- Class: Insecta
- Order: Coleoptera
- Suborder: Polyphaga
- Infraorder: Cucujiformia
- Family: Coccinellidae
- Genus: Prodilis
- Species: P. indagator

Binomial name
- Prodilis indagator (Gorham, 1897)

Synonyms
- Neaporia indagator Gorham, 1897

Species of beetle

Prodilis indagator is a species of beetle of the family Coccinellidae. It is found in Guatemala and Panama.

== Description ==
Adults reach a length of about 2.6–2.8 mm. Adults are black with a yellow head with some black areas. The pronotum is black with a yellow anterolateral angle.
