= Neaporia penny =

Scientific classification
- Kingdom: Animalia
- Phylum: Arthropoda
- Clade: Pancrustacea
- Class: Insecta
- Order: Coleoptera
- Suborder: Polyphaga
- Infraorder: Cucujiformia
- Family: Coccinellidae
- Genus: Neaporia
- Species: N. penny

Binomial name
- Neaporia penny Gordon & Hanley, 2017

Species of beetle

Neaporia penny is a species of beetle of the family Coccinellidae. It is found in Panama and Bolivia.

== Description ==
Adults reach a length of about 1.4–1.7 mm. Adults are black with a blue head and elytron. The pronotum has a green metallic tint. The pronotum and elytra both have a reddish brown lateral margin. Finally, the elytron has a large reddish yellow spot.
