= Haemoplotina coccinea =

Scientific classification
- Kingdom: Animalia
- Phylum: Arthropoda
- Clade: Pancrustacea
- Class: Insecta
- Order: Coleoptera
- Suborder: Polyphaga
- Infraorder: Cucujiformia
- Family: Coccinellidae
- Genus: Haemoplotina
- Species: H. coccinea

Binomial name
- Haemoplotina coccinea (Crotch, 1874)

Synonyms
- Palaeoeneis coccinea Crotch, 1874; Palaeoneis coccinea javana Korschefsky, 1933

Species of beetle

Haemoplotina coccinea is a species of beetle of the family Coccinellidae. It is found in Malaysia (Sarawak) and Indonesia (Java).

== Description ==
Adults reach a length of about 3–4 mm (0.12–0.16 in). They are reddish brown, while the head is pitchy brown with yellowish testaceous antennae. The pronotum is pitchy black with the anterior corners yellowish brown. The scutellum is reddish brown to piceous and the elytra are orange-red or carmine-red, with a blackish band and a piceous black to black apical spot.
