= Cephaloscymnini =

Scientific classification
- Kingdom: Animalia
- Phylum: Arthropoda
- Clade: Pancrustacea
- Class: Insecta
- Order: Coleoptera
- Suborder: Polyphaga
- Infraorder: Cucujiformia
- Family: Coccinellidae
- Subfamily: Coccinellinae
- Tribe: Cephaloscymnini; Gordon, 1985

Tribe of beetles

The Cephaloscymnini are a tribe of insects within the family Coccinellidae.

== Genera ==
- Cephaloscymnus
- Neaporia
- Prodilis
- Succinctonotum

== Systematics ==
Cephaloscymnini has long been considered a tribe within the subfamily Sticholotidinae. However, later research resulted in a new classification of the Coccinellidae, with only two (and later three) subfamilies. Under that system, the Cephaloscymnini belong to the subfamily Coccinellinae.
