= Prodilis molly =

Scientific classification
- Kingdom: Animalia
- Phylum: Arthropoda
- Clade: Pancrustacea
- Class: Insecta
- Order: Coleoptera
- Suborder: Polyphaga
- Infraorder: Cucujiformia
- Family: Coccinellidae
- Genus: Prodilis
- Species: P. molly

Binomial name
- Prodilis molly Gordon & Hanley, 2017

Species of beetle

Prodilis molly is a species of beetle of the family Coccinellidae. It is found in Colombia.

== Description ==
Adults reach a length of about 2 mm. Adults are black, with the anterior half of the head yellow. The pronotum is black with a bluish tint and a reddish brown anterolateral angle. The elytron is blue.
