= Neaporia viridiscens =

Scientific classification
- Kingdom: Animalia
- Phylum: Arthropoda
- Clade: Pancrustacea
- Class: Insecta
- Order: Coleoptera
- Suborder: Polyphaga
- Infraorder: Cucujiformia
- Family: Coccinellidae
- Genus: Neaporia
- Species: N. viridiscens

Binomial name
- Neaporia viridiscens Gorham, 1899

Synonyms
- Neaporia cuprea Gorham, 1899

Species of beetle

Neaporia viridiscens is a species of beetle of the family Coccinellidae. It is found in Guatemala and Panama.

== Description ==
Adults reach a length of about 1.5–1.6 mm. Adults are black with a greenish tint.
