= Prodilis lola =

Scientific classification
- Kingdom: Animalia
- Phylum: Arthropoda
- Clade: Pancrustacea
- Class: Insecta
- Order: Coleoptera
- Suborder: Polyphaga
- Infraorder: Cucujiformia
- Family: Coccinellidae
- Genus: Prodilis
- Species: P. lola

Binomial name
- Prodilis lola Gordon & Hanley, 2017

Species of beetle

Prodilis lola is a species of beetle of the family Coccinellidae. It is found in Costa Rica.

== Description ==
Adults reach a length of about 2.5 mm. Adults are bluish black, while the head is black with the anterior half yellow. The pronotum is black.
