= Neaporia nora =

Scientific classification
- Kingdom: Animalia
- Phylum: Arthropoda
- Clade: Pancrustacea
- Class: Insecta
- Order: Coleoptera
- Suborder: Polyphaga
- Infraorder: Cucujiformia
- Family: Coccinellidae
- Genus: Neaporia
- Species: N. nora

Binomial name
- Neaporia nora Gordon & Hanley, 2017

Species of beetle

Neaporia nora is a species of beetle of the family Coccinellidae. It is found in Brazil.

== Description ==
Adults reach a length of about 2.2 mm. Adults are black with a greenish tint and with a dark brown head. Part of the lateral margin of the pronotum is reddish brown.
