= Neaporia longifrons =

Scientific classification
- Kingdom: Animalia
- Phylum: Arthropoda
- Clade: Pancrustacea
- Class: Insecta
- Order: Coleoptera
- Suborder: Polyphaga
- Infraorder: Cucujiformia
- Family: Coccinellidae
- Genus: Neaporia
- Species: N. longifrons

Binomial name
- Neaporia longifrons Gordon & Hanley, 2017

Species of beetle

Neaporia longifrons is a species of beetle of the family Coccinellidae. It is found in Venezuela.

== Description ==
Adults reach a length of about 1.3–1.4 mm. Adults are black with a yellow head. The lateral and anterior margins of the pronotum have a yellow border. The elytron has a yellow lateral border and two yellow spots.

== Etymology ==
The species is named for the long frons extended well beyond the antennal insertion.
