= Prodilis iris =

Scientific classification
- Kingdom: Animalia
- Phylum: Arthropoda
- Clade: Pancrustacea
- Class: Insecta
- Order: Coleoptera
- Suborder: Polyphaga
- Infraorder: Cucujiformia
- Family: Coccinellidae
- Genus: Prodilis
- Species: P. iris

Binomial name
- Prodilis iris Gordon & Hanley, 2017

Species of beetle

Prodilis iris is a species of beetle of the family Coccinellidae. It is found in Brazil.

== Description ==
Adults reach a length of about 1.6–1.7 mm. Adults are brownish yellow, while the head is yellow with pale yellow lateral margins and some black areas. The pronotum is yellow, while the median one-third is black.
