= Prodilis sherri =

Scientific classification
- Kingdom: Animalia
- Phylum: Arthropoda
- Clade: Pancrustacea
- Class: Insecta
- Order: Coleoptera
- Suborder: Polyphaga
- Infraorder: Cucujiformia
- Family: Coccinellidae
- Genus: Prodilis
- Species: P. sherri

Binomial name
- Prodilis sherri Gordon & Hanley, 2017

Species of beetle

Prodilis sherri is a species of beetle of the family Coccinellidae. It is found in Brazil.

== Description ==
Adults reach a length of about 2.0–2.7 mm. Adults are greenish black. The pronotum is black with the lateral one-eight yellow. The elytron has a reddish brown border.
