= Protoplotina ambigua =

Scientific classification
- Kingdom: Animalia
- Phylum: Arthropoda
- Clade: Pancrustacea
- Class: Insecta
- Order: Coleoptera
- Suborder: Polyphaga
- Infraorder: Cucujiformia
- Family: Coccinellidae
- Genus: Protoplotina
- Species: P. ambigua

Binomial name
- Protoplotina ambigua Poorani, Anuradha & Thanigairaj, 2021

Species of beetle

Protoplotina ambigua is a species of beetle of the family Coccinellidae. It is found in India (Tamil Nadu).

== Description ==
Adults reach a length of about 0.85–1.24 mm (0.033–0.049 in). The head and pronotum are yellowish to testaceous, while the elytra are dark brown to paler brown. The pattern o on the elytra is variable, but each elytron either has a dull reddish median macula or two yellowish bands across the middle. The ventral surface is either yellow, yellowish brown or dark brown, but the legs and antennae are lighter yellowish.

== Life history ==
They have been recorded preying on Pseudococcus jackbeardsleyi.
