= Prodilis sabrina =

Scientific classification
- Kingdom: Animalia
- Phylum: Arthropoda
- Clade: Pancrustacea
- Class: Insecta
- Order: Coleoptera
- Suborder: Polyphaga
- Infraorder: Cucujiformia
- Family: Coccinellidae
- Genus: Prodilis
- Species: P. sabrina

Binomial name
- Prodilis sabrina Gordon & Hanley, 2017

Species of beetle

Prodilis sabrina is a species of beetle of the family Coccinellidae. It is found in Panama.

== Description ==
Adults reach a length of about 1.8–2.0 mm. Adults are black, the head with brown, reddish yellow and pale yellow markings. The lateral one-fourth of the pronotum is reddish yellow and the elytron is bluish black.
