= Prodilis mamie =

Scientific classification
- Kingdom: Animalia
- Phylum: Arthropoda
- Clade: Pancrustacea
- Class: Insecta
- Order: Coleoptera
- Suborder: Polyphaga
- Infraorder: Cucujiformia
- Family: Coccinellidae
- Genus: Prodilis
- Species: P. mamie

Binomial name
- Prodilis mamie Gordon & Hanley, 2017

Species of beetle

Prodilis mamie is a species of beetle of the family Coccinellidae. It is found in Brazil.

== Description ==
Adults reach a length of about 2.4 mm. Adults are dark brown, while the head is black with the anterior one-third yellow. The median one-third of the pronotum is dark brown, while the lateral one-third is paler reddish brown. The elytron has a small yellow spot.
