= Prodilis inclyta =

Scientific classification
- Kingdom: Animalia
- Phylum: Arthropoda
- Clade: Pancrustacea
- Class: Insecta
- Order: Coleoptera
- Suborder: Polyphaga
- Infraorder: Cucujiformia
- Family: Coccinellidae
- Genus: Prodilis
- Species: P. inclyta

Binomial name
- Prodilis inclyta (Mulsant, 1853)

Synonyms
- Scymnus (Pullus) inclytus Mulsant, 1853

Species of beetle

Prodilis inclyta is a species of beetle of the family Coccinellidae. It is found in Brazil.
