= Prodilis rugosa =

Scientific classification
- Kingdom: Animalia
- Phylum: Arthropoda
- Clade: Pancrustacea
- Class: Insecta
- Order: Coleoptera
- Suborder: Polyphaga
- Infraorder: Cucujiformia
- Family: Coccinellidae
- Genus: Prodilis
- Species: P. rugosa

Binomial name
- Prodilis rugosa (Gorham, 1899)

Synonyms
- Neaporia rugosa Gorham, 1899

Species of beetle

Prodilis rugosa is a species of beetle of the family Coccinellidae. It is found in Panama.

== Description ==
Adults reach a length of about 1.7 mm. Adults are bluish black with a blue head. The pronotum is bluish black with a reddish yellow lateral margin. The elytron has an oval yellow spot and a reddish yellow lateral margin.
