= Plotina muelleri =

Scientific classification
- Kingdom: Animalia
- Phylum: Arthropoda
- Clade: Pancrustacea
- Class: Insecta
- Order: Coleoptera
- Suborder: Polyphaga
- Infraorder: Cucujiformia
- Family: Coccinellidae
- Genus: Plotina
- Species: P. muelleri

Binomial name
- Plotina muelleri Mader, 1955

Species of beetle

Plotina muelleri is a species of beetle of the family Coccinellidae. It is found in China (Fujian), India (Meghalaya) and Vietnam.

== Description ==
Adults reach a length of about 3.08–3.78 mm (0.121–0.149 in). The head is yellowish brown and the pronotum is also yellowish brown, but with two black basal spots and with the lateral portions and anterior corners whitish-yellow. The scutellum is dark brown and the elytra are reddish brown with two white-yellowish spots.
