= Cephaloscymnus beulah =

Scientific classification
- Kingdom: Animalia
- Phylum: Arthropoda
- Clade: Pancrustacea
- Class: Insecta
- Order: Coleoptera
- Suborder: Polyphaga
- Infraorder: Cucujiformia
- Family: Coccinellidae
- Genus: Cephaloscymnus
- Species: C. beulah

Binomial name
- Cephaloscymnus beulah Gordon & Hanley, 2017

Species of beetle

Cephaloscymnus beulah is a species of beetle of the family Coccinellidae. It is found in Mexico.

== Description ==
Adults reach a length of about 2.2 mm. Adults are brown, although the head is dark brown with a yellowish–brown marking. The pronotum is yellowish brown.
