= Neaporia maculata =

Scientific classification
- Kingdom: Animalia
- Phylum: Arthropoda
- Clade: Pancrustacea
- Class: Insecta
- Order: Coleoptera
- Suborder: Polyphaga
- Infraorder: Cucujiformia
- Family: Coccinellidae
- Genus: Neaporia
- Species: N. maculata

Binomial name
- Neaporia maculata (Weise, 1902)

Synonyms
- Prodilis maculata Weise, 1902

Species of beetle

Neaporia maculata is a species of beetle of the family Coccinellidae. It is found in Peru.

== Description ==
Adults reach a length of about 2.5 mm. Adults are black with a bluish black head. The pronotum is bluish black with a yellow lateral margin. The elytron is black with a large yellow spot.
