= Neaporia marsha =

Scientific classification
- Kingdom: Animalia
- Phylum: Arthropoda
- Clade: Pancrustacea
- Class: Insecta
- Order: Coleoptera
- Suborder: Polyphaga
- Infraorder: Cucujiformia
- Family: Coccinellidae
- Genus: Neaporia
- Species: N. marsha

Binomial name
- Neaporia marsha Gordon & Hanley, 2017

Species of beetle

Neaporia marsha is a species of beetle of the family Coccinellidae. It is found in Bolivia.

== Description ==
Adults reach a length of about 3 mm. The elytron is pale red with a black spot.
