= Prodilis natasha =

Scientific classification
- Kingdom: Animalia
- Phylum: Arthropoda
- Clade: Pancrustacea
- Class: Insecta
- Order: Coleoptera
- Suborder: Polyphaga
- Infraorder: Cucujiformia
- Family: Coccinellidae
- Genus: Prodilis
- Species: P. natasha

Binomial name
- Prodilis natasha Gordon & Hanley, 2017

Species of beetle

Prodilis natasha is a species of beetle of the family Coccinellidae. It is found in Panama.

== Description ==
Adults reach a length of about 2 mm. Adults are black and the head is mostly yellow with some black areas. The pronotum is black with a reddish yellow anterolateral angle. The elytron is reddish yellow, although the basal one-eight is black.
