= Prodilis ramona =

Scientific classification
- Kingdom: Animalia
- Phylum: Arthropoda
- Clade: Pancrustacea
- Class: Insecta
- Order: Coleoptera
- Suborder: Polyphaga
- Infraorder: Cucujiformia
- Family: Coccinellidae
- Genus: Prodilis
- Species: P. ramona

Binomial name
- Prodilis ramona Gordon & Hanley, 2017

Species of beetle

Prodilis ramona is a species of beetle of the family Coccinellidae. It is found in Colombia and Venezuela.

== Description ==
Adults reach a length of about 2.0–2.6 mm. Adults are reddish yellow. The pronotum is black with a yellow lateral margin and anterolateral angle. Part of the elytron is black with a bluish tint.
