= Cephaloscymnus insulatus =

Scientific classification
- Kingdom: Animalia
- Phylum: Arthropoda
- Clade: Pancrustacea
- Class: Insecta
- Order: Coleoptera
- Suborder: Polyphaga
- Infraorder: Cucujiformia
- Family: Coccinellidae
- Genus: Cephaloscymnus
- Species: C. insulatus

Binomial name
- Cephaloscymnus insulatus Gordon, 1970

Species of beetle

Cephaloscymnus insulatus is a species of lady beetle in the family Coccinellidae. It is found in North America, where it has been recorded from Arizona.

== Description ==
Adults reach a length of about 1.10 to 1.30 mm. They have a brown body, while the pronotum is reddish.
