= Neaporia arrowi =

Scientific classification
- Kingdom: Animalia
- Phylum: Arthropoda
- Clade: Pancrustacea
- Class: Insecta
- Order: Coleoptera
- Suborder: Polyphaga
- Infraorder: Cucujiformia
- Family: Coccinellidae
- Genus: Neaporia
- Species: N. arrowi

Binomial name
- Neaporia arrowi Brèthes, 1925

Species of beetle

Neaporia arrowi is a species of beetle of the family Coccinellidae. It is found in Brazil.

== Description ==
Adults reach a length of about 3.1 mm. Adults are black, the head with two yellow markings. The elytron is densely punctured.
