= Prodilis pubescens =

Scientific classification
- Kingdom: Animalia
- Phylum: Arthropoda
- Clade: Pancrustacea
- Class: Insecta
- Order: Coleoptera
- Suborder: Polyphaga
- Infraorder: Cucujiformia
- Family: Coccinellidae
- Genus: Prodilis
- Species: P. pubescens

Binomial name
- Prodilis pubescens (Gorham, 1897)

Synonyms
- Neaporia pubescens Gorham, 1897

Species of beetle

Prodilis pubescens is a species of beetle of the family Coccinellidae. It is found in Panama.

== Description ==
Adults reach a length of about 2.4 mm. Adults are brown, while the head is reddish brown. The pronotum is reddish brown and the elytron has three pale reddish yellow spots.
