= Prodilis araguaensis =

Scientific classification
- Kingdom: Animalia
- Phylum: Arthropoda
- Clade: Pancrustacea
- Class: Insecta
- Order: Coleoptera
- Suborder: Polyphaga
- Infraorder: Cucujiformia
- Family: Coccinellidae
- Genus: Prodilis
- Species: P. araguaensis

Binomial name
- Prodilis araguaensis Gordon & Hanley, 2017

Species of beetle

Prodilis araguaensis is a species of beetle of the family Coccinellidae. It is found in Venezuela.

== Description ==
Adults reach a length of about 2.3–2.4 mm. Adults are black, the head with a yellow spot.
