= Neaporia leah =

Scientific classification
- Kingdom: Animalia
- Phylum: Arthropoda
- Clade: Pancrustacea
- Class: Insecta
- Order: Coleoptera
- Suborder: Polyphaga
- Infraorder: Cucujiformia
- Family: Coccinellidae
- Genus: Neaporia
- Species: N. leah

Binomial name
- Neaporia leah Gordon & Hanley, 2017

Species of beetle

Neaporia leah is a species of beetle of the family Coccinellidae. It is found in Honduras.

== Description ==
Adults reach a length of about 1.5 mm. Adults have a reddish yellow head and pronotum and the lateral and apical margins of the elytron are also reddish yellow.
