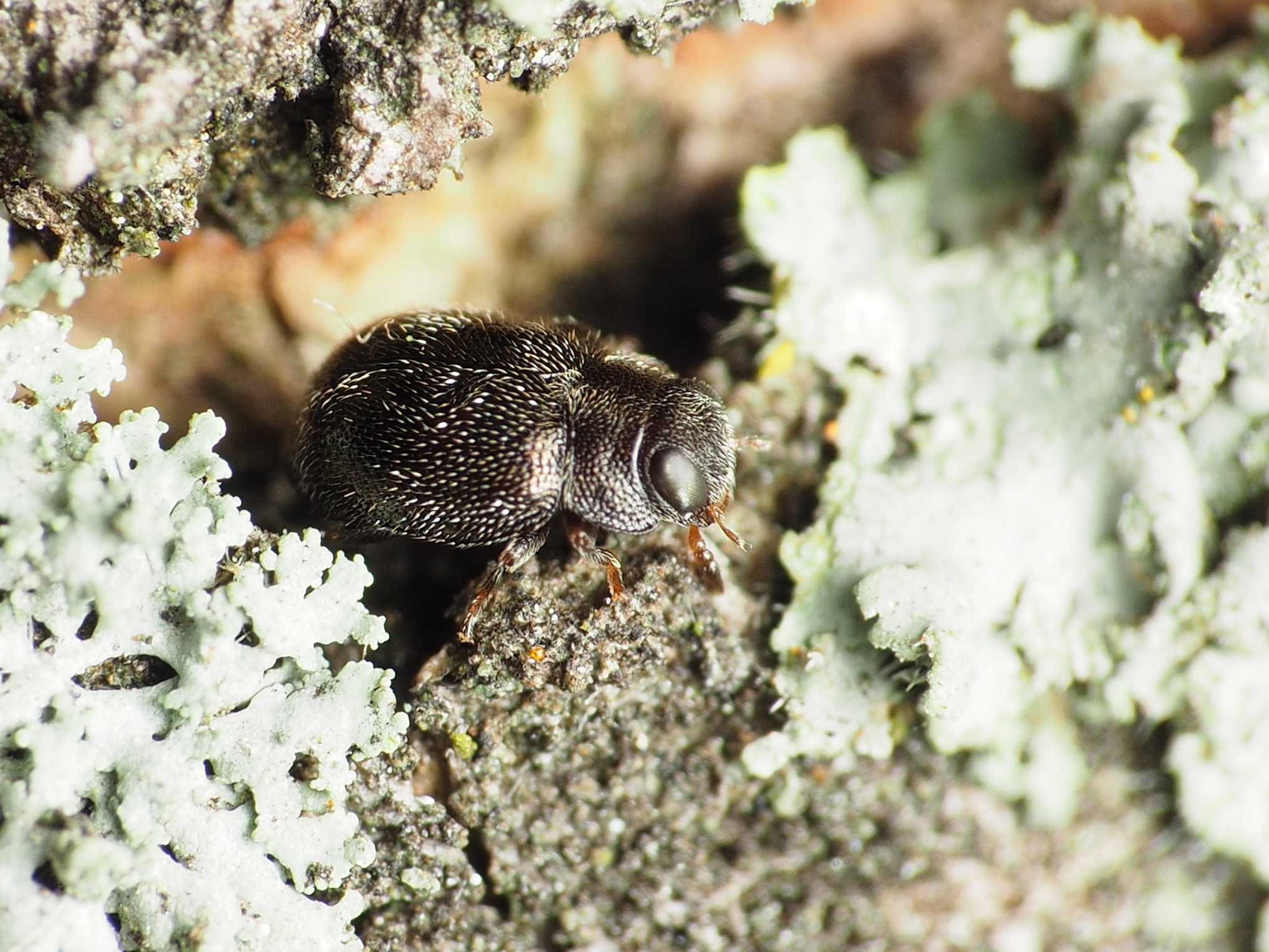
- Cephaloscymnus zimmermanni

Scientific classification
- Kingdom: Animalia
- Phylum: Arthropoda
- Clade: Pancrustacea
- Class: Insecta
- Order: Coleoptera
- Suborder: Polyphaga
- Infraorder: Cucujiformia
- Family: Coccinellidae
- Tribe: Cephaloscymnini
- Genus: Cephaloscymnus; Crotch, 1873

= Cephaloscymnus =

Genus of beetles

Cephaloscymnus is a genus of lady beetles in the family Coccinellidae.

== Species ==
These species belong to the genus Cephaloscymnus:

- Cephaloscymnus australis Gordon, 1970
- Cephaloscymnus beulah Gordon & Hanley, 2017
- Cephaloscymnus candice Gordon & Hanley, 2017
- Cephaloscymnus gnomus Gordon, 1974
- Cephaloscymnus insulatus Gordon, 1970
- Cephaloscymnus juanita Gordon & Hanley, 2017
- Cephaloscymnus laevis Gordon, 1970
- Cephaloscymnus mexicanus Gordon, 1974
- Cephaloscymnus occidentalis Horn, 1895
- Cephaloscymnus porteri Brèthes, 1925
- Cephaloscymnus zimmermanni Crotch, 1873
