= Neaporia leona =

Scientific classification
- Kingdom: Animalia
- Phylum: Arthropoda
- Clade: Pancrustacea
- Class: Insecta
- Order: Coleoptera
- Suborder: Polyphaga
- Infraorder: Cucujiformia
- Family: Coccinellidae
- Genus: Neaporia
- Species: N. leona

Binomial name
- Neaporia leona Gordon & Hanley, 2017

Species of beetle

Neaporia leona is a species of beetle of the family Coccinellidae. It is found in Venezuela.

== Description ==
Adults reach a length of about 1.6 mm. Adults are black, the head with a yellow spot. The lateral margin of the pronotum is reddish brown, while the elytron has a yellowish brown margin.
