= Prodilis faye =

Scientific classification
- Kingdom: Animalia
- Phylum: Arthropoda
- Clade: Pancrustacea
- Class: Insecta
- Order: Coleoptera
- Suborder: Polyphaga
- Infraorder: Cucujiformia
- Family: Coccinellidae
- Genus: Prodilis
- Species: P. faye

Binomial name
- Prodilis faye Gordon & Hanley, 2017

Species of beetle

Prodilis faye is a species of beetle of the family Coccinellidae. It is found in Brazil.

== Description ==
Adults reach a length of about 2 mm. Adults are light reddish brown and the head is mostly yellow with some black areas. The pronotum is reddish yellow with the apical margin partly dark brown.
