= Prodilis cribrata =

Scientific classification
- Kingdom: Animalia
- Phylum: Arthropoda
- Clade: Pancrustacea
- Class: Insecta
- Order: Coleoptera
- Suborder: Polyphaga
- Infraorder: Cucujiformia
- Family: Coccinellidae
- Genus: Prodilis
- Species: P. cribrata

Binomial name
- Prodilis cribrata (Gorham, 1897)

Synonyms
- Neaporia cribrata Gorham, 1897

Species of beetle

Prodilis cribrata is a species of beetle of the family Coccinellidae. It is found in Mexico (Tabasco).

== Description ==
Adults reach a length of about 1.8 mm. Adults are blue, while the head and pronotum are black.
