= Prodilis joanna =

Scientific classification
- Kingdom: Animalia
- Phylum: Arthropoda
- Clade: Pancrustacea
- Class: Insecta
- Order: Coleoptera
- Suborder: Polyphaga
- Infraorder: Cucujiformia
- Family: Coccinellidae
- Genus: Prodilis
- Species: P. joanna

Binomial name
- Prodilis joanna Gordon & Hanley, 2017

Species of beetle

Prodilis joanna is a species of beetle of the family Coccinellidae. It is found in Costa Rica.

== Description ==
Adults reach a length of about 1.4 mm. Adults are yellowish brown and the head is mostly black with a yellowish brown area. The pronotum is dark brown, with the lateral one-third yellowish brown.
