= Neaporia miriam =

Scientific classification
- Kingdom: Animalia
- Phylum: Arthropoda
- Clade: Pancrustacea
- Class: Insecta
- Order: Coleoptera
- Suborder: Polyphaga
- Infraorder: Cucujiformia
- Family: Coccinellidae
- Genus: Neaporia
- Species: N. miriam

Binomial name
- Neaporia miriam Gordon & Hanley, 2017

Species of beetle

Neaporia miriam is a species of beetle of the family Coccinellidae. It is found in Venezuela.

== Description ==
Adults reach a length of about 1.3–1.4 mm. Adults are black. The lateral margin of the pronotum is also black, but the antennae and mouthparts are yellow.
