= Prodilis kristy =

Scientific classification
- Kingdom: Animalia
- Phylum: Arthropoda
- Clade: Pancrustacea
- Class: Insecta
- Order: Coleoptera
- Suborder: Polyphaga
- Infraorder: Cucujiformia
- Family: Coccinellidae
- Genus: Prodilis
- Species: P. kristy

Binomial name
- Prodilis kristy Gordon & Hanley, 2017

Species of beetle

Prodilis kristy is a species of beetle of the family Coccinellidae. It is found in Brazil.

== Description ==
Adults reach a length of about 2.4 mm. Adults are blue, the head with the anterior half yellow.
