= Ballida brahamae =

Scientific classification
- Kingdom: Animalia
- Phylum: Arthropoda
- Clade: Pancrustacea
- Class: Insecta
- Order: Coleoptera
- Suborder: Polyphaga
- Infraorder: Cucujiformia
- Family: Coccinellidae
- Genus: Ballida
- Species: B. brahamae

Binomial name
- Ballida brahamae Mulsant, 1850

Synonyms
- Palaeoeneis aurantiaca Crotch, 1874; Eoneda sumatrensis Iablokoff-Khnzorian, 1985

Species of beetle

Ballida brahamae is a species of beetle of the family Coccinellidae. It is found in Vietnam, Laos, Malaysia (Malacca) and Indonesia (Sumatra).

== Description ==
Adults reach a length of about 4.25–4.45 mm (0.167–0.175 in). The head is dark reddish brown, while the antennae are reddish testaceous. The pronotum is piceous, with the anterior margin reddish and the scutellum is piceous black. The elytra are orange-yellow, with a blackish band and a blackish apical spot and sutural margin.
