= Prodilis flora =

Scientific classification
- Kingdom: Animalia
- Phylum: Arthropoda
- Clade: Pancrustacea
- Class: Insecta
- Order: Coleoptera
- Suborder: Polyphaga
- Infraorder: Cucujiformia
- Family: Coccinellidae
- Genus: Prodilis
- Species: P. flora

Binomial name
- Prodilis flora Gordon & Hanley, 2017

Species of beetle

Prodilis flora is a species of beetle of the family Coccinellidae. It is found in Venezuela.

== Description ==
Adults reach a length of about 2.7–3.4 mm. Adults are black and the head is yellow with some black areas. The pronotum is black without markings.
