= Neaporia mabel =

Scientific classification
- Kingdom: Animalia
- Phylum: Arthropoda
- Clade: Pancrustacea
- Class: Insecta
- Order: Coleoptera
- Suborder: Polyphaga
- Infraorder: Cucujiformia
- Family: Coccinellidae
- Genus: Neaporia
- Species: N. mabel

Binomial name
- Neaporia mabel Gordon & Hanley, 2017

Species of beetle

Neaporia mabel is a species of beetle of the family Coccinellidae. It is found in Ecuador.

== Description ==
Adults reach a length of about 2.4 mm. Adults are red, although the head is black with three yellow markings. The pronotum is black with a reddish brown lateral margin. The elytron has a small dark brown spot.
