= Prodilis lindsey =

Scientific classification
- Kingdom: Animalia
- Phylum: Arthropoda
- Clade: Pancrustacea
- Class: Insecta
- Order: Coleoptera
- Suborder: Polyphaga
- Infraorder: Cucujiformia
- Family: Coccinellidae
- Genus: Prodilis
- Species: P. lindsey

Binomial name
- Prodilis lindsey Gordon & Hanley, 2017

Species of beetle

Prodilis lindsey is a species of beetle of the family Coccinellidae. It is found in Venezuela.

== Description ==
Adults reach a length of about 2.5–2.6 mm. Adults are yellowish red and the head is black with the apical half yellow. The pronotum is black a greenish tint. The basal margin and anterior two-third of the lateral margin of the elytron are black.
