= Prodilis erika =

Scientific classification
- Kingdom: Animalia
- Phylum: Arthropoda
- Clade: Pancrustacea
- Class: Insecta
- Order: Coleoptera
- Suborder: Polyphaga
- Infraorder: Cucujiformia
- Family: Coccinellidae
- Genus: Prodilis
- Species: P. erika

Binomial name
- Prodilis erika Gordon & Hanley, 2017

Species of beetle

Prodilis erika is a species of beetle of the family Coccinellidae. It is found in Brazil.

== Description ==
Adults reach a length of about 3 mm. Adults are brown, with the apical half of the head yellow. The pronotum is yellow, although the median one-third is light brown.
