= Cephaloscymnus candice =

Scientific classification
- Kingdom: Animalia
- Phylum: Arthropoda
- Clade: Pancrustacea
- Class: Insecta
- Order: Coleoptera
- Suborder: Polyphaga
- Infraorder: Cucujiformia
- Family: Coccinellidae
- Genus: Cephaloscymnus
- Species: C. candice

Binomial name
- Cephaloscymnus candice Gordon & Hanley, 2017

Species of beetle

Cephaloscymnus candice is a species of beetle of the family Coccinellidae. It is found in Mexico, where it has been recorded from Durango.

== Description ==
Adults reach a length of about 2.4 mm. Adults are dark brown, although the anterior half of the head is reddish brown. The pronotum is red and the antennae and legs are yellow.
