= Neaporia becky =

Scientific classification
- Kingdom: Animalia
- Phylum: Arthropoda
- Clade: Pancrustacea
- Class: Insecta
- Order: Coleoptera
- Suborder: Polyphaga
- Infraorder: Cucujiformia
- Family: Coccinellidae
- Genus: Neaporia
- Species: N. becky

Binomial name
- Neaporia becky Gordon & Hanley, 2017

Species of beetle

Neaporia becky is a species of beetle of the family Coccinellidae. It is found in Trinidad.

== Description ==
Adults reach a length of about 1.6–1.7 mm. Adults are black with yellow antennae and mouthparts. The lateral margin of the pronotum is also black. The elytron is brown.
