= Prodilis hattie =

Scientific classification
- Kingdom: Animalia
- Phylum: Arthropoda
- Clade: Pancrustacea
- Class: Insecta
- Order: Coleoptera
- Suborder: Polyphaga
- Infraorder: Cucujiformia
- Family: Coccinellidae
- Genus: Prodilis
- Species: P. hattie

Binomial name
- Prodilis hattie Gordon & Hanley, 2017

Species of beetle

Prodilis hattie is a species of beetle of the family Coccinellidae. It is found in Brazil.

== Description ==
Adults reach a length of about 2.3 mm. Adults are black, the head is mostly yellow with some black areas. The lateral one-fourth of the pronotum is reddish yellow and the elytron has an oval reddish yellow spot.
