= Neaporia deanna =

Scientific classification
- Kingdom: Animalia
- Phylum: Arthropoda
- Clade: Pancrustacea
- Class: Insecta
- Order: Coleoptera
- Suborder: Polyphaga
- Infraorder: Cucujiformia
- Family: Coccinellidae
- Genus: Neaporia
- Species: N. deanna

Binomial name
- Neaporia deanna Gordon & Hanley, 2017

Species of beetle

Neaporia deanna is a species of beetle of the family Coccinellidae. It is found in Panama.

== Description ==
Adults reach a length of about 2.6–3.0 mm. Adults are purplish black, although the head has three yellow vittae. The lateral margin of the pronotum is reddish yellow.
