= Prodilis fannie =

Scientific classification
- Kingdom: Animalia
- Phylum: Arthropoda
- Clade: Pancrustacea
- Class: Insecta
- Order: Coleoptera
- Suborder: Polyphaga
- Infraorder: Cucujiformia
- Family: Coccinellidae
- Genus: Prodilis
- Species: P. fannie

Binomial name
- Prodilis fannie Gordon & Hanley, 2017

Species of beetle

Prodilis fannie is a species of beetle of the family Coccinellidae. It is found in Bolivia.

== Description ==
Adults reach a length of about 2.4–2.6 mm. Adults are black, the head with a yellow marking. The pronotum is black with a reddish yellow fore angle. The elytron is reddish yellow with a black sutural margin.
