= Prodilis maggie =

Scientific classification
- Kingdom: Animalia
- Phylum: Arthropoda
- Clade: Pancrustacea
- Class: Insecta
- Order: Coleoptera
- Suborder: Polyphaga
- Infraorder: Cucujiformia
- Family: Coccinellidae
- Genus: Prodilis
- Species: P. maggie

Binomial name
- Prodilis maggie Gordon & Hanley, 2017

Species of beetle

Prodilis maggie is a species of beetle of the family Coccinellidae. It is found in Colombia.

== Description ==
Adults reach a length of about 2.3 mm. Adults are black, the head with two black spots. The pronotum is black with reddish brown anterolateral angles. The elytron has two large reddish yellow spots.
