= Prodilis guatemalana =

Scientific classification
- Kingdom: Animalia
- Phylum: Arthropoda
- Clade: Pancrustacea
- Class: Insecta
- Order: Coleoptera
- Suborder: Polyphaga
- Infraorder: Cucujiformia
- Family: Coccinellidae
- Genus: Prodilis
- Species: P. guatemalana

Binomial name
- Prodilis guatemalana (Gorham, 1897)

Synonyms
- Neaporia guatemalana Gorham, 1897

Species of beetle

Prodilis guatemalana is a species of beetle of the family Coccinellidae. It is found in Guatemala.

== Description ==
Adults reach a length of about 1.9–2.0 mm. Adults are black, the head with a reddish yellow area. The pronotum and elytron are black with a reddish yellow lateral border.
