= Buprestodera inornata =

Scientific classification
- Kingdom: Animalia
- Phylum: Arthropoda
- Clade: Pancrustacea
- Class: Insecta
- Order: Coleoptera
- Suborder: Polyphaga
- Infraorder: Cucujiformia
- Family: Coccinellidae
- Genus: Buprestodera
- Species: B. inornata

Binomial name
- Buprestodera inornata Miyatake, 1969

Species of beetle

Buprestodera inornata is a species of beetle of the family Coccinellidae. It is found in India (Kerala, Tamil Nadu).

== Description ==
Adults reach a length of about 4–4.5 mm (0.16–0.18 in). The dorsal surface is bright red to yellowish-orange and shiny, with the head darker reddish brown and the antennal club piceous. The ventral surface is reddish or brownish testaceous, with mostly piceous to blackish legs.
