= Prodilis susie =

Scientific classification
- Kingdom: Animalia
- Phylum: Arthropoda
- Clade: Pancrustacea
- Class: Insecta
- Order: Coleoptera
- Suborder: Polyphaga
- Infraorder: Cucujiformia
- Family: Coccinellidae
- Genus: Prodilis
- Species: P. susie

Binomial name
- Prodilis susie Gordon & Hanley, 2017

Species of beetle

Prodilis susie is a species of beetle of the family Coccinellidae. It is found in Brazil.

== Description ==
Adults reach a length of about 1.5 mm. Adults are black, the head with two yellow markings. The anterolateral angle of the pronotum is brown and the lateral margin of the elytron is reddish brown.
