= Prodilis sonya =

Scientific classification
- Kingdom: Animalia
- Phylum: Arthropoda
- Clade: Pancrustacea
- Class: Insecta
- Order: Coleoptera
- Suborder: Polyphaga
- Infraorder: Cucujiformia
- Family: Coccinellidae
- Genus: Prodilis
- Species: P. sonya

Binomial name
- Prodilis sonya Gordon & Hanley, 2017

Species of beetle

Prodilis sonya is a species of beetle of the family Coccinellidae. It is found in Venezuela.

== Description ==
Adults reach a length of about 2.2 mm. Adults are reddish yellow, while the head is dark yellow with some dark brown areas. The median one-third of the pronotum is brown.
