= Ballida =

Scientific classification
- Kingdom: Animalia
- Phylum: Arthropoda
- Clade: Pancrustacea
- Class: Insecta
- Order: Coleoptera
- Suborder: Polyphaga
- Infraorder: Cucujiformia
- Family: Coccinellidae
- Subfamily: Coccinellinae
- Tribe: Plotinini
- Genus: Ballida; Mulsant, 1850

Synonyms
- Palaeoeneis Crotch, 1874; Eoneda Iablokoff-Khnzorian, 1985

Genus of beetles

Ballida is a genus of beetles belonging to the family Coccinellidae.

== Species ==
- Ballida brahamae
- Ballida ishiharai
- Ballida quichauensis
