= Prodilis geneva =

Scientific classification
- Kingdom: Animalia
- Phylum: Arthropoda
- Clade: Pancrustacea
- Class: Insecta
- Order: Coleoptera
- Suborder: Polyphaga
- Infraorder: Cucujiformia
- Family: Coccinellidae
- Genus: Prodilis
- Species: P. geneva

Binomial name
- Prodilis geneva Gordon & Hanley, 2017

Species of beetle

Prodilis geneva is a species of beetle of the family Coccinellidae. It is found in Brazil.

== Description ==
Adults reach a length of about 1.8–2.3 mm. Adults are greenish black, with the basal one-third of the head reddish yellow and the remainder yellow. The pronotum is reddish yellow and the lateral margin of the elytron is reddish brown.
