= Buprestodera reclusa =

Scientific classification
- Kingdom: Animalia
- Phylum: Arthropoda
- Clade: Pancrustacea
- Class: Insecta
- Order: Coleoptera
- Suborder: Polyphaga
- Infraorder: Cucujiformia
- Family: Coccinellidae
- Genus: Buprestodera
- Species: B. reclusa

Binomial name
- Buprestodera reclusa Poorani, 2025

Species of beetle

Buprestodera reclusa is a species of beetle of the family Coccinellidae. It is found in India (Karnataka, Kerala).

== Description ==
Adults reach a length of about 3.29–3.53 mm (0.130–0.139 in). The head and pronotum are reddish brown to castaneous, while the elytra are reddish brown with two yellow maculae and four smaller black spots.

== Etymology ==
The species name is Latin and refers to its remote and isolated habitat.
