= Prodilis janie =

Scientific classification
- Kingdom: Animalia
- Phylum: Arthropoda
- Clade: Pancrustacea
- Class: Insecta
- Order: Coleoptera
- Suborder: Polyphaga
- Infraorder: Cucujiformia
- Family: Coccinellidae
- Genus: Prodilis
- Species: P. janie

Binomial name
- Prodilis janie Gordon & Hanley, 2017

Species of beetle

Prodilis janie is a species of beetle of the family Coccinellidae. It is found in Panama.

== Description ==
Adults reach a length of about 1.4–1.7 mm. Adults are black, the head with the apical half yellow with some black areas. The pronotum is black and the elytron is reddish yellow with a black area.
