= Succinctonotum =

Scientific classification
- Kingdom: Animalia
- Phylum: Arthropoda
- Clade: Pancrustacea
- Class: Insecta
- Order: Coleoptera
- Suborder: Polyphaga
- Infraorder: Cucujiformia
- Family: Coccinellidae
- Tribe: Cephaloscymnini
- Genus: Succinctonotum; Gordon & Hanley, 2017

Genus of insects

Succinctonotum is a genus of beetles belonging to the family Coccinellidae. The one species, Succinctonotum frosti, is found in Panama.

== Description ==
Adults reach a length of about 1.4 mm. Adults are black with a reddish yellow head. The anterolateral angle of the pronotum is reddish yellow and the elytron has a brownish red margin.

== Etymology ==
The species is named in honour of S. W. Frost, the collector of the holotype.
