= Prodilis volgus =

Scientific classification
- Kingdom: Animalia
- Phylum: Arthropoda
- Clade: Pancrustacea
- Class: Insecta
- Order: Coleoptera
- Suborder: Polyphaga
- Infraorder: Cucujiformia
- Family: Coccinellidae
- Genus: Prodilis
- Species: P. volgus

Binomial name
- Prodilis volgus (Mulsant, 1853)

Synonyms
- Scymnus (Polius) volgus Mulsant, 1853; Cephaloscymnus bruchi Weise, 1904; Clythra brevicollis Boheman, 1859

Species of beetle

Prodilis volgus is a species of beetle of the family Coccinellidae. It is found in Brazil and Venezuela.

== Description ==
Adults reach a length of about 1.8–2.1 mm. Adults are greenish black, with the head reddish yellow with two small brown spots. The pronotum is reddish yellow, with the central half brown. The lateral margin of the elytron is reddish brown.
