= Prodilis jodi =

Scientific classification
- Kingdom: Animalia
- Phylum: Arthropoda
- Clade: Pancrustacea
- Class: Insecta
- Order: Coleoptera
- Suborder: Polyphaga
- Infraorder: Cucujiformia
- Family: Coccinellidae
- Genus: Prodilis
- Species: P. jodi

Binomial name
- Prodilis jodi Gordon & Hanley, 2017

Species of beetle

Prodilis jodi is a species of beetle of the family Coccinellidae. It is found in Ecuador and Peru.

== Description ==
Adults reach a length of about 2 mm. Adults are black, the head with the apical three-fourth yellow. The lateral one-third of the pronotum is reddish brown. The elytron has an oval yellow spot.
