= Cephaloscymnus gnomus =

Scientific classification
- Kingdom: Animalia
- Phylum: Arthropoda
- Clade: Pancrustacea
- Class: Insecta
- Order: Coleoptera
- Suborder: Polyphaga
- Infraorder: Cucujiformia
- Family: Coccinellidae
- Genus: Cephaloscymnus
- Species: C. gnomus

Binomial name
- Cephaloscymnus gnomus Gordon, 1974

Species of beetle

Cephaloscymnus gnomus is a species of beetle of the family Coccinellidae. It is found in Mexico, where it has been recorded from San Luis Potosi.

== Description ==
Adults are small and nearly all black.
