= Prodilis isabel =

Scientific classification
- Kingdom: Animalia
- Phylum: Arthropoda
- Clade: Pancrustacea
- Class: Insecta
- Order: Coleoptera
- Suborder: Polyphaga
- Infraorder: Cucujiformia
- Family: Coccinellidae
- Genus: Prodilis
- Species: P. isabel

Binomial name
- Prodilis isabel Gordon & Hanley, 2017

Species of beetle

Prodilis isabel is a species of beetle of the family Coccinellidae. It is found in Colombia.

== Description ==
Adults reach a length of about 1.9 mm. Adults are black, the head is partly brown, while the remainder is yellow. The lateral one-fourth of the pronotum is brown and the elytron is brownish yellow with a brown border.
