= Prodilis unipunctata =

Scientific classification
- Kingdom: Animalia
- Phylum: Arthropoda
- Clade: Pancrustacea
- Class: Insecta
- Order: Coleoptera
- Suborder: Polyphaga
- Infraorder: Cucujiformia
- Family: Coccinellidae
- Genus: Prodilis
- Species: P. unipunctata

Binomial name
- Prodilis unipunctata (Gorham, 1897)

Synonyms
- Neaporia unipunctata Gorham, 1897

Species of beetle

Prodilis unipunctata is a species of beetle of the family Coccinellidae. It is found in Panama.

== Description ==
Adults reach a length of about 1.6 mm. Adults are black. The elytron is bluish black with a large reddish yellow spot.
