= Prodilis rosie =

Scientific classification
- Kingdom: Animalia
- Phylum: Arthropoda
- Clade: Pancrustacea
- Class: Insecta
- Order: Coleoptera
- Suborder: Polyphaga
- Infraorder: Cucujiformia
- Family: Coccinellidae
- Genus: Prodilis
- Species: P. rosie

Binomial name
- Prodilis rosie Gordon & Hanley, 2017

Species of beetle

Prodilis rosie is a species of beetle of the family Coccinellidae. It is found in Venezuela.

== Description ==
Adults reach a length of about 2.4 mm. Adults are black, with the apical half of the head yellow. The anterolateral angle of the pronotum is reddish yellow. The elytron has a large oval spot.
