= Prodilis angie =

Scientific classification
- Kingdom: Animalia
- Phylum: Arthropoda
- Clade: Pancrustacea
- Class: Insecta
- Order: Coleoptera
- Suborder: Polyphaga
- Infraorder: Cucujiformia
- Family: Coccinellidae
- Genus: Prodilis
- Species: P. angie

Binomial name
- Prodilis angie Gordon & Hanley, 2017

Species of beetle

Prodilis angie is a species of beetle of the family Coccinellidae. It is found in Tobago and Trinidad.

== Description ==
Adults reach a length of about 1.6 mm. Adults are black, while the head is mostly yellow with some black areas. The pronotum is black and the elytron has a large oval yellow spot.
