= Prodilis maryann =

Scientific classification
- Kingdom: Animalia
- Phylum: Arthropoda
- Clade: Pancrustacea
- Class: Insecta
- Order: Coleoptera
- Suborder: Polyphaga
- Infraorder: Cucujiformia
- Family: Coccinellidae
- Genus: Prodilis
- Species: P. maryann

Binomial name
- Prodilis maryann Gordon & Hanley, 2017

Species of beetle

Prodilis maryann is a species of beetle of the family Coccinellidae. It is found in Costa Rica.

== Description ==
Adults reach a length of about 2.4 mm. Adults are yellowish red, while the head is greenish black with the apical half yellow. The pronotum is greenish black wit the lateral one-fifth brown. The apical one-tenth of the elytron is darkened and the lateral border is yellow.
