= Cephaloscymnus occidentalis =

Scientific classification
- Kingdom: Animalia
- Phylum: Arthropoda
- Clade: Pancrustacea
- Class: Insecta
- Order: Coleoptera
- Suborder: Polyphaga
- Infraorder: Cucujiformia
- Family: Coccinellidae
- Genus: Cephaloscymnus
- Species: C. occidentalis

Binomial name
- Cephaloscymnus occidentalis Horn, 1895

Species of beetle

Cephaloscymnus occidentalis is a species of lady beetle in the family Coccinellidae. It is found in North America, where it has been recorded from Arizona to California, as well as in Texas and Mexico (Sonora).

== Description ==
Adults reach a length of about 1.85 to 2.10 mm. They have a brown body, while the pronotum is reddish brown.
