= Prodilis saopaulo =

Scientific classification
- Kingdom: Animalia
- Phylum: Arthropoda
- Clade: Pancrustacea
- Class: Insecta
- Order: Coleoptera
- Suborder: Polyphaga
- Infraorder: Cucujiformia
- Family: Coccinellidae
- Genus: Prodilis
- Species: P. saopaulo

Binomial name
- Prodilis saopaulo González & Větrovec, 2021

Species of beetle

Prodilis saopaulo is a species of beetle of the family Coccinellidae. It is found in Brazil (São Paulo).

== Description ==
Adults reach a length of about 2 mm (0.079 in). They have a black body, the elytra with a green metallic luster. The antennae are yellow. The ventral surface is black, except for the dark brown abdomen. The legs are yellow. The pubescence is yellowish white.

== Etymology ==
The species is named after the state of São Paulo, Brazil, where the species comes from.
