= Prodilis jan =

Scientific classification
- Kingdom: Animalia
- Phylum: Arthropoda
- Clade: Pancrustacea
- Class: Insecta
- Order: Coleoptera
- Suborder: Polyphaga
- Infraorder: Cucujiformia
- Family: Coccinellidae
- Genus: Prodilis
- Species: P. jan

Binomial name
- Prodilis jan Gordon & Hanley, 2017

Species of beetle

Prodilis jan is a species of beetle of the family Coccinellidae. It is found in Peru.

== Description ==
Adults reach a length of about 2 mm. Adults are black with a mostly pale yellow head with some black areas.
