= Prodilis shelley =

Scientific classification
- Kingdom: Animalia
- Phylum: Arthropoda
- Clade: Pancrustacea
- Class: Insecta
- Order: Coleoptera
- Suborder: Polyphaga
- Infraorder: Cucujiformia
- Family: Coccinellidae
- Genus: Prodilis
- Species: P. shelley

Binomial name
- Prodilis shelley Gordon & Hanley, 2017

Species of beetle

Prodilis shelley is a species of beetle of the family Coccinellidae. It is found in Brazil.

== Description ==
Adults reach a length of about 3.0–3.3 mm. Adults are greenish black and the head is yellow with some black areas. The pronotum is black with a yellow anterolateral angle.
