= Prodilis claire =

Scientific classification
- Kingdom: Animalia
- Phylum: Arthropoda
- Clade: Pancrustacea
- Class: Insecta
- Order: Coleoptera
- Suborder: Polyphaga
- Infraorder: Cucujiformia
- Family: Coccinellidae
- Genus: Prodilis
- Species: P. claire

Binomial name
- Prodilis claire Gordon & Hanley, 2017

Species of beetle

Prodilis claire is a species of beetle of the family Coccinellidae. It is found in Ecuador.

== Description ==
Adults reach a length of about 2.4 mm. Adults are bluish black, with the apical two-third of the head yellow. The lateral one-third of the pronotum is dark reddish brown and the lateral margin of the elytron is reddish brown.
