= Prodilis alberta =

Scientific classification
- Kingdom: Animalia
- Phylum: Arthropoda
- Clade: Pancrustacea
- Class: Insecta
- Order: Coleoptera
- Suborder: Polyphaga
- Infraorder: Cucujiformia
- Family: Coccinellidae
- Genus: Prodilis
- Species: P. alberta

Binomial name
- Prodilis alberta Gordon & Hanley, 2017

Species of beetle

Prodilis alberta is a species of beetle of the family Coccinellidae. It is found in Brazil.

== Description ==
Adults reach a length of about 2.6–2.7 mm. Adults are dark brown with a black head. The pronotum is dark brown, while the lateral one-fourth is reddish yellow.
