= Plotina (beetle) =

Scientific classification
- Kingdom: Animalia
- Phylum: Arthropoda
- Clade: Pancrustacea
- Class: Insecta
- Order: Coleoptera
- Suborder: Polyphaga
- Infraorder: Cucujiformia
- Family: Coccinellidae
- Subfamily: Coccinellinae
- Tribe: Plotinini
- Genus: Plotina (beetle); Miyatake, 1969

Genus of beetles

Plotina is a genus of beetles belonging to the family Coccinellidae.

== Species ==
- Plotina daweishanensis
- Plotina menghaiensis
- Plotina muelleri
- Plotina nanlingensis
- Plotina octomaculata
- Plotina quadrioculata
- Plotina signatella
- Plotina versicolor
