= Neaporia argentifrons =

Scientific classification
- Kingdom: Animalia
- Phylum: Arthropoda
- Clade: Pancrustacea
- Class: Insecta
- Order: Coleoptera
- Suborder: Polyphaga
- Infraorder: Cucujiformia
- Family: Coccinellidae
- Genus: Neaporia
- Species: N. argentifrons

Binomial name
- Neaporia argentifrons Gorham, 1899

Species of beetle

Neaporia argentifrons is a species of beetle of the family Coccinellidae. It is found in Guatemala and Mexico]].

== Description ==
Adults reach a length of about 2.3 mm. Adults are yellow, although the head and pronotum are greenish black and the elytron is reddish yellow.
