= Prodilis pastaza =

Scientific classification
- Kingdom: Animalia
- Phylum: Arthropoda
- Clade: Pancrustacea
- Class: Insecta
- Order: Coleoptera
- Suborder: Polyphaga
- Infraorder: Cucujiformia
- Family: Coccinellidae
- Genus: Prodilis
- Species: P. pastaza

Binomial name
- Prodilis pastaza González & Větrovec, 2021

Species of beetle

Prodilis pastaza is a species of beetle of the family Coccinellidae. It is found in Ecuador (Pastaza province).

== Description ==
Adults reach a length of about 2.2 mm (0.087 in). The head is black, with a golden yellow marking and yellow antennae. The pronotum is black with yellow lateral margins and anterior angles. The scutellum is reddish brown and the elytra have a red marking, and a yellow lateral border. The ventral surface is mostly brown and the abdomen is yellowish brown. The legs are yellow. The dorsal pubescence is white to greyish yellow.

== Etymology ==
The species is named after the province of Pastaza, Ecuador, where the species was collected.
