= Cephaloscymnus juanita =

Scientific classification
- Kingdom: Animalia
- Phylum: Arthropoda
- Clade: Pancrustacea
- Class: Insecta
- Order: Coleoptera
- Suborder: Polyphaga
- Infraorder: Cucujiformia
- Family: Coccinellidae
- Genus: Cephaloscymnus
- Species: C. juanita

Binomial name
- Cephaloscymnus juanita Gordon & Hanley, 2017

Species of beetle

Cephaloscymnus juanita is a species of beetle of the family Coccinellidae. It is found in Mexico, where it has been recorded from Oaxaca.

== Description ==
Adults reach a length of about 2.4 mm. Adults are black. The lateral one-fourth of the pronotum is yellow and the elytron is black with a green metallic tint.
