= Prodilis dubitalis =

Scientific classification
- Kingdom: Animalia
- Phylum: Arthropoda
- Clade: Pancrustacea
- Class: Insecta
- Order: Coleoptera
- Suborder: Polyphaga
- Infraorder: Cucujiformia
- Family: Coccinellidae
- Genus: Prodilis
- Species: P. dubitalis

Binomial name
- Prodilis dubitalis Gordon & Hanley, 2017

Species of beetle

Prodilis dubitalis is a species of beetle of the family Coccinellidae. It is found in Peru.

== Description ==
Adults reach a length of about 1.7 mm. Adults are black, the elytron with a small round spot.

== Etymology ==
The species name is derived from Latin dubitatio and refers to the doubtful generic placement.
