= Prodilis pallidifrons =

Scientific classification
- Kingdom: Animalia
- Phylum: Arthropoda
- Clade: Pancrustacea
- Class: Insecta
- Order: Coleoptera
- Suborder: Polyphaga
- Infraorder: Cucujiformia
- Family: Coccinellidae
- Genus: Prodilis
- Species: P. pallidifrons

Binomial name
- Prodilis pallidifrons Mulsant, 1850

Species of beetle

Prodilis pallidifrons is a species of beetle belonging to the family Coccinellidae. It is found in Colombia.

== Description ==
Adults are metallic blue, with the pronotum and head bluish black.
