= Neaporia laboulbenii =

Scientific classification
- Kingdom: Animalia
- Phylum: Arthropoda
- Clade: Pancrustacea
- Class: Insecta
- Order: Coleoptera
- Suborder: Polyphaga
- Infraorder: Cucujiformia
- Family: Coccinellidae
- Genus: Neaporia
- Species: N. laboulbenii

Binomial name
- Neaporia laboulbenii (Mulsant, 1850)

Synonyms
- Scymnus laboulbenii Mulsant, 1850

Species of beetle

Neaporia laboulbenii is a species of beetle of the family Coccinellidae. It is found in Panama, Brazil, Colombia and Venezuela.

== Description ==
Adults reach a length of about 1.9–2.0 mm. Adults are black with a brownish red head. The pronotum is dark brown with the lateral one-third reddish yellow. The elytron has three yellow spots.
