= Buprestodera =

Scientific classification
- Kingdom: Animalia
- Phylum: Arthropoda
- Clade: Pancrustacea
- Class: Insecta
- Order: Coleoptera
- Suborder: Polyphaga
- Infraorder: Cucujiformia
- Family: Coccinellidae
- Subfamily: Coccinellinae
- Tribe: Plotinini
- Genus: Buprestodera; Sicard, 1911

Genus of beetles

Buprestodera is a genus of beetles belonging to the family Coccinellidae.

== Species ==
- Buprestodera inornata
- Buprestodera mimetica
- Buprestodera reclusa
