= Prodilis kristine =

Scientific classification
- Kingdom: Animalia
- Phylum: Arthropoda
- Clade: Pancrustacea
- Class: Insecta
- Order: Coleoptera
- Suborder: Polyphaga
- Infraorder: Cucujiformia
- Family: Coccinellidae
- Genus: Prodilis
- Species: P. kristine

Binomial name
- Prodilis kristine Gordon & Hanley, 2017

Species of beetle

Prodilis kristine is a species of beetle of the family Coccinellidae. It is found in Panama.

== Description ==
Adults reach a length of about 2 mm. Adults are bluish black, while the head is mostly yellow with a black area. The pronotum is bluish black, but the anterolateral one-fourth are yellow.
