= Neaporia coelestis =

Scientific classification
- Kingdom: Animalia
- Phylum: Arthropoda
- Clade: Pancrustacea
- Class: Insecta
- Order: Coleoptera
- Suborder: Polyphaga
- Infraorder: Cucujiformia
- Family: Coccinellidae
- Genus: Neaporia
- Species: N. coelestis

Binomial name
- Neaporia coelestis Gorham, 1899

Species of beetle

Neaporia coelestis is a species of beetle of the family Coccinellidae. It is found in Panama.

== Description ==
Adults reach a length of about 2 mm. Adults are green, although the lateral and anterior borders of the pronotum are yellow.
