= Neaporia christy =

Scientific classification
- Kingdom: Animalia
- Phylum: Arthropoda
- Clade: Pancrustacea
- Class: Insecta
- Order: Coleoptera
- Suborder: Polyphaga
- Infraorder: Cucujiformia
- Family: Coccinellidae
- Genus: Neaporia
- Species: N. christy

Binomial name
- Neaporia christy Gordon & Hanley, 2017

Species of beetle

Neaporia christy is a species of beetle of the family Coccinellidae. It is found in Costa Rica.

== Description ==
Adults reach a length of about 1.7 mm. Adults are greenish black, with the lateral border of the pronotum yellow.
