= Protoplotina nigrosuturalis =

Scientific classification
- Kingdom: Animalia
- Phylum: Arthropoda
- Clade: Pancrustacea
- Class: Insecta
- Order: Coleoptera
- Suborder: Polyphaga
- Infraorder: Cucujiformia
- Family: Coccinellidae
- Genus: Protoplotina
- Species: P. nigrosuturalis

Binomial name
- Protoplotina nigrosuturalis Poorani, 2003

Species of beetle

Protoplotina nigrosuturalis is a species of beetle of the family Coccinellidae. It is found in India (Uttar Pradesh).

== Description ==
Adults reach a length of about 2 mm (0.079 in). The dorsal surface is pale yellowish brown, the elytra with a black stripe. The ventral surface is yellowish brown.
