= Plotinini =

Scientific classification
- Kingdom: Animalia
- Phylum: Arthropoda
- Clade: Pancrustacea
- Class: Insecta
- Order: Coleoptera
- Suborder: Polyphaga
- Infraorder: Cucujiformia
- Family: Coccinellidae
- Subfamily: Coccinellinae
- Tribe: Plotinini; Miyatake, 1994

Tribe of beetles

The Plotinini are a tribe of insects within the family Coccinellidae.

== Genera ==
- Ballida
- Buprestodera
- Catanoplotina
- Haemoplotina
- Paraplotina
- Plotina
- Protoplotina
- Sphaeroplotina
