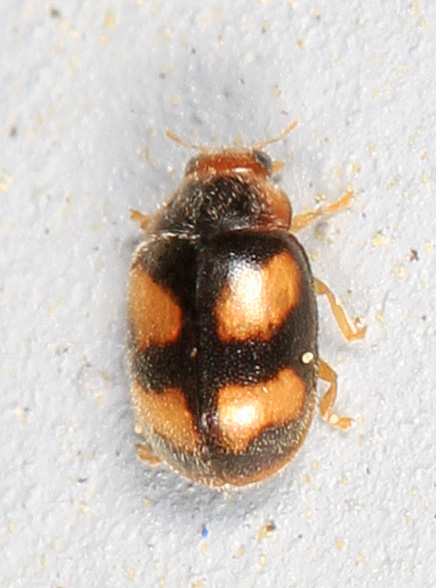
- Diomus amabilis
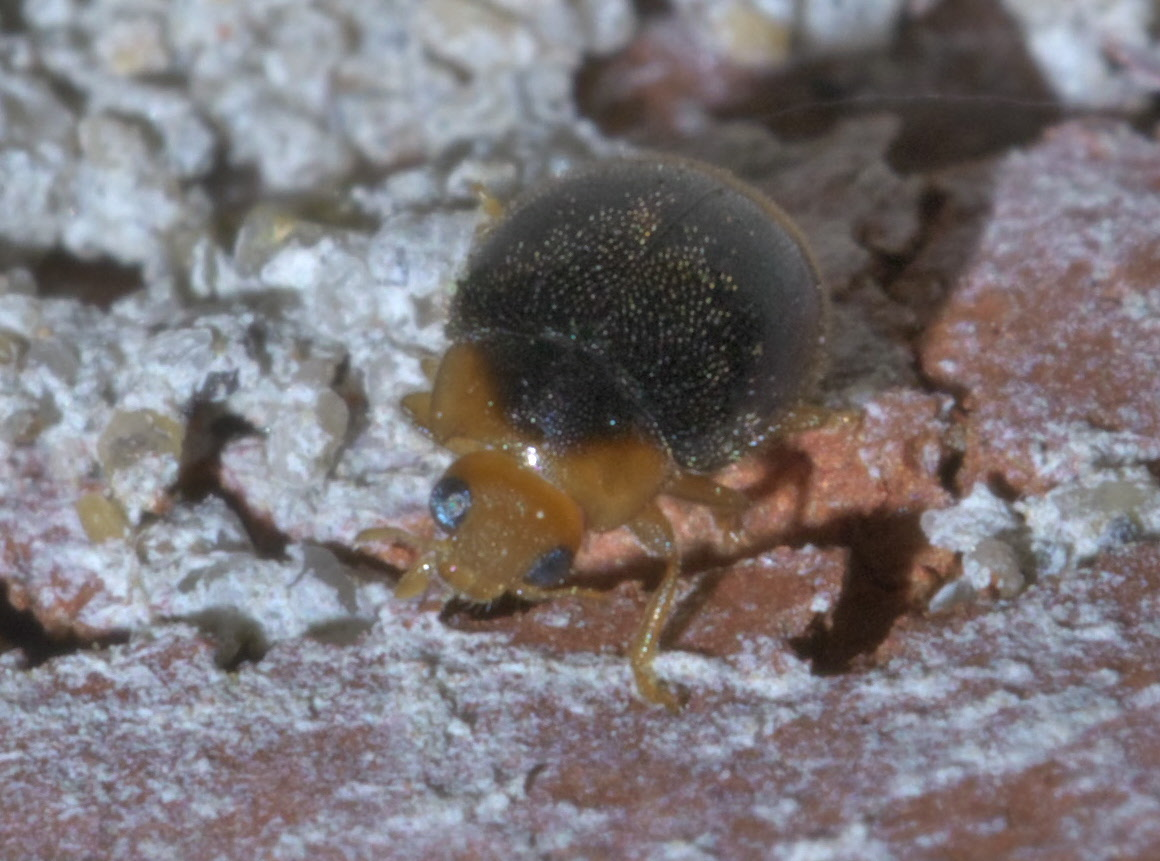
- Diomus terminatus

Scientific classification
- Kingdom: Animalia
- Phylum: Arthropoda
- Clade: Pancrustacea
- Class: Insecta
- Order: Coleoptera
- Suborder: Polyphaga
- Infraorder: Cucujiformia
- Family: Coccinellidae
- Subfamily: Coccinellinae
- Tribe: Diomini
- Genus: Diomus; Mulsant, 1850

Species
- 400+

= Diomus =

Genus of beetles

Diomus is a genus of lady beetles that belongs to the family Coccinellidae. It can be found worldwide.

It can grow to a length of 1.2-3.5 mm. Its body is a elongated oval that is weakly convex. The coloration of their body and elytra is variable.

== Distribution ==
Members of this genus can be found worldwide with many species occurring in tropical and subtropical regions including adjacent islands. They are mainly found in neotropical regions with more than 260 species described. The Australian region has 77 species with an estimated 140. Both the afrotropical and palaeartic regions contains 7 species and the oriental region contains 4 species.

== Taxonomy ==
This genus was originally described by Étienne Mulsant, a French entomologist and ornithologist, in 1850 as a subgenus of Scymnus. It was than elevated to its own genus in 1895 by Weise. However its status as its own genus within the tribe Scymnini or a subgenus of Scymnus was controversial. (Chapin, 1933) considered it its own genus immediately distinguishing it from Decadiomus. Some thought that it was a subgenus of Nephus. In 1999, Gordon suggested that this genus was a allogenic genus from Scymnini and proposed the tribe Diomini.

=== Species ===
This genus is probably one of the largest genera in the family Coccinellidae. This genus currently contains more than 400 described species worldwide with many species possibly being undescribed. A list of species belonging to this genus can be found below:

- Diomus akonis (Ohta, 1929)^{g}
- Diomus amabilis (LeConte, 1852)^{i c g b} (amiable lady)
- Diomus arizonicus Gordon, 1976^{i c g}
- Diomus austrinus Gordon, 1976^{i c g}
- Diomus balteatus (LeConte, 1878)^{i c g}
- Diomus bigemmeus (Horn, 1895)^{i c g b}
- Diomus caledoniensis (Bielawski, 1973)^{g}
- Diomus chiriqui González & Větrovec, 2021
- Diomus debilis (Leconte, 1852)^{i c g b}
- Diomus floridanus (Mulsant, 1850)^{i c g}
- Diomus gillerforsi Fursch, 1987^{g}
- Diomus humilis Gordon, 1976^{i c g}
- Diomus liebecki (Horn, 1895)^{i c g b} (Liebeck's lady)
- Diomus myrmidon (Mulsant, 1850)^{i c g}
- Diomus notescens (Blackburn, 1889)^{i}
- Diomus ochroderus (Mulsant, 1850)^{g}
- Diomus panamensis González & Větrovec, 2021
- Diomus pseudotaedatus Gordon, 1976^{i c g b}
- Diomus pumilio (Weise, 1885)^{i c g}
- Diomus roseicollis (Mulsant, 1853)^{i c g b}
- Diomus rubidus (Motschulsky, 1837)^{g}
- Diomus sekerkai González & Větrovec, 2021
- Diomus sexualis (Fauvel, 1903)^{g}
- Diomus taedatus (Fall, 1901)^{i c g}
- Diomus tetricus González, 2015
- Diomus terminatus (Say, 1835)^{i c g b}
- Diomus texanus Gordon, 1976^{i c g b}
- Diomus thoracicus (Fabricius, 1801)^{g}
- Diomus xanthaspis (Mulsant, 1850)^{i c g b}

Australian species

- Diomus ancorus Pang & Slipinski, 2009
- Diomus australasiae (Blackburn, 1892)
- Diomus australis (Blackburn, 1889)
- Diomus bimaculatus Pang & Slipinski, 2009
- Diomus brisbanensis (Blackburn, 1895)
- Diomus brookfieldi Pang & Slipinski, 2009
- Diomus bunya Pang & Slipinski, 2010
- Diomus capital Pang & Slipinski, 2009
- Diomus carbine Pang & Slipinski, 2010
- Diomus casuarinae (Blackburn, 1889)
- Diomus circus Pang & Slipinski, 2010
- Diomus corticalis (Lea, 1908)
- Diomus cowleyi (Blackburn, 1895)
- Diomus cucullifer (Blackburn, 1892)
- Diomus denhamensis Weise, 1929
- Diomus elutus (Lea, 1902)
- Diomus ementitor (Blackburn, 1895)
- Diomus ferrugineus Weise, 1895
- Diomus flavolaterus (Lea, 1926)
- Diomus frater (Lea, 1902)
- Diomus gilvus Pang & Slipinski, 2010
- Diomus gingera Pang & Slipinski, 2010
- Diomus hamatus Weise, 1895
- Diomus hebes Pang & Slipinski, 2010
- Diomus impictus (Blackburn, 1895)
- Diomus inaffectatus (Blackburn, 1892)
- Diomus insidiosus (Blackburn, 1889)
- Diomus inusitatus (Blackburn, 1889)
- Diomus jocosus (Blackburn, 1892)
- Diomus kamerungensis (Blackburn, 1895)
- Diomus kioloa Pang & Slipinski, 2010
- Diomus kosciuszko Pang & Slipinski, 2009
- Diomus kuranda Pang & Slipinski, 2009
- Diomus leai Pang & Slipinski, 2010
- Diomus lord Pang & Slipinski, 2010
- Diomus lubricus (Blackburn, 1889)
- Diomus macrops (Lea, 1929)
- Diomus maestus (Lea, 1926)
- Diomus mareebensis (Blackburn, 1895)
- Diomus marmorosus Pang & Slipinski, 2009
- Diomus micrus Pang & Slipinski, 2010
- Diomus millaamillaa Pang & Slipinski, 2009
- Diomus ningning Pang & Slipinski, 2009
- Diomus norfolcensis (Lea, 1929)
- Diomus notescens (Blackburn, 1889)
- Diomus obumbratus (Blackburn, 1895)
- Diomus operosus (Blackburn, 1895)
- Diomus pisinus Pang & Slipinski, 2010
- Diomus planulatus (Blackburn, 1895)
- Diomus poonindiensis (Blackburn, 1889)
- Diomus prodigialis Pang & Slipinski, 2010
- Diomus pumilio Weise, 1885
- Diomus reidi Pang & Slipinski, 2009
- Diomus robustus (Weise, 1929)
- Diomus scapularis (Weise, 1885)
- Diomus sedani (Blackburn, 1889)
- Diomus simplex (Blackburn, 1889)
- Diomus sphragitis (Weise, 1885)
- Diomus storeyi Pang & Slipinski, 2009
- Diomus striatus (Lea, 1902)
- Diomus subclarus (Blackburn, 1895)
- Diomus subelongatulus (Blackburn, 1892)
- Diomus sublatus (Blackburn, 1892)
- Diomus sydneyensis (Blackburn, 1892)
- Diomus tasmanicus Pang & Slipinski, 2010
- Diomus tenebricosus (Boheman, 1859)
- Diomus tinaroo Pang & Slipinski, 2009
- Diomus torres Pang & Slipinski, 2009
- Diomus triangularis (Lea, 1902)
- Diomus variiceps (Lea, 1929)
- Diomus victoriensis (Blackburn, 1892)
- Diomus villus Pang & Slipinski, 2010
- Diomus weiri Pang & Slipinski, 2009
- Diomus whittonensis (Blackburn, 1892)
- Diomus yarrensis (Blackburn, 1895)
- Diomus zborowskii Pang & Slipinski, 2009

Data sources: i = ITIS, c = Catalogue of Life, g = GBIF, b = Bugguide.net
