= Diomus villus =

Scientific classification
- Kingdom: Animalia
- Phylum: Arthropoda
- Clade: Pancrustacea
- Class: Insecta
- Order: Coleoptera
- Suborder: Polyphaga
- Infraorder: Cucujiformia
- Family: Coccinellidae
- Genus: Diomus
- Species: D. villus

Binomial name
- Diomus villus Pang & Slipinski, 2010

Species of beetle

Diomus villus is a species of beetle of the family Coccinellidae. It is found in Australia (northern Queensland).

== Description ==
Adults reach a length of about 1.5–1.7 mm (0.059–0.067 in). The head, antennae, legs and anterior and lateral portions of the pronotum are yellow, while a median stripe on the pronotum and the elytra are black. The dorsal surface is covered by silvery pubescence.

== Etymology ==
The species name is derived from Latin villus (meaning shaggy hair) and refers to a confused dorsal pubescence of the species.
