= Diomus sydneyensis =

Scientific classification
- Kingdom: Animalia
- Phylum: Arthropoda
- Clade: Pancrustacea
- Class: Insecta
- Order: Coleoptera
- Suborder: Polyphaga
- Infraorder: Cucujiformia
- Family: Coccinellidae
- Genus: Diomus
- Species: D. sydneyensis

Binomial name
- Diomus sydneyensis (Blackburn, 1892)

Synonyms
- Scymnus sydneyensis Blackburn, 1892; Scymnus mimicus Lea, 1902; Scymnus pectoralis Lea, 1902

Species of beetle

Diomus sydneyensis is a species of beetle of the family Coccinellidae. It is found in most of Australia.

== Description ==
Adults reach a length of about 1.8–2.6 mm (0.071–0.102 in). They are very variable in colour, but the head is usually yellow and the pronotum has the anterior and lateral regions yellow. The elytra are brown to black with red or yellow, often with unclear markings. The dorsal surface is covered by silvery pubescence.
