= Diomus corticalis =

Scientific classification
- Kingdom: Animalia
- Phylum: Arthropoda
- Clade: Pancrustacea
- Class: Insecta
- Order: Coleoptera
- Suborder: Polyphaga
- Infraorder: Cucujiformia
- Family: Coccinellidae
- Genus: Diomus
- Species: D. corticalis

Binomial name
- Diomus corticalis (Lea, 1908)

Synonyms
- Scymnus corticalis Lea, 1908

Species of beetle

Diomus corticalis is a species of beetle of the family Coccinellidae. It is found in Australia (Australian Capital Territory, New South Wales, Tasmania).

== Description ==
Adults reach a length of about 1.8–2.4 mm (0.071–0.094 in). The head, pronotum and elytra are mostly black, while the anterior pronotal angles and longitudinal fasciae on the elytra are orange to red. The dorsal surface is covered by whitish pubescence, forming wavy patterns.
