= Diomus tinaroo =

Scientific classification
- Kingdom: Animalia
- Phylum: Arthropoda
- Clade: Pancrustacea
- Class: Insecta
- Order: Coleoptera
- Suborder: Polyphaga
- Infraorder: Cucujiformia
- Family: Coccinellidae
- Genus: Diomus
- Species: D. tinaroo

Binomial name
- Diomus tinaroo Pang & Slipinski, 2009

Species of beetle

Diomus tinaroo is a species of beetle of the family Coccinellidae. It is found in Australia (northern Queensland).

== Description ==
Adults reach a length of about 2–2.3 mm (0.079–0.091 in). The head and pronotum are yellowish to light brown, while the elytra are light to dark brown with the sutural region a bit lighter. The dorsal surface is covered by yellowish pubescence forming a pattern of transverse bands on the elytra.

== Etymology ==
The species name refers to the Tinaroo Creek in Queensland.
