= Diomus circus =

Scientific classification
- Kingdom: Animalia
- Phylum: Arthropoda
- Clade: Pancrustacea
- Class: Insecta
- Order: Coleoptera
- Suborder: Polyphaga
- Infraorder: Cucujiformia
- Family: Coccinellidae
- Genus: Diomus
- Species: D. circus

Binomial name
- Diomus circus Pang & Slipinski, 2010

Species of beetle

Diomus circus is a species of beetle of the family Coccinellidae. It is found in Australia (Australian Capital Territory).

== Description ==
Adults reach a length of about 2.3–2.4 mm (0.091–0.094 in). The body is black, except for the yellow or orange central part of the head, antennae, legs and lateral parts of the pronotum. The dorsal surface is covered by silvery pubescence, forming a wavy pattern on the elytra.

== Etymology ==
The species name refers to the Piccadilly Circus (Brindabella Range, Australian Capital Territory), the type locality of this species.
