= Diomus bunya =

Scientific classification
- Kingdom: Animalia
- Phylum: Arthropoda
- Clade: Pancrustacea
- Class: Insecta
- Order: Coleoptera
- Suborder: Polyphaga
- Infraorder: Cucujiformia
- Family: Coccinellidae
- Genus: Diomus
- Species: D. bunya

Binomial name
- Diomus bunya Pang & Slipinski, 2010

Species of beetle

Diomus bunya is a species of beetle of the family Coccinellidae. It is found in Australia (New South Wales, Queensland, Northern Territory).

== Description ==
Adults reach a length of about 1.4–1.6 mm (0.055–0.063 in). The body is black, while the head, antennae, legs and anterior corners of the pronotum are orange brown. The dorsal surface is covered by whitish pubescence.

== Etymology ==
The species is named after the Bunya Mountains in Queensland.
