= Diomus kamerungensis =

Scientific classification
- Kingdom: Animalia
- Phylum: Arthropoda
- Clade: Pancrustacea
- Class: Insecta
- Order: Coleoptera
- Suborder: Polyphaga
- Infraorder: Cucujiformia
- Family: Coccinellidae
- Genus: Diomus
- Species: D. kamerungensis

Binomial name
- Diomus kamerungensis (Blackburn, 1895)

Synonyms
- Scymnus kamerungensis Blackburn, 1895

Species of beetle

Diomus kamerungensis is a species of beetle of the family Coccinellidae. It is found in Australia (northern New South Wales, Queensland, Northern Territory).

== Description ==
Adults reach a length of about 2.4–3.4 mm (0.094–0.134 in). The head and most of the pronotum are yellow, but the central area, as well as the elytra are black. The antennae and legs are yellowish or brown. The dorsal surface is covered by whitish pubescence.
