= Diomus micrus =

Scientific classification
- Kingdom: Animalia
- Phylum: Arthropoda
- Clade: Pancrustacea
- Class: Insecta
- Order: Coleoptera
- Suborder: Polyphaga
- Infraorder: Cucujiformia
- Family: Coccinellidae
- Genus: Diomus
- Species: D. micrus

Binomial name
- Diomus micrus Pang & Slipinski, 2010

Species of beetle

Diomus micrus is a species of beetle of the family Coccinellidae. It is found in Australia (Victoria, Australian Capital Territory).

== Description ==
Adults reach a length of about 1.3–1.6 mm (0.051–0.063 in). The head, antennae and legs are yellow, while the pronotum is black with yellow anterior and lateral bands. The elytra are dark brown to black. The dorsal surface is covered by whitish pubescence.

== Etymology ==
The species name is an arbitrary combination of letters.
