= Diomus gilvus =

Scientific classification
- Kingdom: Animalia
- Phylum: Arthropoda
- Clade: Pancrustacea
- Class: Insecta
- Order: Coleoptera
- Suborder: Polyphaga
- Infraorder: Cucujiformia
- Family: Coccinellidae
- Genus: Diomus
- Species: D. gilvus

Binomial name
- Diomus gilvus Pang & Slipinski, 2010

Species of beetle

Diomus gilvus is a species of beetle of the family Coccinellidae. It is found in Australia (Queensland, Western Australia, Northern Territory).

== Description ==
Adults reach a length of about 1.6–1.7 mm (0.063–0.067 in). The body is yellow to yellowish-brown, sometimes with the elytral suture slightly darker than the disc. The dorsal surface is shiny, with the pronotum and elytra finely and densely punctate with punctures of similar sizes. The dorsum is covered by yellowish pubescence.

== Etymology ==
The species name is derived from Latin gilvus (meaning pale, yellowish).
