= Diomus leai =

Scientific classification
- Kingdom: Animalia
- Phylum: Arthropoda
- Clade: Pancrustacea
- Class: Insecta
- Order: Coleoptera
- Suborder: Polyphaga
- Infraorder: Cucujiformia
- Family: Coccinellidae
- Genus: Diomus
- Species: D. leai

Binomial name
- Diomus leai Pang & Slipinski, 2010

Species of beetle

Diomus leai is a species of beetle of the family Coccinellidae. It is found in Australia (Tasmania).

== Description ==
Adults reach a length of about 0.6–0.8 mm (0.024–0.031 in). The frons (or sometimes entire head), antennae, legs, and anterior angles of the pronotum are yellowish, while the rest of the pronotum and elytra are brown to black. The dorsal surface is shiny and covered by silvery pubescence.

== Etymology ==
The species is dedicated to Arthur Mills Lea, who collected the type series.
