= Diomus pisinus =

Scientific classification
- Kingdom: Animalia
- Phylum: Arthropoda
- Clade: Pancrustacea
- Class: Insecta
- Order: Coleoptera
- Suborder: Polyphaga
- Infraorder: Cucujiformia
- Family: Coccinellidae
- Genus: Diomus
- Species: D. pisinus

Binomial name
- Diomus pisinus Pang & Slipinski, 2010

Species of beetle

Diomus pisinus is a species of beetle of the family Coccinellidae. It is found in Australia (Norfolk Island, Philip Island).

== Description ==
Adults reach a length of about 0.6–1.2 mm (0.024–0.047 in). The head, antennae, legs, most of the pronotum and lateral parts of the elytra are yellowish brown, while the central part of the pronotum and a triangular marking on the elytra are dark brown. The dorsal surface is sparsely setose and shiny. The setae are very short.

== Etymology ==
The species name is derived from Latin pisinus (meaning very small).
