= Diomus sekerkai =

Scientific classification
- Kingdom: Animalia
- Phylum: Arthropoda
- Clade: Pancrustacea
- Class: Insecta
- Order: Coleoptera
- Suborder: Polyphaga
- Infraorder: Cucujiformia
- Family: Coccinellidae
- Genus: Diomus
- Species: D. sekerkai

Binomial name
- Diomus sekerkai González & Větrovec, 2021

Species of beetle

Diomus sekerkai is a species of beetle of the family Coccinellidae. It is found in Panama (Panama province).

== Description ==
Adults reach a length of about 1.6 mm (0.063 in). The head, antennae and pronotum are yellow. The scutellum and elytra are black. The ventral surface is mostly yellow and the abdomen is brown. The legs are yellow and the pubescence whitish.

== Etymology ==
The species is dedicated to the Chrysomelidae specialist Lukas Sekerka, who fist collected the species.
