= Diomus bimaculatus =

Scientific classification
- Kingdom: Animalia
- Phylum: Arthropoda
- Clade: Pancrustacea
- Class: Insecta
- Order: Coleoptera
- Suborder: Polyphaga
- Infraorder: Cucujiformia
- Family: Coccinellidae
- Genus: Diomus
- Species: D. bimaculatus

Binomial name
- Diomus bimaculatus Pang & Slipinski, 2009

Species of beetle

Diomus bimaculatus is a species of beetle of the family Coccinellidae. It is found in Australia (Queensland).

== Description ==
Adults reach a length of about 1.4–1.6 mm (0.055–0.063 in). The head and pronotum are yellow, although the pronotum is sometimes orange with a darker median area. The elytra are dark brown to black with yellowish spots. The dorsal surface is covered by white or silvery pubescence.

== Etymology ==
The species name refers to the bi-maculate elytra.
