= Diomus obumbratus =

Scientific classification
- Kingdom: Animalia
- Phylum: Arthropoda
- Clade: Pancrustacea
- Class: Insecta
- Order: Coleoptera
- Suborder: Polyphaga
- Infraorder: Cucujiformia
- Family: Coccinellidae
- Genus: Diomus
- Species: D. obumbratus

Binomial name
- Diomus obumbratus (Blackburn, 1895)

Synonyms
- Scymnus obumbratus Blackburn, 1895

Species of beetle

Diomus obumbratus is a species of beetle of the family Coccinellidae. It is found in Australia (New South Wales, southern Queensland).

== Description ==
Adults reach a length of about 2–2.5 mm (0.079–0.098 in). The head is yellowish, while the rest of the body is light brown with the pronotum (except for the anterior and lateral areas) darker than the elytra. The dorsal surface is covered by yellowish pubescence, forming wavy patterns on the elytra.
