= Decadiomus austrinus =

Scientific classification
- Kingdom: Animalia
- Phylum: Arthropoda
- Class: Insecta
- Order: Coleoptera
- Suborder: Polyphaga
- Infraorder: Cucujiformia
- Family: Coccinellidae
- Genus: Decadiomus
- Species: D. austrinus

Binomial name
- Decadiomus austrinus (Sicard, 1910)

Synonyms
- Epilachna austrina Sicard, 1910; Decadiomus seini Segarra, 2014

Species of beetle

Decadiomus austrinus is a species of beetle of the family Coccinellidae. It is found in Brazil, Uruguay and Puerto Rico.

== Description ==
Adults reach a length of about 7.08–9.48 mm. Adults are yellow, while the pronotum, head and legs are black. The elytron is pale yellow with a piceous border .
