= Diomus brookfieldi =

Scientific classification
- Kingdom: Animalia
- Phylum: Arthropoda
- Clade: Pancrustacea
- Class: Insecta
- Order: Coleoptera
- Suborder: Polyphaga
- Infraorder: Cucujiformia
- Family: Coccinellidae
- Genus: Diomus
- Species: D. brookfieldi

Binomial name
- Diomus brookfieldi Pang & Slipinski, 2009

Species of beetle

Diomus brookfieldi is a species of beetle of the family Coccinellidae. It is found in Australia (South Australia).

== Description ==
Adults reach a length of about 1.7–2.1 mm (0.067–0.083 in). The head, pronotum and elytra are dark brown to black, while the antennae and legs are brown. The dorsal surface is covered by silvery pubescence.

== Etymology ==
The species name refers to the type locality, the Brookfield Conservation Park.
