= Diomus cowleyi =

Scientific classification
- Kingdom: Animalia
- Phylum: Arthropoda
- Clade: Pancrustacea
- Class: Insecta
- Order: Coleoptera
- Suborder: Polyphaga
- Infraorder: Cucujiformia
- Family: Coccinellidae
- Genus: Diomus
- Species: D. cowleyi

Binomial name
- Diomus cowleyi (Blackburn, 1895)

Synonyms
- Scymnus cowleyi Blackburn, 1895

Species of beetle

Diomus cowleyi is a species of beetle of the family Coccinellidae. It is found in Australia (northern Queensland).

== Description ==
Adults reach a length of about 2.9 mm (0.11 in). The head, antennae and pronotum are yellowish to orange, while the elytra are back with orange apices. The dorsal surface is shiny and covered by silvery pubescence.
