= Diomus insidiosus =

Scientific classification
- Kingdom: Animalia
- Phylum: Arthropoda
- Clade: Pancrustacea
- Class: Insecta
- Order: Coleoptera
- Suborder: Polyphaga
- Infraorder: Cucujiformia
- Family: Coccinellidae
- Genus: Diomus
- Species: D. insidiosus

Binomial name
- Diomus insidiosus (Blackburn, 1889)

Synonyms
- Scymnus insidiosus Blackburn, 1889; Scymnus insidiosus var. pallipes Blackburn, 1889; Scymnus insidiosus var. major Blackburn, 1889; Scymnus blackburni Weise, 1929

Species of beetle

Diomus insidiosus is a species of beetle of the family Coccinellidae. It is found in eastern Australia.

== Description ==
Adults reach a length of about 1.7–2.2 mm (0.067–0.087 in). They are variable in colour, but the head, pronotum, antennae and legs are usually yellowish, while the elytra are dark brown to almost black with two yellowish markings. The dorsal surface is covered by yellowish pubescence, forming wavy patterns on the elytra.
