= Diomus norfolcensis =

Scientific classification
- Kingdom: Animalia
- Phylum: Arthropoda
- Clade: Pancrustacea
- Class: Insecta
- Order: Coleoptera
- Suborder: Polyphaga
- Infraorder: Cucujiformia
- Family: Coccinellidae
- Genus: Diomus
- Species: D. norfolcensis

Binomial name
- Diomus norfolcensis (Lea, 1929)

Synonyms
- Scymnus flavifrons var. norfolcensis Lea, 1929

Species of beetle

Diomus norfolcensis is a species of beetle of the family Coccinellidae. It is found in Australia (Norfolk Island, Phillip Island).

== Description ==
Adults reach a length of about 1.8–2.1 mm (0.071–0.083 in). The head, antennae, legs, and anterior corners of the pronotum are yellowish, while the elytra and the rest of the pronotum are dark brown to black. The dorsal surface is shiny with silver setae, forming a wavy pattern on the elytra.
