= Diomus tetricus =

Scientific classification
- Kingdom: Animalia
- Phylum: Arthropoda
- Clade: Pancrustacea
- Class: Insecta
- Order: Coleoptera
- Suborder: Polyphaga
- Infraorder: Cucujiformia
- Family: Coccinellidae
- Genus: Diomus
- Species: D. tetricus

Binomial name
- Diomus tetricus González, 2015

Species of beetle

Diomus tetricus is a species of beetle of the family Coccinellidae. It is found in Ecuador.

== Description ==
Adults reach a length of about 2.1 mm. Adults are black with a light brown pronotum and yellow to brown legs.
