= Diomus striatus =

Scientific classification
- Kingdom: Animalia
- Phylum: Arthropoda
- Clade: Pancrustacea
- Class: Insecta
- Order: Coleoptera
- Suborder: Polyphaga
- Infraorder: Cucujiformia
- Family: Coccinellidae
- Genus: Diomus
- Species: D. striatus

Binomial name
- Diomus striatus (Lea, 1902)

Synonyms
- Scymnus striatus Lea, 1902

Species of beetle

Diomus striatus is a species of beetle of the family Coccinellidae. It is found in Australia (Northern Territory, Western Australia).

== Description ==
Adults reach a length of about 1.7–2.2 mm (0.067–0.087 in). The head and pronotum are yellow or orange, while the elytra are dark brown to black, with two yellowish bands. The dorsal surface is covered by silvery pubescence.
