= Diomus jocosus =

Scientific classification
- Kingdom: Animalia
- Phylum: Arthropoda
- Clade: Pancrustacea
- Class: Insecta
- Order: Coleoptera
- Suborder: Polyphaga
- Infraorder: Cucujiformia
- Family: Coccinellidae
- Genus: Diomus
- Species: D. jocosus

Binomial name
- Diomus jocosus (Blackburn, 1892)

Synonyms
- Scymnus jocosus Blackburn, 1892

Species of beetle

Diomus jocosus is a species of beetle of the family Coccinellidae. It is found in Australia (central and northern New South Wales, Queensland).

== Description ==
Adults reach a length of about 1.7–2.2 mm (0.067–0.087 in). The head and most of the pronotum, as well as the ground colour of the elytra are black. The anterior margin of the pronotum is yellow. The elytra have four spots. The dorsal surface is covered by silvery pubescence.
