= Diomus sublatus =

Scientific classification
- Kingdom: Animalia
- Phylum: Arthropoda
- Clade: Pancrustacea
- Class: Insecta
- Order: Coleoptera
- Suborder: Polyphaga
- Infraorder: Cucujiformia
- Family: Coccinellidae
- Genus: Diomus
- Species: D. sublatus

Binomial name
- Diomus sublatus (Blackburn, 1892)

Synonyms
- Scymnus sublatus Blackburn, 1892

Species of beetle

Diomus sublatus is a species of beetle of the family Coccinellidae. It is found in Australia (New South Wales, southern Queensland).

== Description ==
Adults reach a length of about 1.6–2 mm (0.063–0.079 in). The head, antennae, legs and most of the pronotum are yellowish or orange, while a medio-basal spot on the pronotum and the elytra are black. The dorsal surface is covered by silvery pubescence.
