= Diomus pseudotaedatus =

Scientific classification
- Kingdom: Animalia
- Phylum: Arthropoda
- Class: Insecta
- Order: Coleoptera
- Suborder: Polyphaga
- Infraorder: Cucujiformia
- Family: Coccinellidae
- Genus: Diomus
- Species: D. pseudotaedatus

Binomial name
- Diomus pseudotaedatus Gordon, 1976

Species of beetle

Diomus pseudotaedatus is a species of lady beetle in the family Coccinellidae. It is found in North America.
