= Diomus yarrensis =

Scientific classification
- Kingdom: Animalia
- Phylum: Arthropoda
- Clade: Pancrustacea
- Class: Insecta
- Order: Coleoptera
- Suborder: Polyphaga
- Infraorder: Cucujiformia
- Family: Coccinellidae
- Genus: Diomus
- Species: D. yarrensis

Binomial name
- Diomus yarrensis (Blackburn, 1895)

Synonyms
- Scymnus yarrensis Blackburn, 1895

Species of beetle

Diomus yarrensis is a species of beetle of the family Coccinellidae. It is found in Australia (Victoria).

== Description ==
Adults reach a length of about 1.7 mm (0.067 in). The head, antennae and legs are yellow, while the pronotum is black with broad orange lateral margins and the elytra are black with an orange apical area extending forward as a narrow stripe. The dorsal surface is shiny and covered by whitish pubescence.
