= Diomus kosciuszko =

Scientific classification
- Kingdom: Animalia
- Phylum: Arthropoda
- Clade: Pancrustacea
- Class: Insecta
- Order: Coleoptera
- Suborder: Polyphaga
- Infraorder: Cucujiformia
- Family: Coccinellidae
- Genus: Diomus
- Species: D. kosciuszko

Binomial name
- Diomus kosciuszko Pang & Slipinski, 2009

Species of beetle

Diomus kosciuszko is a species of beetle of the family Coccinellidae. It is found in Australia (Australian Capital Territory, southern New South Wales).

== Description ==
Adults reach a length of about 2.2–2.7 mm (0.087–0.106 in). The head and most of the pronotum (except for a darker area at the base) are brown. Sometimes, the body is entirely brown or the pronotum brown with a median darker area. The antennae and legs are yellowish or brown. The dorsal surface is covered by whitish pubescence forming whirly patterns.

== Etymology ==
The species name refers to its type locality, the Kosciuszko National Park.
