= Diomus millaamillaa =

Scientific classification
- Kingdom: Animalia
- Phylum: Arthropoda
- Clade: Pancrustacea
- Class: Insecta
- Order: Coleoptera
- Suborder: Polyphaga
- Infraorder: Cucujiformia
- Family: Coccinellidae
- Genus: Diomus
- Species: D. millaamillaa

Binomial name
- Diomus millaamillaa Pang & Slipinski, 2009

Species of beetle

Diomus millaamillaa is a species of beetle of the family Coccinellidae. It is found in Australia (Queensland).

== Description ==
Adults reach a length of about 1.5–1.8 mm (0.059–0.071 in). The head is yellow, while the pronotum is yellow with a black basal area. The elytra are black with two yellowish spots. The dorsal surface is covered by white or silvery pubescence.

== Etymology ==
The species name refers to its type locality, Millaa Millaa on the Atherton Tableland.
