= Diomus tenebricosus =

Scientific classification
- Kingdom: Animalia
- Phylum: Arthropoda
- Clade: Pancrustacea
- Class: Insecta
- Order: Coleoptera
- Suborder: Polyphaga
- Infraorder: Cucujiformia
- Family: Coccinellidae
- Genus: Diomus
- Species: D. tenebricosus

Binomial name
- Diomus tenebricosus (Boheman, 1859)

Synonyms
- Scymnus tenebricosus Boheman, 1859

Species of beetle

Diomus tenebricosus is a species of beetle of the family Coccinellidae. It is found in Australia (Australian Capital Territory, Northern Territory, South Australia).

== Description ==
Adults reach a length of about 1.3–1.9 mm (0.051–0.075 in). The head and a band along the anterior edge of the pronotum are yellowish or orange, while the rest of the pronotum and elytra are dark brown to black, often with a vague reddish apical area. The antennae and legs are yellowish-brown. The dorsal surface is covered by whitish pubescence, forming wavy patterns on the elytra.
