= Diomus kuranda =

Scientific classification
- Kingdom: Animalia
- Phylum: Arthropoda
- Clade: Pancrustacea
- Class: Insecta
- Order: Coleoptera
- Suborder: Polyphaga
- Infraorder: Cucujiformia
- Family: Coccinellidae
- Genus: Diomus
- Species: D. kuranda

Binomial name
- Diomus kuranda Pang & Slipinski, 2009

Species of beetle

Diomus kuranda is a species of beetle of the family Coccinellidae. It is found in Australia (northern Queensland).

== Description ==
Adults reach a length of about 1.9–2.2 mm (0.075–0.087 in). The head and most of the pronotum are yellow or orange, the latter with a black marking at the base. The elytra are blackish with a red or deep orange fascia. The dorsal surface is covered by whitish pubescence.

== Etymology ==
The species name refers to its type locality, Kuranda in Queensland.
