= Diomus chiriqui =

Scientific classification
- Kingdom: Animalia
- Phylum: Arthropoda
- Clade: Pancrustacea
- Class: Insecta
- Order: Coleoptera
- Suborder: Polyphaga
- Infraorder: Cucujiformia
- Family: Coccinellidae
- Genus: Diomus
- Species: D. chiriqui

Binomial name
- Diomus chiriqui González & Větrovec, 2021

Species of beetle

Diomus chiriqui is a species of beetle of the family Coccinellidae. It is found in Panama (Chiriquí).

== Description ==
Adults reach a length of about 2.4–2.6 mm (0.094–0.102 in). Males have a yellow head and antennae and a yellow pronotum. The scutellum and elytra are black. The ventral surface is black, the abdomen brown and the legs mostly yellow. The pubescence is yellowish white. Females are entirely black.

== Etymology ==
The species is named after the province of Chiriquí, Panama, where the holotype was collected.
