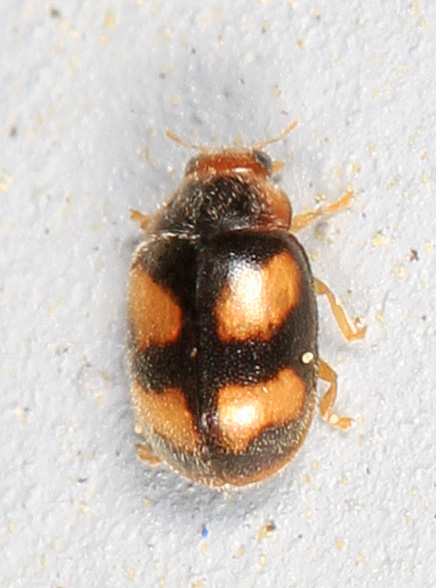

Scientific classification
- Kingdom: Animalia
- Phylum: Arthropoda
- Class: Insecta
- Order: Coleoptera
- Suborder: Polyphaga
- Infraorder: Cucujiformia
- Family: Coccinellidae
- Genus: Diomus
- Species: D. amabilis

Binomial name
- Diomus amabilis (LeConte, 1852)

= Diomus amabilis =

Species of beetle

Diomus amabilis, the amiable lady, is a species of lady beetle in the family Coccinellidae. It is found in North America.

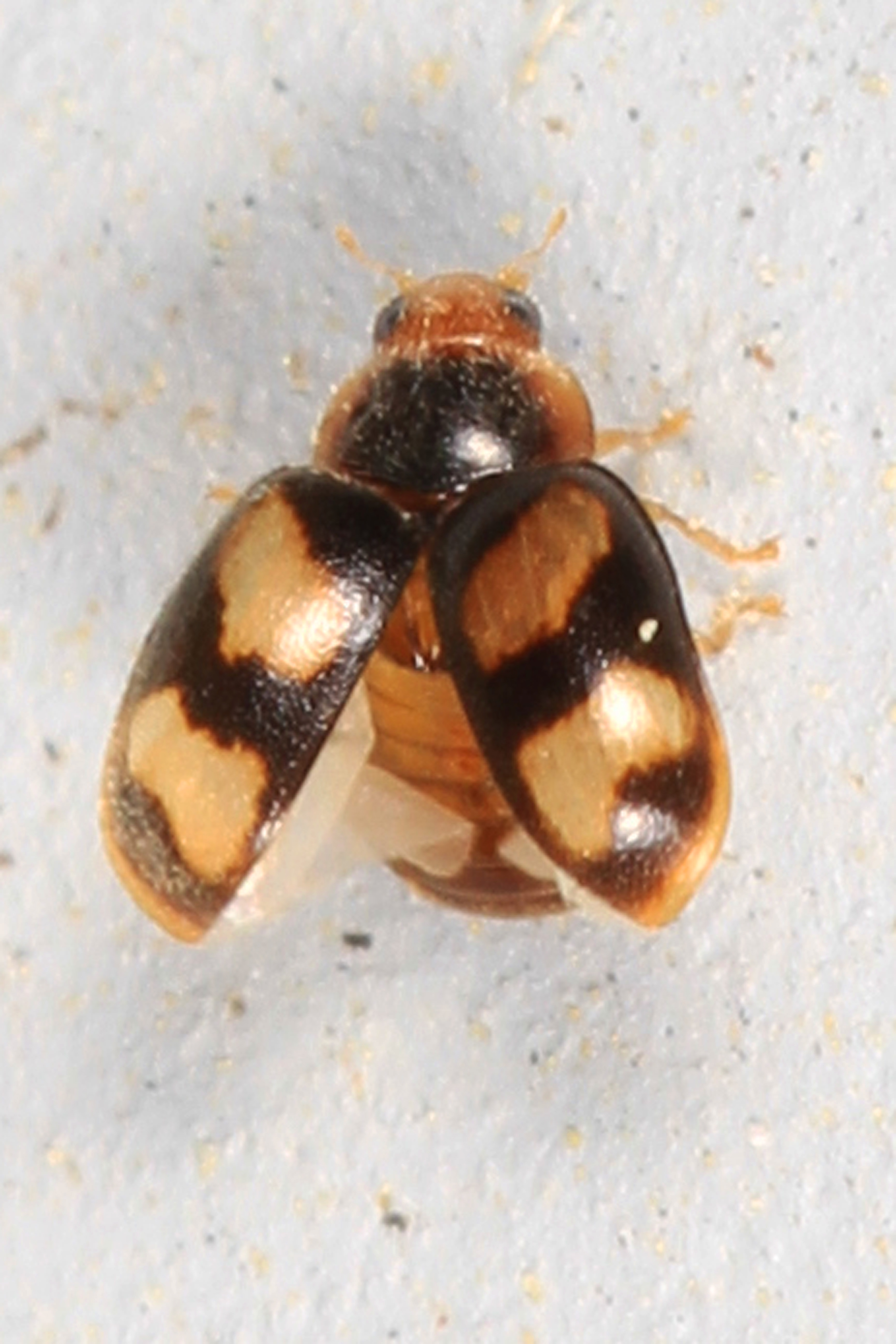
Amiable lady, Diomus amabilis
