= Diomus weiri =

Scientific classification
- Kingdom: Animalia
- Phylum: Arthropoda
- Clade: Pancrustacea
- Class: Insecta
- Order: Coleoptera
- Suborder: Polyphaga
- Infraorder: Cucujiformia
- Family: Coccinellidae
- Genus: Diomus
- Species: D. weiri

Binomial name
- Diomus weiri Pang & Slipinski, 2009

Species of beetle

Diomus weiri is a species of beetle of the family Coccinellidae. It is found in Australia (Western Australia).

== Description ==
Adults reach a length of about 1.6–1.7 mm (0.063–0.067 in). The head, pronotum and most of the elytra are yellowish. The central part of the pronotum at the base, and the elytral base and apical spots are black. The antennae and legs are yellowish or brown. The dorsal surface is covered by whitish pubescence.

== Etymology ==
The species is dedicated to Tom Weir of the Australian National Insect Collection, the collector of the species.
