= Diomus tasmanicus =

Scientific classification
- Kingdom: Animalia
- Phylum: Arthropoda
- Clade: Pancrustacea
- Class: Insecta
- Order: Coleoptera
- Suborder: Polyphaga
- Infraorder: Cucujiformia
- Family: Coccinellidae
- Genus: Diomus
- Species: D. tasmanicus

Binomial name
- Diomus tasmanicus Pang & Slipinski, 2010

Species of beetle

Diomus tasmanicus is a species of beetle of the family Coccinellidae. It is found in Australia (Tasmania).

== Description ==
Adults reach a length of about 2.2–2.4 mm (0.087–0.094 in). The head, antennae and legs are yellowish brown, while the pronotum and elytra are dark brown to almost black. The dorsal surface is covered by yellowish pubescence, forming a wavy pattern on the elytra.

== Etymology ==
The species name is derived from the state of Tasmania.
