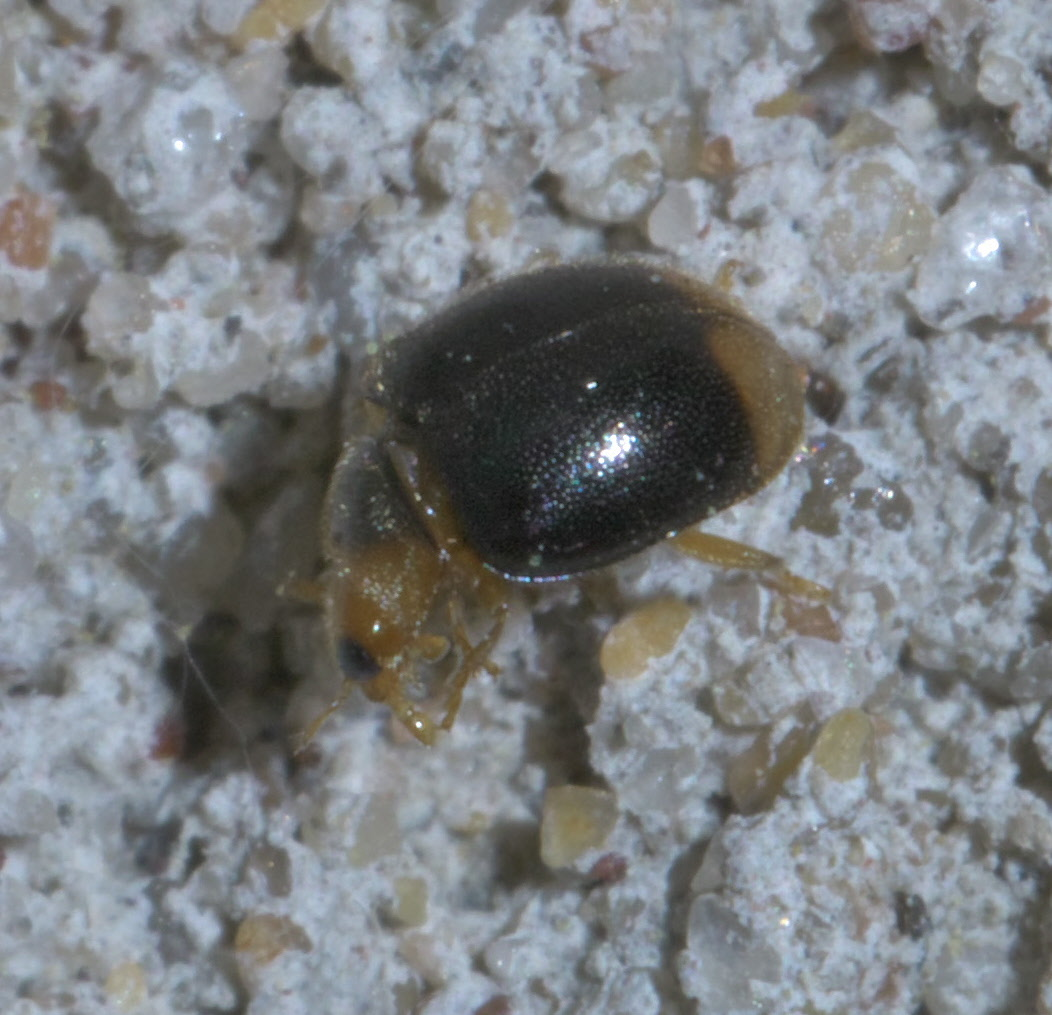

Scientific classification
- Kingdom: Animalia
- Phylum: Arthropoda
- Class: Insecta
- Order: Coleoptera
- Suborder: Polyphaga
- Infraorder: Cucujiformia
- Family: Coccinellidae
- Genus: Diomus
- Species: D. terminatus

Binomial name
- Diomus terminatus (Say, 1835)

Synonyms
- Scymnus terminatus Say, 1835; Scymnus femoralis LeConte, 1852; Scymnus partitus Casey, 1899

= Diomus terminatus =

Species of beetle

Diomus terminatus is a species of lady beetle in the family Coccinellidae. It is found in throughout eastern North America. It has also been recorded from Bermuda.

== Description ==
It is brown and oval-shaped, with a reddish tinge at the back portion of its elytra, and about 1.5 to 2 mm. It is covered in gold-colored setae, giving it a slightly hairy appearance.

== Biology ==
Its prey likely includes aphids, scale, and mealybugs.

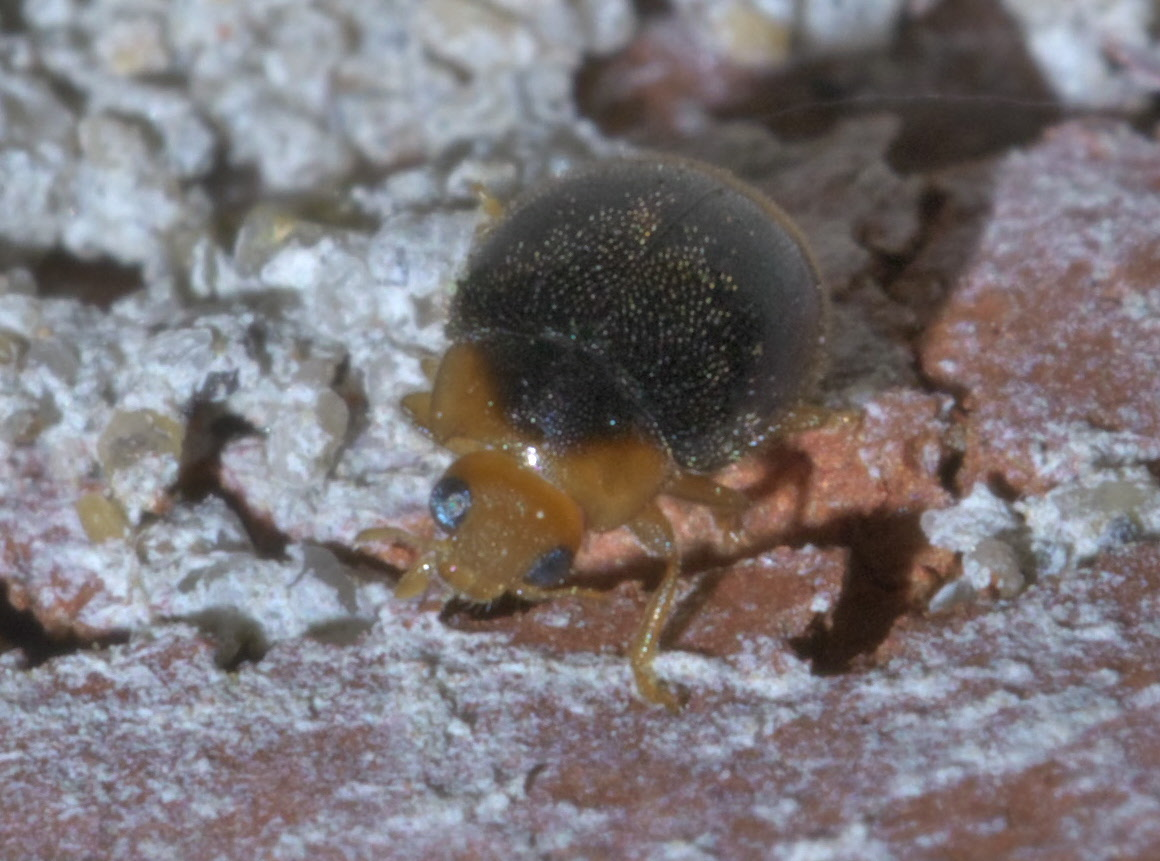
