= Diomus inaffectatus =

Scientific classification
- Kingdom: Animalia
- Phylum: Arthropoda
- Clade: Pancrustacea
- Class: Insecta
- Order: Coleoptera
- Suborder: Polyphaga
- Infraorder: Cucujiformia
- Family: Coccinellidae
- Genus: Diomus
- Species: D. inaffectatus

Binomial name
- Diomus inaffectatus (Blackburn, 1892)

Synonyms
- Scymnus inaffectatus Blackburn, 1892

Species of beetle

Diomus inaffectatus is a species of beetle of the family Coccinellidae. It is found in Australia (Victoria, Tasmania, southern New South Wales).

== Description ==
Adults reach a length of about 1.7–2 mm (0.067–0.079 in). The head, antennae, legs, pronotum and abdomen are yellowish, while a medio-basal spot on the pronotum, the rest of the ventral side and the elytra are dark brown to black. The dorsal surface is shiny and covered by yellowish pubescence, forming a wavy pattern on the elytra.
