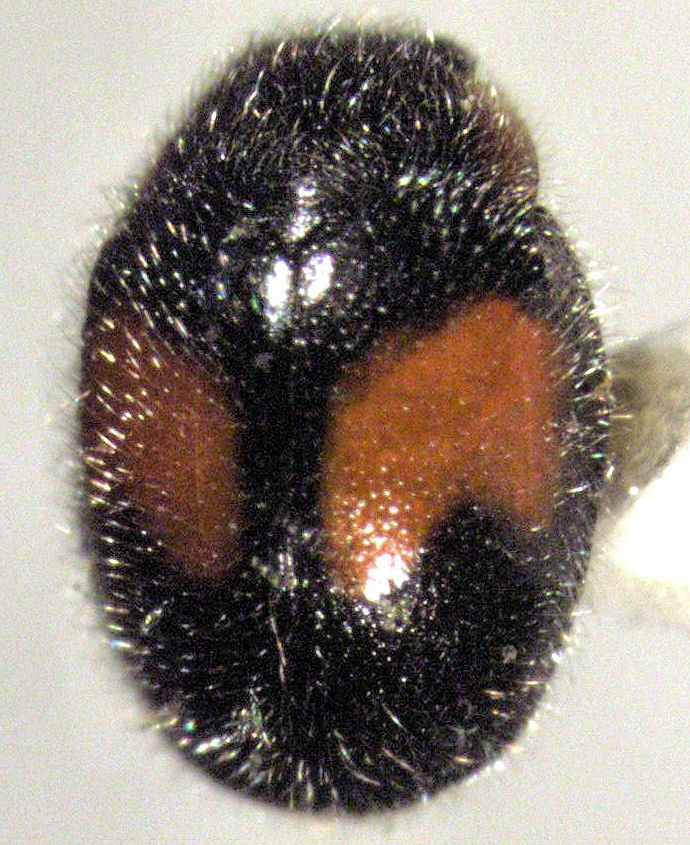

Scientific classification
- Kingdom: Animalia
- Phylum: Arthropoda
- Clade: Pancrustacea
- Class: Insecta
- Order: Coleoptera
- Suborder: Polyphaga
- Infraorder: Cucujiformia
- Family: Coccinellidae
- Genus: Diomus
- Species: D. notescens

Binomial name
- Diomus notescens (Blackburn, 1889)

Synonyms
- Scymnus notescens Blackburn, 1889; Diomus rusticus Weise, 1895

= Diomus notescens =

Species of beetle

Diomus notescens, the minute two-spotted ladybird, is a ladybird species endemic to the east and south of Australia.

== Description ==
This small beetle is only 2.5 millimetres long. It is a deep shade of greenish-black with two large reddish-brown patches on the elytra. It is covered with very short pubescence.
