= Diomus marmorosus =

Scientific classification
- Kingdom: Animalia
- Phylum: Arthropoda
- Clade: Pancrustacea
- Class: Insecta
- Order: Coleoptera
- Suborder: Polyphaga
- Infraorder: Cucujiformia
- Family: Coccinellidae
- Genus: Diomus
- Species: D. marmorosus

Binomial name
- Diomus marmorosus Pang & Slipinski, 2009

Species of beetle

Diomus marmorosus is a species of beetle of the family Coccinellidae. It is found in Australia (Queensland, Northern Territory).

== Description ==
Adults reach a length of about 1.6–2.1 mm (0.063–0.083 in). The head, most of the pronotum and six spots on each elytron are marble white. There is a dark area on the pronotum. The dorsal surface is covered by silvery pubescence.

== Etymology ==
The species name is derived from Latin marmor and refers to the marble like spots on the elytra and pronotum.
