= Diomus reidi =

Scientific classification
- Kingdom: Animalia
- Phylum: Arthropoda
- Clade: Pancrustacea
- Class: Insecta
- Order: Coleoptera
- Suborder: Polyphaga
- Infraorder: Cucujiformia
- Family: Coccinellidae
- Genus: Diomus
- Species: D. reidi

Binomial name
- Diomus reidi Pang & Slipinski, 2009

Species of beetle

Diomus reidi is a species of beetle of the family Coccinellidae. It is found in Australia (Western Australia).

== Description ==
Adults reach a length of about 1.5–2 mm (0.059–0.079 in). The head and anterior part of the pronotum are yellowish or orange. The rest of the pronotum and elytra are dark brown to black. The antennae and legs are yellowish brown. The dorsal surface is covered by silvery pubescence, forming wavy patterns.

== Etymology ==
The species is named after Dr. Chris Reid, who collected the holotype.
