= Diomus panamensis =

Scientific classification
- Kingdom: Animalia
- Phylum: Arthropoda
- Clade: Pancrustacea
- Class: Insecta
- Order: Coleoptera
- Suborder: Polyphaga
- Infraorder: Cucujiformia
- Family: Coccinellidae
- Genus: Diomus
- Species: D. panamensis

Binomial name
- Diomus panamensis González & Větrovec, 2021

Species of beetle

Diomus panamensis is a species of beetle of the family Coccinellidae. It is found in Panama (Chiriquí).

== Description ==
Adults reach a length of about 2.4–2.6 mm (0.094–0.102 in). The head and antennae are yellow and the pronotum is yellow with five light brown spots. The scutellum is black and the elytra are brown with black borders. The ventral surface is mostly black, the abdomen is brown and the legs are mostly yellow. The pubescence is yellow.

== Etymology ==
The species is named after Panama, the country where the known specimens of the species were collected.
