= Decadiomus bahamicus =

Scientific classification
- Kingdom: Animalia
- Phylum: Arthropoda
- Class: Insecta
- Order: Coleoptera
- Suborder: Polyphaga
- Infraorder: Cucujiformia
- Family: Coccinellidae
- Genus: Decadiomus
- Species: D. bahamicus

Binomial name
- Decadiomus bahamicus (Casey, 1899)

Species of beetle

Decadiomus bahamicus is a species of lady beetle in the family Coccinellidae. It is found in the Caribbean and Southern Florida.
