= Diomus macrops =

Scientific classification
- Kingdom: Animalia
- Phylum: Arthropoda
- Clade: Pancrustacea
- Class: Insecta
- Order: Coleoptera
- Suborder: Polyphaga
- Infraorder: Cucujiformia
- Family: Coccinellidae
- Genus: Diomus
- Species: D. macrops

Binomial name
- Diomus macrops (Lea, 1929)

Synonyms
- Scymnus macrops Lea, 1929

Species of beetle

Diomus macrops is a species of beetle of the family Coccinellidae. It is found in Australia (Lord Howe Island).

== Description ==
Adults reach a length of about 1.9 mm (0.075 in). The head, antennae and legs are yellowish brown, while the pronotum and elytra are dark brown. The dorsal surface is shiny and covered by whitish pubescence, forming a slightly wavy pattern on the elytra.
