= Diomus sphragitis =

Scientific classification
- Kingdom: Animalia
- Phylum: Arthropoda
- Clade: Pancrustacea
- Class: Insecta
- Order: Coleoptera
- Suborder: Polyphaga
- Infraorder: Cucujiformia
- Family: Coccinellidae
- Genus: Diomus
- Species: D. sphragitis

Binomial name
- Diomus sphragitis (Weise, 1885)

Synonyms
- Scymnus sphragitis Weise, 1885; Scymnus meyricki Blackburn, 1889; Scymnus meyricki obscuripes Blackburn, 1889; Scymnus trilobus Lea, 1902; Scymnus indistinctus Lea, 1902

Species of beetle

Diomus sphragitis is a species of beetle of the family Coccinellidae. It is found in southern Australia.

== Description ==
Adults reach a length of about 2.4–2.8 mm (0.094–0.110 in). The head and anterior angles of the pronotum are yellowish or orange, while the rest of the pronotum and elytra are dark brown to black, the latter with a red or orange pre-apical spot. The antennae and legs are yellowish-brown. The dorsal surface is covered by silvery pubescence, forming vague wavy patterns.
