= Diomus torres =

Scientific classification
- Kingdom: Animalia
- Phylum: Arthropoda
- Clade: Pancrustacea
- Class: Insecta
- Order: Coleoptera
- Suborder: Polyphaga
- Infraorder: Cucujiformia
- Family: Coccinellidae
- Genus: Diomus
- Species: D. torres

Binomial name
- Diomus torres Pang & Slipinski, 2009

Species of beetle

Diomus torres is a species of beetle of the family Coccinellidae. It is found in Australia (Queensland: Horn Island and Murray Island).

== Description ==
Adults reach a length of about 1.5–1.8 mm (0.059–0.071 in). The head, pronotum and most of the elytra are yellowish, with the elytral base and subapical transverse markings black. The antennae and legs are yellowish or brown. The dorsal surface is covered by whitish pubescence.

== Etymology ==
The species name referring to its type locality, the Torres Strait islands.
