= Diomus elutus =

Scientific classification
- Kingdom: Animalia
- Phylum: Arthropoda
- Clade: Pancrustacea
- Class: Insecta
- Order: Coleoptera
- Suborder: Polyphaga
- Infraorder: Cucujiformia
- Family: Coccinellidae
- Genus: Diomus
- Species: D. elutus

Binomial name
- Diomus elutus (Lea, 1902)

Synonyms
- Scymnus elutus Lea, 1902

Species of beetle

Diomus elutus is a species of beetle of the family Coccinellidae. It is found in Australia (New South Wales, Tasmania).

== Description ==
Adults reach a length of about 0.78–1.51 mm (0.031–0.059 in). The head, antennae, legs and most of the pronotum are yellowish brown, while the central part of the pronotum and elytra are dark brown. The dorsal surface is shiny and covered by yellowish pubescence.
