= Decadiomus hughesi =

Scientific classification
- Kingdom: Animalia
- Phylum: Arthropoda
- Clade: Pancrustacea
- Class: Insecta
- Order: Coleoptera
- Suborder: Polyphaga
- Infraorder: Cucujiformia
- Family: Coccinellidae
- Genus: Decadiomus
- Species: D. hughesi

Binomial name
- Decadiomus hughesi Gordon & Hilburn, 1990

Species of beetle

Decadiomus hughesi is a species of beetle of the family Coccinellidae. It was described from Bermuda, but is probably an introduced species.

== Description ==
Adults reach a length of about 1.15–1.6 mm. Adults are black, although the pronotum is reddish yellow with a black basal spot. The basal, sutural and lateral margins of the elytron are black.

== Biology ==
They prey on mealybugs, including Pseudococcus longispinus, Icerya purchasi, Coccus viridis and Carulaspis minima.
