= Heterodiomus =

Scientific classification
- Kingdom: Animalia
- Phylum: Arthropoda
- Class: Insecta
- Order: Coleoptera
- Suborder: Polyphaga
- Infraorder: Cucujiformia
- Family: Coccinellidae
- Tribe: Diomini
- Genus: Heterodiomus; Brèthes, 1925

Genus of beetles

Heterodiomus is a genus of lady beetles in the family Coccinellidae.

== Species ==
- Heterodiomus apparitorius (Weise, 1922)
- Heterodiomus brethesi González & Gordon, 2003
- Heterodiomus canisius Gordon, 1999
- Heterodiomus celestine Gordon, 1999
- Heterodiomus darwini Brèthes, 1925
- Heterodiomus marchali (Brèthes, 1925)
