= Diomus ningning =

Scientific classification
- Kingdom: Animalia
- Phylum: Arthropoda
- Clade: Pancrustacea
- Class: Insecta
- Order: Coleoptera
- Suborder: Polyphaga
- Infraorder: Cucujiformia
- Family: Coccinellidae
- Genus: Diomus
- Species: D. ningning

Binomial name
- Diomus ningning Pang & Slipinski, 2009

Species of beetle

Diomus ningning is a species of beetle of the family Coccinellidae. It is found in Australia (South Australia, Western Australia).

== Description ==
Adults reach a length of about 1.7–2.1 mm (0.067–0.083 in). The head, pronotum and elytra are mostly black, but the frons is brown and the anterior pronotal angles and fasciae on the elytra are orange to red. The dorsal surface is covered with whitish pubescence, forming wavy patterns.

== Etymology ==
The species is named after the daughter of the senior author, Ningning Jian.
