= Diomus ementitor =

Scientific classification
- Kingdom: Animalia
- Phylum: Arthropoda
- Clade: Pancrustacea
- Class: Insecta
- Order: Coleoptera
- Suborder: Polyphaga
- Infraorder: Cucujiformia
- Family: Coccinellidae
- Genus: Diomus
- Species: D. ementitor

Binomial name
- Diomus ementitor (Blackburn, 1895)

Synonyms
- Scymnus ementitor Blackburn, 1895

Species of beetle

Diomus ementitor is a species of beetle of the family Coccinellidae. It is found in Australia (northern New South Wales, Queensland).

== Description ==
Adults reach a length of about 2.6–3.2 mm (0.10–0.13 in). The head and lateral areas of the pronotum are yellow, while the central part of the pronotum and elytra are black. The antennae and legs are yellowish or brown. The dorsal surface is covered by whitish pubescence.
