= Diomus carbine =

Scientific classification
- Kingdom: Animalia
- Phylum: Arthropoda
- Clade: Pancrustacea
- Class: Insecta
- Order: Coleoptera
- Suborder: Polyphaga
- Infraorder: Cucujiformia
- Family: Coccinellidae
- Genus: Diomus
- Species: D. carbine

Binomial name
- Diomus carbine Pang & Slipinski, 2010

Species of beetle

Diomus carbine is a species of beetle of the family Coccinellidae. It is found in Australia (northern Queensland).

== Description ==
Adults reach a length of about 0.9–1 mm (0.035–0.039 in). The frons, antennae, legs, anterior angles of the pronotum and abdomen are yellowish or orange, while most of the pronotum, elytra and venter are black. The dorsal surface is shiny and covered by silvery pubescence.

== Etymology ==
The species name is derived from its type locality, Mount Carbine in Queensland.
