= Diomus pumilio =

Scientific classification
- Kingdom: Animalia
- Phylum: Arthropoda
- Clade: Pancrustacea
- Class: Insecta
- Order: Coleoptera
- Suborder: Polyphaga
- Infraorder: Cucujiformia
- Family: Coccinellidae
- Genus: Diomus
- Species: D. pumilio

Binomial name
- Diomus pumilio (Weise, 1885)

Synonyms
- Scymnus (Diomus) pumilio Weise, 1885; Scymnus flavifrons Blackburn, 1889; Scymnus flavifrons var. occidentalis Blackburn, 1889; Scymnus flavifrons var. victoriae Blackburn, 1889

Species of beetle

Diomus pumilio is a species of ladybird. Its common name is longblack ladybird. It is found in North America, Oceania and Australia. The species is originally from Australia, but has been imported several times into the United States and Canada.

== Description ==
Adults reach a length of about 1.35-1.60 mm. They have a black body. Males have the anterior pronotal margin, head, propleuron, mouthparts and anterior leg reddish yellow.
