= Diomus cucullifer =

Scientific classification
- Kingdom: Animalia
- Phylum: Arthropoda
- Clade: Pancrustacea
- Class: Insecta
- Order: Coleoptera
- Suborder: Polyphaga
- Infraorder: Cucujiformia
- Family: Coccinellidae
- Genus: Diomus
- Species: D. cucullifer

Binomial name
- Diomus cucullifer (Blackburn, 1892)

Synonyms
- Scymnus cucullifer Blackburn, 1892

Species of beetle

Diomus cucullifer is a species of beetle of the family Coccinellidae. It is found in Australia (from the Australian Capital Territory. through central New South Wales to southern Queensland).

== Description ==
Adults reach a length of about 1.7–2.3 mm (0.067–0.091 in). The head, most of the pronotum and the C-shaped markings on the elytra are yellowish. The pronotum has a dark basal spot. The dorsal surface is covered by whitish pubescence.
