= Diomus lord =

Scientific classification
- Kingdom: Animalia
- Phylum: Arthropoda
- Clade: Pancrustacea
- Class: Insecta
- Order: Coleoptera
- Suborder: Polyphaga
- Infraorder: Cucujiformia
- Family: Coccinellidae
- Genus: Diomus
- Species: D. lord

Binomial name
- Diomus lord Pang & Slipinski, 2010

Species of beetle

Diomus lord is a species of beetle of the family Coccinellidae. It is found in Australia (Norfolk Island).

== Description ==
Adults reach a length of about 0.9–1 mm (0.035–0.039 in). The head, antennae, legs and anterior angles of the pronotum are yellowish, while the rest of the pronotum and elytra are black. The dorsal surface is shiny and covered by silvery pubescence, forming a wavy pattern on the elytra.

== Etymology ==
The species name is an arbitrary combination of letters.
