= Diomus gingera =

Scientific classification
- Kingdom: Animalia
- Phylum: Arthropoda
- Clade: Pancrustacea
- Class: Insecta
- Order: Coleoptera
- Suborder: Polyphaga
- Infraorder: Cucujiformia
- Family: Coccinellidae
- Genus: Diomus
- Species: D. gingera

Binomial name
- Diomus gingera Pang & Slipinski, 2010

Species of beetle

Diomus gingera is a species of beetle of the family Coccinellidae. It is found in Australia (Australian Capital Territory, southern New South Wales).

== Description ==
Adults reach a length of about 1.3–1.4 mm (0.051–0.055 in). They have a brown to dark brown body with the head, pronotum, antennae and legs yellowish. The dorsal surface has very short hairs on the lateral parts of the pronotum and elytra.

== Etymology ==
The species name is derived from its type locality, Mount Gingera in the Australian Capital Territory.
