= Diomus zborowskii =

Scientific classification
- Kingdom: Animalia
- Phylum: Arthropoda
- Clade: Pancrustacea
- Class: Insecta
- Order: Coleoptera
- Suborder: Polyphaga
- Infraorder: Cucujiformia
- Family: Coccinellidae
- Genus: Diomus
- Species: D. zborowskii

Binomial name
- Diomus zborowskii Pang & Slipinski, 2009

Species of beetle

Diomus zborowskii is a species of beetle of the family Coccinellidae. It is found in Australia (northern Queensland).

== Description ==
Adults reach a length of about 1.5–2.2 mm (0.059–0.087 in). The head, lateral areas of the pronotum and large spots on the elytra are yellowish, while the central part of the pronotum at the base and the rest of the elytra are black. The antennae and legs are yellowish or brown. The dorsal surface is covered by whitish pubescence.

== Etymology ==
The species is dedicated to the insect photographer Pawel (Paul) Zborowski.
