= Diomus texanus =

Scientific classification
- Kingdom: Animalia
- Phylum: Arthropoda
- Class: Insecta
- Order: Coleoptera
- Suborder: Polyphaga
- Infraorder: Cucujiformia
- Family: Coccinellidae
- Genus: Diomus
- Species: D. texanus

Binomial name
- Diomus texanus Gordon, 1976

Species of beetle

Diomus texanus is a species of lady beetle in the family Coccinellidae. It is found in North America.
