= Diomus prodigialis =

Scientific classification
- Kingdom: Animalia
- Phylum: Arthropoda
- Clade: Pancrustacea
- Class: Insecta
- Order: Coleoptera
- Suborder: Polyphaga
- Infraorder: Cucujiformia
- Family: Coccinellidae
- Genus: Diomus
- Species: D. prodigialis

Binomial name
- Diomus prodigialis Pang & Slipinski, 2010

Species of beetle

Diomus prodigialis is a species of beetle of the family Coccinellidae. It is found in Australia (South Australia).

== Description ==
Adults reach a length of about 1–1.5 mm (0.039–0.059 in). The body is dark brown to black with the head, anterior corners of the pronotum, antennae and legs yellowish. The dorsal surface is glabrous and shiny.

== Etymology ==
The species name is derived from Latin prodigialis (meaning strange) and refers to its apparently glabrous, shiny body and unusual shape of a tegmen in the male genitalia.
