= Diomus capital =

Scientific classification
- Kingdom: Animalia
- Phylum: Arthropoda
- Clade: Pancrustacea
- Class: Insecta
- Order: Coleoptera
- Suborder: Polyphaga
- Infraorder: Cucujiformia
- Family: Coccinellidae
- Genus: Diomus
- Species: D. capital

Binomial name
- Diomus capital Pang & Slipinski, 2009

Species of beetle

Diomus capital is a species of beetle of the family Coccinellidae. It is found in Australia (Australian Capital Territory).

== Description ==
Adults reach a length of about 1.5–1.8 mm (0.059–0.071 in). The head and anterior margin of the pronotum are orange, while the rest of the pronotum and elytra are dark brown to black, the latter usually with a reddish pattern. The dorsal surface is covered by silvery pubescence.

== Etymology ==
The species name refers to its type locality in Canberra, the capital city of Australia.
