= Diomus maestus =

Scientific classification
- Kingdom: Animalia
- Phylum: Arthropoda
- Clade: Pancrustacea
- Class: Insecta
- Order: Coleoptera
- Suborder: Polyphaga
- Infraorder: Cucujiformia
- Family: Coccinellidae
- Genus: Diomus
- Species: D. maestus

Binomial name
- Diomus maestus (Lea, 1926)

Synonyms
- Scymnus maestus Lea, 1926

Species of beetle

Diomus maestus is a species of beetle of the family Coccinellidae. It is found in Australia (Tasmania).

== Description ==
Adults reach a length of about 1.4–1.5 mm (0.055–0.059 in). The body is brown to dark brown with the elytra usually slightly lighter than the pronotum. The anterior corner of the latter is yellowish. The dorsal surface is covered by whitish pubescence, forming wavy patterns on the elytra.
