= Diomus triangularis =

Scientific classification
- Kingdom: Animalia
- Phylum: Arthropoda
- Clade: Pancrustacea
- Class: Insecta
- Order: Coleoptera
- Suborder: Polyphaga
- Infraorder: Cucujiformia
- Family: Coccinellidae
- Genus: Diomus
- Species: D. triangularis

Binomial name
- Diomus triangularis (Lea, 1902)

Synonyms
- Scymnus triangularis Lea, 1902

Species of beetle

Diomus triangularis is a species of beetle of the family Coccinellidae. It is found in Australia (New South Wales, South Australia).

== Description ==
Adults reach a length of about 1.1–1.2 mm (0.043–0.047 in). The head, antennae, legs, most of the pronotum and lateral parts of the elytra are yellowish brown, while the central part of the pronotum and a large triangular marking on the elytra are dark brown. The dorsal surface is shiny and has short setae.
