= Diomus akonis =

Scientific classification
- Kingdom: Animalia
- Phylum: Arthropoda
- Clade: Pancrustacea
- Class: Insecta
- Order: Coleoptera
- Suborder: Polyphaga
- Infraorder: Cucujiformia
- Family: Coccinellidae
- Genus: Diomus
- Species: D. akonis

Binomial name
- Diomus akonis (Ohta, 1929)

Synonyms
- Pullus akonis Ohta, 1929; Diomus brachysiphonicus Pang & Huang, 1985; Diomus brunsuturalis Pang & Gordon, 1986

Species of beetle

Diomus akonis is a species of beetle of the family Coccinellidae. It is found in Taiwan and China (Fujian, Hainan).

== Description ==
Adults reach a length of about 1.35 mm. Adults have a yellow head and pronotum and the elytron is yellow with a dark brown sutural spot.
