= Heterodiomus marchali =

Scientific classification
- Kingdom: Animalia
- Phylum: Arthropoda
- Class: Insecta
- Order: Coleoptera
- Suborder: Polyphaga
- Infraorder: Cucujiformia
- Family: Coccinellidae
- Genus: Heterodiomus
- Species: H. marchali

Binomial name
- Heterodiomus marchali (Brèthes, 1925)

Synonyms
- Diomus marchali Brèthes, 1925

Species of beetle

Heterodiomus marchali is a species of beetle of the family Coccinellidae. It is found in Chile.
