= Diomus australis =

Scientific classification
- Kingdom: Animalia
- Phylum: Arthropoda
- Clade: Pancrustacea
- Class: Insecta
- Order: Coleoptera
- Suborder: Polyphaga
- Infraorder: Cucujiformia
- Family: Coccinellidae
- Genus: Diomus
- Species: D. australis

Binomial name
- Diomus australis (Blackburn, 1889)

Synonyms
- Scymnus australis Blackburn, 1889

Species of beetle

Diomus australis is a species of beetle of the family Coccinellidae. It is found in Australia (Victoria, South Australia).

== Description ==
Adults reach a length of about 2–2.2 mm (0.079–0.087 in). They are yellowish brown to dark brown with the head slightly lighter than the pronotum and a darker spot on each elytron. The dorsal surface is covered by short silvery pubescence.
