= Heterodiomus brethesi =

Scientific classification
- Kingdom: Animalia
- Phylum: Arthropoda
- Class: Insecta
- Order: Coleoptera
- Suborder: Polyphaga
- Infraorder: Cucujiformia
- Family: Coccinellidae
- Genus: Heterodiomus
- Species: H. brethesi

Binomial name
- Heterodiomus brethesi González & Gordon, 2003

Species of beetle

Heterodiomus brethesi is a species of beetle of the family Coccinellidae. It is found in Chile.

== Description ==
Adults reach a length of about 1.4–1.5 mm. Adults are pale reddish yellow, with the scutellar area of the elytron obscurely darkened.

== Etymology ==
The species is named for Jean Brèthes, the author of Heterodiomus and a significant figure in the classification of South American Coccinellidae.
