= Diomus storeyi =

Scientific classification
- Kingdom: Animalia
- Phylum: Arthropoda
- Clade: Pancrustacea
- Class: Insecta
- Order: Coleoptera
- Suborder: Polyphaga
- Infraorder: Cucujiformia
- Family: Coccinellidae
- Genus: Diomus
- Species: D. storeyi

Binomial name
- Diomus storeyi Pang & Slipinski, 2009

Species of beetle

Diomus storeyi is a species of beetle of the family Coccinellidae. It is found in Australia (northern Queensland).

== Description ==
Adults reach a length of about 1.5–1.8 mm (0.059–0.071 in). The head is yellowish brown, while the pronotum and elytra are brown to dark brown with black elytral suture. The pronotum is usually darker than the elytra and has yellowish brown anterior corners. The dorsal surface is covered by silvery pubescence, forming wavy patterns.

== Etymology ==
The species is dedicated to Dr. Ross Storey of the Queensland Department of Primary Industries, Mareeba.
