= Diomus mareebensis =

Scientific classification
- Kingdom: Animalia
- Phylum: Arthropoda
- Clade: Pancrustacea
- Class: Insecta
- Order: Coleoptera
- Suborder: Polyphaga
- Infraorder: Cucujiformia
- Family: Coccinellidae
- Genus: Diomus
- Species: D. mareebensis

Binomial name
- Diomus mareebensis (Blackburn, 1895)

Synonyms
- Scymnus mareebensis Blackburn, 1895; Diomus hypocritus Weise, 1923

Species of beetle

Diomus mareebensis is a species of beetle of the family Coccinellidae. It is found in Australia (northern Queensland).

== Description ==
Adults reach a length of about 1.7–1.8 mm (0.067–0.071 in). The head, antennae, legs, pronotum and abdomen are yellowish, while a medio-basal spot on the pronotum and elytra are black. The dorsal surface is shiny and covered by silvery pubescence.
