= Diomus flavolaterus =

Scientific classification
- Kingdom: Animalia
- Phylum: Arthropoda
- Clade: Pancrustacea
- Class: Insecta
- Order: Coleoptera
- Suborder: Polyphaga
- Infraorder: Cucujiformia
- Family: Coccinellidae
- Genus: Diomus
- Species: D. flavolaterus

Binomial name
- Diomus flavolaterus (Lea, 1926)

Synonyms
- Scymnus flavolaterus Lea, 1926

Species of beetle

Diomus flavolaterus is a species of beetle of the family Coccinellidae. It is found in Australia (Tasmania).

== Description ==
Adults reach a length of about 2.1–2.2 mm (0.083–0.087 in). The head and anterior angles of the pronotum are orange, while the elytra are dark brown to black. The dorsal surface is covered by whitish pubescence.
