= Diomini =

Scientific classification
- Kingdom: Animalia
- Phylum: Arthropoda
- Class: Insecta
- Order: Coleoptera
- Suborder: Polyphaga
- Infraorder: Cucujiformia
- Family: Coccinellidae
- Subfamily: Coccinellinae
- Tribe: Diomini; Gordon, 1999

Tribe of beetles

The Diomini are a tribe of insects within the family Coccinellidae.

== Genera ==
- Andrzej
- Decadiomus
- Dichaina
- Diomus
- Heterodiomus
- Moiradiomus
