= Diomus ancorus =

Scientific classification
- Kingdom: Animalia
- Phylum: Arthropoda
- Clade: Pancrustacea
- Class: Insecta
- Order: Coleoptera
- Suborder: Polyphaga
- Infraorder: Cucujiformia
- Family: Coccinellidae
- Genus: Diomus
- Species: D. ancorus

Binomial name
- Diomus ancorus Pang & Slipinski, 2009

Species of beetle

Diomus ancorus is a species of beetle of the family Coccinellidae. It is found in Australia (northern Queensland, Northern Territory).

== Description ==
Adults reach a length of about 1.9–2.3 mm (0.075–0.091 in). The head and pronotum are yellow or orange, while the elytra are dark brown to black, with two yellowish bands. The dorsal surface is covered by silvery pubescence.

== Etymology ==
The species name is derived from Latin ancora and refers to a dark anchor-shaped elytral pattern in the typical form.
