= Diomus victoriensis =

Scientific classification
- Kingdom: Animalia
- Phylum: Arthropoda
- Clade: Pancrustacea
- Class: Insecta
- Order: Coleoptera
- Suborder: Polyphaga
- Infraorder: Cucujiformia
- Family: Coccinellidae
- Genus: Diomus
- Species: D. victoriensis

Binomial name
- Diomus victoriensis (Blackburn, 1892)

Synonyms
- Scymnus victoriensis Blackburn, 1892

Species of beetle

Diomus victoriensis is a species of beetle of the family Coccinellidae. It is found in Australia (Victoria, Tasmania).

== Description ==
Adults reach a length of about 2.9–3 mm (0.11–0.12 in). The head, antennae, legs and pronotum are orange or brown, the pronotum with a black median triangular area. The elytra are dark brown or black with the apices somewhat lighter. The dorsal surface is shiny and covered by whitish pubescence, forming wavy patterns.
