= Diomus hebes =

Scientific classification
- Kingdom: Animalia
- Phylum: Arthropoda
- Clade: Pancrustacea
- Class: Insecta
- Order: Coleoptera
- Suborder: Polyphaga
- Infraorder: Cucujiformia
- Family: Coccinellidae
- Genus: Diomus
- Species: D. hebes

Binomial name
- Diomus hebes Pang & Slipinski, 2010

Species of beetle

Diomus hebes is a species of beetle of the family Coccinellidae. It is found in Australia (Australian Capital Territory).

== Description ==
Adults reach a length of about 1.1–2 mm (0.043–0.079 in). The head, antennae, legs, pronotum and abdomen are light brown, while the elytra are often darker along the suture and laterally. The dorsal surface is shiny and covered by silvery pubescence.

== Etymology ==
The species name is derived from Latin hebes (meaning blunt, non-interesting) and refers to a plain not very attractive body of the species.
