= Diomus kioloa =

Scientific classification
- Kingdom: Animalia
- Phylum: Arthropoda
- Clade: Pancrustacea
- Class: Insecta
- Order: Coleoptera
- Suborder: Polyphaga
- Infraorder: Cucujiformia
- Family: Coccinellidae
- Genus: Diomus
- Species: D. kioloa

Binomial name
- Diomus kioloa Pang & Slipinski, 2010

Species of beetle

Diomus kioloa is a species of beetle of the family Coccinellidae. It is found in Australia (New South Wales).

== Description ==
Adults reach a length of about 2.2–2.5 mm (0.087–0.098 in). The head, antennae, legs and pronotum are orange or brown, the latter with a black median area. The elytra are dark brown or black with the apices a bit lighter. The dorsal surface is covered by whitish pubescence, forming wavy patterns.

== Etymology ==
The species is named after the type locality, the Kioloa state forest in New South Wales.
