= Diomus sedani =

Scientific classification
- Kingdom: Animalia
- Phylum: Arthropoda
- Clade: Pancrustacea
- Class: Insecta
- Order: Coleoptera
- Suborder: Polyphaga
- Infraorder: Cucujiformia
- Family: Coccinellidae
- Genus: Diomus
- Species: D. sedani

Binomial name
- Diomus sedani (Blackburn, 1889)

Synonyms
- Scymnus sedani Blackburn, 1889

Species of beetle

Diomus sedani is a species of beetle of the family Coccinellidae. It is found in Australia (South Australia, Victoria).

== Description ==
Adults reach a length of about 2.8 mm (0.11 in). The head, pronotum and elytra are mostly black, the latter with a large orange fascia. The dorsal surface is covered with whitish pubescence, forming wavy patterns.
