= Diomus frater =

Scientific classification
- Kingdom: Animalia
- Phylum: Arthropoda
- Clade: Pancrustacea
- Class: Insecta
- Order: Coleoptera
- Suborder: Polyphaga
- Infraorder: Cucujiformia
- Family: Coccinellidae
- Genus: Diomus
- Species: D. frater

Binomial name
- Diomus frater (Lea, 1902)

Synonyms
- Scymnus frater Lea, 1902

Species of beetle

Diomus frater is a species of beetle of the family Coccinellidae. It is found in Australia (New South Wales, Australian Capital Territory).

== Description ==
Adults reach a length of about 2.3–2.5 mm (0.091–0.098 in). The body is black, except the central part of the head, antennae, legs and anterior corners of the pronotum, which are all orange brown. The dorsal surface is covered by whitish pubescence.
