= Diomus scapularis =

Scientific classification
- Kingdom: Animalia
- Phylum: Arthropoda
- Clade: Pancrustacea
- Class: Insecta
- Order: Coleoptera
- Suborder: Polyphaga
- Infraorder: Cucujiformia
- Family: Coccinellidae
- Genus: Diomus
- Species: D. scapularis

Binomial name
- Diomus scapularis (Weise, 1885)

Synonyms
- Scymnus (Diomus) scapularis Weise, 1885; Scymnus aurugineus Blackburn, 1889

Species of beetle

Diomus scapularis is a species of beetle of the family Coccinellidae. It is found in southern Australia.

== Description ==
Adults reach a length of about 1.82–2.17 mm (0.072–0.085 in). They are variable in colour, mostly with the entire body brown with a yellowish head, and the elytra with a yellowish marking with a black posterior border. Other specimens have reddish brown to almost black elytra, with the pattern hardly visible. The dorsal surface is covered by silvery pubescence, forming distinct patterns.
