= Diomus whittonensis =

Scientific classification
- Kingdom: Animalia
- Phylum: Arthropoda
- Clade: Pancrustacea
- Class: Insecta
- Order: Coleoptera
- Suborder: Polyphaga
- Infraorder: Cucujiformia
- Family: Coccinellidae
- Genus: Diomus
- Species: D. whittonensis

Binomial name
- Diomus whittonensis (Blackburn, 1892)

Synonyms
- Scymnus whittonensis Blackburn, 1892

Species of beetle

Diomus whittonensis is a species of beetle of the family Coccinellidae. It is found in Australia (New South Wales).

== Description ==
Adults reach a length of about 2.1–2.2 mm (0.083–0.087 in). The head, antennae and legs are yellow, while the pronotum is black with the anterior and lateral bands yellow. The elytra are black. The dorsal surface is shiny and covered by yellowish pubescence.
