= Diomus impictus =

Scientific classification
- Kingdom: Animalia
- Phylum: Arthropoda
- Clade: Pancrustacea
- Class: Insecta
- Order: Coleoptera
- Suborder: Polyphaga
- Infraorder: Cucujiformia
- Family: Coccinellidae
- Genus: Diomus
- Species: D. impictus

Binomial name
- Diomus impictus (Blackburn, 1895)

Synonyms
- Scymnus impictus Blackburn, 1895

Species of beetle

Diomus impictus is a species of beetle of the family Coccinellidae. It is found in Australia (Australian Capital Territory, New South Wales).

== Description ==
Adults reach a length of about 1.7–2 mm (0.067–0.079 in). They are brown to dark brown with the head slightly lighter than the pronotum. The dorsal surface is shiny and covered by yellowish pubescence.
