= Decadiomus =

Scientific classification
- Kingdom: Animalia
- Phylum: Arthropoda
- Class: Insecta
- Order: Coleoptera
- Suborder: Polyphaga
- Infraorder: Cucujiformia
- Family: Coccinellidae
- Tribe: Diomini
- Genus: Decadiomus; Chapin, 1933

Genus of beetles

Decadiomus is a genus of lady beetles in the family Coccinellidae. There are about six described species in Decadiomus. They are found primarily in the Caribbean, but Decadiomus bahamicus is also found in southern Florida.

== Species ==
These species belong to the genus Decadiomus:

- Decadiomus amabilis
- Decadiomus austrinus
- Decadiomus bahamicus (Casey, 1899)
- Decadiomus balteatus
- Decadiomus bigemmeus
- Decadiomus floridanus
- Decadiomus hayuyai
- Decadiomus hubbardi
- Decadiomus hughesi
- Decadiomus humilis
- Decadiomus liebecki
- Decadiomus martorelli
- Decadiomus myrmidon
- Decadiomus peltatus
- Decadiomus pictus
- Decadiomus pseudotaedatus
- Decadiomus ramosi
- Decadiomus taedatus
- Decadiomus tricuspis
