= Microcaria =

Scientific classification
- Kingdom: Animalia
- Phylum: Arthropoda
- Clade: Pancrustacea
- Class: Insecta
- Order: Coleoptera
- Suborder: Polyphaga
- Infraorder: Cucujiformia
- Family: Coccinellidae
- Subfamily: Coccinellinae
- Tribe: Coccinellini
- Genus: Microcaria; Crotch, 1871

Synonyms
- Bothrocalvia Crotch, 1874

Genus of beetles

Microcaria is a genus of beetles belonging to the family Coccinellidae.

== Species ==
- Microcaria albolineata
- Microcaria decemsignata
- Microcaria jansoni
- Microcaria lewisii
- Microcaria mulsanti
- Microcaria pupillata
- Microcaria salomonensis
- Microcaria versipellis
- Microcaria vivida

== Selected former species ==
- Microcaria circinatella
