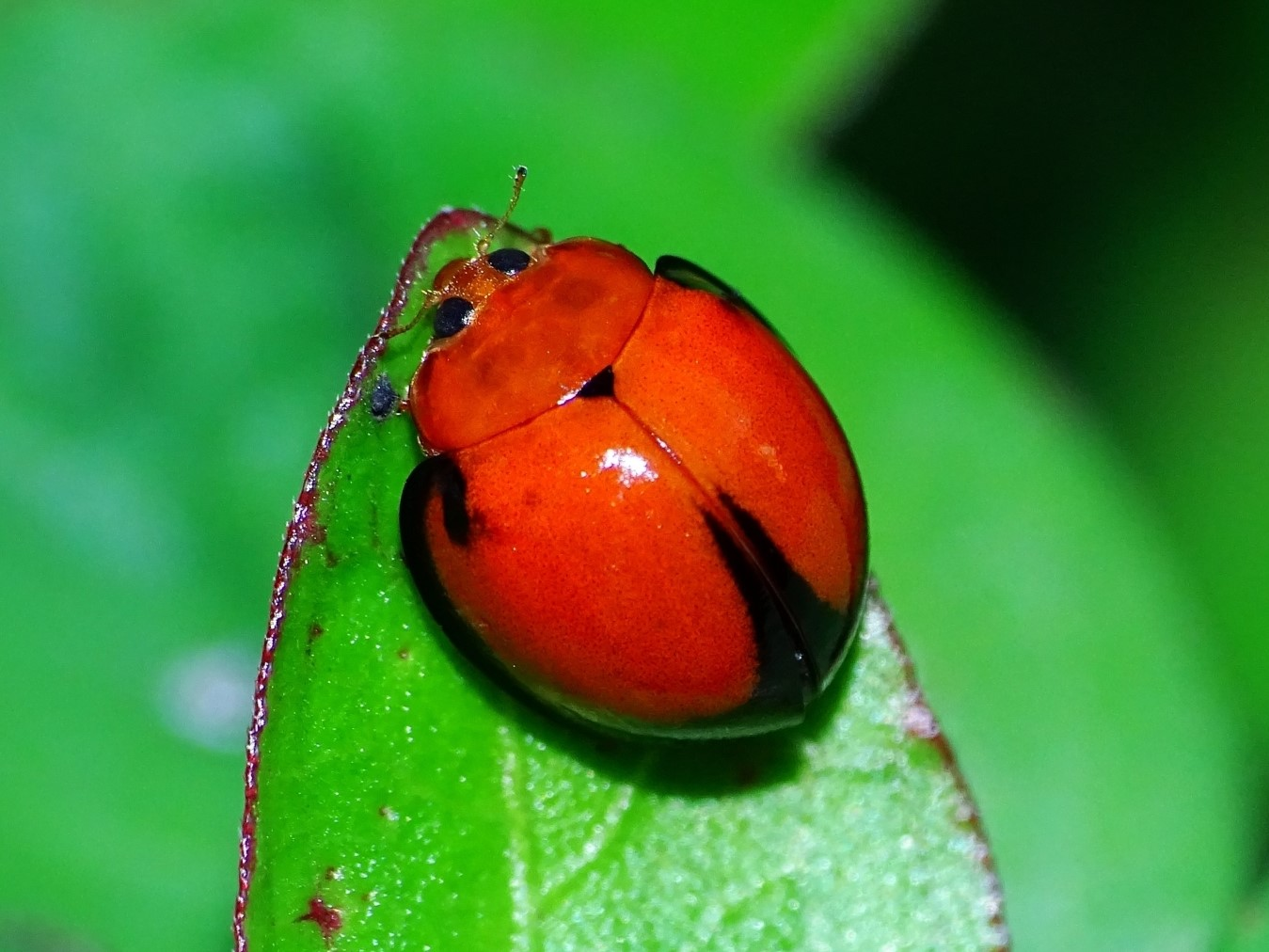

Scientific classification
- Kingdom: Animalia
- Phylum: Arthropoda
- Clade: Pancrustacea
- Class: Insecta
- Order: Coleoptera
- Suborder: Polyphaga
- Infraorder: Cucujiformia
- Family: Coccinellidae
- Genus: Phrynocaria
- Species: P. perfida

Binomial name
- Phrynocaria perfida Poorani, 2021

= Phrynocaria perfida =

Species of beetle

Phrynocaria perfida is a species of beetle of the family Coccinellidae. It is found in India (Tamil Nadu, Karnataka, Kerala).

== Description ==
Adults reach a length of about 3.63–4.1 mm (0.143–0.161 in). The dorsal surface is yellowish-orange to reddish and the scutellum is black. The pronotum may have a small black spot on posterior margin. The elytral pattern is variable and ranges from uniform reddish to orange or yellow, or with a black lateral margin, an elongate spot and a larger apical black patch, or even five black spots on each elytron.

== Etymology ==
The species name is derived from Latin perfida (meaning false) and refers to its external similarity to Phrynocaria circumusta.
