= Phrynocaria wallacii =

Scientific classification
- Kingdom: Animalia
- Phylum: Arthropoda
- Clade: Pancrustacea
- Class: Insecta
- Order: Coleoptera
- Suborder: Polyphaga
- Infraorder: Cucujiformia
- Family: Coccinellidae
- Genus: Phrynocaria
- Species: P. wallacii

Binomial name
- Phrynocaria wallacii (Crotch, 1874)

Synonyms
- Coelophora wallacii Crotch, 1874

Species of beetle

Phrynocaria wallacii is a species of beetle of the family Coccinellidae. It is found in Indonesia (North Maluku, Kai Islands).

== Description ==
Adults reach a length of about 5.8–6.3 mm (0.23–0.25 in). The head and pronotum are yellow or orange and the scutellum is orange with darker apical margins. The elytra are yellow or orange, with a black stripe along the suture and a wider lateral stripe.
