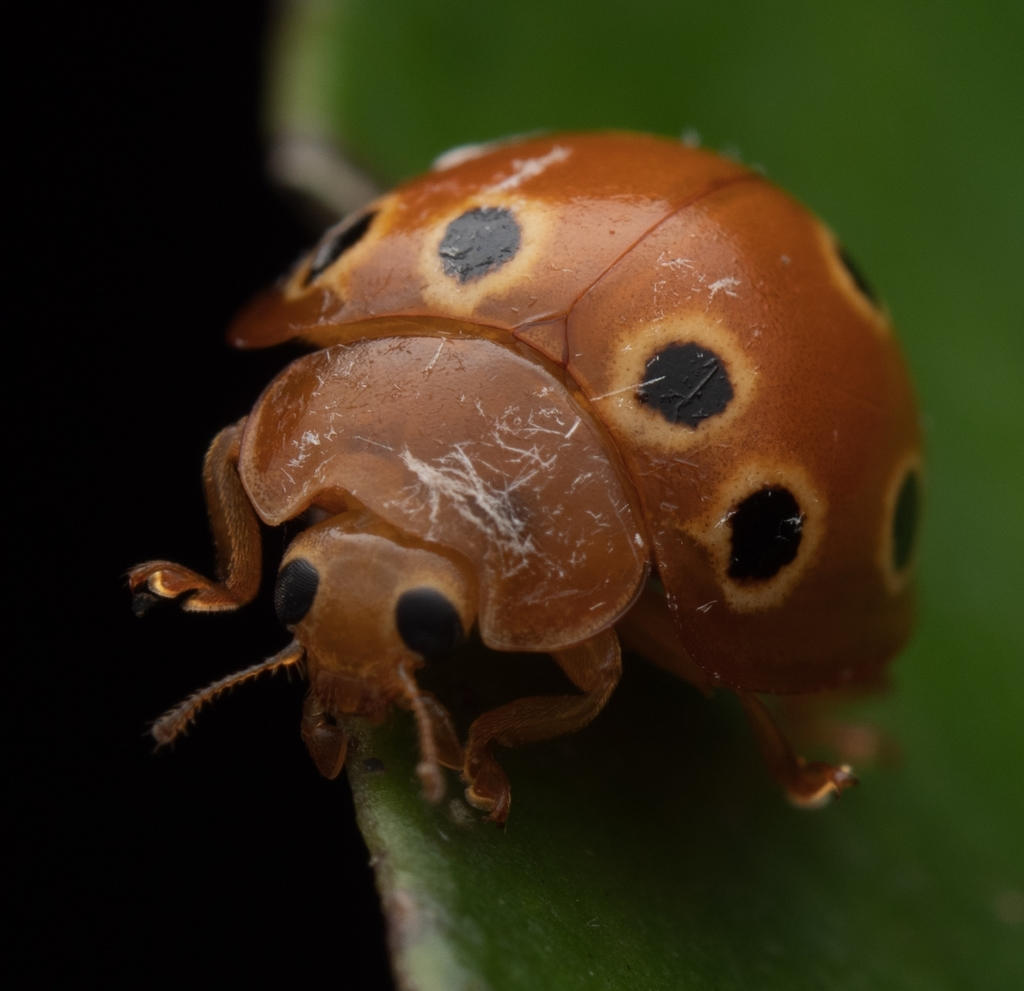

Scientific classification
- Kingdom: Animalia
- Phylum: Arthropoda
- Clade: Pancrustacea
- Class: Insecta
- Order: Coleoptera
- Suborder: Polyphaga
- Infraorder: Cucujiformia
- Family: Coccinellidae
- Genus: Microcaria
- Species: M. pupillata

Binomial name
- Microcaria pupillata (Swartz, 1808)

Synonyms
- Coccinella pupillata Swartz in Schönherr, 1808

= Microcaria pupillata =

Species of beetle

Microcaria pupillata, the eastern ten-spotted ladybug, is a species of beetle of the family Coccinellidae. It is found in India (West Bengal, South Andaman Island), Nepal, China, Indonesia and Thailand.

== Description ==
Adults reach a length of about 5.2–6 mm (0.20–0.24 in). They are reddish brown, the pronotum with dark and paler areas and each elytron with five black spots with yellowish halos.

== Life history ==
They have been recorded preying on Aphis citricidus.
