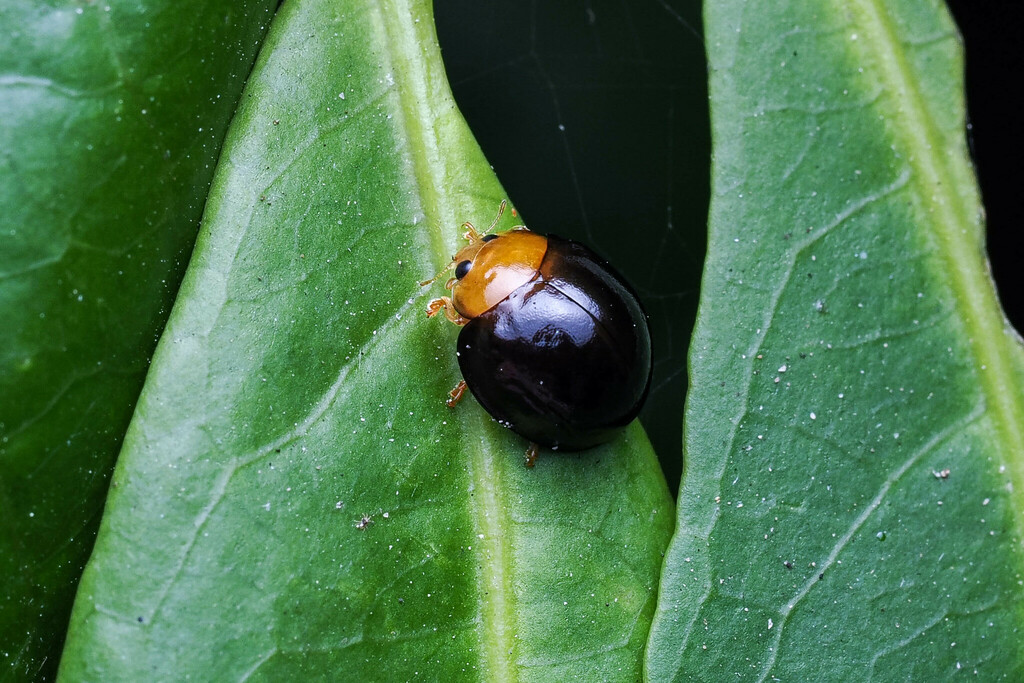

Scientific classification
- Kingdom: Animalia
- Phylum: Arthropoda
- Clade: Pancrustacea
- Class: Insecta
- Order: Coleoptera
- Suborder: Polyphaga
- Infraorder: Cucujiformia
- Family: Coccinellidae
- Genus: Microcaria
- Species: M. jansoni

Binomial name
- Microcaria jansoni (Crotch, 1874)

Synonyms
- Coelophora jansoni Crotch, 1874

= Microcaria jansoni =

Species of beetle

Microcaria jansoni is a species of beetle of the family Coccinellidae. It is found in Papua New Guinea, the Solomon Islands and Australia (northern Queensland).

== Description ==
Adults reach a length of about 5–6 mm (0.20–0.24 in). The head and antennae are light brown, while the pronotum is reddish and the scutellum reddish to black. The elytra are black with two reddish spots apically.
