= Phrynocaria ambonina =

Scientific classification
- Kingdom: Animalia
- Phylum: Arthropoda
- Clade: Pancrustacea
- Class: Insecta
- Order: Coleoptera
- Suborder: Polyphaga
- Infraorder: Cucujiformia
- Family: Coccinellidae
- Genus: Phrynocaria
- Species: P. ambonina

Binomial name
- Phrynocaria ambonina Ślipiński, Li & Pang, 2020

Species of beetle

Phrynocaria ambonina is a species of beetle of the family Coccinellidae. It is found in Indonesia (Ambon Island).

== Description ==
Adults reach a length of about 4–4.2 mm (0.16–0.17 in). The head and antennae are yellow in males, while females have a darker central patch on the frons. The pronotum is orange-yellow, with a central black patch and the scutellum is black. The elytra are black with two orange-yellow patches.
