= Phrynocaria georgia =

Scientific classification
- Kingdom: Animalia
- Phylum: Arthropoda
- Clade: Pancrustacea
- Class: Insecta
- Order: Coleoptera
- Suborder: Polyphaga
- Infraorder: Cucujiformia
- Family: Coccinellidae
- Genus: Phrynocaria
- Species: P. georgia

Binomial name
- Phrynocaria georgia Ślipiński, Li & Pang, 2020

Species of beetle

Phrynocaria georgia is a species of beetle of the family Coccinellidae. It is found on the Solomon Islands.

== Description ==
Adults reach a length of about 4.2–4.6 mm (0.17–0.18 in). The head and antennae are yellow in males, with a darker medial area in females. The pronotum is black in females, with a large yellow or orange lateral area in males. The scutellum and elytra are black, the latter with four reddish markings, and with the lateral borders and suture black.
