= Phrynocaria unicolor =

Scientific classification
- Kingdom: Animalia
- Phylum: Arthropoda
- Clade: Pancrustacea
- Class: Insecta
- Order: Coleoptera
- Suborder: Polyphaga
- Infraorder: Cucujiformia
- Family: Coccinellidae
- Genus: Phrynocaria
- Species: P. unicolor

Binomial name
- Phrynocaria unicolor (Fabricius, 1792)

Synonyms
- Coccinella unicolor Fabricius, 1792; Coelophora octosignata Mulsant, 1850; Coelophora caliginosa Mulsant, 1850; Coelophora dumortieri Mulsant, 1866; Coelophora dupasquieri Mulsant, 1866; Coelophora petrequini Mulsant, 1866; Coelophora romani Mulsant, 1866; Dysis saundersii Crotch, 1874; Coelophora mitis Weise, 1913; Coccinella congener Billberg, 1808; Coelophora approximans Crotch, 1874; Cheilomenes teretus Ohta, 1929; Lemnia consimilis Araki, 1962; Phrynocaria nigrilimbata Jing, 1986

Species of beetle

Phrynocaria unicolor is a species of beetle of the family Coccinellidae. It is found in India (Assam, Bihar, Delhi, Himachal Pradesh, Pondicherry, Jharkhand, Odisha, Uttar Pradesh, Andamans), China (Sichuan, Guizhou, Fujian, Hong Kong, Guangdong, Guangxi, Yunnan), Taiwan, Japan, Vietnam and Thailand.

== Description ==
Adults reach a length of about 3.42–4.62 mm (0.135–0.182 in). It is a highly variable species with many colour forms.

== Life history ==
They have been recorded preying on whiteflies (including Aleurolobus barodensis and Dialeuropora decempuncta), as well as Tuberculatus indicus and Schizoneuraphis himalayensis.
