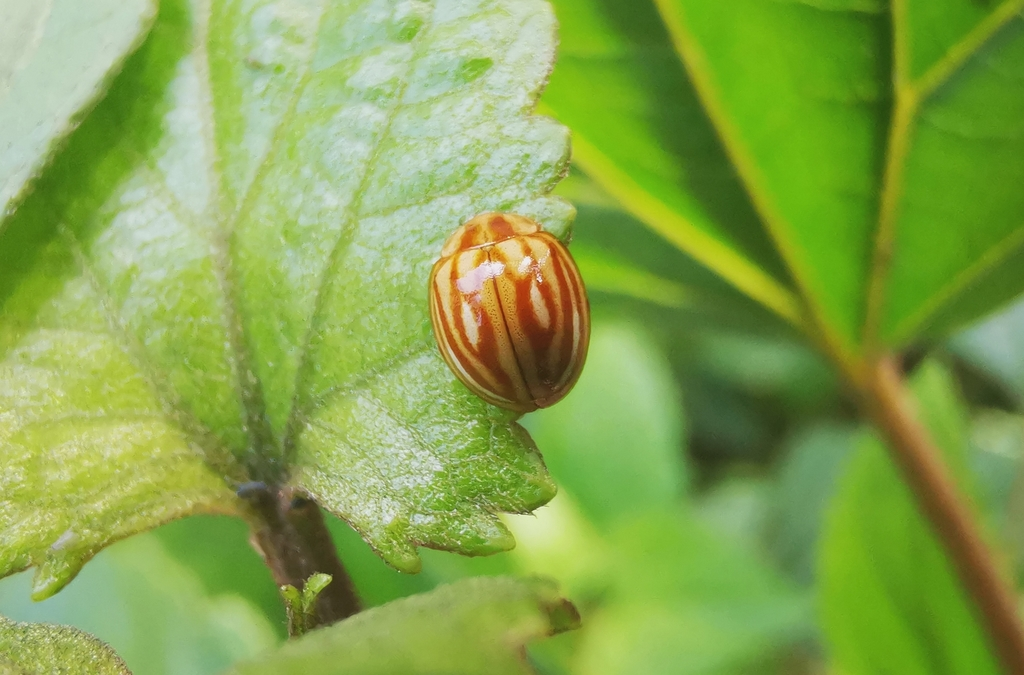

Scientific classification
- Kingdom: Animalia
- Phylum: Arthropoda
- Clade: Pancrustacea
- Class: Insecta
- Order: Coleoptera
- Suborder: Polyphaga
- Infraorder: Cucujiformia
- Family: Coccinellidae
- Genus: Microcaria
- Species: M. lewisii

Binomial name
- Microcaria lewisii (Crotch, 1874)

Synonyms
- Bothrocalvia lewisii Crotch, 1874

= Microcaria lewisii =

Species of beetle

Microcaria lewisii is a species of beetle of the family Coccinellidae. It is found in India (Manipur, Nagaland), Nepal, Bhutan and Myanmar.

== Description ==
Adults reach a length of about 5.8–6.5 mm (0.23–0.26 in). They are creamy whitish to yellowish. The pronotum has a reddish-brown marking in the shape of an M and the elytra have three reddish brown or ochreous stripes.

== Life history ==
They have been recorded preying on aphids.
