= Phrynocaria aurita =

Scientific classification
- Kingdom: Animalia
- Phylum: Arthropoda
- Clade: Pancrustacea
- Class: Insecta
- Order: Coleoptera
- Suborder: Polyphaga
- Infraorder: Cucujiformia
- Family: Coccinellidae
- Genus: Phrynocaria
- Species: P. aurita

Binomial name
- Phrynocaria aurita (Iablokoff-Khnzorian, 1982)

Synonyms
- Lemnia aurita Iablokoff-Khnzorian, 1982

Species of beetle

Phrynocaria aurita is a species of beetle of the family Coccinellidae. It is found in Indonesia (Western New Guinea) and Papua New Guinea.

== Description ==
Adults reach a length of about 4.8–5.1 mm (0.19–0.20 in). The head and antennae are yellow and the pronotum is orange or yellow with a black basal margin and partly darkened lateral margins. The scutellum is black and the elytra are orange, with the suture and margins black.
