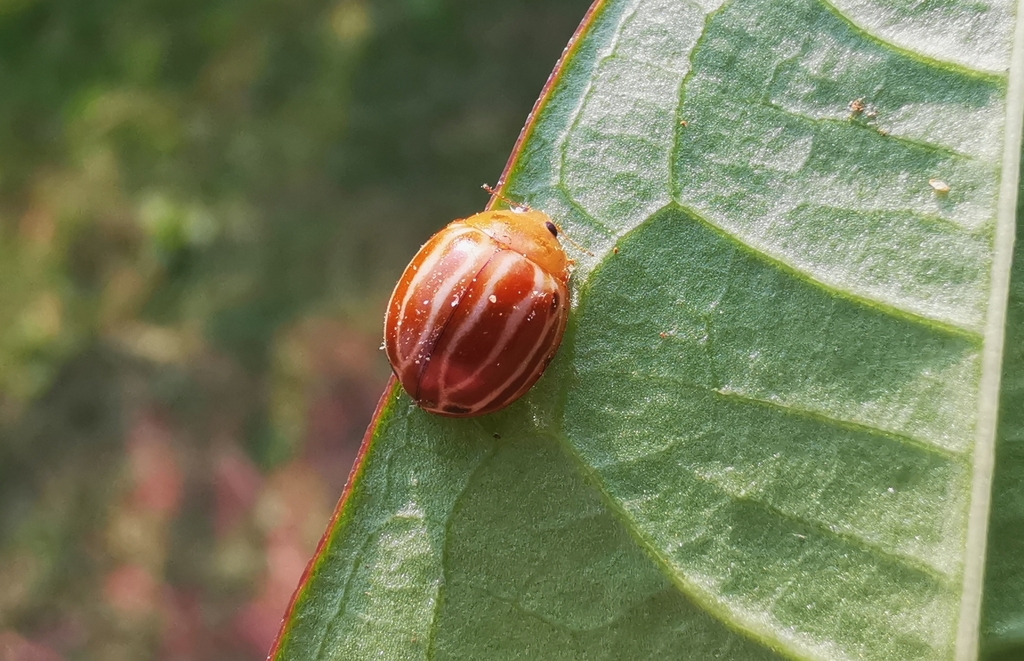

Scientific classification
- Kingdom: Animalia
- Phylum: Arthropoda
- Clade: Pancrustacea
- Class: Insecta
- Order: Coleoptera
- Suborder: Polyphaga
- Infraorder: Cucujiformia
- Family: Coccinellidae
- Genus: Microcaria
- Species: M. albolineata

Binomial name
- Microcaria albolineata (Gyllenhaal, 1808)

Synonyms
- Coccinella albolineata Gyllenhaal in Schönherr, 1808

= Microcaria albolineata =

Species of beetle

Microcaria albolineata is a species of beetle of the family Coccinellidae. It is found in India (Himachal Pradesh, Jammu & Kashmir, Manipur, Meghalaya, Nagaland, Sikkim, West Bengal), Nepal, China (including Hong Kong), Taiwan and Japan.

== Description ==
Adults reach a length of about 4.7–6.5 mm (0.19–0.26 in). The head is light brownish-yellow to testaceous and the pronotum is yellowish-testaceous, with two yellowish-brown spots in the middle. The elytra are dull brown with pale yellow markings.

== Life history ==
They have been recorded preying on adelgids and aphids.
