= Phrynocaria prathapani =

Scientific classification
- Kingdom: Animalia
- Phylum: Arthropoda
- Clade: Pancrustacea
- Class: Insecta
- Order: Coleoptera
- Suborder: Polyphaga
- Infraorder: Cucujiformia
- Family: Coccinellidae
- Genus: Phrynocaria
- Species: P. prathapani

Binomial name
- Phrynocaria prathapani Poorani, 2023

Species of beetle

Phrynocaria prathapani is a species of beetle of the family Coccinellidae. It is found in India (Kerala).

== Description ==
Adults reach a length of about 2.28 mm (0.090 in). The dorsal surface is yellowish-orange, while the ventral surface is paler and yellow.

== Etymology ==
The species is named for K. D. Prathapan, a chrysomelid specialist and collector of the only known specimen.
