= Phrynocaria crotchi =

Scientific classification
- Kingdom: Animalia
- Phylum: Arthropoda
- Clade: Pancrustacea
- Class: Insecta
- Order: Coleoptera
- Suborder: Polyphaga
- Infraorder: Cucujiformia
- Family: Coccinellidae
- Genus: Phrynocaria
- Species: P. crotchi

Binomial name
- Phrynocaria crotchi Li, Tomaszewska, Pang & Ślipiński, 2014

Synonyms
- Chilocorus wallacii Crotch, 1874 (preocc.)

Species of beetle

Phrynocaria crotchi is a species of beetle of the family Coccinellidae. It is found in Indonesia (Maluku Islands, Misool).

== Description ==
Adults reach a length of about 4.6–4.9 mm (0.18–0.19 in). The head and pronotum are yellow or orange and the scutellum is black or brown with black margins. The elytra are yellow or orange, with a black stripe along the suture, a median longitudinal stripe and a lateral stripe.
