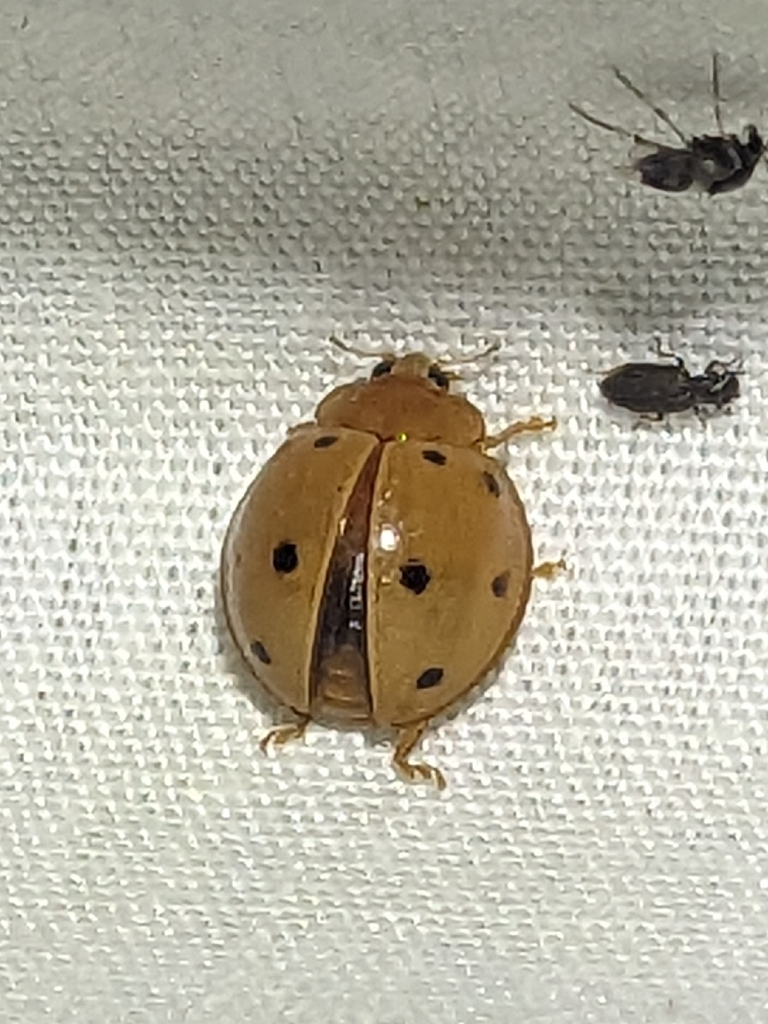

Scientific classification
- Kingdom: Animalia
- Phylum: Arthropoda
- Clade: Pancrustacea
- Class: Insecta
- Order: Coleoptera
- Suborder: Polyphaga
- Infraorder: Cucujiformia
- Family: Coccinellidae
- Genus: Microcaria
- Species: M. mulsanti

Binomial name
- Microcaria mulsanti (Montrouzier, 1861)

Synonyms
- Coccinella mulsanti Montrouzier, 1861; Coelophora ochracea Mulsant, 1866

= Microcaria mulsanti =

Species of beetle

Microcaria mulsanti is a species of beetle of the family Coccinellidae. It is found in Papua New Guinea, New Caledonia and Australia (Queensland, Northern Territory, Western Australia).

== Description ==
Adults reach a length of about 5–7 mm (0.20–0.28 in). The head and antennae are yellow and the pronotum is yellow with black borders. The scutellum is yellow with a dark lateral margin. The elytra are yellow with either ten black spots or with four longitudinal stripes at the base and six spots.
