= Phrynocaria eberti =

Scientific classification
- Kingdom: Animalia
- Phylum: Arthropoda
- Clade: Pancrustacea
- Class: Insecta
- Order: Coleoptera
- Suborder: Polyphaga
- Infraorder: Cucujiformia
- Family: Coccinellidae
- Genus: Phrynocaria
- Species: P. eberti

Binomial name
- Phrynocaria eberti (Bielawski, 1972)

Synonyms
- Coelophora eberti Bielawski, 1972

Species of beetle

Phrynocaria eberti is a species of beetle of the family Coccinellidae. It is found in northern India and Nepal.

== Description ==
They have an orange to yellow body with five black spots on each elytron.
