= Phrynocaria piciella =

Scientific classification
- Kingdom: Animalia
- Phylum: Arthropoda
- Clade: Pancrustacea
- Class: Insecta
- Order: Coleoptera
- Suborder: Polyphaga
- Infraorder: Cucujiformia
- Family: Coccinellidae
- Genus: Phrynocaria
- Species: P. piciella

Binomial name
- Phrynocaria piciella Jing, 1992

Species of beetle

Phrynocaria piciella is a species of beetle of the family Coccinellidae. It is found in China (Sichuan, Yunnan).

== Description ==
Adults reach a length of about 3.6–4.4 mm (0.14–0.17 in). The head is yellowish with a black macula at the posterior margin and the pronotum is blue with yellowish lateral and anterior margins. The elytra are bluish violet with a two central red spots.
