= Microcaria vivida =

Scientific classification
- Kingdom: Animalia
- Phylum: Arthropoda
- Clade: Pancrustacea
- Class: Insecta
- Order: Coleoptera
- Suborder: Polyphaga
- Infraorder: Cucujiformia
- Family: Coccinellidae
- Genus: Microcaria
- Species: M. vivida

Binomial name
- Microcaria vivida (Crotch, 1874)

Synonyms
- Coelophora vivida Crotch, 1874; Coelophora auberti Chazeau, 1978

Species of beetle

Microcaria vivida is a species of beetle of the family Coccinellidae. It is found on Vanuatu.

== Description ==
Adults reach a length of about 5–5.5 mm (0.20–0.22 in). The head and pronotum are orange or reddish, while the scutellum and elytra are orange-reddish, each elytron with three black patches, and with the borders and suture orange-reddish.
