= Phrynocaria funebris =

Scientific classification
- Kingdom: Animalia
- Phylum: Arthropoda
- Clade: Pancrustacea
- Class: Insecta
- Order: Coleoptera
- Suborder: Polyphaga
- Infraorder: Cucujiformia
- Family: Coccinellidae
- Genus: Phrynocaria
- Species: P. funebris

Binomial name
- Phrynocaria funebris (Crotch, 1874)

Synonyms
- Coelophora funebris Crotch, 1874

Species of beetle

Phrynocaria funebris is a species of beetle of the family Coccinellidae. It is found in India (Karnataka).

== Description ==
The head and pronotum are ochreous, the latter with a pair of black maculae on the basal margin and above these a pair of smaller transverse markings. The scutellum is black and the elytra are dark brown to black, with yellowish-ochreous lateral margins.
