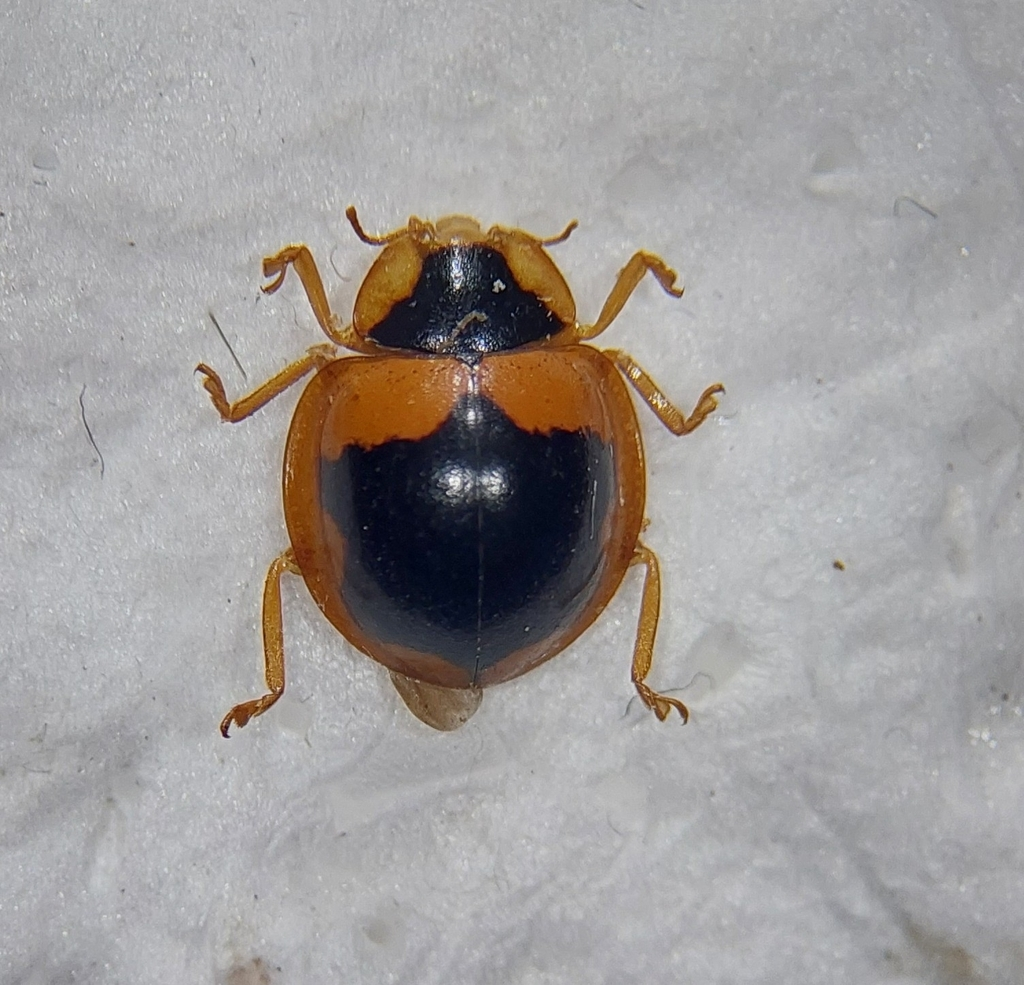

Scientific classification
- Kingdom: Animalia
- Phylum: Arthropoda
- Clade: Pancrustacea
- Class: Insecta
- Order: Coleoptera
- Suborder: Polyphaga
- Infraorder: Cucujiformia
- Family: Coccinellidae
- Genus: Microcaria
- Species: M. salomonensis

Binomial name
- Microcaria salomonensis (Korschefsky, 1940)

Synonyms
- Coelophora salomonensis Korschefsky, 1940

= Microcaria salomonensis =

Species of beetle

Microcaria salomonensis is a species of beetle of the family Coccinellidae. It is found on the Solomon Islands.

== Description ==
Adults reach a length of about 5–7 mm (0.20–0.28 in). The head and antennae are brown and the pronotum has a large black marking. The scutellum is black and the elytra are orange with dorsal black markings.
