= Phrynocaria bella =

Scientific classification
- Kingdom: Animalia
- Phylum: Arthropoda
- Clade: Pancrustacea
- Class: Insecta
- Order: Coleoptera
- Suborder: Polyphaga
- Infraorder: Cucujiformia
- Family: Coccinellidae
- Genus: Phrynocaria
- Species: P. bella

Binomial name
- Phrynocaria bella Zhu & Wang, 2026

Species of beetle

Phrynocaria bella is a species of beetle of the family Coccinellidae. It is found in China (Sichuan, Guangdong, Yunnan).

== Description ==
Adults reach a length of about 3.1–3.6 mm (0.12–0.14 in). The head is yellowish and the pronotum is yellowish with reddish macula at the pronotal disk. The scutellum is yellowish and the elytra are red with a central black spot, surrounded by C-shaped yellowish macula. The margin of the elytra is yellowish.

== Etymology ==
The species name is derived from Latin bellus and refers to the beautiful elytral coloration.
