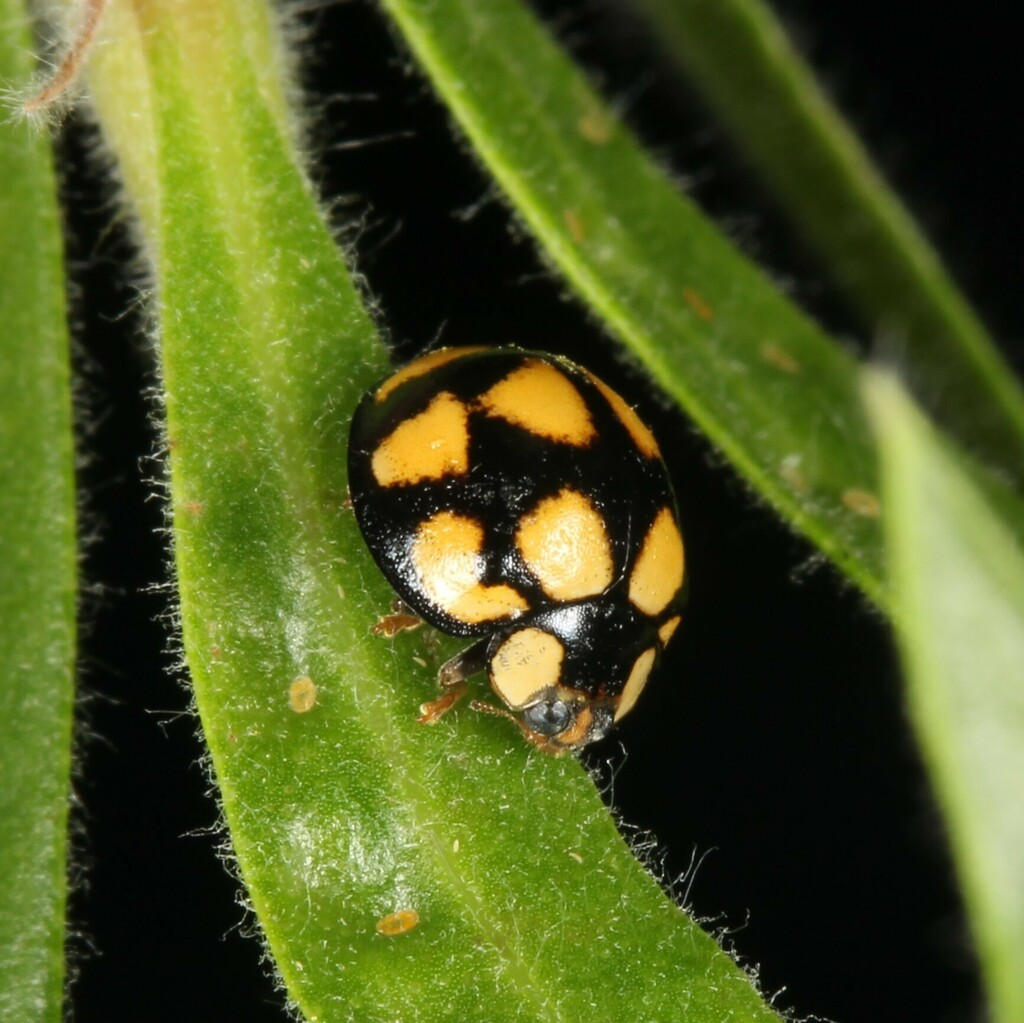

Scientific classification
- Kingdom: Animalia
- Phylum: Arthropoda
- Clade: Pancrustacea
- Class: Insecta
- Order: Coleoptera
- Suborder: Polyphaga
- Infraorder: Cucujiformia
- Family: Coccinellidae
- Genus: Phrynocaria
- Species: P. gratiosa

Binomial name
- Phrynocaria gratiosa (Mulsant, 1853)

Synonyms
- Coelophora gratiosa Mulsant, 1853; Coelophora elegans Crotch, 1874; Coelophora nigrovittata Blackburn, 1895; Phrynocaria gratiosa var. nigrocincta Timberlake, 1943; Phrynocaria gratiosa var. palens Timberlake, 1943; Phrynocaria gratiosa var. koebelei Timberlake, 1943

= Phrynocaria gratiosa =

Species of beetle

Phrynocaria gratiosa is a species of beetle of the family Coccinellidae. It is found in Australia (Queensland, New South Wales).

== Description ==
Adults reach a length of about 4.5–5.4 mm (0.18–0.21 in). The dorsal and ventral colour pattern is very variable, but the legs are usually at least partly dark colored.
