= Microcaria versipellis =

Scientific classification
- Kingdom: Animalia
- Phylum: Arthropoda
- Clade: Pancrustacea
- Class: Insecta
- Order: Coleoptera
- Suborder: Polyphaga
- Infraorder: Cucujiformia
- Family: Coccinellidae
- Genus: Microcaria
- Species: M. versipellis

Binomial name
- Microcaria versipellis (Mulsant, 1850)

Synonyms
- Coelophora versipellis Mulsant, 1850

Species of beetle

Microcaria versipellis is a species of beetle of the family Coccinellidae. It is found on the Philippines and in Indonesia (Java, Borneo, Ambon Island).

== Description ==
Adults reach a length of about 5.3–6.1 mm (0.21–0.24 in). The body is orange or reddish on both the ventral and dorsal sides, except for the black elytral suture. The lateral margins of the abdomen, antennae and legs are yellowish.
