= Phrynocaria astrolabiana =

Scientific classification
- Kingdom: Animalia
- Phylum: Arthropoda
- Clade: Pancrustacea
- Class: Insecta
- Order: Coleoptera
- Suborder: Polyphaga
- Infraorder: Cucujiformia
- Family: Coccinellidae
- Genus: Phrynocaria
- Species: P. astrolabiana

Binomial name
- Phrynocaria astrolabiana (Weise, 1902)

Synonyms
- Coelophora astrolabiana Weise, 1902

Species of beetle

Phrynocaria astrolabiana is a species of beetle of the family Coccinellidae. It is found in Indonesia (Western New Guinea), Papua New Guinea, the Solomon Islands and north-eastern Australia.

== Description ==
Adults reach a length of about 4–5 mm (0.16–0.20 in). They have a highly variable colour pattern, but the elytra do not have a pattern of longitudinal fasciae. The antennae are yellow and the scutellum is black or yellow, with black borders.
