= Phrynocaria =

Scientific classification
- Kingdom: Animalia
- Phylum: Arthropoda
- Clade: Pancrustacea
- Class: Insecta
- Order: Coleoptera
- Suborder: Polyphaga
- Infraorder: Cucujiformia
- Family: Coccinellidae
- Subfamily: Coccinellinae
- Tribe: Coccinellini
- Genus: Phrynocaria; Timberlake, 1943

Synonyms
- Artemis Mulsant, 1850 (preocc.); Phrynolemnia Iablokoff-Khnzorian, 1982; Pseudanegleis Iablokoff-Khnzorian, 1982; Neoartemis Ukrainsky, 2007

Genus of beetles

Phrynocaria is a genus of beetles belonging to the family Coccinellidae.

== Species ==
- Phrynocaria ambonina
- Phrynocaria astrolabiana
- Phrynocaria aurita
- Phrynocaria bella
- Phrynocaria circinatella
- Phrynocaria circumusta
- Phrynocaria crotchi
- Phrynocaria eberti
- Phrynocaria funebris
- Phrynocaria georgia
- Phrynocaria gratiosa
- Phrynocaria kolombangara
- Phrynocaria perfida
- Phrynocaria perrotteti
- Phrynocaria piciella
- Phrynocaria prathapani
- Phrynocaria quadrivittata
- Phrynocaria unicolor
- Phrynocaria varicolor (Crotch, 1874) (= Coelophora varicolor)
- Phrynocaria wallacii

== Selected former species ==
- Phrynocaria congener
- Phrynocaria decemguttata (now in Coelophora)
- Phrynocaria nigrilimbata
