= Phrynocaria quadrivittata =

Scientific classification
- Kingdom: Animalia
- Phylum: Arthropoda
- Clade: Pancrustacea
- Class: Insecta
- Order: Coleoptera
- Suborder: Polyphaga
- Infraorder: Cucujiformia
- Family: Coccinellidae
- Genus: Phrynocaria
- Species: P. quadrivittata

Binomial name
- Phrynocaria quadrivittata (Fauvel, 1903)

Synonyms
- Coelophora quadrivittata Fauvel, 1903

Species of beetle

Phrynocaria quadrivittata is a species of beetle of the family Coccinellidae. It is found in New Caledonia and Fiji.

== Description ==
Adults reach a length of about 4.4–5.3 mm (0.17–0.21 in). The typical colour form has a yellow head and antennae. The pronotum is yellow with the posterior part of the lateral borders black and the scutellum is completely yellow or has black borders. The elytra are yellow with four longitudinal stripes and four black spots. Another colour form has a black pronotum and the elytra have black margins and suture, each elytron with two longitudinal black stripes.

== Life history ==
They have been recorded preying on Coccus viridis.
