= Phrynocaria kolombangara =

Scientific classification
- Kingdom: Animalia
- Phylum: Arthropoda
- Clade: Pancrustacea
- Class: Insecta
- Order: Coleoptera
- Suborder: Polyphaga
- Infraorder: Cucujiformia
- Family: Coccinellidae
- Genus: Phrynocaria
- Species: P. kolombangara

Binomial name
- Phrynocaria kolombangara Ślipiński, Li & Pang, 2020

Species of beetle

Phrynocaria kolombangara is a species of beetle of the family Coccinellidae. It is found on the Solomon Islands.

== Description ==
Adults reach a length of about 5.1–5.7 mm (0.20–0.22 in). The head, antennae, pronotum and scutellum are orange-reddish. The elytra are black with two orange-red patches apically, and usually with orange-reddish lateral borders.
