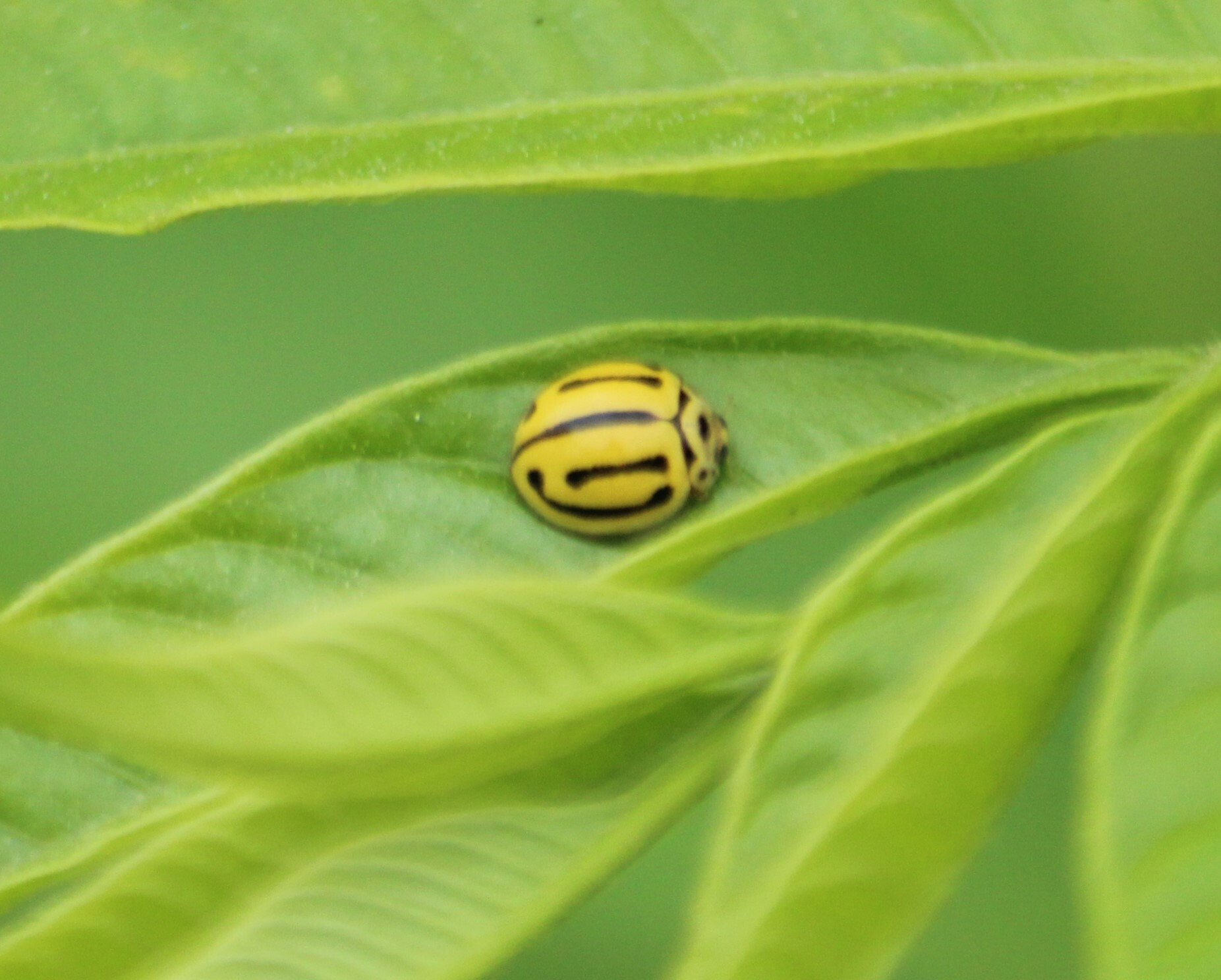

Scientific classification
- Kingdom: Animalia
- Phylum: Arthropoda
- Clade: Pancrustacea
- Class: Insecta
- Order: Coleoptera
- Suborder: Polyphaga
- Infraorder: Cucujiformia
- Family: Coccinellidae
- Genus: Phrynocaria
- Species: P. perrotteti

Binomial name
- Phrynocaria perrotteti (Mulsant, 1850)

Synonyms
- Coelophora perrotteti Mulsant, 1850

= Phrynocaria perrotteti =

Species of beetle

Phrynocaria perrotteti is a species of beetle of the family Coccinellidae. It is found in India (Delhi, Karnataka, Tamil Nadu, Pondicherry, Orissa, Punjab, West Bengal) and Pakistan.

== Description ==
Adults reach a length of about 4–4.7 mm (0.16–0.19 in). The typical form is pale creamy yellow to lemon yellow, with black markings on the pronotum and elytra. Other forms are completely black with pale yellow anterior and lateral margins of the pronotum, or completely orange to yellowish brown or even orange-yellow with four black spots.

== Life history ==
They have been recorded preying on whiteflies.
