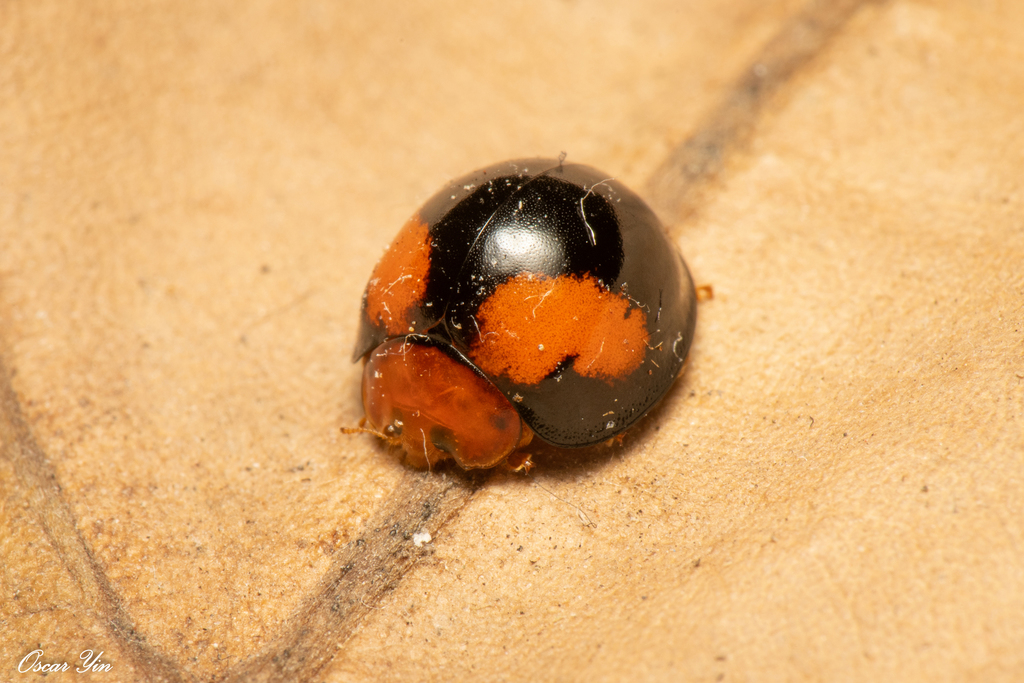

Scientific classification
- Kingdom: Animalia
- Phylum: Arthropoda
- Clade: Pancrustacea
- Class: Insecta
- Order: Coleoptera
- Suborder: Polyphaga
- Infraorder: Cucujiformia
- Family: Coccinellidae
- Genus: Phrynocaria
- Species: P. circumusta

Binomial name
- Phrynocaria circumusta (Mulsant, 1850)

Synonyms
- Artemis circumusta Mulsant, 1850; Artemis rufula Mulsant, 1850; Artemis mandarina Mulsant, 1850; Coelophora westermanni Mulsant, 1850; Coelophora moseri Weise, 1902

= Phrynocaria circumusta =

Species of beetle

Phrynocaria circumusta is a species of beetle of the family Coccinellidae. It is found in Indonesia (Misool, Key Islands), Papua New Guinea, India (Andhra Pradesh, Assam, Kerala, Jammu & Kashmir, Uttarakhand), Nepal, Thailand, Vietnam, China (Hong Kong, Guizhou, Fujian, Guangdong, Guangxi, Hainan) and Taiwan.

== Description ==
Adults reach a length of about 6.2–7 mm (0.24–0.28 in). The typical colour form has reddish elytra with a large black macula, while the melanic form has lateral yellow spots on a black pronotum.
