= Phrynocaria circinatella =

Scientific classification
- Kingdom: Animalia
- Phylum: Arthropoda
- Clade: Pancrustacea
- Class: Insecta
- Order: Coleoptera
- Suborder: Polyphaga
- Infraorder: Cucujiformia
- Family: Coccinellidae
- Genus: Phrynocaria
- Species: P. circinatella

Binomial name
- Phrynocaria circinatella (Jing, 1992)

Synonyms
- Bothrocalvia circinatella Jing, 1992; Microcaria circinatella

Species of beetle

Phrynocaria circinatella is a species of beetle of the family Coccinellidae. It is found in China (Shaanxi, Sichuan, Yunnan).

== Description ==
Adults reach a length of about 3.1–3.3 mm (0.12–0.13 in). The pronotum is yellowish and the elytra are yellowish with four black spots on each elytron. The scutellum is black and the legs are yellowish.
