= Kiiro =

Scientific classification
- Kingdom: Animalia
- Phylum: Arthropoda
- Clade: Pancrustacea
- Class: Insecta
- Order: Coleoptera
- Suborder: Polyphaga
- Infraorder: Cucujiformia
- Family: Coccinellidae
- Subfamily: Coccinellinae
- Tribe: Coccinellini
- Genus: Kiiro; Kitano, 2014

Genus of beetles

Kiiro is a genus of beetles in the Coccinellidae family.

== Description ==
Kiiro beetles are moderate in size and circular to ovate and weakly convex in shape. They are vivid to dull yellow in color, with whitish-yellow pronotum marked with two black spots at the base. They have large eyes and antennae that are distinctly longer than the width of the head.

== Species ==
- Kiiro cincta Fabricus, 1798
- Kiiro confusa Timberlake, 1943
- Kiiro koeblei Timberlake, 1943
- Kiiro koblei amamiana Miyatake, 1959
- Kiiro shensinensis Timberlake, 1943
- Kiiro indica Timberlake, 1943
