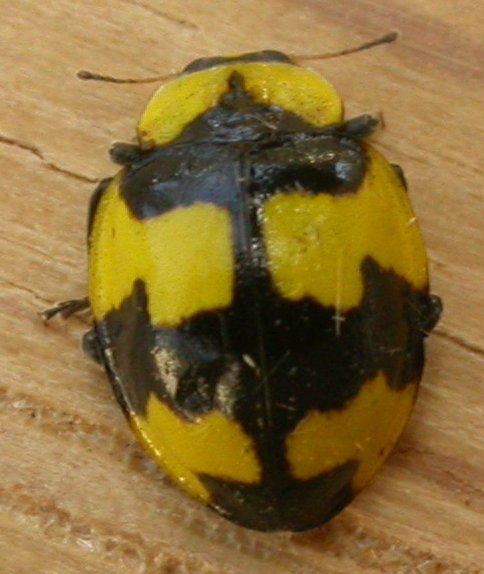

Scientific classification
- Kingdom: Animalia
- Phylum: Arthropoda
- Clade: Pancrustacea
- Class: Insecta
- Order: Coleoptera
- Suborder: Polyphaga
- Infraorder: Cucujiformia
- Family: Coccinellidae
- Genus: Illeis
- Species: I. galbula

Binomial name
- Illeis galbula (Mulsant, 1850)

Synonyms
- Psyllobora galbula Mulsant, 1850; Leptothea csikii Weise, 1902; Leptothea moseri Weise, 1902

= Illeis galbula =

Species of beetle

Illeis galbula, the fungus-eating ladybird, is a species of beetle in the family Coccinellidae.

== Description ==
Adults are 4-5mm in size, while the larvae are between 8 and 10mm. Adults are black with bright yellow markings. Larvae are grey with black tubercles covered with short spines. The pupa is pale yellow with black tubercles and lateral spurs.

== Behaviour ==
During the day it is fast moving and readily flies or drops when disturbed. The pupa are active and often stand on end. Adult and larval fungus-eating ladybirds are often found in gardens where they eat powdery mildew on cucurbit crops like pumpkin and zucchini. In Australia, overwintering adults feed on pollen of wattles and privet species during spring.

== Distribution ==
This species is native to Eastern Australia. It is a non-native species in the North Island of New Zealand, first found in Auckland in 1985. They are also found in New Guinea.

== Gallery ==
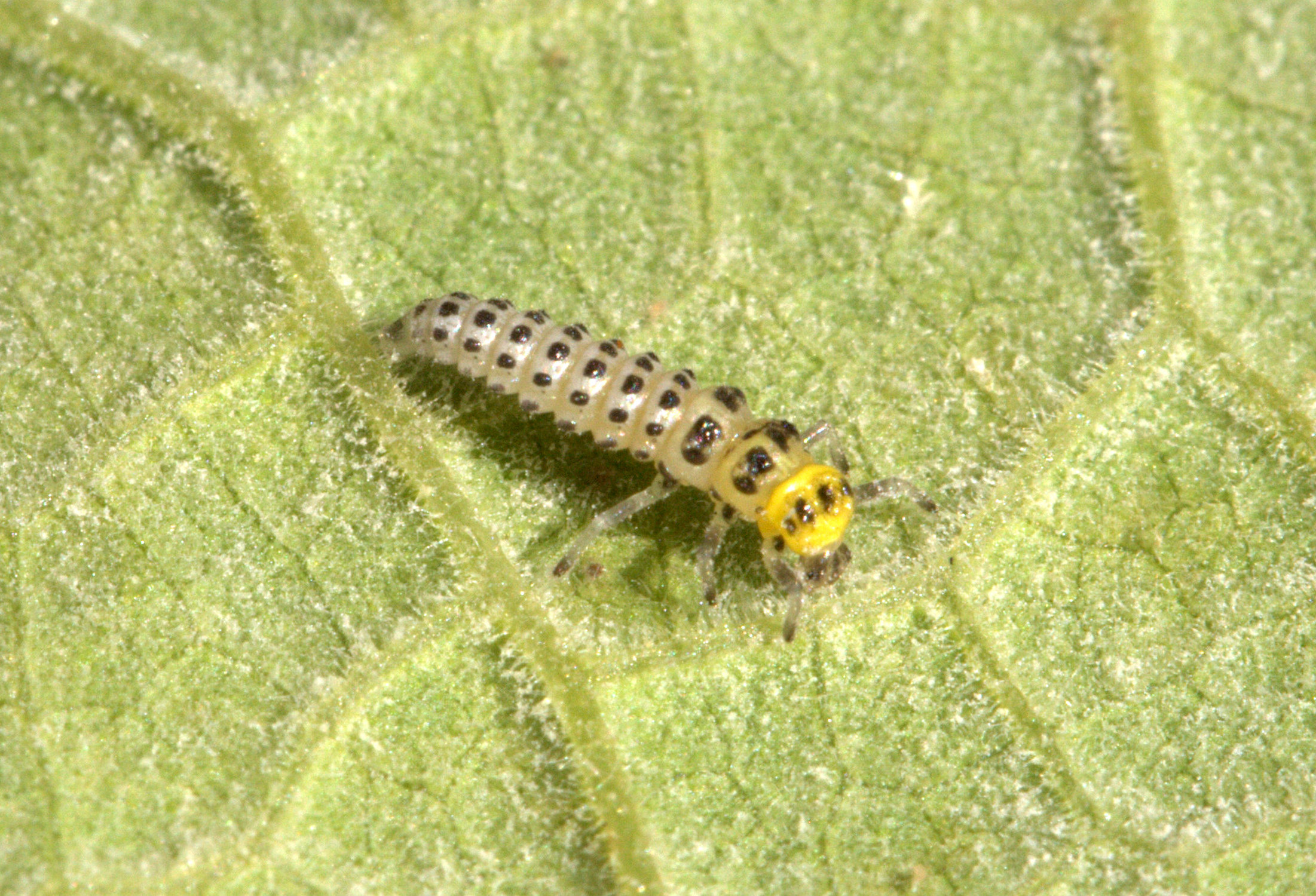
Larval form

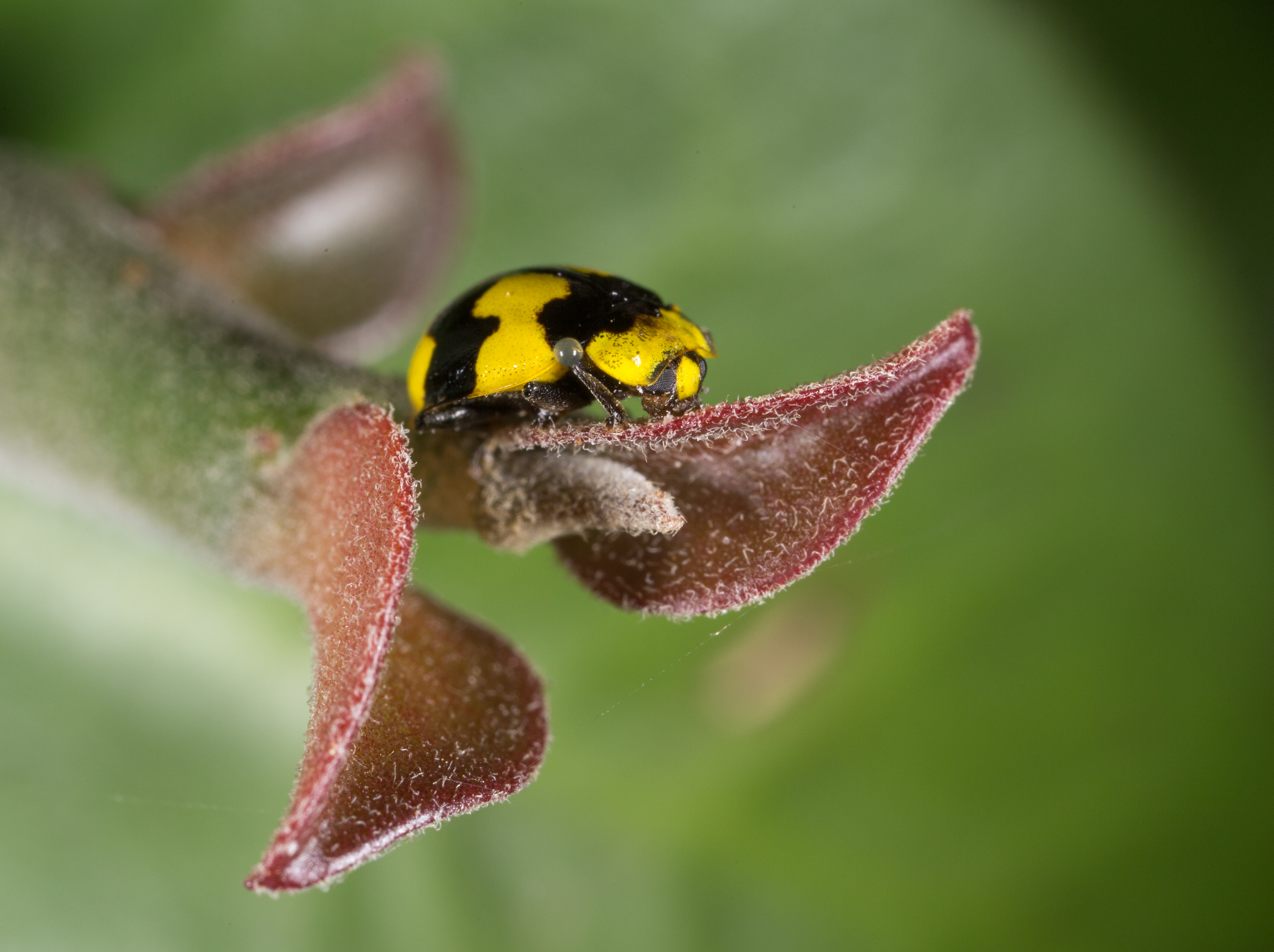
Fungus-eating ladybird, Binalong Bay, Australia

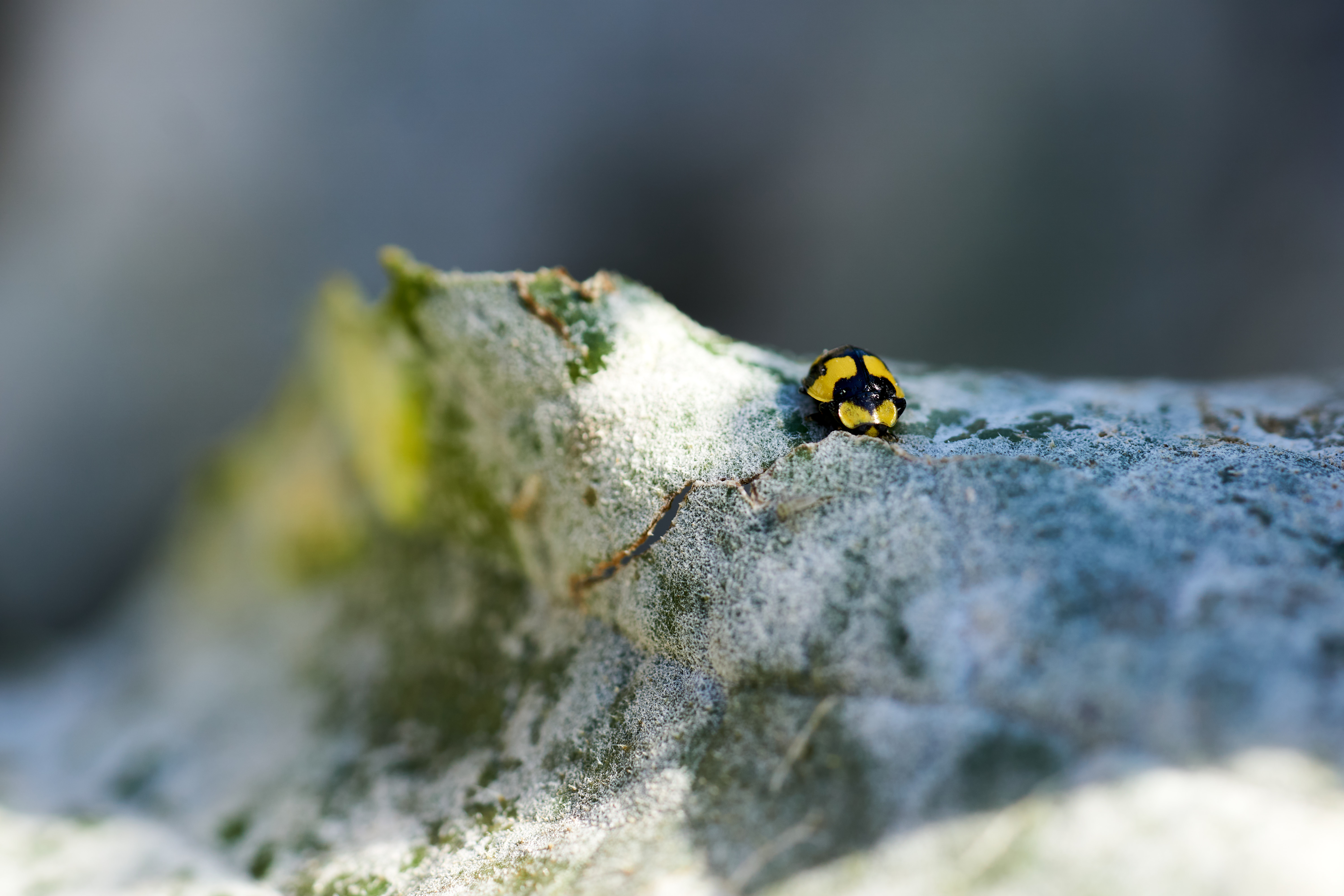
Fungus-eating ladybird eating powdery mildew on zucchini leaf

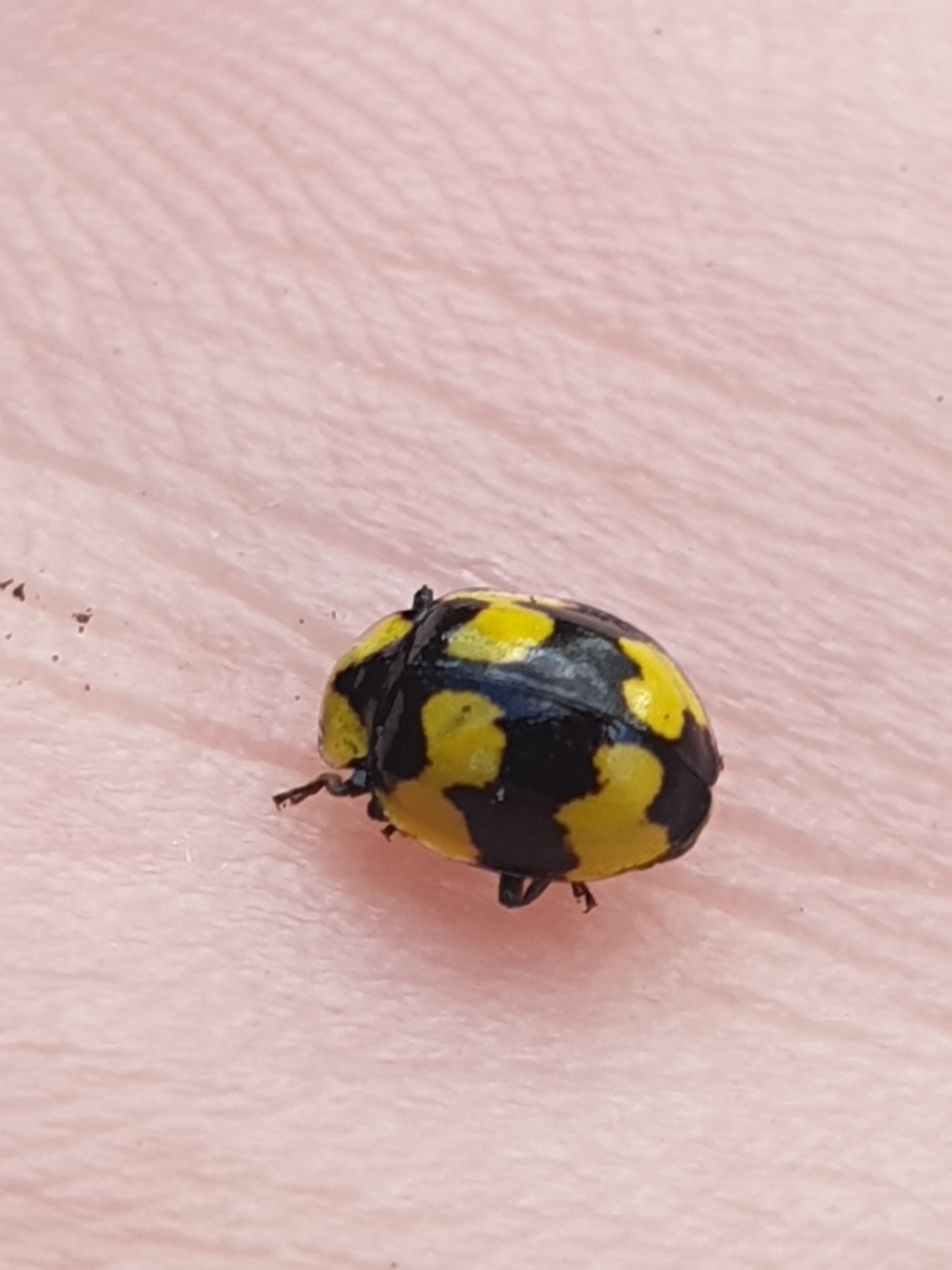
Illeis galbula on a hand
