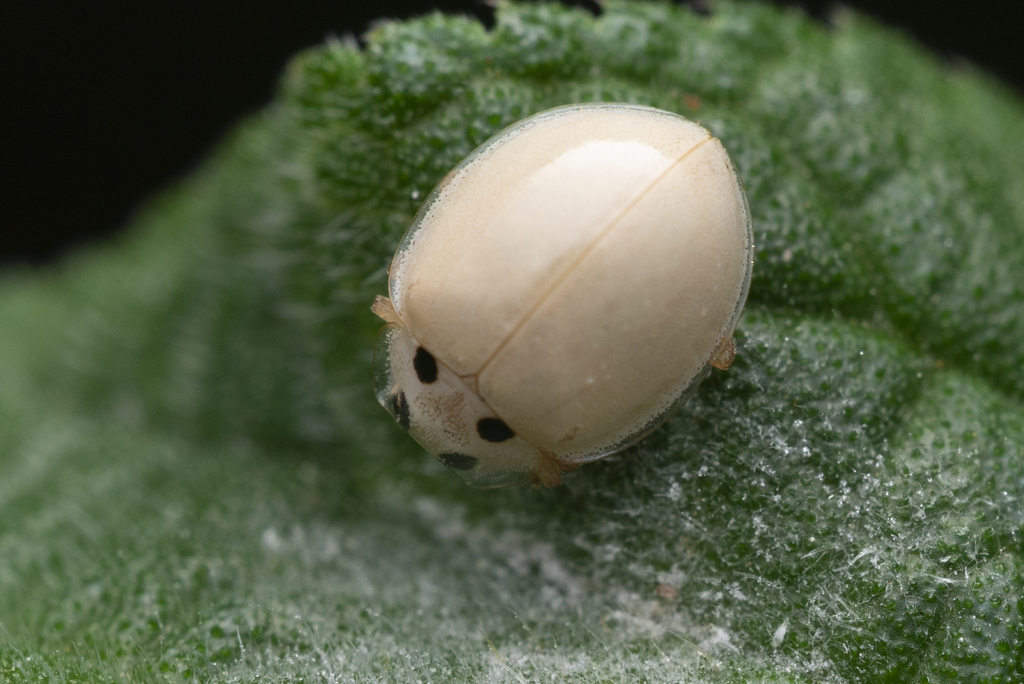

Scientific classification
- Kingdom: Animalia
- Phylum: Arthropoda
- Clade: Pancrustacea
- Class: Insecta
- Order: Coleoptera
- Suborder: Polyphaga
- Infraorder: Cucujiformia
- Family: Coccinellidae
- Genus: Illeis
- Species: I. confusa

Binomial name
- Illeis confusa Timberlake, 1943

Synonyms
- Illeis chinensis Yablokov-Khnzoryan, 1978

= Illeis confusa =

Species of beetle

Illeis confusa is a species of beetle of the family Coccinellidae. It is found in India (Arunachal Pradesh, Assam, Jammu & Kashmir, Manipur, Meghalaya, Nagaland, Sikkim, Tripura, Uttarakhand, West Bengal), Nepal, Bhutan, Thailand and China (including Hong Kong).

== Description ==
Adults reach a length of about 5–6 mm (0.20–0.24 in). They are similar to Illeis cincta, but variable in colour. The head and pronotum are creamy white and the elytra are lemon yellow, pinkish-fawn or creamy yellow. The pronotum has two black spots.

== Life history ==
They have been recorded feeding on powdery mildews.
