= Illeis flava =

Scientific classification
- Kingdom: Animalia
- Phylum: Arthropoda
- Clade: Pancrustacea
- Class: Insecta
- Order: Coleoptera
- Suborder: Polyphaga
- Infraorder: Cucujiformia
- Family: Coccinellidae
- Genus: Illeis
- Species: I. flava

Binomial name
- Illeis flava Pope, 1989

Species of beetle

Illeis flava is a species of beetle of the family Coccinellidae. It is found in Australia (Queensland, northern New South Wales).

== Description ==
Adults reach a length of about 4.4–5 mm (0.17–0.20 in). The head and sides of the pronotum are white-cream colored, while the central part of the pronotum has a black marking and dark lateral margins. The elytra are yellow.
