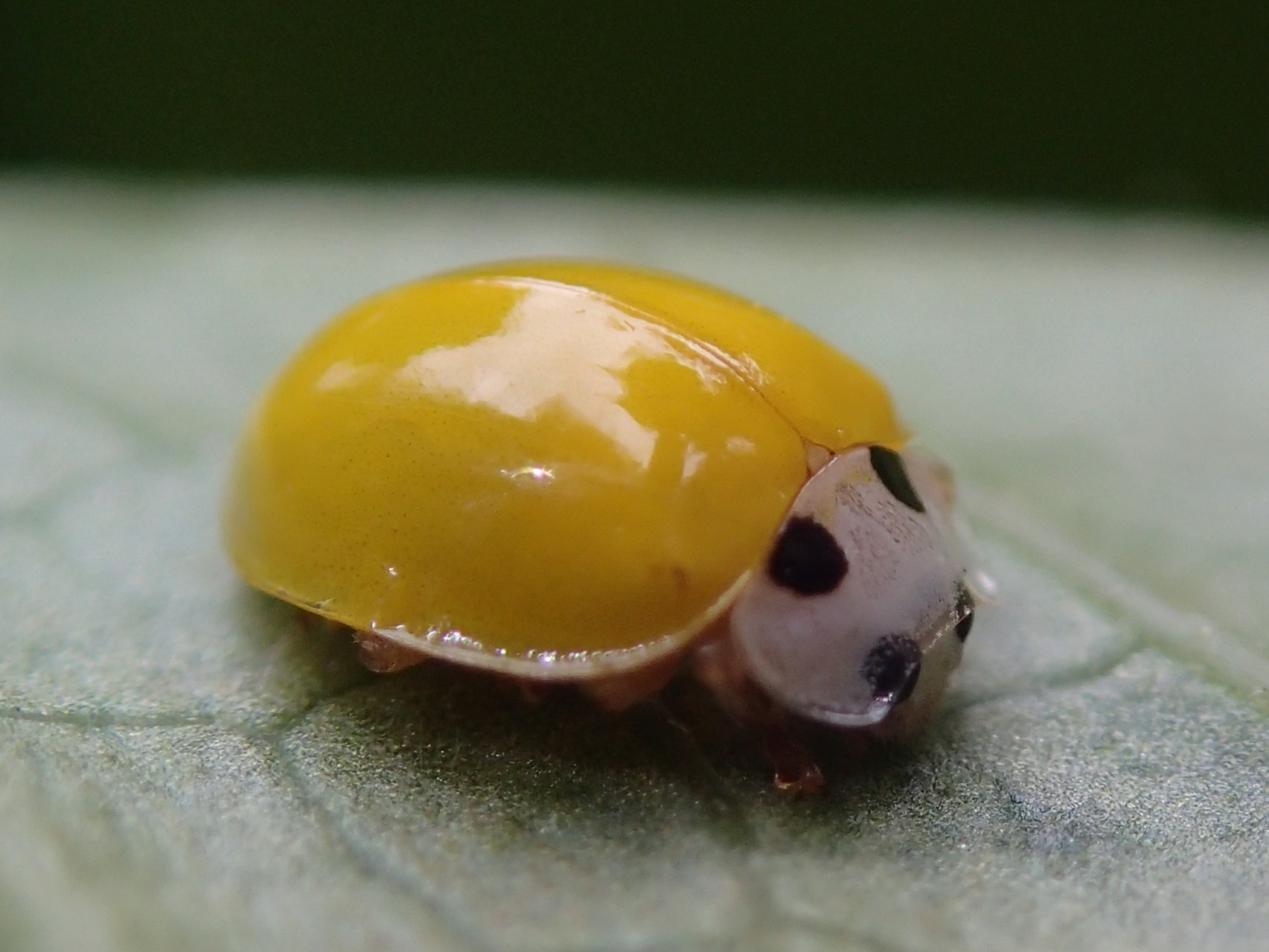

Scientific classification
- Kingdom: Animalia
- Phylum: Arthropoda
- Clade: Pancrustacea
- Class: Insecta
- Order: Coleoptera
- Suborder: Polyphaga
- Infraorder: Cucujiformia
- Family: Coccinellidae
- Genus: Illeis
- Species: I. koebelei

Binomial name
- Illeis koebelei Timberlake, 1943

Synonyms
- Kiiro koebelei

= Illeis koebelei =

Species of beetle

Illeis koebelei, the yellow ladybird beetle, is a species of beetle of the family Coccinellidae. It is found in India (Assam), Japan, Taiwan and China.

== Description ==
Adults reach a length of about 3.5–5.1 mm (0.14–0.20 in). The dorsal surface is yellow with a two oval black spots on the posterior margin of the pronotum.

== Subspecies ==
- Illeis koebelei koebelei
- Illeis koebelei amamiana Miyatake, 1959
