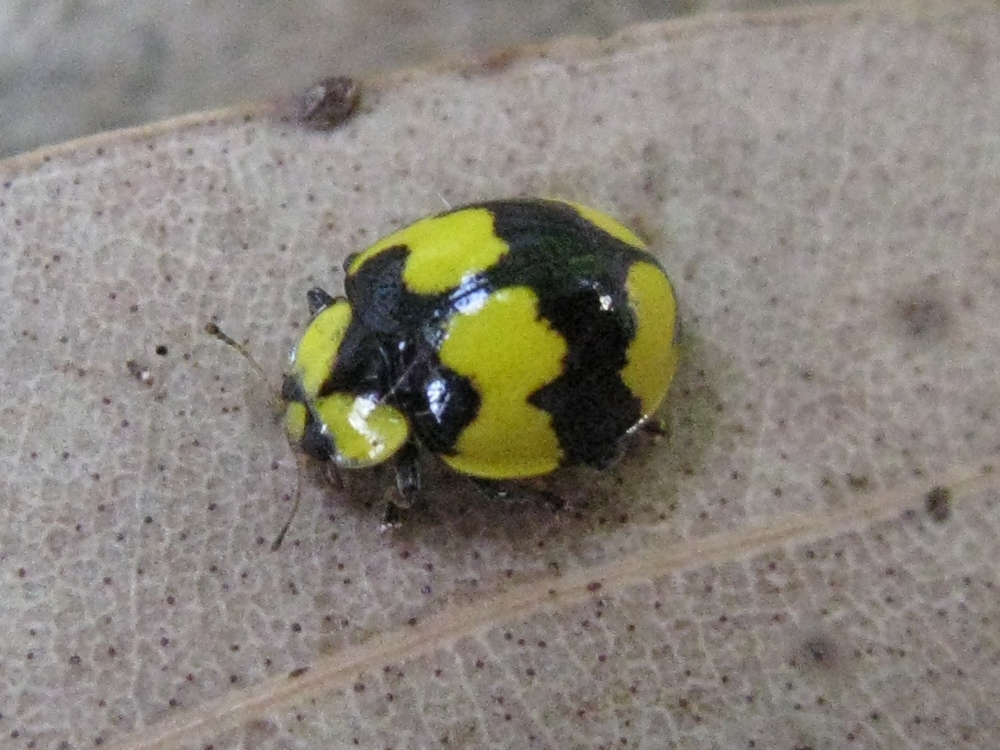
- Illeis galbula, Australia

Scientific classification
- Kingdom: Animalia
- Phylum: Arthropoda
- Clade: Pancrustacea
- Class: Insecta
- Order: Coleoptera
- Suborder: Polyphaga
- Infraorder: Cucujiformia
- Family: Coccinellidae
- Subfamily: Coccinellinae
- Tribe: Coccinellini
- Genus: Illeis; Mulsant, 1850

Synonyms
- Anchilleis Iablokoff-Khnzorian, 1979; Bielawskia Iablokoff-Khnzorian, 1984; Leptothea Weise, 1898

= Illeis =

Genus of beetles

Illeis is a genus of ladybird beetles in the family Coccinellidae. There are 12 described species in Illeis, found in south and southeast Asia, and in Oceania. They genus contains some of the few species of Coccinellidae beetles to feed on fungi.

== Species ==
These 12 species belong to the genus Illeis:

=== Subgenus Illeis (Illeis) Mulsant, 1850 ===
- Illeis flava (Pope, 1988)
- Illeis galbula (Mulsant, 1850)

=== Subgenus Illeis (Hibachi) Kitano, 2014 ===
- Illeis amboinensis Timberlake, 1943
- Illeis bielawskii Poorani & Lalitha, 2018
- Illeis bistigmosa Mulsant, 1850
- Illeis confusa Timberlake, 1943
- Illeis gressitti Bielawski, 1961
- Illeis indica Timberlake, 1943
- Illeis koebelei Timberlake, 1943
- Illeis luzonica Timberlake, 1943
- Illeis nevillei (Dohrn, 1882)
- Illeis ranamese (Bielawski, 1960)
- Illeis shensiensis Timberlake, 1943
- Illeis timberlakei (Bielawski, 1961)
- Illeis wyliei Ślipiński, Li & Pang, 2020

== Selected former species ==
- Illeis chinensis Iablokoff-Khnzorian, 1978
