= Illeis gressitti =

Scientific classification
- Kingdom: Animalia
- Phylum: Arthropoda
- Clade: Pancrustacea
- Class: Insecta
- Order: Coleoptera
- Suborder: Polyphaga
- Infraorder: Cucujiformia
- Family: Coccinellidae
- Genus: Illeis
- Species: I. gressitti

Binomial name
- Illeis gressitti Bielawski, 1961

Species of beetle

Illeis gressitti is a species of beetle of the family Coccinellidae. It is found in Indonesia (Western New Guinea) and Papua New Guinea.

== Description ==
Adults reach a length of about 5.7–6.2 mm (0.22–0.24 in). The head and antennae are yellow and the pronotum is pale with three black spots in the centre. The scutellum is black and the elytra are yellow, with transparent anterior and lateral borders.
