= Illeis shensiensis =

Scientific classification
- Kingdom: Animalia
- Phylum: Arthropoda
- Clade: Pancrustacea
- Class: Insecta
- Order: Coleoptera
- Suborder: Polyphaga
- Infraorder: Cucujiformia
- Family: Coccinellidae
- Genus: Illeis
- Species: I. shensiensis

Binomial name
- Illeis shensiensis Timberlake, 1943

Synonyms
- Kiiro shensiensis

Species of beetle

Illeis shensiensis is a species of beetle of the family Coccinellidae. It is found in India (Arunachal Pradesh) and China.

== Description ==
They are similar to other Illeis species from India. There are two spots on the pronotum and the elytra are yellow.
