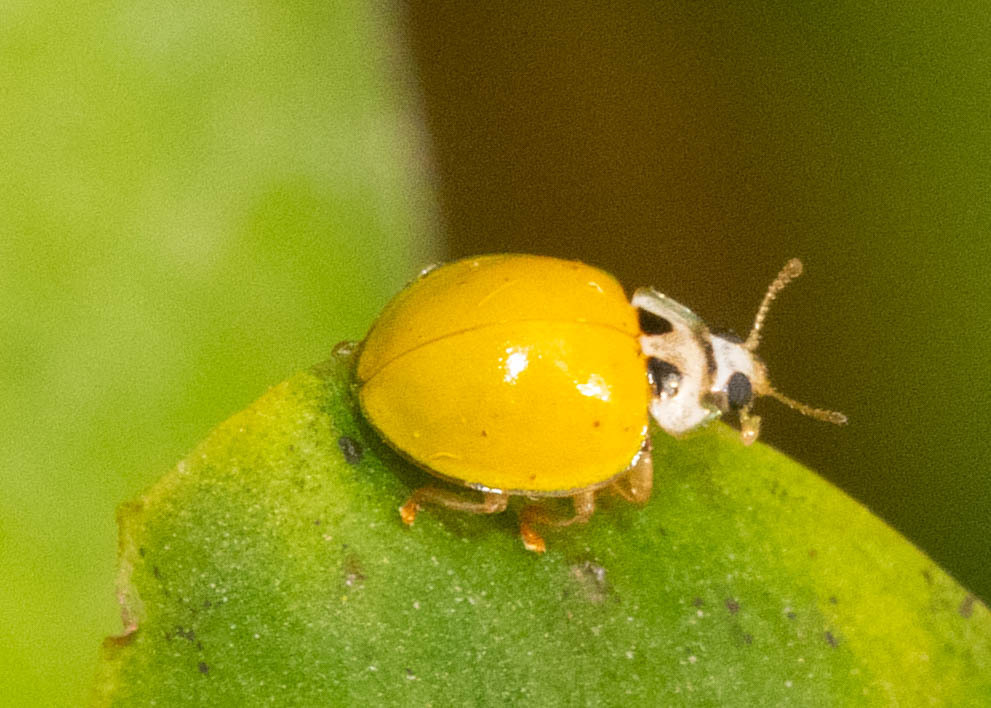

Scientific classification
- Kingdom: Animalia
- Phylum: Arthropoda
- Clade: Pancrustacea
- Class: Insecta
- Order: Coleoptera
- Suborder: Polyphaga
- Infraorder: Cucujiformia
- Family: Coccinellidae
- Subfamily: Coccinellinae
- Tribe: Coccinellini
- Genus: Illeis
- Species: I. bistigmosa

Binomial name
- Illeis bistigmosa (Mulsant, 1850)

Synonyms
- Psyllobora bistigmosa Mulsant, 1850; Illeis bistigmosa Crotch, 1871; Illeis bielawskii Ghorpade, 1976; Psyllobora bistigmosa (Mulsant, 1850); Psyllobora simplex Mulsant, 1866

= Illeis bistigmosa =

Species of beetle

Illeis (Hibachi) bistigmosa, is a species of lady beetle native to India, and Sri Lanka.

== Description ==
Eyes are large, and moderately faceted. The interval between the eyes as wide as an eye. Mandibles are bifid at apex and more coarsely dentate at inner margin.

== Biology ==
It is a mycophagous coccinellid associated with powdery mildew in various crops such as mulberry where it feeds on the fungus, Phyllactinia corylea that causes powdery mildew of mulberry, and Erysiphe cichoracearum causing powdery mildew on sunflower.
