= Illeis wyliei =

Scientific classification
- Kingdom: Animalia
- Phylum: Arthropoda
- Clade: Pancrustacea
- Class: Insecta
- Order: Coleoptera
- Suborder: Polyphaga
- Infraorder: Cucujiformia
- Family: Coccinellidae
- Genus: Illeis
- Species: I. wyliei

Binomial name
- Illeis wyliei Ślipiński, Li & Pang, 2020

Species of beetle

Illeis wyliei is a species of beetle of the family Coccinellidae. It is found in Indonesia (Western New Guinea) and Papua New Guinea.

== Description ==
Adults reach a length of about 4.3–5.3 mm (0.17–0.21 in). The head and antennae are pale yellow and the pronotum is pale with black spots medially and with transparent lateral and anterior borders. The elytra are yellow and the scutellum is black.

== Etymology ==
The species is named after Dr Ross Wylie, who collected the holotype.
