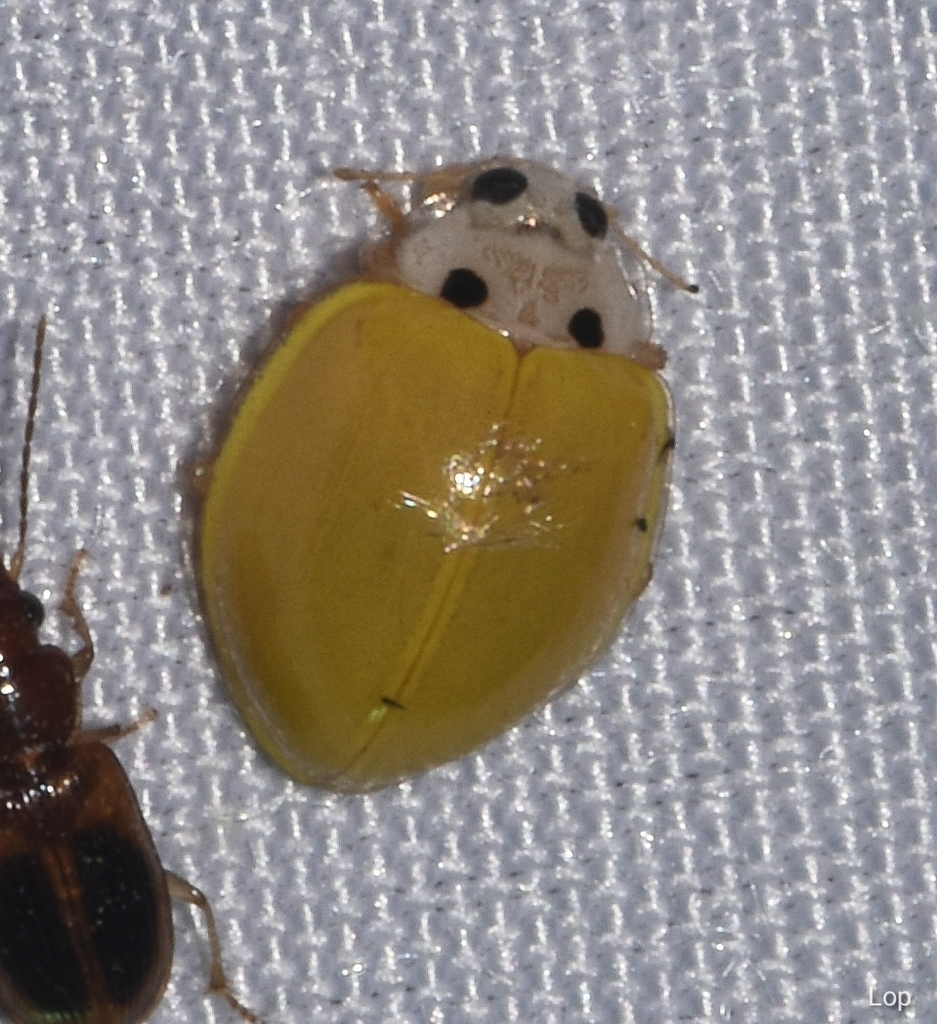

Scientific classification
- Kingdom: Animalia
- Phylum: Arthropoda
- Clade: Pancrustacea
- Class: Insecta
- Order: Coleoptera
- Suborder: Polyphaga
- Infraorder: Cucujiformia
- Family: Coccinellidae
- Genus: Illeis
- Species: I. indica

Binomial name
- Illeis indica Timberlake, 1943

Synonyms
- Kiiro indica

= Illeis indica =

Species of beetle

Illeis indica, the yellow ladybird beetle, is a species of beetle of the family Coccinellidae. It is found in India (Arunachal Pradesh, Bihar, Haryana, Himachal Pradesh, Meghalaya, Odisha, Punjab, Tripura, Uttarakhand, Uttar Pradesh, West Bengal, Andaman Islands), Bangladesh, Pakistan and Thailand.

== Description ==
Adults reach a length of about 4.7–5 mm (0.19–0.20 in). They are similar to Illeis confusa in coloration, but have a more elongate body.

== Life history ==
They have been recorded feeding on powdery mildews.
