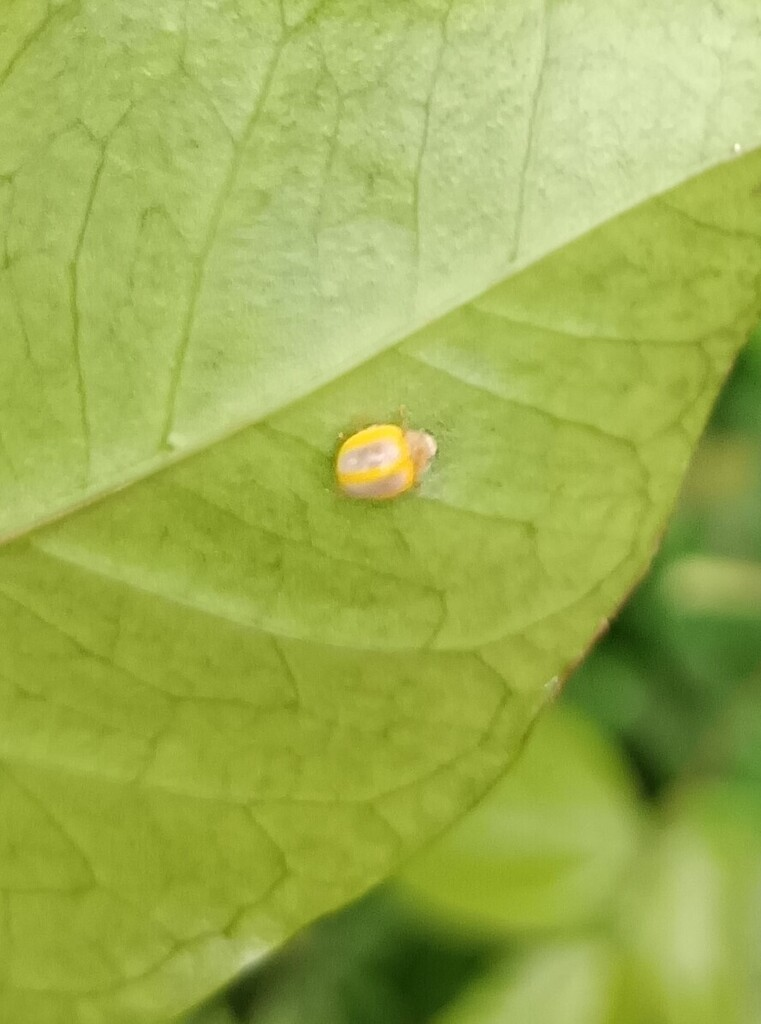

Scientific classification
- Kingdom: Animalia
- Phylum: Arthropoda
- Clade: Pancrustacea
- Class: Insecta
- Order: Coleoptera
- Suborder: Polyphaga
- Infraorder: Cucujiformia
- Family: Coccinellidae
- Genus: Illeis
- Species: I. bielawskii

Binomial name
- Illeis bielawskii Ghorpadé, 1976

= Illeis bielawskii =

Species of beetle

Illeis bielawskii is a species of beetle of the family Coccinellidae. It is found in India (Goa, Karnataka, Kerala, Tamil Nadu), Nepal, Sri Lanka, Thailand, Indonesia, Malaysia and China.

== Description ==
Adults reach a length of about 2.7–4.35 mm (0.106–0.171 in). The pronotum is yellow and the elytra are lemon yellow with two greyish discal patches. The lateral margins of the pronotum and elytra are transparent.

== Life history ==
They have been recorded feeding on powdery mildews.
