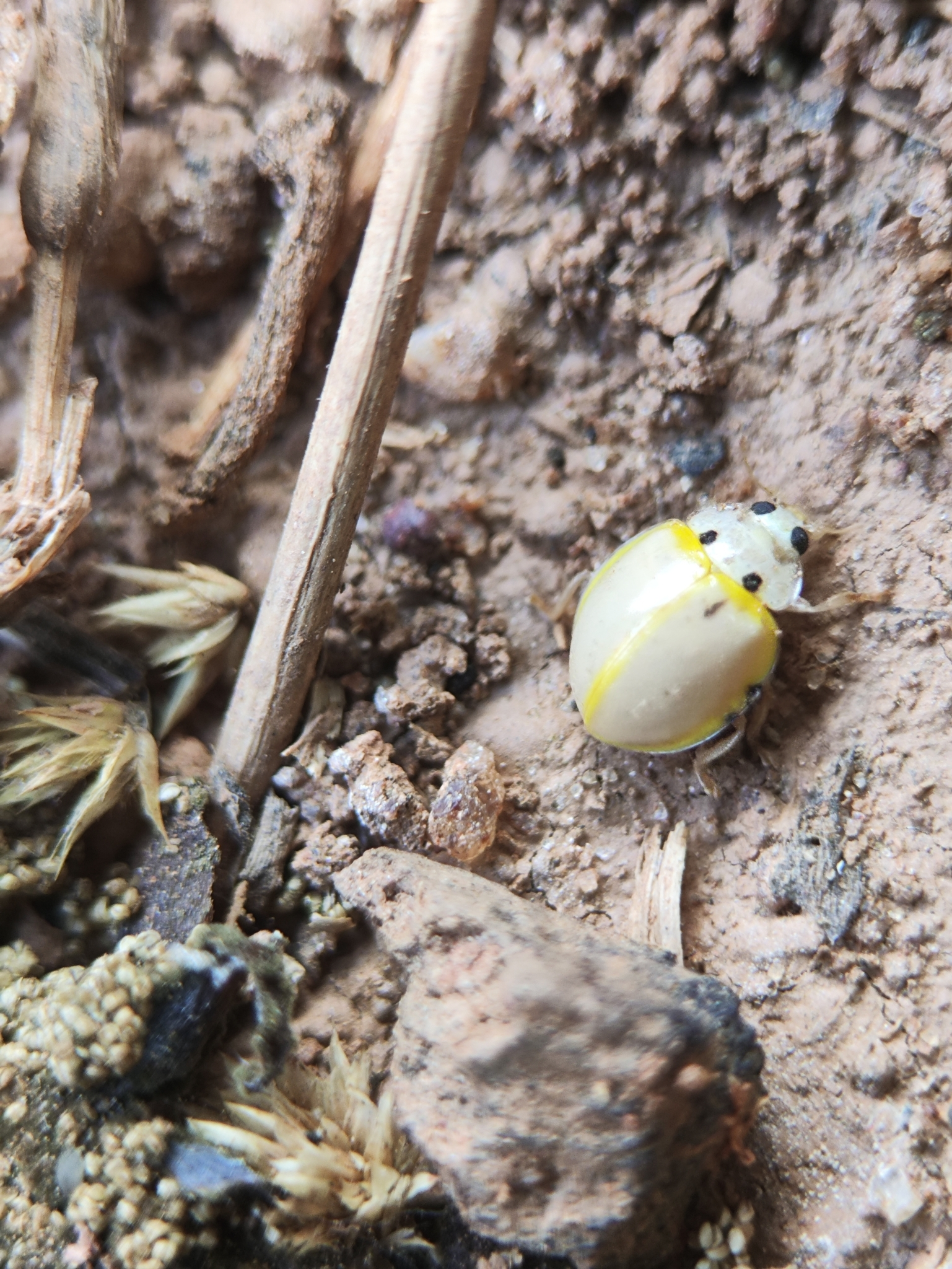

Scientific classification
- Kingdom: Animalia
- Phylum: Arthropoda
- Clade: Pancrustacea
- Class: Insecta
- Order: Coleoptera
- Suborder: Polyphaga
- Infraorder: Cucujiformia
- Family: Coccinellidae
- Genus: Kiiro
- Species: K. cincta

Binomial name
- Kiiro cincta (Fabricius, 1798)

Synonyms
- Coccinella cincta Fabricius, 1798; Illeis cincta (Fabricius, 1798); Illeis darbarii Sathe & Bhosale, 2002

= Kiiro cincta =

Species of beetle

Kiiro cincta is a species of lady beetle native to India, Sri Lanka and Indonesia.

== Description ==
Eggs are creamy white in color and round in shape. Female lays eggs in a group of 10 to 15 which are glued on lower surface of leaves. Before hatching, eggs become grayish black. The incubation period is about three days. Eggs are followed by four stages of instar larvae. Larvae pale yellow in color. Larva has three pairs of legs and four rows of minute dots. Body completely covered with minute hairs. There are three pairs of spots prominent on thoracic segments. These spots are larger and brighter than the other body spots.

Pupa pale yellow in color with black spots. After one of week pupation, adult beetle emerges. Adult is about 4 to 6 mm in length. Elytra yellowish. Body elongate oval and convex. Head is fairly visible. A pair of black spot can be found on pronotum. Eyes are prominent. Antenna are long, with a loosely jointed three segmented club. Female is comparatively larger than male. Life cycle completes within four weeks.

== Biology ==
It is a mycophagous coccinellid associated with powdery mildew in various crops such as Dalbergia sissoo and Xanthium strumarium. It is also known to feed on the fungus, Phyllactinia corylea that causes powdery mildew of mulberry and Erysiphe cichoracearum causing powdery mildew on sunflower. Adult is a voracious predator on Aphis gossypii, Myzus persicae and Amrasca devastans.

The species of spider mite, Tetranychus neocaledonicus is a known predator that attack both adults and nymphs.
