= Pentilia ernestine =

Scientific classification
- Kingdom: Animalia
- Phylum: Arthropoda
- Class: Insecta
- Order: Coleoptera
- Suborder: Polyphaga
- Infraorder: Cucujiformia
- Family: Coccinellidae
- Genus: Pentilia
- Species: P. ernestine

Binomial name
- Pentilia ernestine Gordon & González, 2019

Species of beetle

Pentilia ernestine is a species of beetle of the family Coccinellidae. It is found in Colombia.

== Description ==
Adults reach a length of about 2.8 mm. Adults are reddish yellow with a yellow head. The lateral one-third of the pronotum is yellow, while the median one-third is dark brown with a faint reddish median spot. The elytron is reddish yellow with a dark brown spot.
