= Calloeneis signata =

Scientific classification
- Kingdom: Animalia
- Phylum: Arthropoda
- Clade: Pancrustacea
- Class: Insecta
- Order: Coleoptera
- Suborder: Polyphaga
- Infraorder: Cucujiformia
- Family: Coccinellidae
- Genus: Calloeneis
- Species: C. signata

Binomial name
- Calloeneis signata (Korschefsky, 1936)

Synonyms
- Cryptognatha signata Korschefsky, 1936

Species of beetle

Calloeneis signata is a species of beetle of the family Coccinellidae. It is found in Argentina, Brazil, Guyana, Paraguay and Peru.

== Description ==
Adults reach a length of about 1.7–2.1 mm. They have a yellow body. The median one-third of the pronotum is brown. The suture of the elytron is brown and there is a brown sutural vitta. There is also a large marking on the basal half with a small yellow spot.
