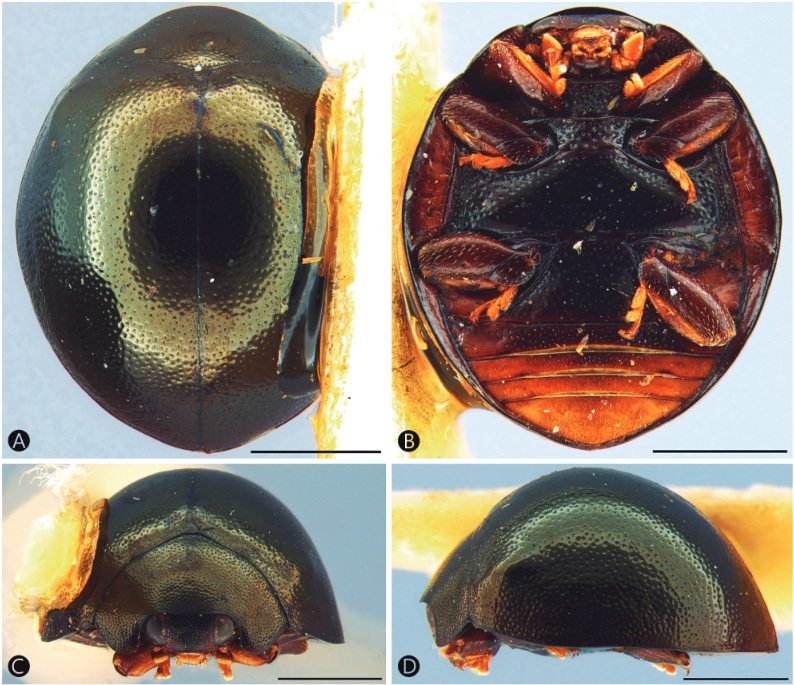

Scientific classification
- Kingdom: Animalia
- Phylum: Arthropoda
- Clade: Pancrustacea
- Class: Insecta
- Order: Coleoptera
- Suborder: Polyphaga
- Infraorder: Cucujiformia
- Family: Coccinellidae
- Genus: Curticornis
- Species: C. monnei

Binomial name
- Curticornis monnei Duarte-de-Mélo & Churata-Salcedo, 2026

Synonyms
- Pentilia dispar Kirsch, 1876

= Curticornis monnei =

Species of beetle

Curticornis monnei is a species of beetle of the family Coccinellidae. It is found in Brazil (São Paulo).

== Description ==
Adults reach a length of about 3.46 mm (0.136 in). The dorsal surface is completely dark, with a greenish iridescence. The antennae, mouthparts, tibiae, tarsus, and apical ventrites are yellowish and the rest of the body is brownish.

== Etymology ==
The species is named after Miguel Angel Monné Barrios, an entomologist who worked at the Museu Nacional da Universidade Federal do Rio de Janeiro (MNRJ).
