= Calloeneis johnnie =

Scientific classification
- Kingdom: Animalia
- Phylum: Arthropoda
- Clade: Pancrustacea
- Class: Insecta
- Order: Coleoptera
- Suborder: Polyphaga
- Infraorder: Cucujiformia
- Family: Coccinellidae
- Genus: Calloeneis
- Species: C. johnnie

Binomial name
- Calloeneis johnnie Gordon & Hanley, 2020

Species of beetle

Calloeneis johnnie is a species of beetle of the family Coccinellidae. It is found in Trinidad.

== Description ==
Adults reach a length of about 1.7–1.8 mm. They have a reddish brown body and a yellow head. The lateral one third of the pronotum is yellow, while the median one-third is brown. The elytron is reddish brown medially, while the anterior and lateral borders are dark brown.
