= Pentilia nichole =

Scientific classification
- Kingdom: Animalia
- Phylum: Arthropoda
- Class: Insecta
- Order: Coleoptera
- Suborder: Polyphaga
- Infraorder: Cucujiformia
- Family: Coccinellidae
- Genus: Pentilia
- Species: P. nichole

Binomial name
- Pentilia nichole Gordon & González, 2019

Species of beetle

Pentilia nichole is a species of beetle of the family Coccinellidae. It is found in Brazil.

== Description ==
Adults reach a length of about 2-2.4 mm. Adults are black. The lateral and apical one-fourth of the pronotum is yellow and the elytron has a yellow lateral margin and an oval spot.
