= Calloeneis angelica =

Scientific classification
- Kingdom: Animalia
- Phylum: Arthropoda
- Clade: Pancrustacea
- Class: Insecta
- Order: Coleoptera
- Suborder: Polyphaga
- Infraorder: Cucujiformia
- Family: Coccinellidae
- Genus: Calloeneis
- Species: C. angelica

Binomial name
- Calloeneis angelica Gordon & Hanley, 2020

Species of beetle

Calloeneis angelica is a species of beetle of the family Coccinellidae. It is found in Colombia.

== Description ==
Adults reach a length of about 2 mm. They have a yellow body, the head with a small brown marking. The elytron has a small dark brown marking.
