= Pentilia estelle =

Scientific classification
- Kingdom: Animalia
- Phylum: Arthropoda
- Class: Insecta
- Order: Coleoptera
- Suborder: Polyphaga
- Infraorder: Cucujiformia
- Family: Coccinellidae
- Genus: Pentilia
- Species: P. estelle

Binomial name
- Pentilia estelle Gordon & González, 2019

Species of beetle

Pentilia estelle is a species of beetle of the family Coccinellidae. It is found in Trinidad.

== Description ==
Adults reach a length of about 1.9–2.2 mm. Adults are black with a yellow head with some brown markings. The pronotum is yellow with a small brown spot. The lateral margin of the elytron is faintly blackish red.
