= Pentilia =

Scientific classification
- Kingdom: Animalia
- Phylum: Arthropoda
- Clade: Pancrustacea
- Class: Insecta
- Order: Coleoptera
- Suborder: Polyphaga
- Infraorder: Cucujiformia
- Family: Coccinellidae
- Subfamily: Coccinellinae
- Tribe: Cryptognathini
- Genus: Pentilia; Mulsant, 1850

Genus of beetles

Pentilia is a genus of lady beetles in the family Coccinellidae.

== Species ==
- Pentilia bernadette
- Pentilia castanea
- Pentilia chelsea
- Pentilia cincta
- Pentilia convexa
- Pentilia dianna
- Pentilia discors
- Pentilia egena
- Pentilia elena
- Pentilia ernestine
- Pentilia estelle
- Pentilia insidiosa
- Pentilia jasmine
- Pentilia jody
- Pentilia kari
- Pentilia kendra
- Pentilia krystal
- Pentilia lora
- Pentilia mable
- Pentilia muriel
- Pentilia nadine
- Pentilia nichole
- Pentilia nigella
- Pentilia paulette
- Pentilia rachael
- Pentilia sadie
- Pentilia traci
