= Calloeneis =

Scientific classification
- Kingdom: Animalia
- Phylum: Arthropoda
- Clade: Pancrustacea
- Class: Insecta
- Order: Coleoptera
- Suborder: Polyphaga
- Infraorder: Cucujiformia
- Family: Coccinellidae
- Subfamily: Coccinellinae
- Tribe: Cryptognathini
- Genus: Calloeneis; Grote, 1873

Synonyms
- Oeneis Mulsant, 1850 (preocc.); Dargo Chapin, 1955; Delphastopsis Casey, 1924

Genus of beetles

Calloeneis is a genus of lady beetles in the family Coccinellidae.

== Species ==
- Calloeneis amazonica (Casey, 1924)
- Calloeneis nigrans (Mulsant, 1850)
- Calloeneis tumidiventris (Champion, 1913)
- Calloeneis obscura (Mulsant, 1850)
- Calloeneis pauperula (Gorham, 1899)
- Calloeneis veraguas González & Větrovec, 2021
- Calloeneis lynne Gordon & Hanley, 2020
- Calloeneis sheri Gordon & Hanley, 2020
- Calloeneis marianne Gordon & Hanley, 2020
- Calloeneis kara Gordon & Hanley, 2020
- Calloeneis jacquelyn Gordon & Hanley, 2020
- Calloeneis blanca Gordon & Hanley, 2020
- Calloeneis myra Gordon & Hanley, 2020
- Calloeneis leticia Gordon & Hanley, 2020
- Calloeneis signata (Korschefsky, 1936)
- Calloeneis krista Gordon & Hanley, 2020
- Calloeneis roxanne Gordon & Hanley, 2020
- Calloeneis angelica Gordon & Hanley, 2020
- Calloeneis johnnie Gordon & Hanley, 2020
- Calloeneis robyn Gordon & Hanley, 2020
- Calloeneis francis Gordon & Hanley, 2020
- Calloeneis appropinquans (Crotch, 1874)
- Calloeneis rosalie Gordon & Hanley, 2020
- Calloeneis bennetti Gordon, 1978
- Calloeneis alexandra Gordon & Hanley, 2020
- Calloeneis brooke Gordon & Hanley, 2020
- Calloeneis bethany Gordon & Hanley, 2020
