= Curticornis =

Scientific classification
- Kingdom: Animalia
- Phylum: Arthropoda
- Clade: Pancrustacea
- Class: Insecta
- Order: Coleoptera
- Suborder: Polyphaga
- Infraorder: Cucujiformia
- Family: Coccinellidae
- Subfamily: Coccinellinae
- Tribe: Cryptognathini
- Genus: Curticornis; Gordon, 1971

Genus of beetles

Curticornis is a genus of lady beetles in the family Coccinellidae.

== Species ==
- Curticornis annulata (Gorham, 1899)
- Curticornis bicolor Gordon, 1971
- Curticornis dispar (Kirsch, 1876)
- Curticornis manni Gordon, 1971
- Curticornis monnei Duarte-de-Mélo & Churata-Salcedo, 2026
- Curticornis satipensis Gordon, 1971
