= Calloeneis francis =

Scientific classification
- Kingdom: Animalia
- Phylum: Arthropoda
- Clade: Pancrustacea
- Class: Insecta
- Order: Coleoptera
- Suborder: Polyphaga
- Infraorder: Cucujiformia
- Family: Coccinellidae
- Genus: Calloeneis
- Species: C. francis

Binomial name
- Calloeneis francis Gordon & Hanley, 2020

Species of beetle

Calloeneis francis is a species of beetle of the family Coccinellidae. It is found in Peru.

== Description ==
Adults reach a length of about 1.6–2.1 mm. They have a reddish brown body and a yellow head and pronotum. The elytron has a large rounded black marking.
