= Calloeneis brooke =

Scientific classification
- Kingdom: Animalia
- Phylum: Arthropoda
- Clade: Pancrustacea
- Class: Insecta
- Order: Coleoptera
- Suborder: Polyphaga
- Infraorder: Cucujiformia
- Family: Coccinellidae
- Genus: Calloeneis
- Species: C. brooke

Binomial name
- Calloeneis brooke Gordon & Hanley, 2020

Species of beetle

Calloeneis brooke is a species of beetle of the family Coccinellidae. It is found in Venezuela.

== Description ==
Adults reach a length of about 1.6 mm. They have a black body and a yellow head and pronotum.
