= Calloeneis sheri =

Scientific classification
- Kingdom: Animalia
- Phylum: Arthropoda
- Clade: Pancrustacea
- Class: Insecta
- Order: Coleoptera
- Suborder: Polyphaga
- Infraorder: Cucujiformia
- Family: Coccinellidae
- Genus: Calloeneis
- Species: C. sheri

Binomial name
- Calloeneis sheri Gordon & Hanley, 2020

Species of beetle

Calloeneis sheri is a species of beetle of the family Coccinellidae. It is found in Bolivia.

== Description ==
Adults reach a length of about 1.6 mm. They have a yellowish brown body, while the head and abdomen are yellow. The pronotum is light reddish yellow. The elytron is yellowish brown, becoming darker in the lateral one-fourth.
