= Pentilia lora =

Scientific classification
- Kingdom: Animalia
- Phylum: Arthropoda
- Class: Insecta
- Order: Coleoptera
- Suborder: Polyphaga
- Infraorder: Cucujiformia
- Family: Coccinellidae
- Genus: Pentilia
- Species: P. lora

Binomial name
- Pentilia lora Gordon & González, 2019

Species of beetle

Pentilia lora is a species of beetle of the family Coccinellidae. It is found in Suriname.

== Description ==
Adults reach a length of about 1.9–2.2 mm. Adults are black with a yellow head. The pronotum is yellow and the elytron has a small yellow basal spot.
