= Calloeneis bennetti =

Scientific classification
- Kingdom: Animalia
- Phylum: Arthropoda
- Clade: Pancrustacea
- Class: Insecta
- Order: Coleoptera
- Suborder: Polyphaga
- Infraorder: Cucujiformia
- Family: Coccinellidae
- Genus: Calloeneis
- Species: C. bennetti

Binomial name
- Calloeneis bennetti Gordon, 1978

Species of beetle

Calloeneis bennetti is a species of beetle of the family Coccinellidae. It is found in Trinidad.

== Description ==
Adults reach a length of about 1.5–1.7 mm. They have a black body, the head with dark brown and yellowish brown areas.
