= Pentilia egena =

Scientific classification
- Kingdom: Animalia
- Phylum: Arthropoda
- Class: Insecta
- Order: Coleoptera
- Suborder: Polyphaga
- Infraorder: Cucujiformia
- Family: Coccinellidae
- Genus: Pentilia
- Species: P. egena

Binomial name
- Pentilia egena Mulsant, 1850

Synonyms
- Exochomus minutus Kraatz, 1873

Species of beetle

Pentilia egena is a species of beetle of the family Coccinellidae. It is found in Argentina, Brazil, Ecuador, Peru and Venezuela.

== Description ==
Adults reach a length of about 2.1–2.6 mm. Adults are black with a yellow head with some black markings. The lateral one-fourth of the pronotum is yellow.
