= Cryptognathini =

Scientific classification
- Kingdom: Animalia
- Phylum: Arthropoda
- Class: Insecta
- Order: Coleoptera
- Suborder: Polyphaga
- Infraorder: Cucujiformia
- Family: Coccinellidae
- Subfamily: Coccinellinae
- Tribe: Cryptognathini; Mulsant, 1850

Synonyms
- Pentiliini Mulsant, 1850

Tribe of beetles

The Cryptognathini are a tribe of insects within the family Coccinellidae.

== Genera ==
- Calloeneis
- Cryptognatha
- Curticornis
- Pentilia
