= Pentilia elena =

Scientific classification
- Kingdom: Animalia
- Phylum: Arthropoda
- Class: Insecta
- Order: Coleoptera
- Suborder: Polyphaga
- Infraorder: Cucujiformia
- Family: Coccinellidae
- Genus: Pentilia
- Species: P. elena

Binomial name
- Pentilia elena Gordon & González, 2019

Species of beetle

Pentilia elena is a species of beetle of the family Coccinellidae. It is found in Brazil.

== Description ==
Adults reach a length of about 2-2.4 mm. Adults are yellow. The lateral one-third of the pronotum is yellow and the elytron has a dark brown sutural margin and a dark brown vitta in the lateral half.
