= Calloeneis veraguas =

Scientific classification
- Kingdom: Animalia
- Phylum: Arthropoda
- Clade: Pancrustacea
- Class: Insecta
- Order: Coleoptera
- Suborder: Polyphaga
- Infraorder: Cucujiformia
- Family: Coccinellidae
- Genus: Calloeneis
- Species: C. veraguas

Binomial name
- Calloeneis veraguas González & Větrovec, 2021

Species of beetle

Calloeneis veraguas is a species of beetle of the family Coccinellidae. It is found in Panama (Veraguas).

== Description ==
Adults reach a length of about 1.7 mm (0.067 in). The head is yellow and the antennae yellowish brown. The pronotum is black, with the lateral one-third and anterior border yellow. The scutellum is black, and the elytra are black and shiny, with a red discal spot. The ventral surface is mostly black and the abdomen is dark brown. The legs are yellowish brown.

== Etymology ==
The species is named after the province of Veraguas, Panama, where the holotype was collected.
