= Pentilia mable =

Scientific classification
- Kingdom: Animalia
- Phylum: Arthropoda
- Class: Insecta
- Order: Coleoptera
- Suborder: Polyphaga
- Infraorder: Cucujiformia
- Family: Coccinellidae
- Genus: Pentilia
- Species: P. mable

Binomial name
- Pentilia mable Gordon & González, 2019

Species of beetle

Pentilia mable is a species of beetle of the family Coccinellidae. It is found in Colombia.

== Description ==
Adults reach a length of about 2-2.2 mm. Adults are yellow with a reddish brown head. The lateral one-fourth of the pronotum is yellow and the elytron has a dark brown border.
