= Calloeneis amazonica =

Scientific classification
- Kingdom: Animalia
- Phylum: Arthropoda
- Clade: Pancrustacea
- Class: Insecta
- Order: Coleoptera
- Suborder: Polyphaga
- Infraorder: Cucujiformia
- Family: Coccinellidae
- Genus: Calloeneis
- Species: C. amazonica

Binomial name
- Calloeneis amazonica (Casey, 1924)

Synonyms
- Delphastopsis amazonica Casey, 1924

Species of beetle

Calloeneis amazonica is a species of beetle of the family Coccinellidae. It is found in Brazil and Trinidad.
