= Pentilia kendra =

Scientific classification
- Kingdom: Animalia
- Phylum: Arthropoda
- Class: Insecta
- Order: Coleoptera
- Suborder: Polyphaga
- Infraorder: Cucujiformia
- Family: Coccinellidae
- Genus: Pentilia
- Species: P. kendra

Binomial name
- Pentilia kendra Gordon & González, 2019

Species of beetle

Pentilia kendra is a species of beetle of the family Coccinellidae. It is found in Brazil.

== Description ==
Adults reach a length of about 2-2.6 mm. Adults are yellow. The lateral one-fourth of the pronotum is yellow, while the medial area is brown. The elytron is brownish yellow with yellow lateral and sutural margins and a brown vitta.
