= Curticornis annulata =

Scientific classification
- Kingdom: Animalia
- Phylum: Arthropoda
- Clade: Pancrustacea
- Class: Insecta
- Order: Coleoptera
- Suborder: Polyphaga
- Infraorder: Cucujiformia
- Family: Coccinellidae
- Genus: Curticornis
- Species: C. annulata

Binomial name
- Curticornis annulata (Gorham, 1899)

Synonyms
- Cryptognatha annulata Gorham, 1899

Species of beetle

Curticornis annulata is a species of beetle of the family Coccinellidae. It is found in Panama.

== Description ==
Adults reach a length of about 2.75 mm (0.108 in). They have an orbiculate, nearly hemispherical, very shining body. The underside of the body, the head (except at the base), the deflexed angles of the thorax, and the legs are yellow. The thorax is very distinctly and thickly punctured, black, with a brassy tint, its base with a fine marginal line. The elytra are convex, distinctly punctured and the disc is deep chestnut or blood-red, this colour reaching the base. From the basal angles runs a broad black band along the margin, but leaving it at halfway, the two bands joined at the suture, and leaving the apical margin red.
