= Calloeneis marianne =

Scientific classification
- Kingdom: Animalia
- Phylum: Arthropoda
- Clade: Pancrustacea
- Class: Insecta
- Order: Coleoptera
- Suborder: Polyphaga
- Infraorder: Cucujiformia
- Family: Coccinellidae
- Genus: Calloeneis
- Species: C. marianne

Binomial name
- Calloeneis marianne Gordon & Hanley, 2020

Species of beetle

Calloeneis marianne is a species of beetle of the family Coccinellidae. It is found in Paraguay.

== Description ==
Adults reach a length of about 1.6 mm. They have a yellow body, the head with a brown marking. The median two-third of the pronotum is slightly darker yellow than the lateral one-third. The elytron has a small triangular marking.
