= Calloeneis jacquelyn =

Scientific classification
- Kingdom: Animalia
- Phylum: Arthropoda
- Clade: Pancrustacea
- Class: Insecta
- Order: Coleoptera
- Suborder: Polyphaga
- Infraorder: Cucujiformia
- Family: Coccinellidae
- Genus: Calloeneis
- Species: C. jacquelyn

Binomial name
- Calloeneis jacquelyn Gordon & Hanley, 2020

Species of beetle

Calloeneis jacquelyn is a species of beetle of the family Coccinellidae. It is found in Trinidad.

== Description ==
Adults reach a length of about 1.5–1.8 mm. They have a yellow body. The pronotum is dark brown with the lateral one-third yellow. The elytron is slightly darker yellow with a large dark brown marking.
