= Pentilia kari =

Scientific classification
- Kingdom: Animalia
- Phylum: Arthropoda
- Class: Insecta
- Order: Coleoptera
- Suborder: Polyphaga
- Infraorder: Cucujiformia
- Family: Coccinellidae
- Genus: Pentilia
- Species: P. kari

Binomial name
- Pentilia kari Gordon & González, 2019

Species of beetle

Pentilia kari is a species of beetle of the family Coccinellidae. It is found in Colombia.

== Description ==
Adults reach a length of about 1.8–2.2 mm. Adults are black with a yellow head with some brown markings. The lateral one-third and anterior one-third of the pronotum are yellow.
