= Calloeneis kara =

Scientific classification
- Kingdom: Animalia
- Phylum: Arthropoda
- Clade: Pancrustacea
- Class: Insecta
- Order: Coleoptera
- Suborder: Polyphaga
- Infraorder: Cucujiformia
- Family: Coccinellidae
- Genus: Calloeneis
- Species: C. kara

Binomial name
- Calloeneis kara Gordon & Hanley, 2020

Species of beetle

Calloeneis kara is a species of beetle of the family Coccinellidae. It is found in Brazil.

== Description ==
Adults reach a length of about 2.5 mm. They have a yellow body. The elytron has a large triangular marking.
