= Curticornis bicolor =

Scientific classification
- Kingdom: Animalia
- Phylum: Arthropoda
- Clade: Pancrustacea
- Class: Insecta
- Order: Coleoptera
- Suborder: Polyphaga
- Infraorder: Cucujiformia
- Family: Coccinellidae
- Genus: Curticornis
- Species: C. bicolor

Binomial name
- Curticornis bicolor Gordon, 1971

Species of beetle

Curticornis bicolor is a species of beetle of the family Coccinellidae. It is found in Peru.

== Description ==
Adults reach a length of more than 2.1 mm (0.083 in). The dorsal colour is rufous, except for the black discal area of the elytra. The punctures on the elytra are slightly larger than the pronotal punctures.
