= Curticornis satipensis =

Scientific classification
- Kingdom: Animalia
- Phylum: Arthropoda
- Clade: Pancrustacea
- Class: Insecta
- Order: Coleoptera
- Suborder: Polyphaga
- Infraorder: Cucujiformia
- Family: Coccinellidae
- Genus: Curticornis
- Species: C. satipensis

Binomial name
- Curticornis satipensis Gordon, 1971

Species of beetle

Curticornis satipensis is a species of beetle of the family Coccinellidae. It is found in Peru.

== Description ==
Adults reach a length of more than 2.1 mm (0.083 in). The dorsal colour is black, except the head, the anterior angles of the pronotum and the apex of the elytra, which are pale reddish or yellowish.
