= Pentilia bernadette =

Scientific classification
- Kingdom: Animalia
- Phylum: Arthropoda
- Class: Insecta
- Order: Coleoptera
- Suborder: Polyphaga
- Infraorder: Cucujiformia
- Family: Coccinellidae
- Genus: Pentilia
- Species: P. bernadette

Binomial name
- Pentilia bernadette Gordon & González, 2019

Species of beetle

Pentilia bernadette is a species of beetle of the family Coccinellidae. It is found in Peru.

== Description ==
Adults reach a length of about 2-2.6 mm. Adults are brownish black with a yellow head. The lateral one-third of the pronotum is yellow and the elytron has a yellow lateral margin.
