= Calloeneis lynne =

Scientific classification
- Kingdom: Animalia
- Phylum: Arthropoda
- Clade: Pancrustacea
- Class: Insecta
- Order: Coleoptera
- Suborder: Polyphaga
- Infraorder: Cucujiformia
- Family: Coccinellidae
- Genus: Calloeneis
- Species: C. lynne

Binomial name
- Calloeneis lynne Gordon & Hanley, 2020

Species of beetle

Calloeneis lynne is a species of beetle of the family Coccinellidae. It is found in Colombia.

== Description ==
Adults reach a length of about 2 mm. They have a light brownish yellow body and yellow head. The median two-third of the pronotum is darker brownish yellow and the pro-, meso-, metasternum are black. There are small punctures on the pronotum and elytron.
