= Pentilia nadine =

Scientific classification
- Kingdom: Animalia
- Phylum: Arthropoda
- Class: Insecta
- Order: Coleoptera
- Suborder: Polyphaga
- Infraorder: Cucujiformia
- Family: Coccinellidae
- Genus: Pentilia
- Species: P. nadine

Binomial name
- Pentilia nadine Gordon & González, 2019

Species of beetle

Pentilia nadine is a species of beetle of the family Coccinellidae. It is found in Trinidad.

== Description ==
Adults reach a length of about 2.7 mm. Adults are dark brown with a yellow head with some brown markings. The lateral one-third and anterior one-third of the pronotum are yellow.
