= Calloeneis appropinquans =

Scientific classification
- Kingdom: Animalia
- Phylum: Arthropoda
- Clade: Pancrustacea
- Class: Insecta
- Order: Coleoptera
- Suborder: Polyphaga
- Infraorder: Cucujiformia
- Family: Coccinellidae
- Genus: Calloeneis
- Species: C. appropinquans

Binomial name
- Calloeneis appropinquans (Crotch, 1874)

Synonyms
- Cryptognatha appropinquans Crotch, 1874

Species of beetle

Calloeneis appropinquans is a species of beetle of the family Coccinellidae. It is found in Brazil.

== Description ==
Adults reach a length of about 1.7 mm. They have a black body and a yellow head. The anterolateral angle of the pronotum is also yellow.
