= Curticornis manni =

Scientific classification
- Kingdom: Animalia
- Phylum: Arthropoda
- Clade: Pancrustacea
- Class: Insecta
- Order: Coleoptera
- Suborder: Polyphaga
- Infraorder: Cucujiformia
- Family: Coccinellidae
- Genus: Curticornis
- Species: C. manni

Binomial name
- Curticornis manni Gordon, 1971

Species of beetle

Curticornis manni is a species of beetle of the family Coccinellidae. It is found in Bolivia.
