= Calloeneis tumidiventris =

Scientific classification
- Kingdom: Animalia
- Phylum: Arthropoda
- Clade: Pancrustacea
- Class: Insecta
- Order: Coleoptera
- Suborder: Polyphaga
- Infraorder: Cucujiformia
- Family: Coccinellidae
- Genus: Calloeneis
- Species: C. tumidiventris

Binomial name
- Calloeneis tumidiventris (Champion, 1913)

Synonyms
- Cryptognatha tumidiventris Champion, 1913

Species of beetle

Calloeneis tumidiventris is a species of beetle of the family Coccinellidae. It is found in Panama.

== Description ==
Adults reach a length of about 1.5–1.75 mm (0.059–0.069 in). They have a hemispherical, very convex, shining and glabrous body. They are black, but the antennae, coxae and legs (and sometimes also the head and a patch at the anterior angles of the thorax) are testaceous. The ventral segments are rufous. The head and thorax are closely, but the elytra very sparsely punctulate. The elytra are also finely margined.
