= Pentilia muriel =

Scientific classification
- Kingdom: Animalia
- Phylum: Arthropoda
- Class: Insecta
- Order: Coleoptera
- Suborder: Polyphaga
- Infraorder: Cucujiformia
- Family: Coccinellidae
- Genus: Pentilia
- Species: P. muriel

Binomial name
- Pentilia muriel Gordon & González, 2019

Species of beetle

Pentilia muriel is a species of beetle of the family Coccinellidae. It is found in Colombia.

== Description ==
Adults reach a length of about 2.3 mm. Adults are yellow, the head with a black area. The lateral one-third of the pronotum is yellow and the elytron has a black border.
