= Calloeneis myra =

Scientific classification
- Kingdom: Animalia
- Phylum: Arthropoda
- Clade: Pancrustacea
- Class: Insecta
- Order: Coleoptera
- Suborder: Polyphaga
- Infraorder: Cucujiformia
- Family: Coccinellidae
- Genus: Calloeneis
- Species: C. myra

Binomial name
- Calloeneis myra Gordon & Hanley, 2020

Species of beetle

Calloeneis myra is a species of beetle of the family Coccinellidae. It is found in Venezuela.

== Description ==
Adults reach a length of about 2.1 mm. They have a yellow body, the head with a small brown marking in the shape of an hourglass. The pronotum has a small triangular brown marking and a small dark brown marking. The elytron has four dark brown markings.
