= Curticornis dispar =

Scientific classification
- Kingdom: Animalia
- Phylum: Arthropoda
- Clade: Pancrustacea
- Class: Insecta
- Order: Coleoptera
- Suborder: Polyphaga
- Infraorder: Cucujiformia
- Family: Coccinellidae
- Genus: Curticornis
- Species: C. dispar

Binomial name
- Curticornis dispar (Kirsch, 1876)

Synonyms
- Pentilia dispar Kirsch, 1876

Species of beetle

Curticornis dispar is a species of beetle of the family Coccinellidae. It is found in Peru.

== Description ==
Adults reach a length of more than 2.1 mm (0.083 in). The dorsal colour is completely black, with some iridescence. Males have a reddish head.
