= Calloeneis rosalie =

Scientific classification
- Kingdom: Animalia
- Phylum: Arthropoda
- Clade: Pancrustacea
- Class: Insecta
- Order: Coleoptera
- Suborder: Polyphaga
- Infraorder: Cucujiformia
- Family: Coccinellidae
- Genus: Calloeneis
- Species: C. rosalie

Binomial name
- Calloeneis rosalie Gordon & Hanley, 2020

Species of beetle

Calloeneis rosalie is a species of beetle of the family Coccinellidae. It is found in Brazil.

== Description ==
Adults reach a length of about 1.8 mm. They have a black body and a yellowish brown head. The lateral one-fourth of the pronotum is yellow.
