= Pentilia jody =

Scientific classification
- Kingdom: Animalia
- Phylum: Arthropoda
- Class: Insecta
- Order: Coleoptera
- Suborder: Polyphaga
- Infraorder: Cucujiformia
- Family: Coccinellidae
- Genus: Pentilia
- Species: P. jody

Binomial name
- Pentilia jody Gordon & González, 2019

Species of beetle

Pentilia jody is a species of beetle of the family Coccinellidae. It is found in Peru.

== Description ==
Adults reach a length of about 2.3–2.5 mm. Adults are black with a yellow head. The lateral one-fourth of the pronotum is yellow and the elytron is reddish yellow with a dark brown lateral margin.
