= Calloeneis blanca =

Scientific classification
- Kingdom: Animalia
- Phylum: Arthropoda
- Clade: Pancrustacea
- Class: Insecta
- Order: Coleoptera
- Suborder: Polyphaga
- Infraorder: Cucujiformia
- Family: Coccinellidae
- Genus: Calloeneis
- Species: C. blanca

Binomial name
- Calloeneis blanca Gordon & Hanley, 2020

Species of beetle

Calloeneis blanca is a species of beetle of the family Coccinellidae. It is found in Peru.

== Description ==
Adults reach a length of about 2 mm. They have a brownish yellow body and a yellow head. The pronotum has a small faint brown marking, as well as a dark brown marking. The elytron has two large black markings.
