= Pentilia jasmine =

Scientific classification
- Kingdom: Animalia
- Phylum: Arthropoda
- Class: Insecta
- Order: Coleoptera
- Suborder: Polyphaga
- Infraorder: Cucujiformia
- Family: Coccinellidae
- Genus: Pentilia
- Species: P. jasmine

Binomial name
- Pentilia jasmine Gordon & González, 2019

Species of beetle

Pentilia jasmine is a species of beetle of the family Coccinellidae. It is found in Colombia.

== Description ==
Adults reach a length of about 2.2–2.6 mm. Adults are black with a yellow head. The lateral one-third of the pronotum is yellow. The elytron has two large yellow spots.
