= Pentilia krystal =

Scientific classification
- Kingdom: Animalia
- Phylum: Arthropoda
- Class: Insecta
- Order: Coleoptera
- Suborder: Polyphaga
- Infraorder: Cucujiformia
- Family: Coccinellidae
- Genus: Pentilia
- Species: P. krystal

Binomial name
- Pentilia krystal Gordon & González, 2019

Species of beetle

Pentilia krystal is a species of beetle of the family Coccinellidae. It is found in Colombia.

== Description ==
Adults reach a length of about 2.6 mm. Adults are black with a yellow head. The pronotum is reddish yellow with a brownish red spot and the elytron has reddish yellow vitta.
