= Pentilia rachael =

Scientific classification
- Kingdom: Animalia
- Phylum: Arthropoda
- Class: Insecta
- Order: Coleoptera
- Suborder: Polyphaga
- Infraorder: Cucujiformia
- Family: Coccinellidae
- Genus: Pentilia
- Species: P. rachael

Binomial name
- Pentilia rachael Gordon & González, 2019

Species of beetle

Pentilia rachael is a species of beetle of the family Coccinellidae. It is found in Colombia.

== Description ==
Adults reach a length of about 2-2.4 mm. Adults are yellow, the head with a dark brown area. The lateral three-eight and the apical one-fourth of the pronotum is yellow. The elytron is black with four large yellow spots.
