= Heterocaria cinerea =

Scientific classification
- Kingdom: Animalia
- Phylum: Arthropoda
- Clade: Pancrustacea
- Class: Insecta
- Order: Coleoptera
- Suborder: Polyphaga
- Infraorder: Cucujiformia
- Family: Coccinellidae
- Genus: Heterocaria
- Species: H. cinerea

Binomial name
- Heterocaria cinerea (Chazeau, 1990)

Synonyms
- Lemnia kaszabi cinerea Chazeau, 1990

Species of beetle

Heterocaria cinerea is a species of beetle of the family Coccinellidae. It is found in Indonesia (Western New Guinea) and Papua New Guinea.

== Description ==
Adults reach a length of about 3.9–4.7 mm (0.15–0.19 in). The frons and antennae are yellow. The pronotum is yellow, sometimes with a trapezoidal black area. The scutellum is black and the elytra have a silvery brown pattern of punctures on a lighter background, but may sometimes also be uniformly brown or black with yellowish apices and margins.
