= Heterocaria bella =

Scientific classification
- Kingdom: Animalia
- Phylum: Arthropoda
- Clade: Pancrustacea
- Class: Insecta
- Order: Coleoptera
- Suborder: Polyphaga
- Infraorder: Cucujiformia
- Family: Coccinellidae
- Genus: Heterocaria
- Species: H. bella

Binomial name
- Heterocaria bella Ślipiński, Li & Pang, 2020

Species of beetle

Heterocaria bella is a species of beetle of the family Coccinellidae. It is found in Australia (northern Queensland).

== Description ==
Adults reach a length of about 4.2–4.5 mm (0.17–0.18 in). The frons and antennae are yellow and the pronotum is also yellow, but with a black basal border and the a partially black lateral margin. The scutellum is and black and the elytra are also black, but each with nine large yellow spots and with the lateral border and suture black.

== Etymology ==
The species name is derived from Latin bella (meaning beautiful, pretty).
