= Heterocaria =

Scientific classification
- Kingdom: Animalia
- Phylum: Arthropoda
- Clade: Pancrustacea
- Class: Insecta
- Order: Coleoptera
- Suborder: Polyphaga
- Infraorder: Cucujiformia
- Family: Coccinellidae
- Subfamily: Coccinellinae
- Tribe: Coccinellini
- Genus: Heterocaria; Timberlake, 1943

Synonyms
- Oiocaria Iablokoff-Khnzorian, 1982

Genus of beetles

Heterocaria is a genus of beetles belonging to the family Coccinellidae.

== Species ==
- Heterocaria barronensis
- Heterocaria bella
- Heterocaria cinerea
- Heterocaria decemmaculata
- Heterocaria delta
- Heterocaria funerea
- Heterocaria kaszabi
- Heterocaria papuana
- Heterocaria riedeli
- Heterocaria samuelsoni
- Heterocaria transversoguttata
