= Heterocaria papuana =

Scientific classification
- Kingdom: Animalia
- Phylum: Arthropoda
- Clade: Pancrustacea
- Class: Insecta
- Order: Coleoptera
- Suborder: Polyphaga
- Infraorder: Cucujiformia
- Family: Coccinellidae
- Genus: Heterocaria
- Species: H. papuana

Binomial name
- Heterocaria papuana Timberlake, 1943

Species of beetle

Heterocaria papuana is a species of beetle of the family Coccinellidae. It is found in Papua New Guinea.

== Description ==
Adults reach a length of about 5.3–5.5 mm (0.21–0.22 in). The frons and antennae are yellow to orange. The pronotum is orange, with a black basal border medially, while the anterior border is transparent. The scutellum and elytra are black, the latter each with nine yellow spots.
