= Heterocaria delta =

Scientific classification
- Kingdom: Animalia
- Phylum: Arthropoda
- Clade: Pancrustacea
- Class: Insecta
- Order: Coleoptera
- Suborder: Polyphaga
- Infraorder: Cucujiformia
- Family: Coccinellidae
- Genus: Heterocaria
- Species: H. delta

Binomial name
- Heterocaria delta (Weise, 1898)

Synonyms
- Egleis delta Weise, 1898; Archegleis crotchi Iablokoff.Khnzorian, 1984

Species of beetle

Heterocaria delta is a species of beetle of the family Coccinellidae. It is found in Australia (southern Queensland, northern New South Wales).

== Description ==
Adults reach a length of about 6.1–6.7 mm (0.24–0.26 in). The frons and antennae are yellow. The pronotum is yellow with a black base, Y-shaped central marking and lateral margin. The scutellum is black and the elytra are greenish yellow with black stripes and with the border and suture black.
