= Heterocaria kaszabi =

Scientific classification
- Kingdom: Animalia
- Phylum: Arthropoda
- Clade: Pancrustacea
- Class: Insecta
- Order: Coleoptera
- Suborder: Polyphaga
- Infraorder: Cucujiformia
- Family: Coccinellidae
- Genus: Heterocaria
- Species: H. kaszabi

Binomial name
- Heterocaria kaszabi (Iablokoff-Khnzorian, 1982)

Synonyms
- Lemnia kaszabi Iablokoff-Khnzorian, 1982

Species of beetle

Heterocaria kaszabi is a species of beetle of the family Coccinellidae. It is found in Indonesia (Western New Guinea) and Papua New Guinea.

== Description ==
Adults reach a length of about 3.8–4.9 mm (0.15–0.19 in). The frons is yellow or brown and the antennal club is dark. The pronotum has transparent anterior and lateral margins, a yellow disc and black markings medially. The elytra has black cross-like markings and each elytron has two or three yellow areas.
