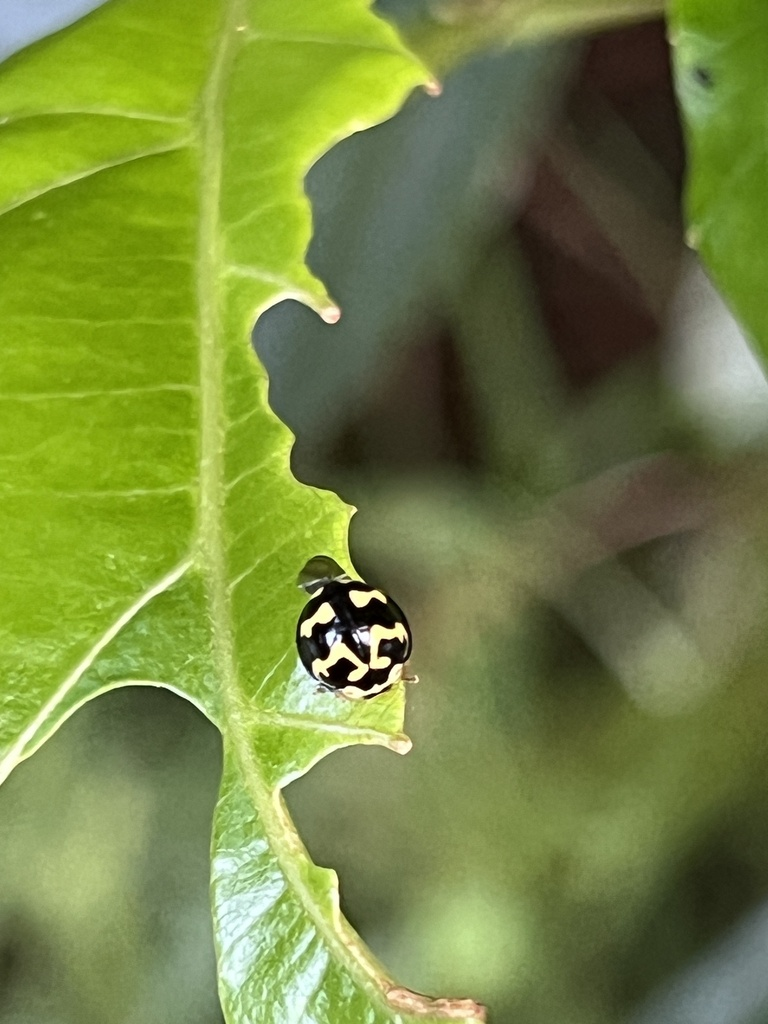

Scientific classification
- Kingdom: Animalia
- Phylum: Arthropoda
- Clade: Pancrustacea
- Class: Insecta
- Order: Coleoptera
- Suborder: Polyphaga
- Infraorder: Cucujiformia
- Family: Coccinellidae
- Genus: Heterocaria
- Species: H. barronensis

Binomial name
- Heterocaria barronensis (Blackburn, 1895)

Synonyms
- Cycloneda barronensis Blackburn, 1895

= Heterocaria barronensis =

Species of beetle

Heterocaria barronensis is a species of beetle of the family Coccinellidae. It is found in Australia (northern Queensland).

== Description ==
Adults reach a length of about 4.7–5.6 mm (0.19–0.22 in). The frons is yellow and the antennae are yellow. The pronotum is also yellow, but with two black markings. The scutellum is black and the elytra are black with three yellow markings on each elytron.
