= Heterocaria funerea =

Scientific classification
- Kingdom: Animalia
- Phylum: Arthropoda
- Clade: Pancrustacea
- Class: Insecta
- Order: Coleoptera
- Suborder: Polyphaga
- Infraorder: Cucujiformia
- Family: Coccinellidae
- Genus: Heterocaria
- Species: H. funerea

Binomial name
- Heterocaria funerea (Crotch, 1874)

Synonyms
- Halyzia funerea Crotch, 1874; Coelophora extensa Weise, 1902; Coelophora extensa var. mysolensis Weise, 1902

Species of beetle

Heterocaria funerea is a species of beetle of the family Coccinellidae. It is found in Indonesia (Western New Guinea) and Papua New Guinea.

== Description ==
Adults reach a length of about 5.4–7 mm (0.21–0.28 in). The frons and antennae are yellow. The colour pattern of the pronotum and elytra is variable, but the latter is always black with orange and red spots.
