= Heterocaria riedeli =

Scientific classification
- Kingdom: Animalia
- Phylum: Arthropoda
- Clade: Pancrustacea
- Class: Insecta
- Order: Coleoptera
- Suborder: Polyphaga
- Infraorder: Cucujiformia
- Family: Coccinellidae
- Genus: Heterocaria
- Species: H. riedeli

Binomial name
- Heterocaria riedeli Ślipiński, Li & Pang, 2020

Species of beetle

Heterocaria riedeli is a species of beetle of the family Coccinellidae. It is found in Indonesia (Western New Guinea) and Papua New Guinea.

== Description ==
Adults reach a length of about 5.1–6.3 mm (0.20–0.25 in). The frons and antennae are yellow, while the pronotum is yellow anteriorly, but with a large medial black area. The scutellum and elytra are black, the latter each with a yellow rectangle, two spots laterally, and with the borders and suture black.

== Etymology ==
The species is named after Alexander Riedel, who first collected the species.
