= Heterocaria decemmaculata =

Scientific classification
- Kingdom: Animalia
- Phylum: Arthropoda
- Clade: Pancrustacea
- Class: Insecta
- Order: Coleoptera
- Suborder: Polyphaga
- Infraorder: Cucujiformia
- Family: Coccinellidae
- Genus: Heterocaria
- Species: H. decemmaculata

Binomial name
- Heterocaria decemmaculata Ślipiński, Li & Pang, 2020

Species of beetle

Heterocaria decemmaculata is a species of beetle of the family Coccinellidae. It is found in Indonesia (Western New Guinea).

== Description ==
Adults reach a length of about 5.2 mm (0.20 in). The frons and antennae are yellow. The pronotum is medially black, with broad yellow areas laterally and the lateral margins are black. The scutellum is black and the elytra are also black, but each with five yellow spots and with the external border and suture black.

== Etymology ==
The species name is derived from Latin decem and refers to the number of elytral spots.
