= Heterocaria transversoguttata =

Scientific classification
- Kingdom: Animalia
- Phylum: Arthropoda
- Clade: Pancrustacea
- Class: Insecta
- Order: Coleoptera
- Suborder: Polyphaga
- Infraorder: Cucujiformia
- Family: Coccinellidae
- Genus: Heterocaria
- Species: H. transversoguttata

Binomial name
- Heterocaria transversoguttata Ślipiński, Li & Pang, 2020

Species of beetle

Heterocaria transversoguttata is a species of beetle of the family Coccinellidae. It is found in Papua New Guinea.

== Description ==
Adults reach a length of about 5 mm (0.20 in). The frons and antennae are yellow, while the pronotum is black with two yellow oval areas and black lateral borders. The scutellum and elytra are black, the latter each with five yellow spots and with the external border and suture black.

== Etymology ==
The species name refers to the transverse, fasciate pattern on the elytra.
