= Heterocaria samuelsoni =

Scientific classification
- Kingdom: Animalia
- Phylum: Arthropoda
- Clade: Pancrustacea
- Class: Insecta
- Order: Coleoptera
- Suborder: Polyphaga
- Infraorder: Cucujiformia
- Family: Coccinellidae
- Genus: Heterocaria
- Species: H. samuelsoni

Binomial name
- Heterocaria samuelsoni (Iablokoff-Khnzorian, 1982)

Synonyms
- Oiocaria samuelsoni Iablokoff-Khnzorian, 1982

Species of beetle

Heterocaria samuelsoni is a species of beetle of the family Coccinellidae. It is found in Papua New Guinea.

== Description ==
Adults reach a length of about 3.8–4.6 mm (0.15–0.18 in). The frons and antennae are yellow, and the pronotum is yellow with a central black marking and partially darkened lateral margins. The scutellum and elytra are black, the latter with yellow humeral fascia and four to five spots.
