= Bulaea =

Scientific classification
- Kingdom: Animalia
- Phylum: Arthropoda
- Clade: Pancrustacea
- Class: Insecta
- Order: Coleoptera
- Suborder: Polyphaga
- Infraorder: Cucujiformia
- Family: Coccinellidae
- Subfamily: Coccinellinae
- Tribe: Coccinellini
- Genus: Bulaea; Mulsant, 1850

Synonyms
- Isora Mulsant, 1850

Genus of beetles

Bulaea is a genus of beetles belonging to the family Coccinellidae.

== Species ==
- Bulaea anceps
- Bulaea lichatschovii
- Bulaea lividula
