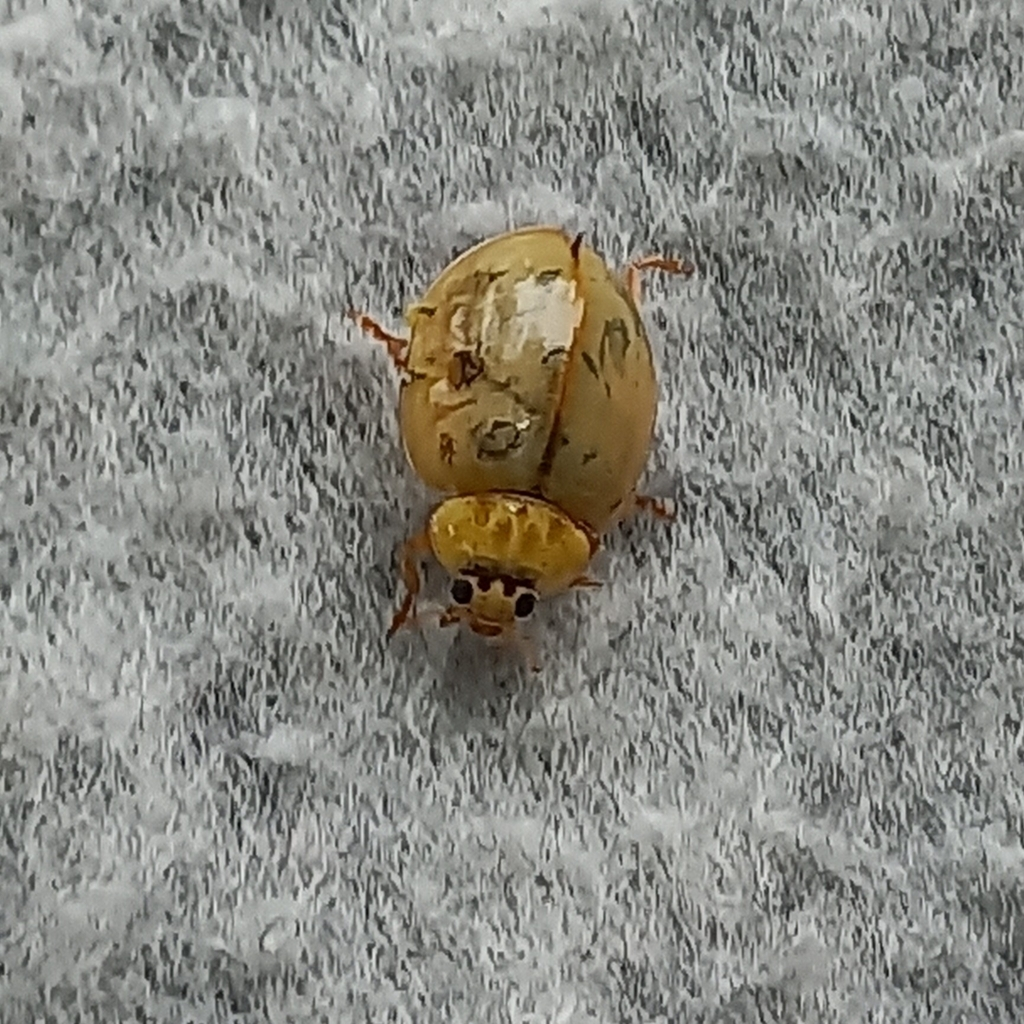
- Bulaea lividula lividula
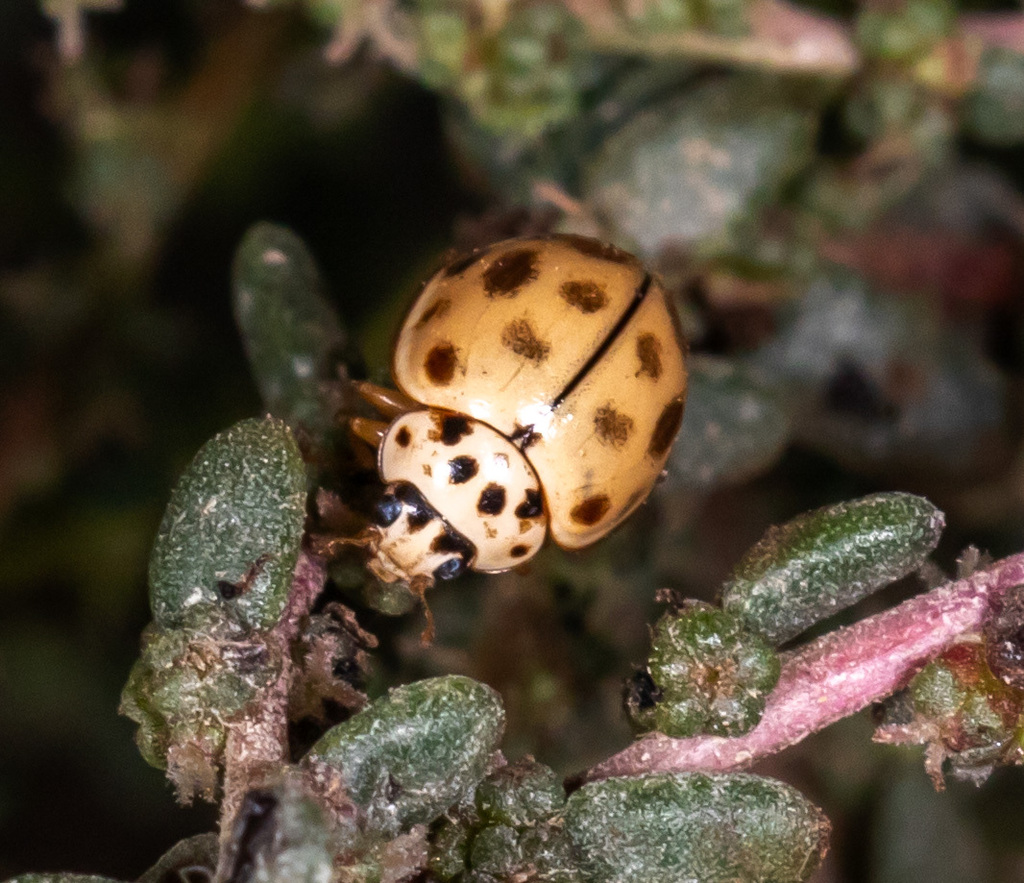
- Bulaea lividula bocandei

Scientific classification
- Kingdom: Animalia
- Phylum: Arthropoda
- Clade: Pancrustacea
- Class: Insecta
- Order: Coleoptera
- Suborder: Polyphaga
- Infraorder: Cucujiformia
- Family: Coccinellidae
- Genus: Bulaea
- Species: B. lividula

Binomial name
- Bulaea lividula Mulsant, 1850

Synonyms
- Coccinella pallida Motschulsky, 1849; Bulaea bocandei Mulsant, 1850; Bulaea pallida Mulsant, 1850; Bulaea flavidula Mulsant, 1866; Bulaea lichatschovii var. suturella Weise, 1885; Thea albiventris Fürsch, 1971

= Bulaea lividula =

Species of beetle

Bulaea lividula is a species of beetle of the family Coccinellidae. It is found in India, Pakistan, Eritrea, United Arab Emirates, Israel, Iraq, Iran, Jordon, Saudi Arabia, Syria, Yemen, Algeria, Egypt, Mauritania and Spain.

== Description ==
Adults reach a length of about 4.6–5.4 mm (0.18–0.21 in). The head is creamy yellow, but black posteriorly. The pronotum is creamy yellow with black maculae and the scutellum is yellow anteriorly, with the borders and apex blackish. The elytra are bright yellow with 19 black spots.

== Subspecies ==
- Bulaea lividula lividula (Spain)
- Bulaea lividula bocandei Mulsant, 1850 (India, Pakistan, Eritrea, United Arab Emirates, Israel, Iraq, Iran, Jordon, Saudi Arabia, Syria, Yemen, Algeria, Egypt, Mauritania)
