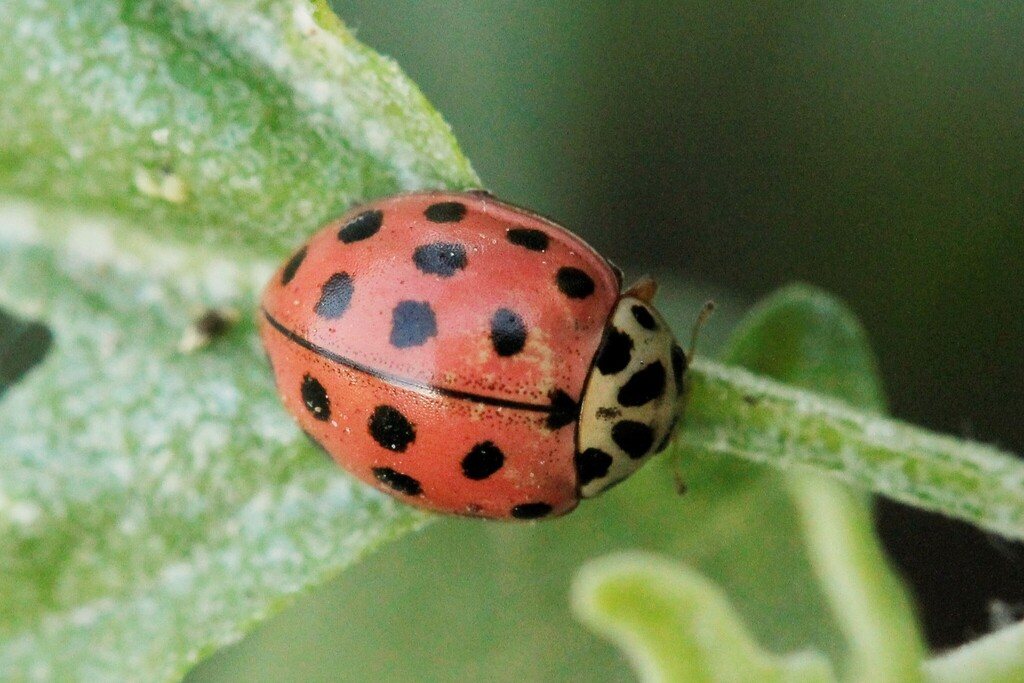

Scientific classification
- Kingdom: Animalia
- Phylum: Arthropoda
- Clade: Pancrustacea
- Class: Insecta
- Order: Coleoptera
- Suborder: Polyphaga
- Infraorder: Cucujiformia
- Family: Coccinellidae
- Genus: Bulaea
- Species: B. lichatschovii

Binomial name
- Bulaea lichatschovii (Hummel, 1827)

Synonyms
- Coccinella lichatschovii Hummel, 1827; Coccinella novemdecimnotata Gebler, 1830; Bulaea flavidula Mulsant, 1850

= Bulaea lichatschovii =

Species of beetle

Bulaea lichatschovii is a species of beetle of the family Coccinellidae. It is found in India (Haryana, Rajasthan, Uttar Pradesh), central and western Asia, Afghanistan, the Mediterranean region and northern and central Africa.

== Description ==
Adults reach a length of about 4.5–5.5 mm (0.18–0.22 in). The head is yellow with a two black spots or one larger black basal macula. The pronotum is yellow with 6–7 black spots and each elytron has nine black spots.
