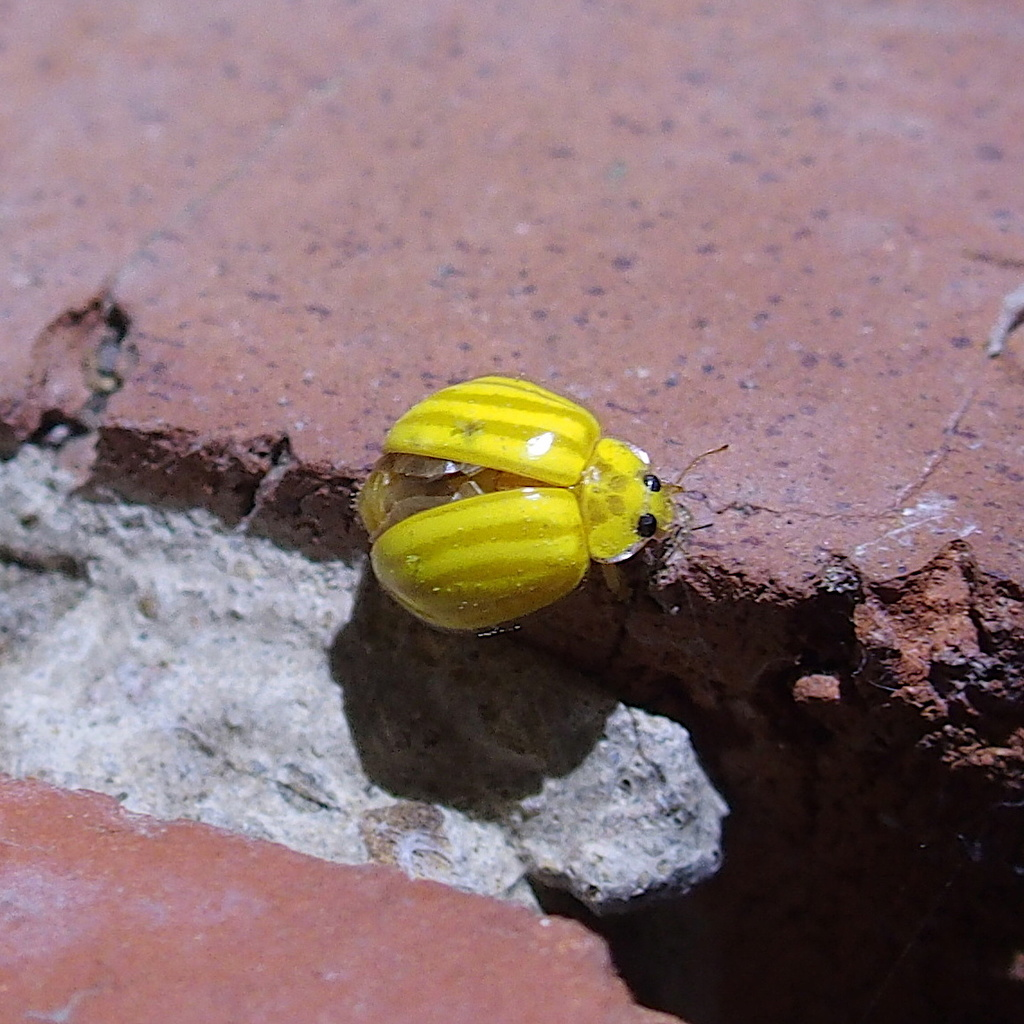

Scientific classification
- Kingdom: Animalia
- Phylum: Arthropoda
- Clade: Pancrustacea
- Class: Insecta
- Order: Coleoptera
- Suborder: Polyphaga
- Infraorder: Cucujiformia
- Family: Coccinellidae
- Genus: Macroilleis
- Species: M. hauseri

Binomial name
- Macroilleis hauseri (Mader, 1930)

Synonyms
- Halyzia hauseri Mader, 1930

= Macroilleis hauseri =

Species of beetle

Macroilleis hauseri is a species of beetle of the family Coccinellidae. It is found in India (Arunachal Pradesh, Meghalaya, Sikkim, West Bengal), Bhutan, Nepal, Pakistan, China, Taiwan, Vietnam and Laos.

== Description ==
Adults reach a length of about 5.5–7.8 mm (0.22–0.31 in). The dorsal surface is yellow, the pronotum with a yellowish brown M-shaped marking. The elytra are bright yellow with four white to paler creamy yellow stripes.

== Life history ==
They probably feed on powdery mildews.
