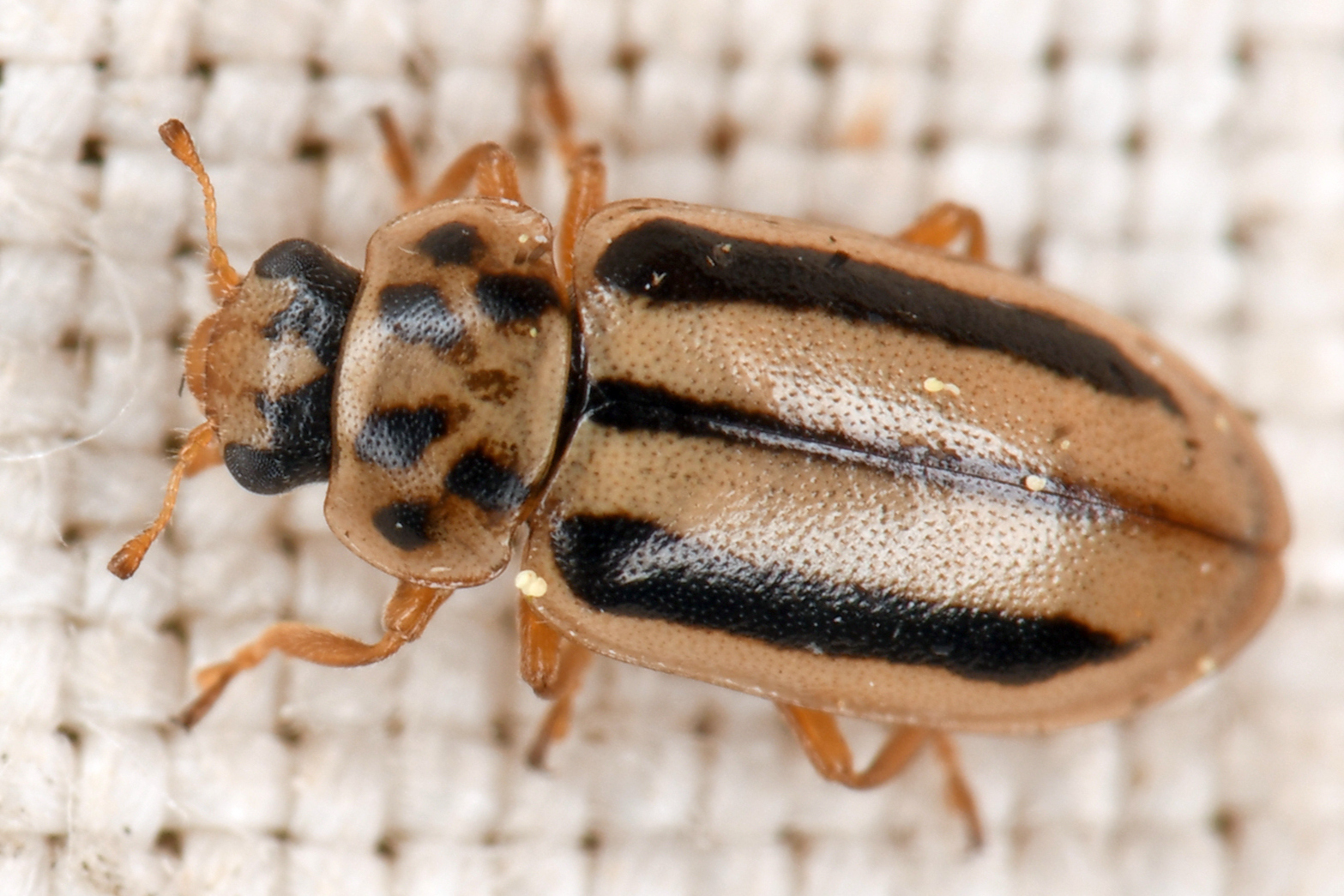

Scientific classification
- Kingdom: Animalia
- Phylum: Arthropoda
- Clade: Pancrustacea
- Class: Insecta
- Order: Coleoptera
- Suborder: Polyphaga
- Infraorder: Cucujiformia
- Family: Coccinellidae
- Genus: Macronaemia
- Species: M. episcopalis

Binomial name
- Macronaemia episcopalis (Kirby, 1837)

Synonyms
- Coccinella episcopalis Kirby, 1837

= Macronaemia episcopalis =

Species of beetle

Macronaemia episcopalis is a species of beetle of the family Coccinellidae. It is found in North America, where it has been recorded from Ontario to New York, west to Yukon and northern California.

== Description ==
Adults reach a length of about 3.25-4 mm. They have a yellow body and a black head. The pronotum has three black spots on each side. The elytron has three black vittae.
