= Telsimia ceylonica =

Scientific classification
- Kingdom: Animalia
- Phylum: Arthropoda
- Class: Insecta
- Order: Coleoptera
- Suborder: Polyphaga
- Infraorder: Cucujiformia
- Family: Coccinellidae
- Genus: Telsimia
- Species: T. ceylonica

Binomial name
- Telsimia ceylonica (Weise, 1900)

Species of beetle

Telsimia ceylonica is a species of lady beetle found in India and Sri Lanka.

It is a predator of several aphids and scale insects that attack coconut and oil palm.
