= Telsimia =

Scientific classification
- Kingdom: Animalia
- Phylum: Arthropoda
- Class: Insecta
- Order: Coleoptera
- Suborder: Polyphaga
- Infraorder: Cucujiformia
- Family: Coccinellidae
- Subfamily: Coccinellinae
- Tribe: Telsimiini
- Genus: Telsimia; Casey, 1899

Genus of beetles

Telsimia is a genus of beetles in the family Coccinellidae. It contains 49 species. Members of this genus are found in Africa, Asia, Micronesia, New Guinea, Australia.

== Species ==
- Telsimia abdita Ślipiński, Pang & Pope, 2005
- Telsimia acaciae Ślipiński, Pang & Pope, 2005
- Telsimia angulata (Blackburn, 1889)
- Telsimia bangalorensis Kapur, 1969
- Telsimia bicolor Kapur, 1969
- Telsimia cassicula Ślipiński, Pang & Pope, 2005
- Telsimia ceylonica (Weise, 1900)
- Telsimia chayuensis Bi, Huo & Wang, 2022
- Telsimia chujoi Miyatake, 1959
- Telsimia crebra (Blackburn, 1895)
- Telsimia daclacensis Hoàng, 1983
- Telsimia darjeelingensis Kapur, 1969
- Telsimia elainae Chazeau, 1984
- Telsimia elongata Hoàng, 1985
- Telsimia emarginata Chapin, 1926
- Telsimia flavomaculata Poorani, 2003
- Telsimia forcipata Bi, Huo & Wang, 2022
- Telsimia gibbosa (Blackburn, 1895)
- Telsimia glorious Ślipiński, Pang & Pope, 2005
- Telsimia huiliensis Pang & Mao, 1979
- Telsimia humidiphila Kapur, 1969
- Telsimia intricata Poorani & Thanigairaj, 2023
- Telsimia ismayi Chazeau, 1984
- Telsimia jinyangiensis Pang & Mao, 1979
- Telsimia kuznetsovi Hoàng, 1987
- Telsimia lata Bi, Huo & Wang, 2022
- Telsimia leucoceps Ślipiński, Pang & Pope, 2005
- Telsimia lobata Bi, Huo & Wang, 2022
- Telsimia lunata Bi, Huo & Wang, 2022
- Telsimia martis (Mulsant, 1853)
- Telsimia menglaensis Bi, Huo & Wang, 2022
- Telsimia mudigerensis Poorani & Thanigairaj, 2023
- Telsimia nagasakiensis Miyatake, 1978
- Telsimia nigra (Weise, 1879)
- Telsimia obscuripes (Lea, 1902)
- Telsimia occidua Ślipiński, Pang & Pope, 2005
- Telsimia palitans Ślipiński, Pang & Pope, 2005
- Telsimia parascymnoides Bi, Huo & Wang, 2022
- Telsimia parvus Bi, Huo & Wang, 2022
- Telsimia postocula Kapur, 1967
- Telsimia pygmaea Poorani & Thanigairaj, 2023
- Telsimia rossi Ślipiński, Pang & Pope, 2005
- Telsimia rotunda Ślipiński, Pang & Pope, 2005
- Telsimia rotundata (Motschulsky, 1859)
- Telsimia scymnoides Miyatake, 1978
- Telsimia shirozui Miyatake, 1965
- Telsimia sichuanensis Pang & Mao, 1979
- Telsimia subviridis (Blackburn, 1892)
- Telsimia tamdaoensis Hoàng, 1981
