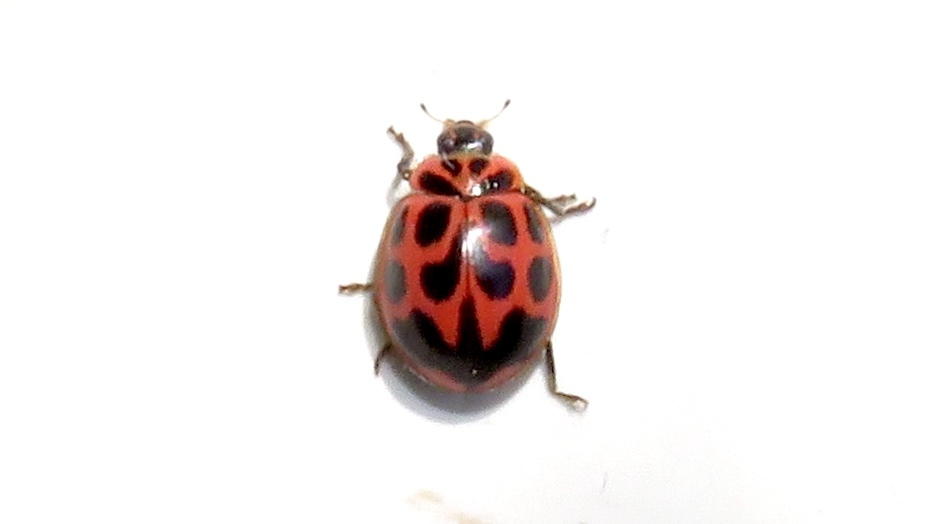

Scientific classification
- Kingdom: Animalia
- Phylum: Arthropoda
- Clade: Pancrustacea
- Class: Insecta
- Order: Coleoptera
- Suborder: Polyphaga
- Infraorder: Cucujiformia
- Family: Coccinellidae
- Genus: Neoharmonia
- Species: N. venusta

Binomial name
- Neoharmonia venusta (Melsheimer, 1847)

Synonyms
- Coccinella venusta Melsheimer, 1847; Harmonia ampla Mulsant, 1850; Harmonia cyanoptera Mulsant, 1850; Harmonia soularyi Mulsant, 1866; Harmonia viridipennis Mulsant, 1866; Harmonia notulata Mulsant, 1850; Neoharmonia venusta var. dissimila Blatchley, 1914; Neoharmonia venusta var. fattigi Blatchley, 1920; Neoharmonia venusta centralis Casey, 1924

= Neoharmonia venusta =

Species of beetle

Neoharmonia venusta is a species of beetle of the family Coccinellidae. It is found in North America, where it has been recorded from Maine to Florida, west to Michigan, Nebraska, Texas, New Mexico and Arizona. It is also found in Mexico.

== Subspecies ==
- Neoharmonia venusta venusta (Maine to Florida, west to Michigan, Nebraska and eastern Texas)
- Neoharmonia venusta ampla (Mulsant, 1850) (Mexico, Arizona, New Mexico, Texas)
