= Protothea decemguttata =

Scientific classification
- Kingdom: Animalia
- Phylum: Arthropoda
- Clade: Pancrustacea
- Class: Insecta
- Order: Coleoptera
- Suborder: Polyphaga
- Infraorder: Cucujiformia
- Family: Coccinellidae
- Genus: Protothea
- Species: P. decemguttata

Binomial name
- Protothea decemguttata (Hoang, 1983)

Synonyms
- Nedina decemguttata Hoang, 1983

Species of beetle

Protothea decemguttata is a species of beetle of the family Coccinellidae. It is found in India (West Bengal, Sikkim) and Vietnam.

== Description ==
Adults reach a length of about 3.2 mm (0.13 in). The dorsal surface is yellowish with ten black spots on the elytra. The underside is also mostly yellowish.
