= Protothea quadripunctata =

Scientific classification
- Kingdom: Animalia
- Phylum: Arthropoda
- Clade: Pancrustacea
- Class: Insecta
- Order: Coleoptera
- Suborder: Polyphaga
- Infraorder: Cucujiformia
- Family: Coccinellidae
- Genus: Protothea
- Species: P. quadripunctata

Binomial name
- Protothea quadripunctata (Mulsant, 1853)

Synonyms
- Thea quadripunctata Mulsant, 1853; Protothea indica Weise, 1910; Nedina mirabilis Hoang, 1984

Species of beetle

Protothea quadripunctata is a species of beetle of the family Coccinellidae. It is found in India (Assam, Nagaland, Sikkim), Vietnam, Thailand and Myanmar.

== Description ==
Adults reach a length of about 2.85–3.25 mm (0.112–0.128 in). The dorsal surface is bright yellow, with the head and pronotum creamy yellow, the latter with an M-shaped pale brown marking and transparent anterior and lateral margins. Each elytron normally has four black spots. The margins of the elytra are also transparent.
