= Protothea (beetle) =

Scientific classification
- Kingdom: Animalia
- Phylum: Arthropoda
- Clade: Pancrustacea
- Class: Insecta
- Order: Coleoptera
- Suborder: Polyphaga
- Infraorder: Cucujiformia
- Family: Coccinellidae
- Subfamily: Coccinellinae
- Tribe: Coccinellini
- Genus: Protothea; Weise, 1898

Synonyms
- Nedina Hoang, 1983

Genus of beetles

Protothea is a genus of beetles belonging to the family Coccinellidae.

== Species ==
- Protothea aurea
- Protothea decemguttata
- Protothea firma
- Protothea flavescens
- Protothea limbata
- Protothea melanaria
- Protothea octoguttata
- Protothea quadripunctata
