= Argosadalia =

Scientific classification
- Kingdom: Animalia
- Phylum: Arthropoda
- Clade: Pancrustacea
- Class: Insecta
- Order: Coleoptera
- Suborder: Polyphaga
- Infraorder: Cucujiformia
- Family: Coccinellidae
- Tribe: Coccinellini
- Genus: Argosadalia; Vandenberg, 2019

Genus of beetles

Argosadalia is a genus of lady beetles in the family Coccinellidae.

== Species ==
- Argosadalia priscilla Vandenberg, 2019
