= Argosadalia priscilla =

Scientific classification
- Kingdom: Animalia
- Phylum: Arthropoda
- Clade: Pancrustacea
- Class: Insecta
- Order: Coleoptera
- Suborder: Polyphaga
- Infraorder: Cucujiformia
- Family: Coccinellidae
- Genus: Argosadalia
- Species: A. priscilla

Binomial name
- Argosadalia priscilla Vandenberg, 2019

Species of beetle

Argosadalia priscilla is a species of beetle of the family Coccinellidae. It is found in Peru, Bolivia and Ecuador.

== Description ==
Adults reach a length of about 3.5–5.2 mm. The head and pronotum are orange, the latter with a small oval dark brown spot. The elytra are nearly black with 32 cream colored spots.

== Etymology ==
The species is named for Priscilla Campbell Vandenberg, the mother of the author.
