= Eoadalia juliae =

Scientific classification
- Kingdom: Animalia
- Phylum: Arthropoda
- Clade: Pancrustacea
- Class: Insecta
- Order: Coleoptera
- Suborder: Polyphaga
- Infraorder: Cucujiformia
- Family: Coccinellidae
- Genus: Eoadalia
- Species: E. juliae

Binomial name
- Eoadalia juliae (Mulsant, 1866)

Synonyms
- Harmonia juliae Mulsant, 1866

Species of beetle

Eoadalia juliae is a species of beetle of the family Coccinellidae. It is found in India (Uttarakhand).

== Description ==
They are yellow. The head has a longitudinal black macula connected to a larger, transverse black macula on the posterior half. The pronotum has a median black macula and the elytra are yellow without any markings.
