= Coleomegilla cubensis =

Scientific classification
- Kingdom: Animalia
- Phylum: Arthropoda
- Clade: Pancrustacea
- Class: Insecta
- Order: Coleoptera
- Suborder: Polyphaga
- Infraorder: Cucujiformia
- Family: Coccinellidae
- Genus: Coleomegilla
- Species: C. cubensis

Binomial name
- Coleomegilla cubensis (Casey, 1908)

Synonyms
- Megilla cubensis Casey, 1908

Species of lady beetle

Coleomegilla cubensis is a species of lady beetle.

== Distribution ==
Coleomegilla cubensis is native to the Caribbean and has been introduced to Hawaii.
