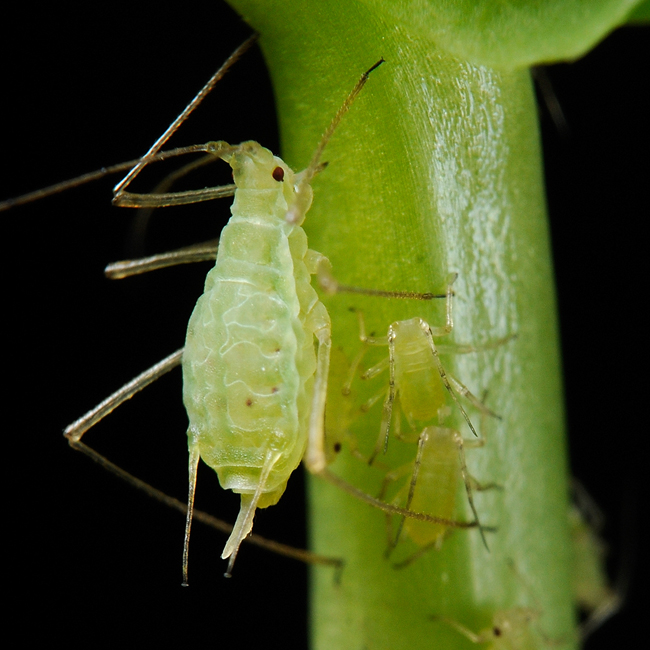
- Adult parthenogenetic pea aphid and progeny feeding on a pea plant

Scientific classification
- Kingdom: Animalia
- Phylum: Arthropoda
- Clade: Pancrustacea
- Class: Insecta
- Order: Hemiptera
- Suborder: Sternorrhyncha
- Family: Aphididae
- Genus: Acyrthosiphon
- Species: A. pisum

Binomial name
- Acyrthosiphon pisum Harris, 1776

Subspecies
- A. pisum pisum (type); A. pisum ononis Koch, 1855; ?A. pisum spartii Koch, 1855; ?A. pisum destructor Johnson, 1900

= Acyrthosiphon pisum =

Species of true bug

Acyrthosiphon pisum, commonly known as the pea aphid (and colloquially known as the green dolphin, pea louse, and clover louse), is a sap-sucking insect in the family Aphididae. It feeds on several species of legumes (plant family Fabaceae) worldwide, including forage crops, such as pea, clover, alfalfa, and broad bean, and ranks among the aphid species of major agronomical importance. The pea aphid is a model organism for biological study whose genome has been sequenced and annotated.

== Generalities and life cycle ==
In the autumn, female pea aphids lay fertilized eggs overwinter that hatch the following spring. The nymphs that hatch from these eggs are all females, which undergo four moults before reaching sexual maturity. They will then begin to reproduce by viviparous parthenogenesis, like most aphids. Each adult female gives birth to four to 12 female nymphs per day, around a hundred in her lifetime. These develop into mature females in about seven to ten days. The life span of an adult is about 30 days.

Population densities are at their highest in early summer, then decrease through predation and parasitism. In autumn, the lengthening of the night triggers the production of a single generation of sexual individuals (males and oviparous females) by the same parthenogenetic parent females. Inseminated sexual females will lay overwintering eggs, from which new parthenogenetic females will emerge in early spring.

When the colony begins to become overcrowded, some winged females are produced. These disperse to infest other plants, where they continue to reproduce asexually. When temperatures become colder and day lengths shorter, sexual winged females and males appear. These mate, the females lay diapausing eggs and the life cycle starts again. Pea aphids can complete their whole reproductive cycle without shifting host plant.

Inbreeding is avoided by the recognition of close kin. Mating between close kin has significantly lower egg hatching success and offspring survival than outbred mating.

Several morphs exist in pea aphids. Besides differences between sexual and parthenogenetic morphs, winged and wingless morphs exist. Overcrowding and poor food quality may trigger the development of winged individuals in subsequent generations. Winged aphids can then colonize other host plants. Pea aphids also show hereditary body color variations of green or red/pink. The green morphs are generally more frequent in natural populations.

Acyrthosiphon pisum is a rather large aphid whose body can reach 4 millimetres (5/32 in) in adults. It generally feeds on the lower sides of leaves, buds and pods of legumes, ingesting phloem sap through its stylets. Unlike many aphid species, pea aphids do not tend to form dense colonies where individuals would stay where they were born during their whole lifetimes. Pea aphids are not known to be farmed by ants that feed on honeydews.

More than 20 legume genera are known to host pea aphids, though the complete host range remains undetermined. On crops such as peas and alfalfa, A. pisum is considered among the aphid species of major agronomical importance. Yields can be affected by the sap intake that directly weakens plants, although pea aphids seldom reach densities that might significantly reduce crop production. However, like many aphid species, A. pisum can be a vector of viral diseases to the plants it visits. Protection against pea aphids includes the use of chemical insecticides, natural predators and parasitoids, and the selection of resistant cultivars. No insecticide resistance is documented in A. pisum, as opposed to many aphid pests.

Pea aphids, although collectively designated by the single scientific name A. pisum, encompass several biotypes described as cryptic species, subspecies or races, which are specialized on different host species. Therefore, the pea aphid is more accurately described as a species complex.

The pea aphid is thought to be of Palearctic origin, but it is now commonly found worldwide under temperate climate. The spread of A. pisum probably resulted from the introduction of some of its host plants for agriculture. Such an introduction likely occurred into North America during the 1870s, and by 1900 it had become a serious pest species in the mid-Atlantic states. By the 1950s, it was widespread throughout the United States and Canada. Its host range in North America is very similar to that of the closely related blue alfalfa aphid (Acyrthosiphon kondoi).

== Model organism ==
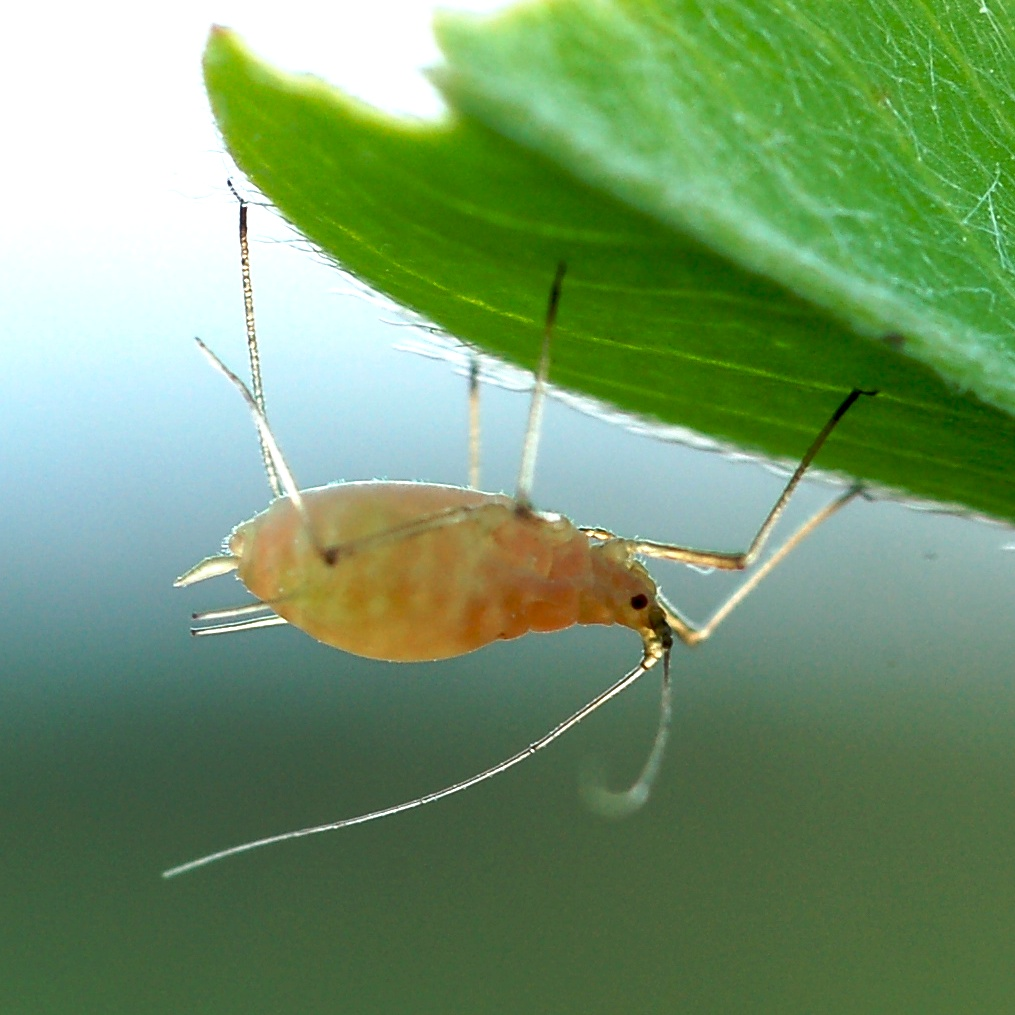
Adult, parthenogentic pea aphid on alfalfa - this red morph shows the reddish/dark markings due to carotenoids that some individuals produce.

A. pisum is considered as the model aphid species. Its reproductive cycle, including the sexual phase and the overwintering of eggs, can be easily completed on host plants under laboratory conditions, and the relatively large size of individuals facilitates physiological studies. In 2010, the International Aphid Genomics Consortium published an annotated draft sequence of the pea aphid genome composed of approximately 525 megabases and 34,000 predicted genes in 2n=8 chromosomes. This constitutes the first genome of a hemimetabolous insect to have been published. The pea aphid genome and other of its features are the focus of studies covering the following areas:

- Symbiosis with bacteria - As all Aphididae, A. pisum hosts the primary endosymbiont Buchnera aphidicola, which provides essential amino acids and is necessary for aphid reproduction. Buchnera is transmitted from mothers to offspring, and it has coevolved with aphids for dozens of millions of years. A. pisum also hosts a range of facultative bacterial symbionts (Hamiltonella defensa, Serratia symbiotica, Regiella insecticola) that can be transmitted maternally and horizontally, and which affect ecologically important traits in aphids, such as body color, resistance to abiotic and biotic stress, and nutrition. (Specifically, Hamiltonella defensa and Serratia symbiotica retard the development of parasitoid wasps, and Regiella insecticola decreases mortality due to Pandora neoaphidis)
- Polyphenism (the production of several discrete morphs by the same genotype) - Studies on pea aphids have helped to establish the environmental and genetic components controlling the production of sexual and winged morphs, among other features.
- Asexual reproduction - Pea aphid lineages include parthenogenesis in their life cycles, and some have even lost the sexual phase. Pea aphids are models for deciphering the origin and consequences of asexual reproduction, an important question in evolutionary biology.
- Polymorphism and physiology explaining phenotypic variations in aphids - Loci and physiological mechanisms underlying body color, reproductive cycle and the presence of wings in males (which is genetically based) have been identified in pea aphids or are being investigated. A. pisum is notable as one of few animals identified to synthesize carotenoids. Plants, fungi, and microorganisms can synthesize carotenoids, but torulene (3',4'-didehydro-β,γ-carotene, specifically a hydrocarbon carotene) made by pea aphids, is one of few carotenoids known to be synthesized by animals. Torulene imparts natural, red-colored patches to some aphids, which possibly aid in their camouflage and escape from predation by wasps. The aphids have gained the ability to synthesize torulene by horizontal gene transfer of a number of genes for carotenoid synthesis, apparently from fungi.
- Gene duplication and expansion of gene families - The pea aphid genome presents high levels of gene duplication compared to other insect genomes, such as Drosophila, with the notable expansion of some gene families.
- Interaction with host plants and speciation - As most phloem feeders, the pea aphid is adapted to feeding on a limited set of plants. Studies on pea aphids have identified candidate loci, molecular and physiological mechanisms that are involved in host nutrition and virulence. Genetic, molecular and physiological studies have also evidenced specialization to different host species as a motor of ecological speciation between pea aphid biotypes.

== Endosymbiotic relationship with Buchnera aphidicola ==
A pisum can survive only through its relationship with the bacterium Buchnera aphidicola, which also depends on this relationship for its own survival. A. pisum is the host, and Buchnera is the primary endosymbiont. Together, they form a holosymbiont, an entity that, formed by different species, becomes a single ecological unit. Treatment with antibiotics to remove the bacterium interrupts or reduces A. pisum 's reproduction and growth. Their relationship allows the aphid to use the bacterium to overcome the nutritional deficiencies of phloem sap that makes up A. pisum 's diet, while providing the bacterium with the genes that Buchnera lacks but which are needed for its survival. In both genetic research and as subjects of experiments, theirs is the most well-studied such relationship.

=== Evolution of the endosymbiotic relationship ===
This relationship likely evolved 160 to 280 million years ago. Their evolutionary history suggests that the bacterium originated from a common ancestor. It is thus likely that the original Buchnera infection of the aphid's common ancestor and their consequential coevolution caused the formation of one symbiotic partner as a new species, thereby dictating the formation of the other as also a new species. Buchnera, which is related to Enterobacteriaceae, including Escheriachia coli, likely evolved from a bacterium that originally occupied the gut of the aphid that was their common ancestor.

=== Nutritional symbiosis ===
Like other insects of the order Hemiptera, A.pisum utilizes an endosymbiotic bacterium to overcome the nutritional deficiencies of phloem sap. A. pisum feeds on phloem sap of host plants including Medicago sativa (alfalfa), Pisum sativa (pea), Trifolium pretense (red clover), and Vicia faba (broad bean). The phloem saps of these plants are nutritionally rich in carbohydrates but poor in terms of nitrogen. The ratio of essential amino acids to nonessential amino acids in these phloem saps ranges from 1:4-1:20. This ratio of essential to nonessential amino acids is severely disproportional compared to the 1:1 ratio present in animal tissues and necessary for survival.

Animals, including A. pisum, can produce nonessential amino acids de novo but cannot synthesize nine essential amino acids that must be obtained through their diets: histidine, isoleucine, leucine, lysine, methionine, phenylalanine, threonine, tryptophan, and valine. In addition to these nine essential amino acids, A. pisum is unable to synthesize arginine due to missing urea cycle genes. The endosymbiotic relationship with Buchnera allows A. pisum to overcome this lack of essential amino acids in the phloem sap

When provided with nonessential amino acids, Buchnera converts nonessential amino acids into essential amino acids to be returned to A. pisum. This nutritional provisioning has been examined genomically (metabolic complementary, discussed below) and experimentally. Isolated bacteriocytes containing Buchnera have been shown to actively take up 14C labeled glutamine (a nonessential amino acid) where it is then converted into glutamic acid. This glutamic acid is then taken up by the individual Buchnera cells and used to synthesize the essential amino acids isoleucine, leucine, phenylalanine, and valine as well as nonessential amino acids that can be returned to A. pisum. Mutual nutrient provisioning is likely the main reason for the persistence of this symbiosis.

=== Holosymbiont structure ===
Buchnera are housed in specialized, aphid-derived cells located in the hemocoel of the A. pisum body cavity. Each Buchnera cell has an inner and outer gram-negative cell membrane and is individually enclosed in an aphid-derived symbiosomal membrane. These encased cells are then grouped into specialized, aphid-derived bacteriocytes (mycetocytes). Bacteriocytes are large, polyploid cells surrounded by a thin lining of flat sheath cells. There are about 60-80 bacteriocytes in each pea aphid and are organized into the bi-lobed bacteriome.

A bacteriome is a specialized organ that runs along the length of the pea aphid on two sides of the body and joins near the hindgut. Bacteriocytes are located near the ovariole cluster and Buchnera cells are vertically transferred from the mother's ovaries through transovarial transmission. The Buchnera cells are transferred to eggs during oogenesis or to the developing embryos during embryogenesis.

=== Genome sequencing ===
A. pisum and Buchnera were the first insect-endosymbiont pair to have the genomes of both partners sequenced. This has provided researchers with a great deal of information about the evolutionary and molecular interactions of this endosymbiosis. The A. pisum and Buchnera genomes have experienced unique modifications that are likely related to the establishment and maintenance of the endosymbiotic relationship. The genomes of both organisms have undergone significant gene loss compared to related organisms. The Buchnera genome is 641-kb and consists of a circular chromosome with 2 plasmids. It has been reduced to one-seventh of the size of its closest free-living relative, E. coli.

Buchnera has lost genes that would allow it to live outside the host but maintains genes essential for the nutrition of A. pisum. The Buchnera genome is missing genes required for surface membrane construction such as lipopolysaccharides and phospholipids as well as genes associated with cellular defense. Transporter genes and regulatory genes are also missing from the genome. Such gene loss is typical of an obligate and intracellular bacterium.

The A. pisum genome has undergone more unique genomic changes compared to other insects of the order Hemiptera. The aphid genome is 464MB with aphid-specific orphan genes making up 20% of the genome and gene duplication present in more than 2000 gene families. These orphan genes and gene duplications are likely associated with the "metabolic, structural and developmental" components of the endosymbiotic relationship. A. pisum specific gene duplications of amino acid transporters highly expressed in bacteriocytes have been observed. These duplications are likely associated with the genetic establishment and maintenance of the endosymbiotic relationship.

No lateral gene transfer has been detected between A. pisum and Buchnera. It was previously believed that lateral gene transfer was responsible for the severe gene reduction in the Buchnera genome but sequencing has shown that this has not occurred.

=== Metabolic complementarity ===
Individually, the metabolic pathways of A. pisum and Buchnera are incomplete. Jointly, the genomes of these two organisms complement each other to produce complete metabolic pathways for the biosynthesis of nutrients such as amino acids and other essential molecules. The ancestral partners of this symbiosis are likely to have had complete metabolic pathways, however pressure to maintain these pathway genes was reduced due to redundancy as a result of the presence of the other partner's genome. Unlike other related insects, the A. pisum genome is missing genes necessary for the urea cycle. the purine salvage pathway, and other genes that code enzymes necessary for the biosynthesis of molecules.

These missing reaction intermediates are likely provided by genes within the Buchnera genome. For example, A. pisum is the only species with a sequenced genome known to be missing key components of the purine salvage pathway, essential for the production of DNA, RNA, signaling molecules, and ATP. The Buchnera genome contains the necessary genes to encode the reaction intermediates missing from the A. pisum genome. Through this complementation, the nucleotide requirements of both organisms are fulfilled: the purine salvage pathway is completed for A. pisum and Buchnera receives necessary guanosine.

The Buchnera genome has retained genes required for the biosynthesis of essential amino acids but has not retained genes responsible for the degradation of amino acids. The A. pisum genome on the other hand, contains 66 amino acid biosynthesis genes and 93 amino acid degradation genes. Both A. pisum and Buchnera contribute to the metabolic pathways of amino acid biosynthesis. This metabolic complementarity is illustrated by the use of asparagine, a nonessential amino acid in phloem sap, as a major precursor in the production essential and nonessential amino acids necessary for the growth and survival of A. pisum and Buchnera.

=== Immune system ===
Genome sequencing of A. pisum shows that the genome lacks expected genes essential to immune response pathways. The A. pisum genome lacks IMS, dFADD, Dredd and Retish genes that are a part of the IMD (immunodeficiency) pathway and present in other related insects. Also missing are peptidoglycan recognition proteins (PGRPs) that detect pathogens and alert the IMD pathway as well as antimicrobial peptide (AMP) genes which are produced once the immune pathway has been activated. A reduced immune system may have facilitated the establishment and sustained maintenance of the symbiotic relationship between the Buchnera bacterium and A. pisum. Also, phloem sap is a diet with reduced amounts of microbes which may have lower the evolutionary pressure of A. pisum to maintain the immune response pathway genes.

== Pests, diseases, and biocontrols ==
A. pisum faces threats from parasitoid wasps and the fungal pathogen Pandora neoaphidis. As such these are also promising potential biocontrols.
