= James B. Kring =

American entomologist

James Burton Kring (May 25, 1921 – October 29, 1990, Anna Maria, Florida) was an American entomologist who worked at the University of Massachusetts and at the University of Florida. He was a specialist on the biology and behavior of aphids.

Kring was born in Monett, Missouri and went to study at Rockhurst College, obtaining a BS in 1947 followed by studies at Kansas State University receiving a MS in 1948 and a PhD in 1952. Between 1940 and 1943 he served in the US Navy aboard the USS Hatfield. He also worked in the Medical Service Corps. He joined Connecticut Agricultural Experiment Station as an assistant entomology in 1951 and rose to the position of entomologist in 1962. He taught at the University of Connecticut from 1956 to 1980 becoming a professor at the University of Massachusetts, Amherst in 1977. Retiring in 1981 he worked as an adjunct professor at the University of Florida. Kring was recognized as entomologist of the year for 1989 by the Florida Entomological Society.

Kring conducted experiments on aphid ecology with Volker Moericke and J.S. Kennedy and among his discoveries was a positive response to sunlight in the dispersal phase and a negative response when alighting, with a positive response to plant pigment colors. He used these to suggest visual disruption through the use of reflective mulch to reduce aphid infestation in vegetable fields.
