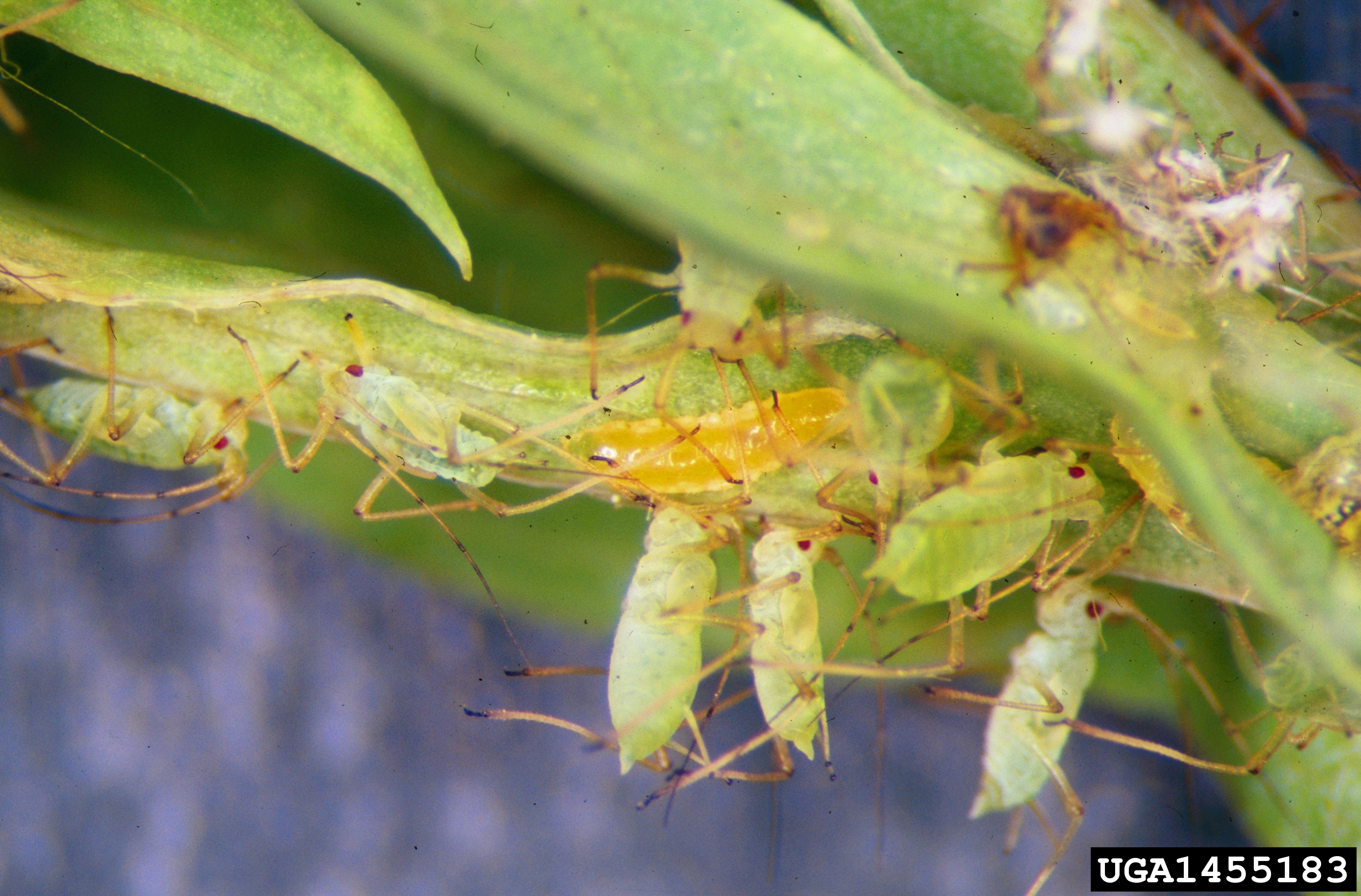
- Midge larva (center) in a pea aphid colony

Scientific classification
- Kingdom: Animalia
- Phylum: Arthropoda
- Clade: Pancrustacea
- Class: Insecta
- Order: Diptera
- Family: Cecidomyiidae
- Genus: Aphidoletes
- Species: A. aphidimyza

Binomial name
- Aphidoletes aphidimyza (Rondani, 1847)

Synonyms
- Aphidoletes basalis Felt, 1908; Aphidoletes borealis Felt, 1908; Aphidoletes flavida Felt, 1908; Aphidoletes fulva Felt, 1908; Aphidoletes marginata Felt, 1908; Aphidoletes meridionalis Felt, 1908; Bremia hamamelidis Felt, 1907; Cecidomya aphidimyza Rondani, 1847; Diplosis rosivora Coquillett, 1900; Phaenobremia doutti Pritchard, 1961

= Aphidoletes aphidimyza =

Species of fly

Aphidoletes aphidimyza, commonly referred to as the aphid midge, is a midge whose larvae feed on over 80 aphid species, including the green peach aphid.

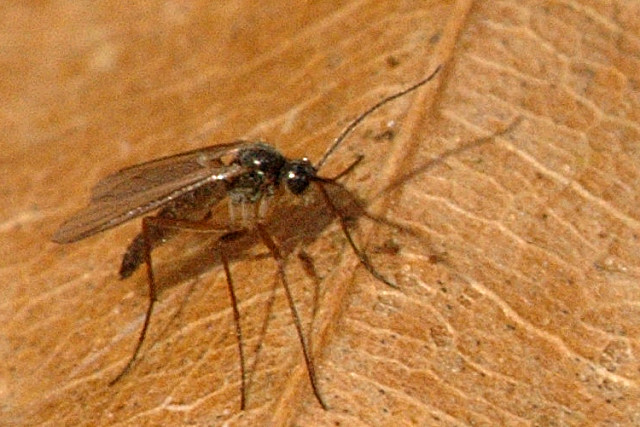
Aphidoletes aphidimyza

== Description ==
The adults are small (less than 1/8 inch [3.2 mm] long), black, delicate flies (similar to a fungus gnat) that live for an average of 10 days, feeding on aphid honeydew. They hide beneath the leaves during the day, and are active at night.

== Life cycle ==
Females deposit 100-250 tiny (1/64 inch [0.40 mm]) shiny orange eggs singly or in small groups among aphid colonies that hatch in 2–3 days. After 3–7 days the larvae drop to the ground and burrow 3/4 to 1 1/2 inches (1.9 to 3.8 cm) inches into the soil to pupate. They are most effective at 68–80 °F (20–27 °C) and high relative humidity.

== Behavior ==
The small, bright orange, slug-like larvae inject a toxin into aphids' leg joints to paralyze them and then suck out the aphid body contents through a hole bitten in the thorax. Larvae can consume aphids much larger than themselves and may kill many more aphids than they eat when aphid populations are high. A single larva grows up to 1/8 inch (0.32 cm) long and kills 4-65 aphids per day.

== Use in biological pest control ==
The aphid midge is commercially grown by insectaries for use as biological pest control in commercial greenhouse crops. It is supplied as pupae in trays or bottles containing a moist substrate such as vermiculite or peat moss for the pupae to complete their development. Once they are placed in the greenhouse they usually emerge from the shipping container as adults to begin egg-laying in 3–7 days depending on temperature.
