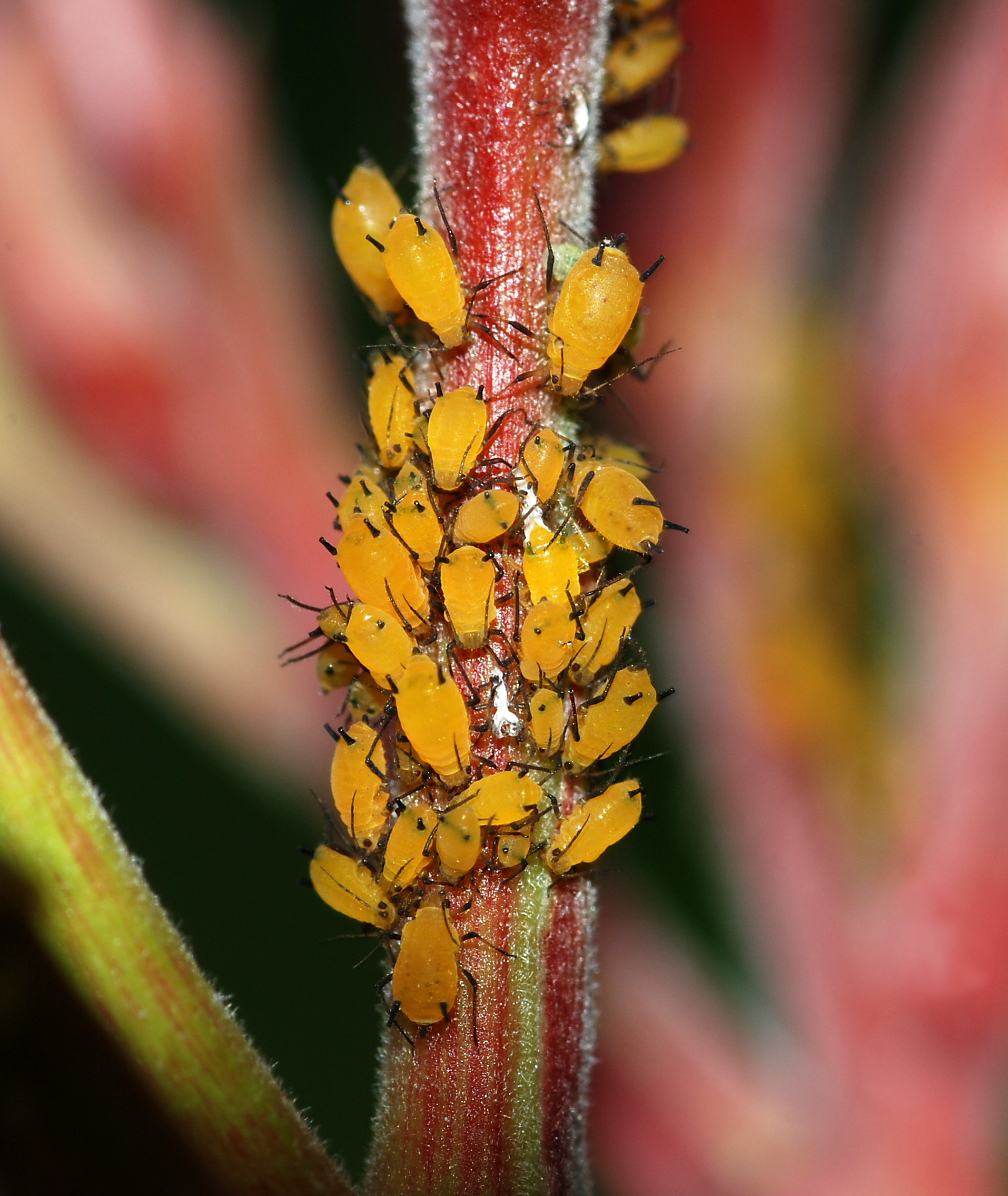
- The oleander aphid, Aphis nerii, a common aphid species found on plants in the milkweed family.

Scientific classification
- Kingdom: Animalia
- Phylum: Arthropoda
- Clade: Pancrustacea
- Class: Insecta
- Order: Hemiptera
- Suborder: Sternorrhyncha
- Infraorder: Aphidomorpha
- Superfamily: Aphidoidea; Latreille, 1802

Families
- Aphididae Latreille, 1802; †Bajsaphididae Homan, Zyla & Wegierek, 2015; †Canadaphididae Richards, 1966; †Cretamyzidae Heie, 1992; †Drepanochaitophoridae Zhang & Hong, 1999; †Oviparosiphidae Shaposhnikov, 1979; †Parvaverrucosidae Poinar & Brown, 2006; †Sinaphididae Zhang, Zhang, Hou & Ma, 1989; incertae sedis; †Palaeoforda tajmyrensis Kononova, 1977; †Penaphis Lin, 1980; †Plioaphis subhercynica Heie, 1968; †Sbenaphis Scudder, 1890; †Sunaphis Hong & Wang, 1990; †Xilutiancallis Wang, 1991; †Yueaphis Wang, 1993

= Aphid =

Aphid Temporal range: Permian–present

Superfamily of insects

Aphids are small sap-sucking insects in the family Aphididae (Note: All extant species are in the Aphidididae. Extinct aphids as listed in the taxobox were in the larger taxon Aphidoidea.) of the order Hemiptera. Common names include greenfly and blackfly, (Note: The term "black fly" is also used for the Simuliidae, among them the vector of river blindness.) although individuals within a species can vary widely in color. The group includes the fluffy white woolly aphids. A typical life cycle involves flightless females giving live birth to female nymphs—who may also be already pregnant, an adaptation scientists call telescoping generations—without the involvement of males. Maturing rapidly, females breed profusely so that the number of these insects multiplies quickly. Winged females may develop later in the season, allowing the insects to colonize new plants. In temperate regions, a phase of sexual reproduction occurs in the autumn, with the insects often overwintering as eggs.

The life cycle of some species involves an alternation between two species of host plants, for example between an annual crop and a woody plant. Some species feed on only one type of plant, while others are generalists, colonizing many plant groups. About 5,000 species of aphid have been described, all included in the family Aphididae. Around 400 of these are found on food and fiber crops, and many are serious pests of agriculture and forestry, as well as an annoyance for gardeners. So-called dairying ants have a mutualistic relationship with aphids, tending them for their honeydew and protecting them from predators.

Aphids are among the most destructive insect pests on cultivated plants in temperate regions. In addition to weakening the plant by sucking sap, they act as vectors for plant viruses and disfigure ornamental plants with deposits of honeydew and the subsequent growth of sooty moulds. Because of their ability to rapidly increase in numbers by asexual reproduction and telescopic development, they are a highly successful group of organisms from an ecological standpoint.

Large-scale control of aphids is not easy. Insecticides do not always produce reliable results, because of resistance to several classes of insecticide, and because aphids often feed on the undersides of leaves, and are thus shielded. On a small scale, water jets and soap sprays are quite effective. Natural enemies include predatory ladybugs, hoverfly larvae, parasitic wasps, aphid midge larvae, crab spiders, lacewing larvae, and entomopathogenic fungi. An integrated pest management strategy using biological pest control can work, but is difficult to achieve except in enclosed environments such as greenhouses.

== Etymology ==
Probable etymology of 'aphis' by misreading Greek κόρῐς as αφῐς

The name aphid is from Carl Linnaeus's modern Latin, most likely from misreading the Middle Greek κόρῐς, koris, 'bug' as αφῐς, aphis.

== Distribution ==
Aphids are distributed worldwide, but are most common in temperate zones. In contrast to many taxa, aphid species diversity is much lower in the tropics than in the temperate zones. They can migrate great distances, mainly through passive dispersal by winds. Winged aphids may also rise up in the day as high as 600 m where they are transported by strong winds. For example, the currant-lettuce aphid, Nasonovia ribisnigri, is believed to have spread from New Zealand to Tasmania around 2004 through easterly winds. Aphids have also been spread by human transportation of infested plant materials, making some species nearly cosmopolitan in their distribution.

== Evolution ==
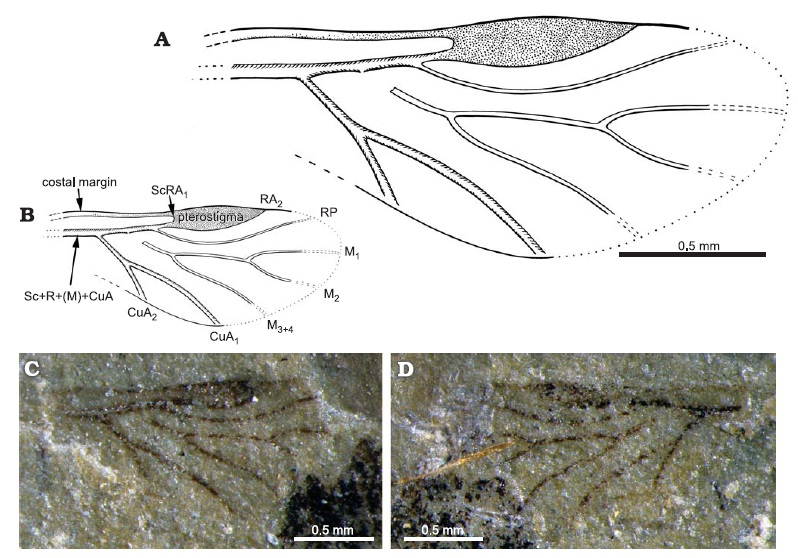
Forewing of the early Middle Triassic (early Anisian) aphid Vosegus triassicus

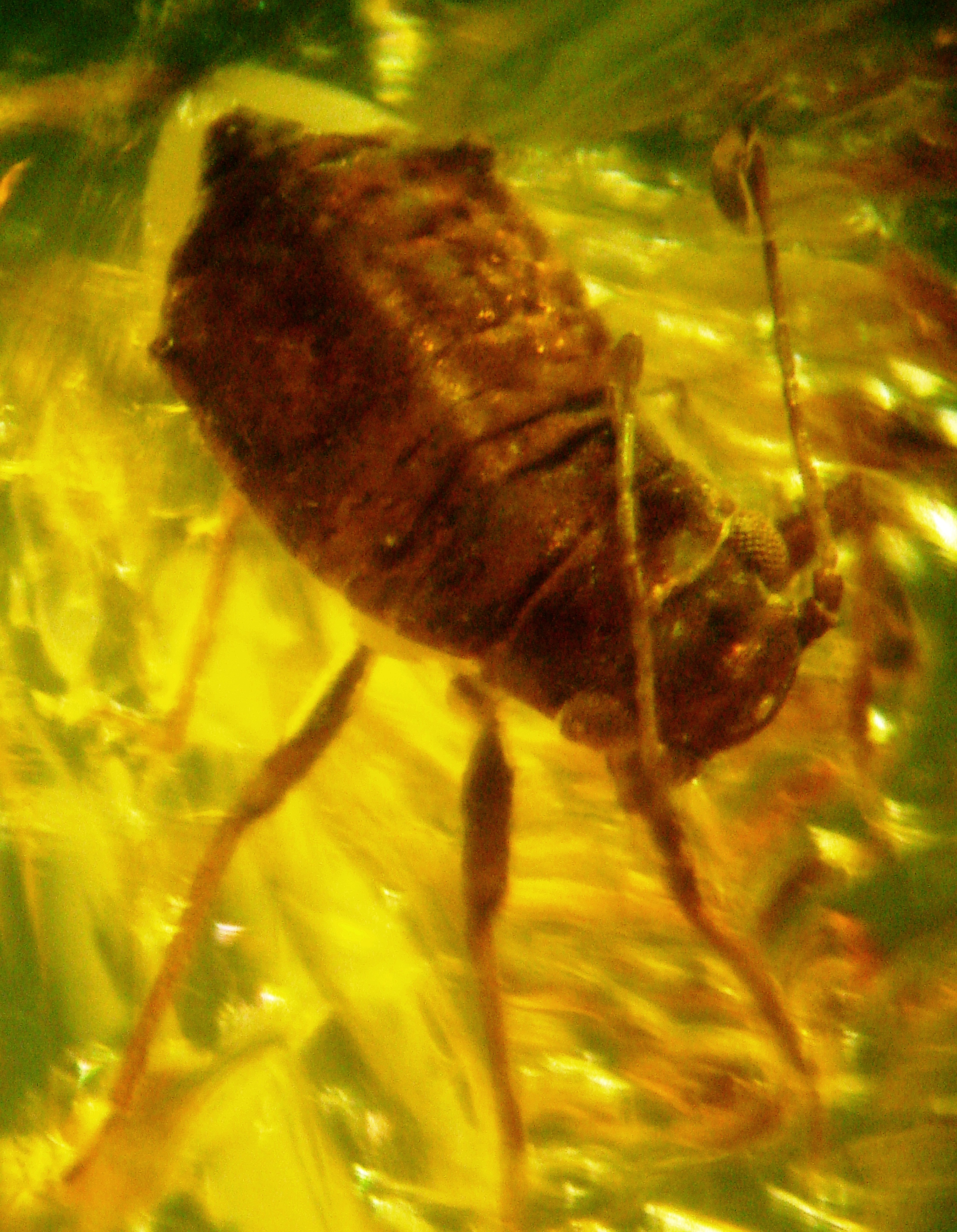
An aphid fossilised in Baltic amber (Eocene)

=== Fossil history ===
Aphids, and the closely related adelgids and phylloxerans, probably evolved from a common ancestor some 280 million years ago, in the Early Permian period. They probably fed on plants like Cordaitales or Cycadophyta. With their soft bodies, aphids do not fossilize well, and the oldest known fossil is of the species Triassoaphis cubitus from the Triassic. They do however sometimes get stuck in plant exudates which solidify into amber. In 1967, when Professor Ole Heie wrote his monograph Studies on Fossil Aphids, about sixty species had been described from the Triassic, Jurassic, Cretaceous and mostly the Tertiary periods, with Baltic amber contributing another forty species. The total number of species was small, but increased considerably with the appearance of the angiosperms 160 million years ago, as this allowed aphids to specialise, the speciation of aphids going hand-in-hand with the diversification of flowering plants. The earliest aphids were probably polyphagous, with monophagy developing later. It has been hypothesized that the ancestors of the Adelgidae lived on conifers while those of the Aphididae fed on the sap of Podocarpaceae or Araucariaceae that survived extinctions in the late Cretaceous. Organs like the cornicles did not appear until the Cretaceous period. One study alternatively suggests that ancestral aphids may have lived on angiosperm bark and that feeding on leaves may be a derived trait. The Lachninae have long mouth parts that are suitable for living on bark and it has been suggested that the mid-Cretaceous ancestor fed on the bark of angiosperm trees, switching to leaves of conifer hosts in the late Cretaceous. The Phylloxeridae may well be the oldest family still extant, but their fossil record is limited to the Lower Miocene Palaeophylloxera.

=== Taxonomy ===
Late 20th-century reclassification within the Hemiptera reduced the old taxon "Homoptera" to two suborders: Sternorrhyncha (aphids, whiteflies, scales, psyllids, etc.) and Auchenorrhyncha (cicadas, leafhoppers, treehoppers, planthoppers, etc.) with the suborder Heteroptera containing a large group of insects known as the true bugs. The infraorder Aphidomorpha within the Sternorrhyncha varies with circumscription with several fossil groups being especially difficult to place but includes the Adelgoidea, the Aphidoidea and the Phylloxeroidea. Some authors use a single superfamily Aphidoidea within which the Phylloxeridae and Adelgidae are also included while others have Aphidoidea with a sister superfamily Phylloxeroidea within which the Adelgidae and Phylloxeridae are placed. Early 21st-century reclassifications substantially rearranged the families within Aphidoidea: some old families were reduced to subfamily rank (e.g., Eriosomatidae), and many old subfamilies were elevated to family rank. The most recent authoritative classifications have three superfamilies Adelgoidea, Phylloxeroidea and Aphidoidea. The Aphidoidea includes a single large family Aphididae that includes all the ~5000 extant species.

=== Phylogeny ===
==== External ====
Aphids, adelgids, and phylloxerids are very closely related within the suborder Sternorrhyncha, the plant-sucking bugs. They are either placed in the insect superfamily Aphidoidea or into the superfamily Phylloxeroidea which contains the family Adelgidae and the family Phylloxeridae. Like aphids, phylloxera feed on the roots, leaves, and shoots of grape plants, but unlike aphids, do not produce honeydew or cornicle secretions. Phylloxera (Daktulosphaira vitifoliae) are insects which caused the Great French Wine Blight that devastated European viticulture in the 19th century. Similarly, adelgids or woolly conifer aphids, also feed on plant phloem and are sometimes described as aphids, but are more properly classified as aphid-like insects, because they have no cauda or cornicles.

The treatment of the groups especially concerning fossil groups varies greatly due to difficulties in resolving relationships. Most modern treatments include the three superfamilies, the Adelogidea, the Aphidoidea, and the Phylloxeroidea within the infraorder Aphidomorpha along with several fossil groups.

- Sternorrhyncha
  - Psylloidea (jumping plant lice, etc)
  - - Aleyrodoidea (whiteflies)
    - - Coccoidea (scale insects)
      - Aphidomorpha
        - - Phylloxeroidea
            - Phylloxeridae (phylloxerans)
            - Adelgidae (woolly conifer aphids)
          - Aphidoidea
            Aphididae (aphids)

==== Internal ====
The phylogenetic tree, based on Papasotiropoulos 2013 and Kim 2011, with additions from Ortiz-Rivas and Martinez-Torres 2009, shows the internal phylogeny of the Aphididae.

It has been suggested that the phylogeny of the aphid groups might be revealed by examining the phylogeny of their bacterial endosymbionts, especially the obligate endosymbiont Buchnera. The results depend on the assumption that the symbionts are strictly transmitted vertically through the generations. This assumption is well supported by the evidence, and several phylogenetic relationships have been suggested on the basis of endosymbiont studies.

- Aphididae
  - Lachninae
  - - Hormaphidinae
    - - Calaphidinae
      - - Chaitophorinae
        - - Eriosomatinae (woolly aphids)
          - Anoeciinae
        - - Capitophorus, Pterocomma
          - Aphidinae
            - Macrosiphini
            - Aphidini
              - Rhopalosiphina
              - Aphidina (Aphis spp)

== Anatomy ==
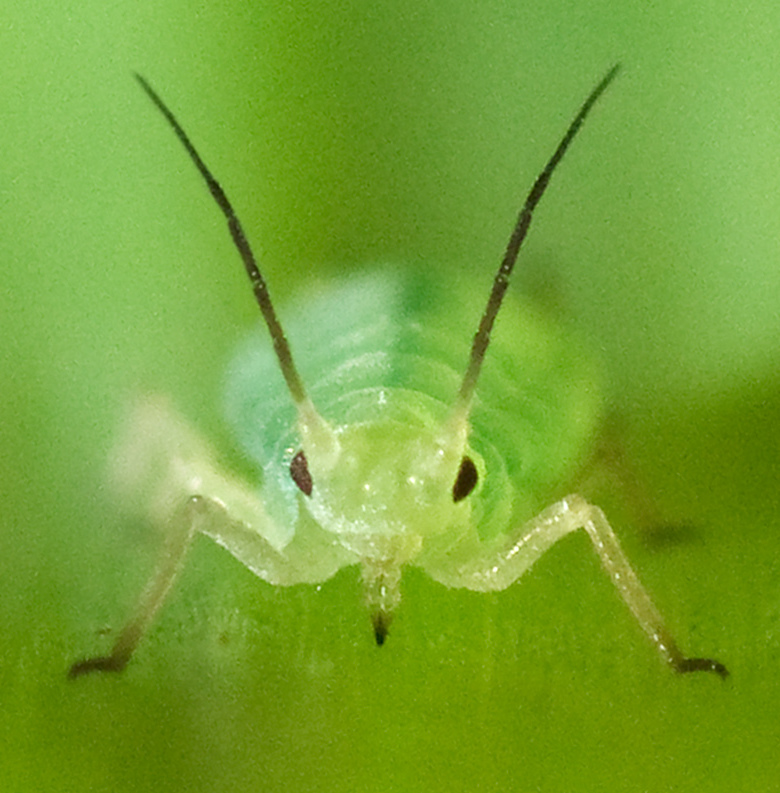
Front view of wheat aphid, Schizaphis graminum, showing the piercing-sucking mouthparts

A milkweed aphid moulting on narrow-leaf milkweed. Shown at ten times speed.

Most aphids have soft bodies, which may be green, black, brown, pink, or almost colorless. Aphids have antennae with two short, broad basal segments and up to four slender terminal segments. They have a pair of compound eyes, with an ocular tubercle behind and above each eye, made up of three lenses called triommatidia. They feed on sap and plant fluids using piercing-sucking mouthparts called stylets, enclosed in a sheath called a rostrum, which is formed from modifications of the mandible and maxilla of the insect mouthparts.

They have long, thin legs with two-jointed, two-clawed tarsi. The majority of aphids are wingless, but winged forms are produced at certain times of year in many species. Most aphids have a pair of cornicles (siphunculi), abdominal tubes on the dorsal surface of their fifth abdominal segment, through which they exude droplets of a quick-hardening defensive fluid containing triacylglycerols, called cornicle wax. Other defensive compounds can also be produced by some species. Aphids have a tail-like protrusion called a cauda above their rectal apertures. They have lost their Malpighian tubules.

When host plant quality becomes poor or conditions become crowded, some aphid species produce winged offspring (alates) that can disperse to other food sources. The mouthparts or eyes can be small or missing in some species and forms.

== Diet ==
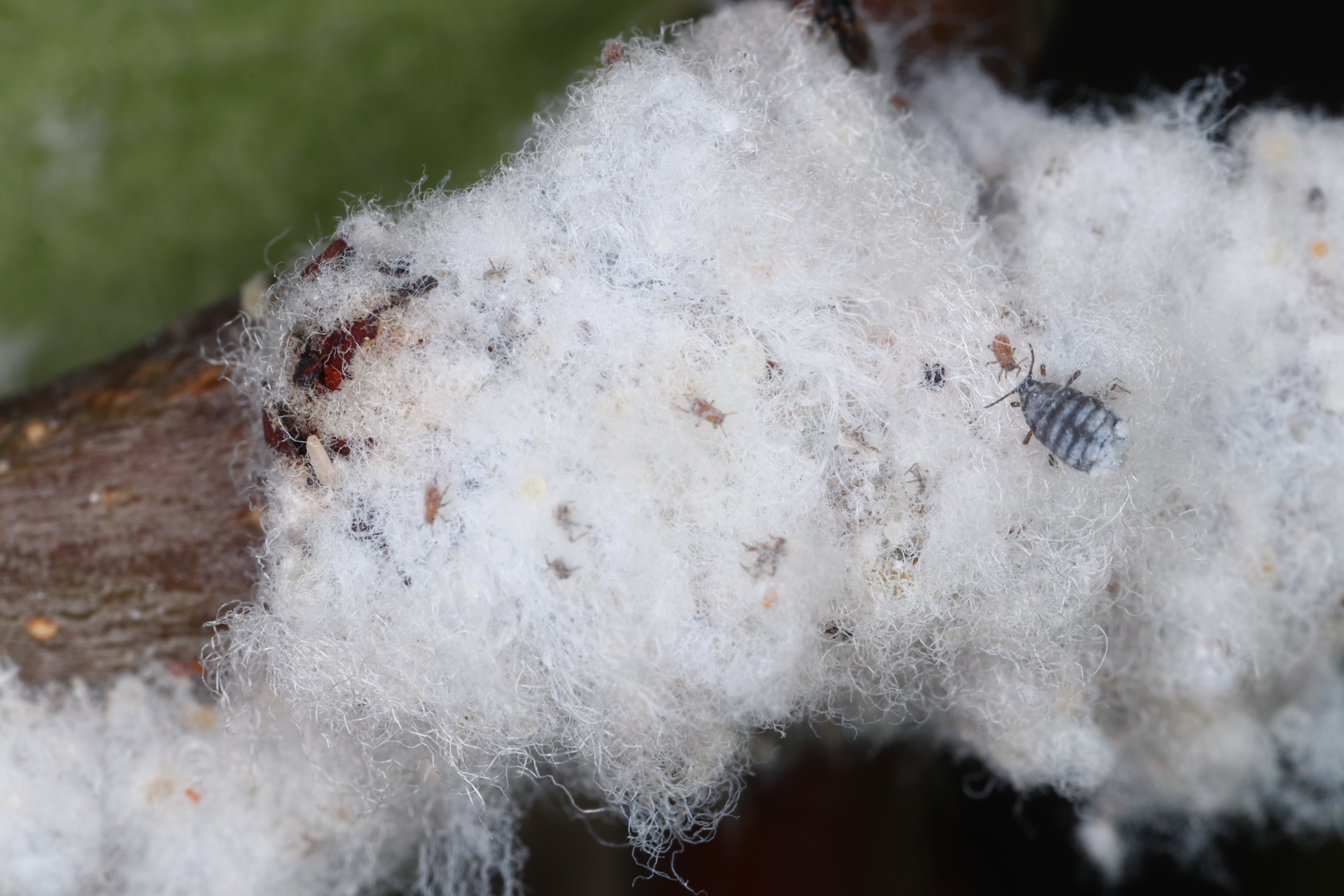
Woolly Aphids on Apple tree branch

Milkweed aphids on narrow-leaf milkweed eliminating honeydew. Unlike some aphids, these kick the drop away with their leg.

Many aphid species are monophagous (that is, they feed on only one plant species). Others, like the green peach aphid (Myzus persicae), feed on hundreds of plant species across many families. About 10% of species feed on different plants at different times of the year.

A new host plant is chosen by a winged adult by using visual cues, followed by olfaction using the antennae; if the plant smells right, the next action is probing the surface upon landing. The stylus is inserted and saliva secreted, the sap is sampled, the xylem may be tasted and finally, the phloem is tested. Aphid saliva provides lubrication and protection for the stylus during penetration, and may inhibit phloem-sealing mechanisms and has pectinases that ease penetration. Non-host plants can be rejected at any stage of the probe, but the transfer of viruses occurs early in the investigation process, at the time of the introduction of the saliva, so non-host plants can become infected.

Aphids usually feed passively on sap of phloem vessels in plants, as do many other hemipterans such as scale insects and cicadas. Once a phloem vessel is punctured, the sap, which is under pressure, is forced into the aphid's food canal. Occasionally, aphids also ingest xylem sap, which is a more dilute diet than phloem sap as the concentrations of sugars and amino acids are 1% of those in the phloem. Xylem sap is under negative hydrostatic pressure and requires active sucking, suggesting an important role in aphid physiology. As xylem sap ingestion has been observed following a dehydration period, aphids are thought to consume xylem sap to replenish their water balance; the consumption of the dilute sap of xylem permitting aphids to rehydrate. However, recent data showed aphids consume more xylem sap than expected and they notably do so when they are not dehydrated and when their fecundity decreases. This suggests aphids, and potentially, all the phloem-sap feeding species of the order Hemiptera, consume xylem sap for reasons other than replenishing water balance. Although aphids passively take in phloem sap, which is under pressure, they can also draw fluid at negative or atmospheric pressure using the cibarial-pharyngeal pump mechanism present in their head.

Xylem sap consumption may be related to osmoregulation. High osmotic pressure in the stomach, caused by high sucrose concentration, can lead to water transfer from the hemolymph to the stomach, thus resulting in hyperosmotic stress and eventually to the death of the insect. Aphids avoid this fate by osmoregulating through several processes. Sucrose concentration is directly reduced by assimilating sucrose toward metabolism and by synthesizing oligosaccharides from several sucrose molecules, thus reducing the solute concentration and consequently the osmotic pressure. Oligosaccharides are then excreted through honeydew, explaining its high sugar concentrations, which can then be used by other animals such as ants. Furthermore, water is transferred from the hindgut, where osmotic pressure has already been reduced, to the stomach to dilute stomach content. Eventually, aphids consume xylem sap to dilute the stomach osmotic pressure. All these processes function synergetically, and enable aphids to feed on high-sucrose-concentration plant sap, as well as to adapt to varying sucrose concentrations.

Plant sap is an unbalanced diet for aphids, as it lacks essential amino acids, which aphids, like all animals, cannot synthesise, and possesses a high osmotic pressure due to its high sucrose concentration. Essential amino acids are provided to aphids by bacterial endosymbionts, harboured in special cells, bacteriocytes. These symbionts recycle glutamate, a metabolic waste of their host, into essential amino acids.

== Carotenoids and photoheterotrophy ==
Some species of aphids have acquired the ability to synthesise red carotenoids by horizontal gene transfer from fungi. They are the only animals other than two-spotted spider mites and the oriental hornet with this capability. Using their carotenoids, aphids may well be able to absorb solar energy and convert it to a form that their cells can use, ATP. This is the only known example of photoheterotrophy in animals. The carotene pigments in aphids form a layer close to the surface of the cuticle, ideally placed to absorb sunlight. The excited carotenoids seem to reduce NAD to NADH which is oxidized in the mitochondria for energy.

== Reproduction ==
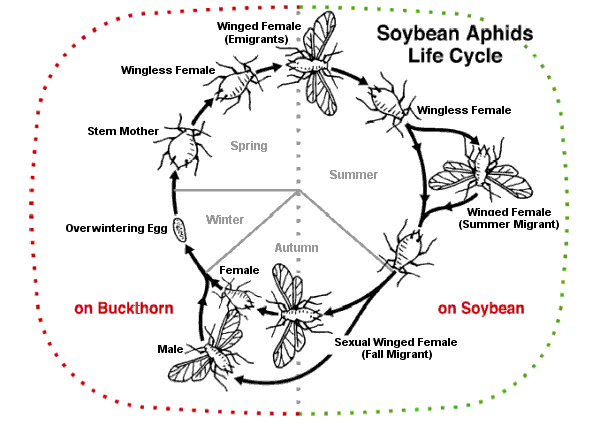
Soybean aphid alternates between hosts and between asexual and sexual reproduction.

Winged adult (alate) milkweed aphids. Some scenes repeated at one-twentieth speed. Recorded at 60 fps.

The simplest reproductive strategy is for an aphid to have a single host all year round. On this it may alternate between sexual and asexual generations (holocyclic) or alternatively, all young may be produced by parthenogenesis, eggs never being laid (anholocyclic). Some species can have both holocyclic and anholocyclic populations under different circumstances but no known aphid species reproduce solely by sexual means. The alternation of sexual and asexual generations may have evolved repeatedly.

However, aphid reproduction is often more complex than this and involves migration between different host plants. In about 10% of species, there is an alternation between woody (primary) hosts on which the aphids overwinter and herbaceous (secondary) host plants, where they reproduce abundantly in the summer. A few species can produce a soldier caste, other species show extensive polyphenism under different environmental conditions and some can control the sex ratio of their offspring depending on external factors.

When a typical sophisticated reproductive strategy is used, only females are present in the population at the beginning of the seasonal cycle (although a few species of aphids have been found to have both male and female sexes at this time). The overwintering eggs that hatch in the spring result in females, called fundatrices (stem mothers). Reproduction typically does not involve males (parthenogenesis) and results in a live birth (viviparity). The live young are produced by pseudoplacental viviparity, which is the development of eggs, deficient in the yolk, the embryos fed by a tissue acting as a placenta. The young emerge from the mother soon after hatching.

Eggs are parthenogenetically produced without meiosis and the offspring are clonal to their mother, so they are all female (thelytoky). The embryos develop within the mothers' ovarioles, which then give birth to live (already hatched) first-instar female nymphs. As the eggs begin to develop immediately after ovulation, an adult female can house developing female nymphs which already have parthenogenetically developing embryos inside them (i.e. they are born pregnant). This telescoping of generations enables aphids to increase in number with great rapidity. The offspring resemble their parent in every way except size. Thus, a female's diet can affect the body size and birth rate of more than two generations (daughters and granddaughters).

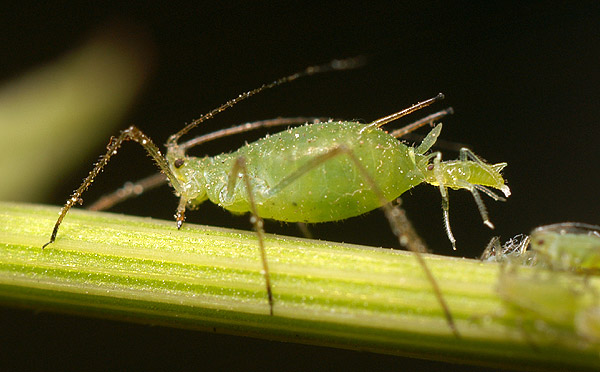
Aphid giving birth to live young: populations are often entirely female.

This process repeats itself throughout the summer, producing multiple generations that typically live 20 to 40 days. For example, some species of cabbage aphids (like Brevicoryne brassicae) can produce up to 41 generations of females in a season. Thus, one female hatched in spring can theoretically produce billions of descendants, were they all to survive.

In autumn, aphids reproduce sexually and lay eggs. Environmental factors such as a change in photoperiod and temperature, or perhaps a lower food quantity or quality, causes females to parthenogenetically produce sexual females and males. The males are genetically identical to their mothers except that, with the aphids' X0 sex-determination system, they have one fewer sex chromosome. These sexual aphids may lack wings or even mouthparts. Sexual females and males mate, and females lay eggs that develop outside the mother. The eggs survive the winter and hatch into winged (alate) or wingless females the following spring. This occurs in, for example, the life cycle of the rose aphid (Macrosiphum rosae), which may be considered typical of the family. However, in warm environments, such as in the tropics or a greenhouse, aphids may go on reproducing asexually for many years.

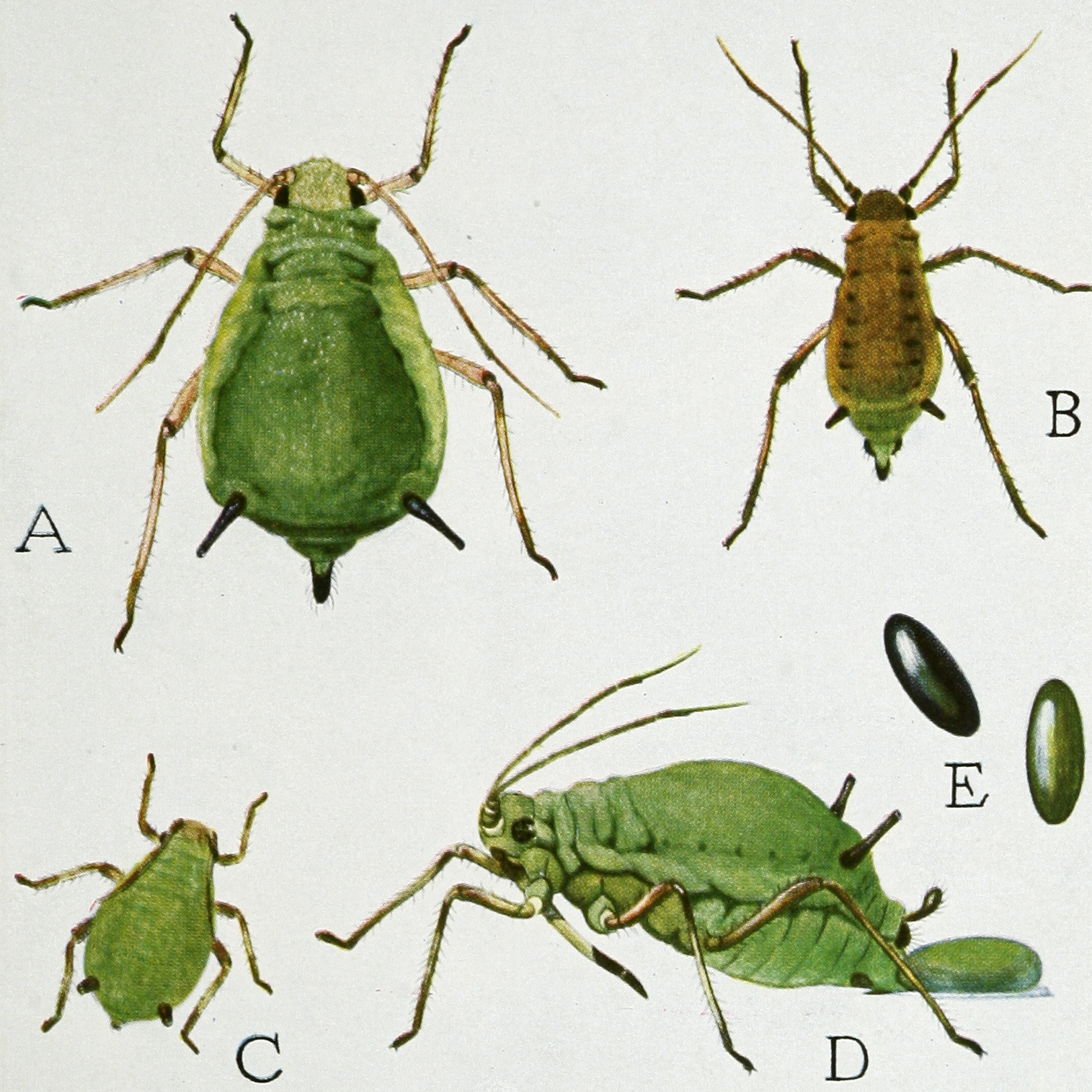
The life stages of the green apple aphid (Aphis pomi). Drawing by Robert Evans Snodgrass, 1930

Aphids reproducing asexually by parthenogenesis can have genetically identical winged and non-winged female progeny. Control is complex; some aphids alternate during their life-cycles between genetic control (polymorphism) and environmental control (polyphenism) of production of winged or wingless forms. Winged progeny tend to be produced more abundantly under unfavorable or stressful conditions. Some species produce winged progeny in response to low food quality or quantity. e.g. when a host plant is starting to senesce. The winged females migrate to start new colonies on a new host plant. For example, the apple aphid (Aphis pomi), after producing many generations of wingless females gives rise to winged forms that fly to other branches or trees of its typical food plant. Aphids that are attacked by ladybugs, lacewings, parasitoid wasps, or other predators can change the dynamics of their progeny production. When aphids are attacked by these predators, alarm pheromones, in particular beta-farnesene, are released from the cornicles. These alarm pheromones cause several behavioral modifications that, depending on the aphid species, can include walking away and dropping off the host plant. Additionally, alarm pheromone perception can induce the aphids to produce winged progeny that can leave the host plant in search of a safer feeding site. Viral infections, which can be extremely harmful to aphids, can also lead to the production of winged offspring. For example, Densovirus infection has a negative impact on Dysaphis plantaginea (rosy apple aphid) reproduction, but contributes to the development of aphids with wings, which can transmit the virus more easily to new host plants. Additionally, symbiotic bacteria that live inside of the aphids can also alter aphid reproductive strategies based on the exposure to environmental stressors.

In the autumn, host-alternating (heteroecious) aphid species produce a special winged generation that flies to different host plants for the sexual part of the life cycle. Flightless female and male sexual forms are produced and lay eggs. Some species such as Aphis fabae (black bean aphid), Metopolophium dirhodum (rose-grain aphid), Myzus persicae (peach-potato aphid), and Rhopalosiphum padi (bird cherry-oat aphid) are serious pests. They overwinter on primary hosts on trees or bushes; in summer, they migrate to their secondary host on a herbaceous plant, often a crop, then the gynoparae return to the tree in autumn. Another example is the soybean aphid (Aphis glycines). As fall approaches, the soybean plants begin to senesce from the bottom upwards. The aphids are forced upwards and start to produce winged forms, first females and later males, which fly off to the primary host, buckthorn. Here they mate and overwinter as eggs.

== Ecology ==
=== Ant mutualism ===
Some species of ants farm aphids, protecting them on the plants where they are feeding, and consuming the honeydew the aphids release from the terminations of their alimentary canals. This is a mutualistic relationship, with these dairying ants milking the aphids by stroking them with their antennae. (Note: Dairying ants also milk mealybugs and other insects.) Although symbiotic, the feeding behaviour of aphids is altered by ant attendance. Aphids attended by ants tend to increase the production of honeydew in smaller drops with a greater concentration of amino acids. Macrosiphoniella yomogicola has green and red morphs in Japan where Lasius japonicus ants prefer the green morph which provides more honeydew and select for them. Their honeydew contains dopamine and makes the attendant ants act more aggressively against intruders; the aphids are thought to be selfishly manipulating the ants to provide them better protection from predators and parasites.

Some farming ant species gather and store the aphid eggs in their nests over the winter. In the spring, the ants carry the newly hatched aphids back to the plants. Some species of dairying ants (such as the European yellow meadow ant, Lasius flavus) manage large herds of aphids that feed on roots of plants in the ant colony. Queens leaving to start a new colony take an aphid egg to found a new herd of underground aphids in the new colony. These farming ants protect the aphids by fighting off aphid predators. Some bees in coniferous forests collect aphid honeydew to make forest honey.

An interesting variation in ant–aphid relationships involves lycaenid butterflies and Myrmica ants. For example, Niphanda fusca butterflies lay eggs on plants where ants tend herds of aphids. The eggs hatch as caterpillars which feed on the aphids. The ants do not defend the aphids from the caterpillars, since the caterpillars produce a pheromone which deceives the ants into treating them like ants, and carrying the caterpillars into their nest. Once there, the ants feed the caterpillars, which in return produce honeydew for the ants. When the caterpillars reach full size, they crawl to the colony entrance and form cocoons. After two weeks, the adult butterflies emerge and take flight. At this point, the ants attack the butterflies, but the butterflies have a sticky wool-like substance on their wings that disables the ants' jaws, allowing the butterflies to fly away without being harmed.

Another ant-mimicking gall aphid, Paracletus cimiciformis (Eriosomatinae), has evolved a complex double strategy involving two morphs of the same clone and Tetramorium ants. Aphids of the round morph cause the ants to farm them, as with many other aphids. The flat morph aphids are aggressive mimics with a "wolf in sheep's clothing" strategy: they have hydrocarbons in their cuticle that mimic those of the ants, and the ants carry them into the brood chamber of the ants' nest and raise them like ant larvae. Once there, the flat morph aphids behave like predators, drinking the body fluids of ant larvae.

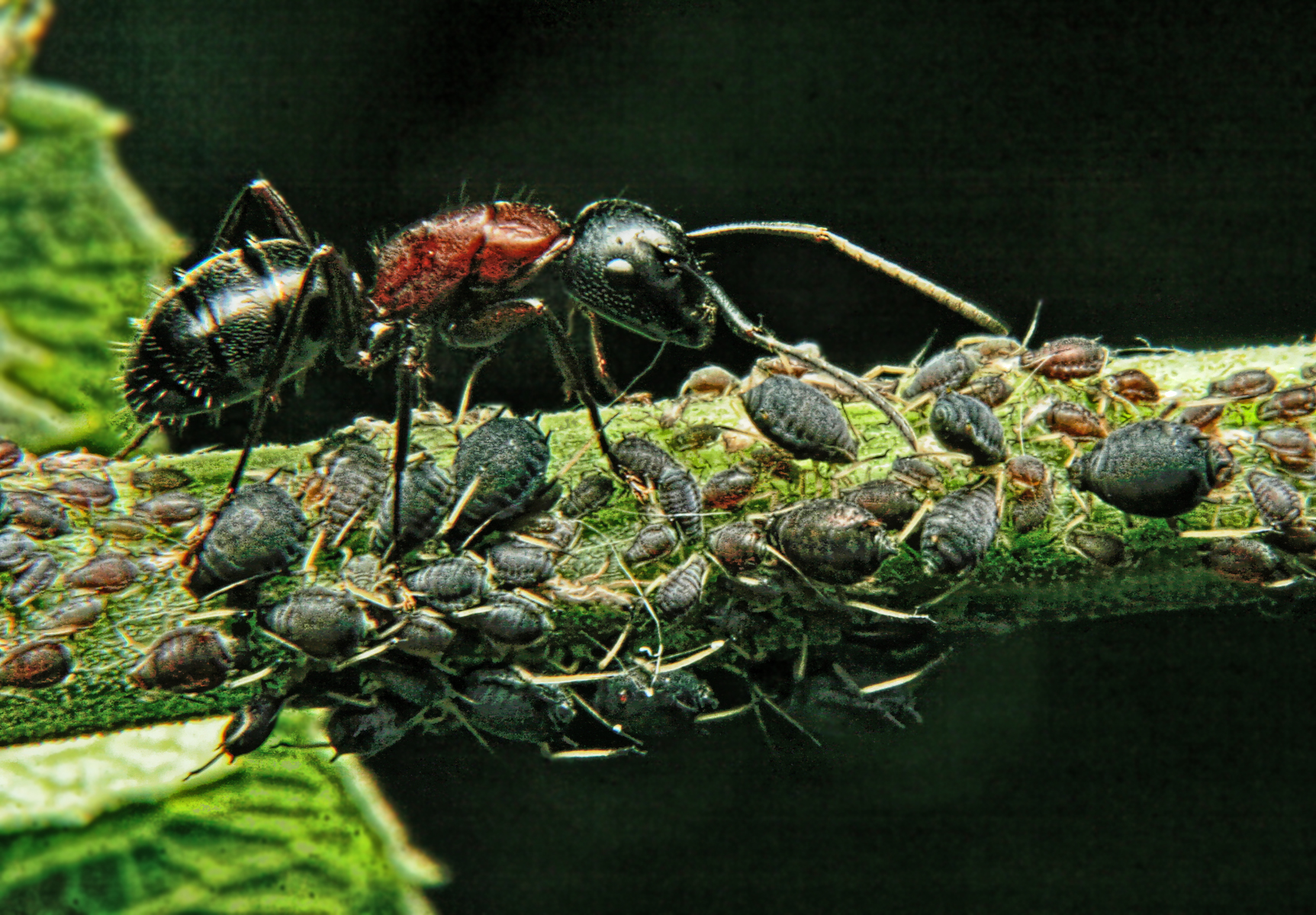
An ant guards its aphids

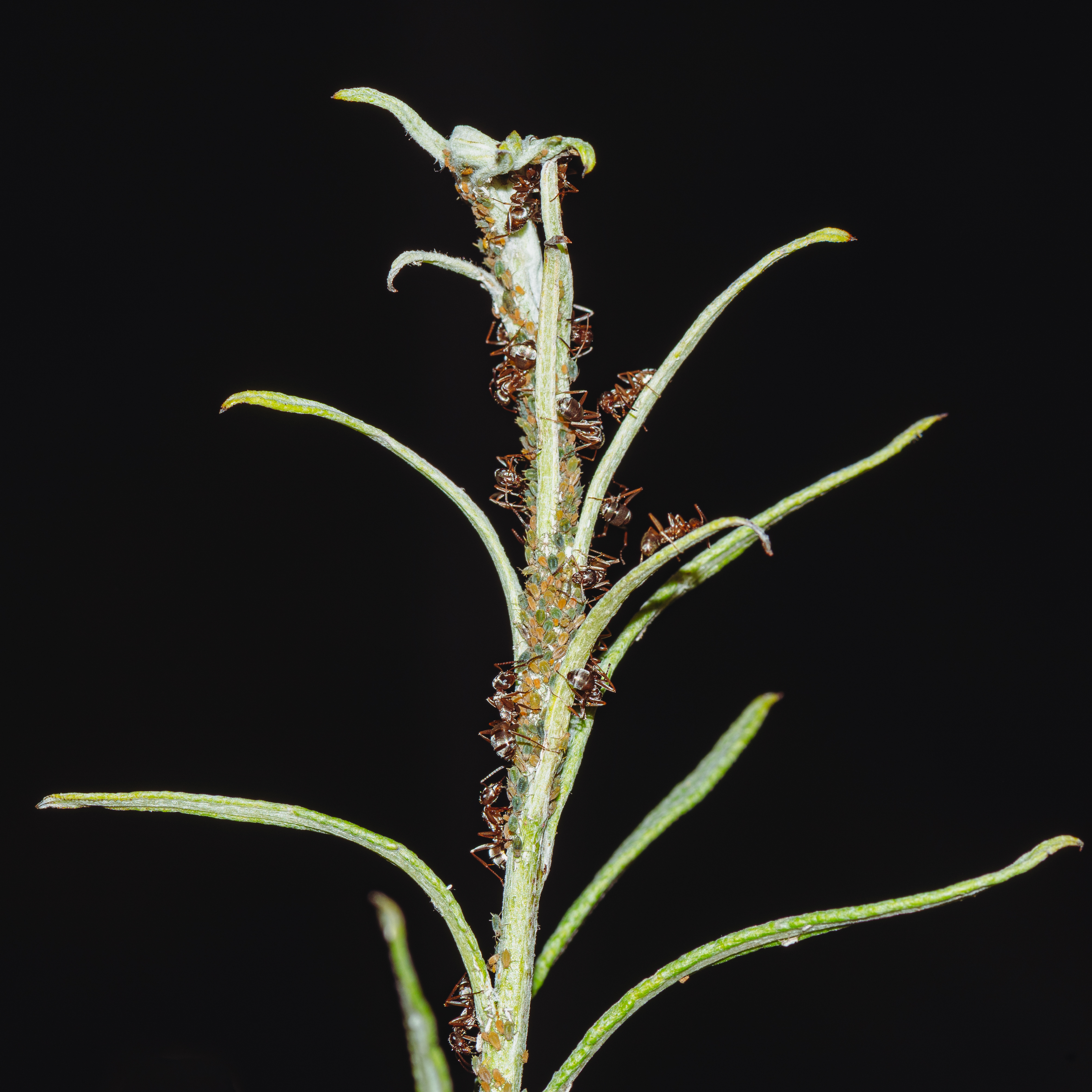
Ants tending aphids

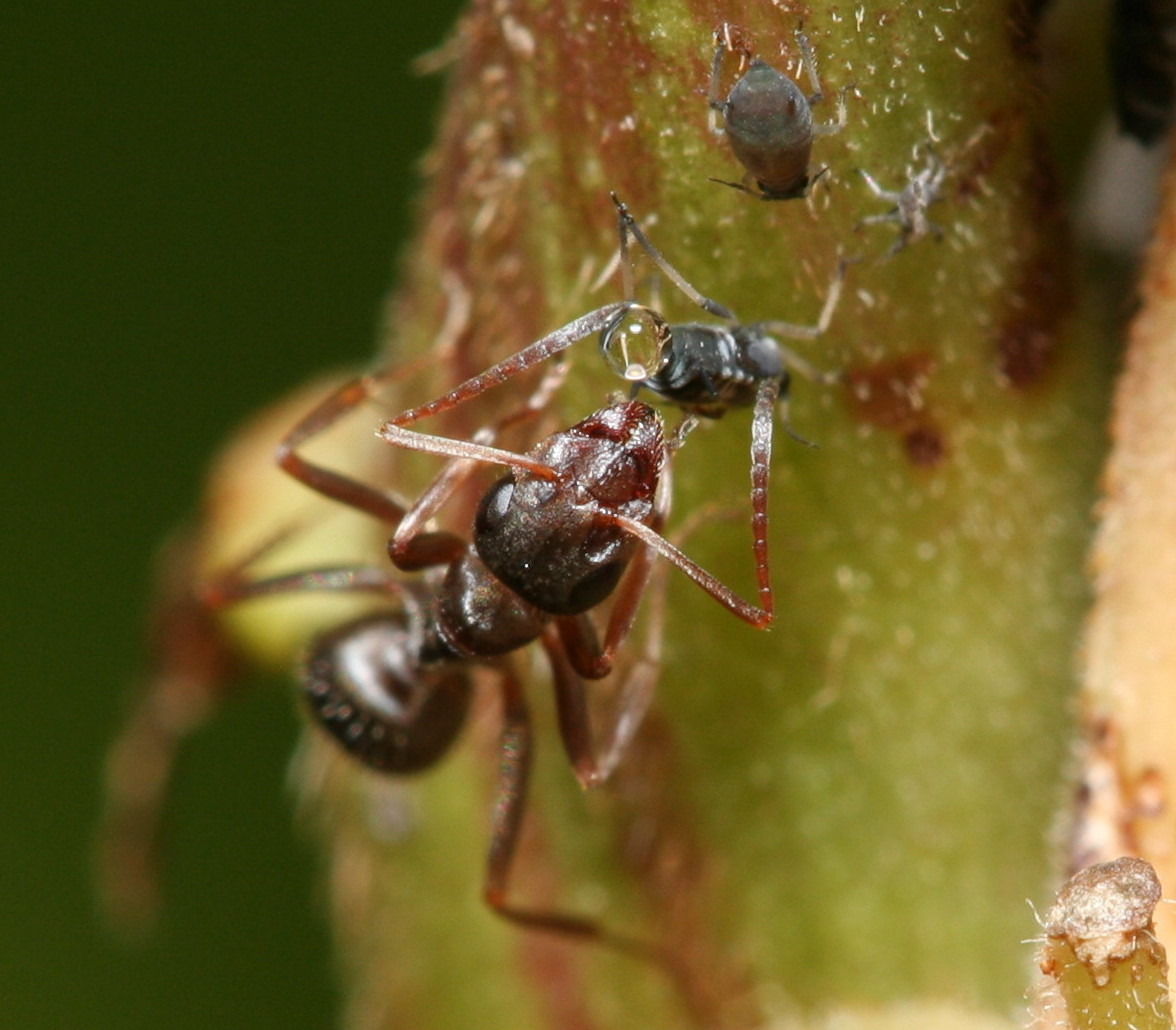
Ant extracting honeydew from an aphid

Ants tending aphids and collecting honeydew secreted. A wrinkled solder beetle flies in and eats an aphid before being chased away by the ants.

=== Bacterial endosymbiosis ===
Endosymbiosis with micro-organisms is common in insects, with more than 10% of insect species relying on intracellular bacteria for their development and survival. Aphids harbour a vertically transmitted (from parent to its offspring) obligate symbiosis with Buchnera aphidicola, the primary symbiont, inside specialized cells, the bacteriocytes. Five of the bacteria genes have been transferred to the aphid nucleus. The original association is estimated to have occurred in a common ancestor 280 to 160 million years ago and enabled aphids to exploit a new ecological niche, feeding on phloem-sap of vascular plants. B. aphidicola provides its host with essential amino acids, which are present in low concentrations in plant sap. The metabolites from endosymbionts are also excreted in honeydew. The stable intracellular conditions, as well as the bottleneck effect experienced during the transmission of a few bacteria from the mother to each nymph, increase the probability of transmission of mutations and gene deletions. As a result, the size of the B. aphidicola genome is greatly reduced, compared to its putative ancestor. Despite the apparent loss of transcription factors in the reduced genome, gene expression is highly regulated, as shown by the ten-fold variation in expression levels between different genes under normal conditions. Buchnera aphidicola gene transcription, although not well understood, is thought to be regulated by a small number of global transcriptional regulators and/or through nutrient supplies from the aphid host.

Some aphid colonies also harbour secondary or facultative (optional extra) bacterial symbionts. These are vertically transmitted, and sometimes also horizontally (from one lineage to another and possibly from one species to another). So far, the role of only some of the secondary symbionts has been described; Regiella insecticola plays a role in defining the host-plant range, Hamiltonella defensa provides resistance to parasitoids but only when it is in turn infected by the bacteriophage APSE, and Serratia symbiotica prevents the deleterious effects of heat.

=== Predators ===
A western polished lady beetle and her eggs near a milkweed aphid colony.

Aphids are eaten by many bird and insect predators. In a study on a farm in North Carolina, six species of passerine bird consumed nearly a million aphids per day between them, the top predators being the American goldfinch, with aphids forming 83% of its diet, and the vesper sparrow. Insects that attack aphids include the adults and larvae of predatory ladybirds, hoverfly larvae, parasitic wasps, aphid midge larvae, "aphid lions" (the larvae of green lacewings), and arachnids such as spiders. Among ladybirds, Myzia oblongoguttata is a dietary specialist which only feeds on conifer aphids, whereas Adalia bipunctata and Coccinella septempunctata are generalists, feeding on large numbers of species. The eggs are laid in batches, each female laying several hundred. Female hoverflies lay several thousand eggs. The adults feed on pollen and nectar but the larvae feed voraciously on aphids; Eupeodes corollae adjusts the number of eggs laid to the size of the aphid colony.

Predators eating aphids

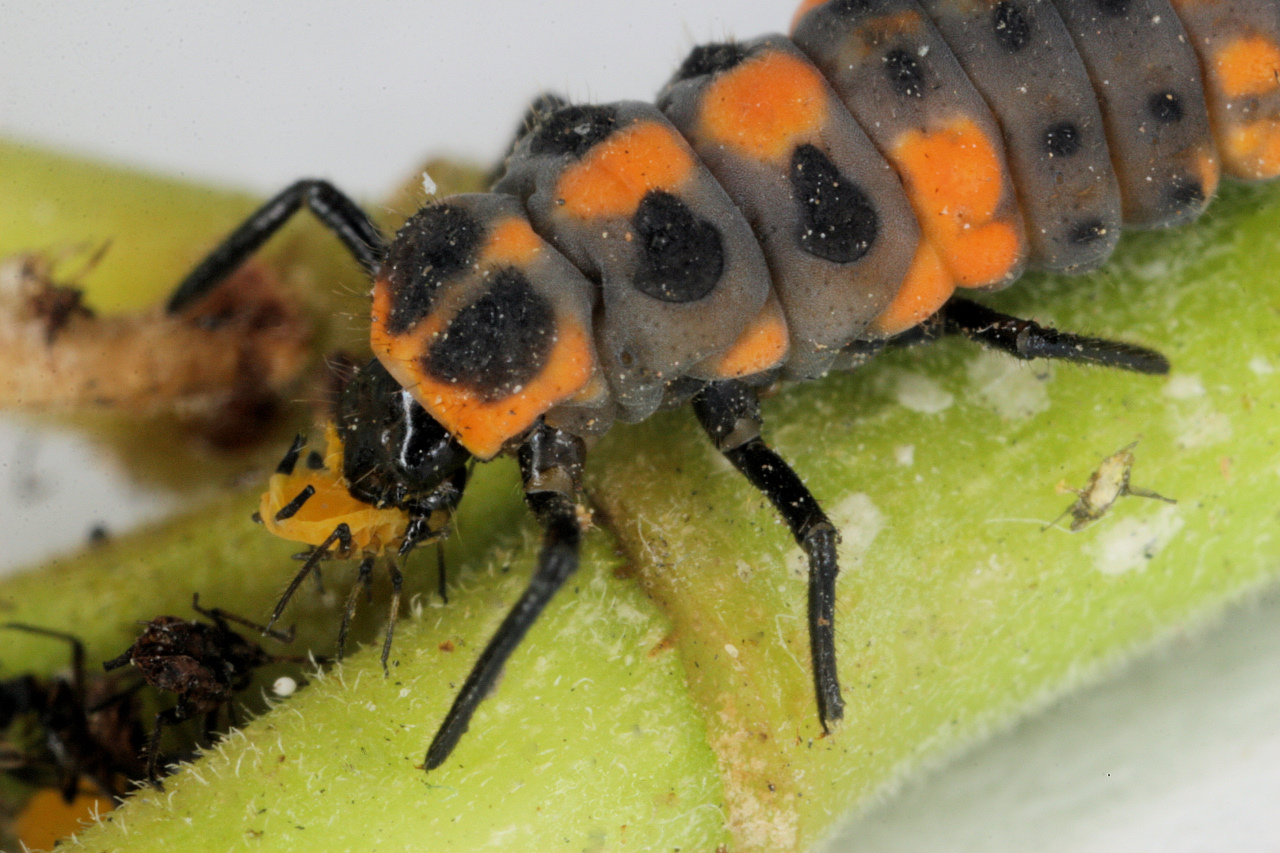
Ladybird larva

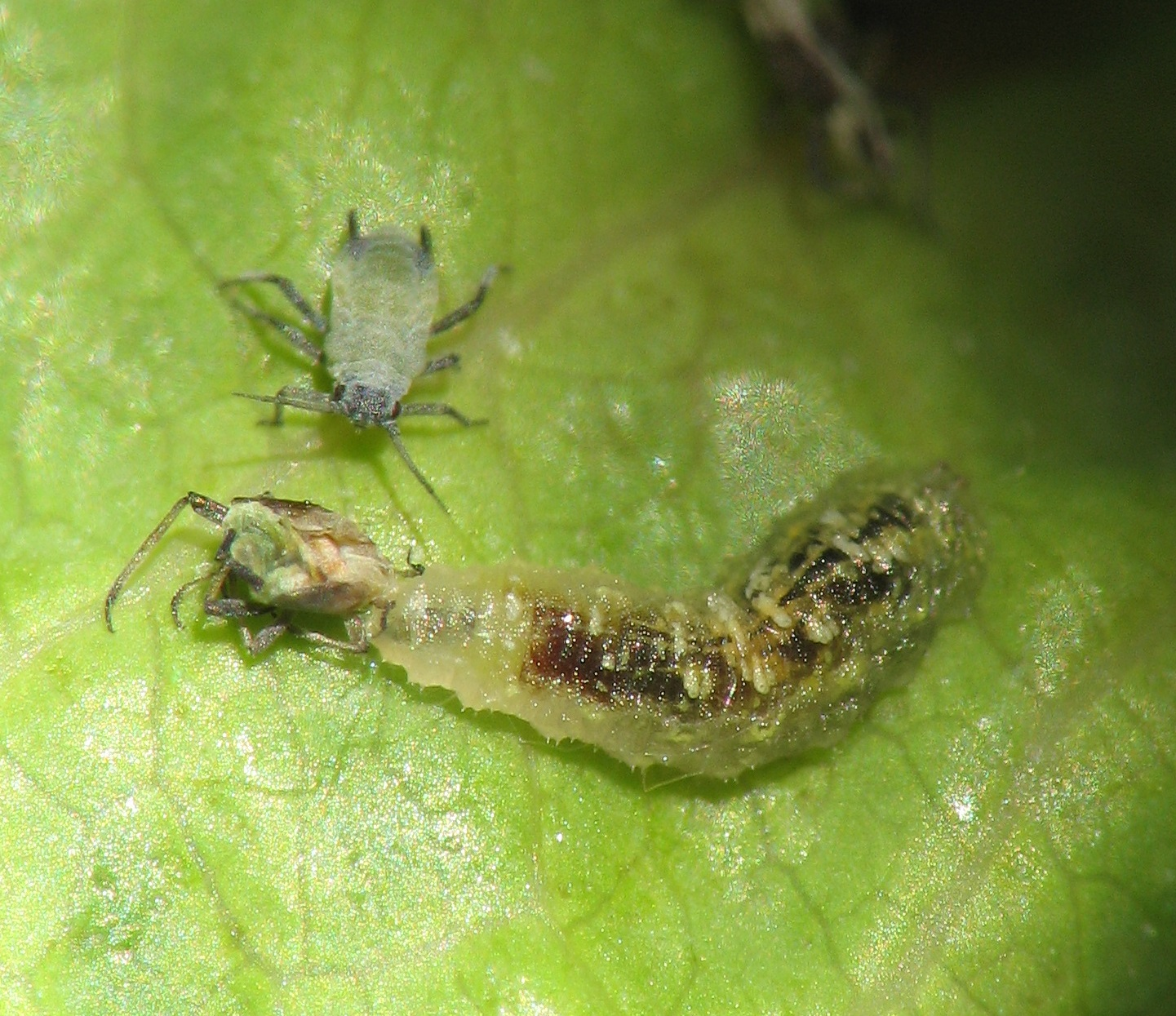
Hoverfly larva

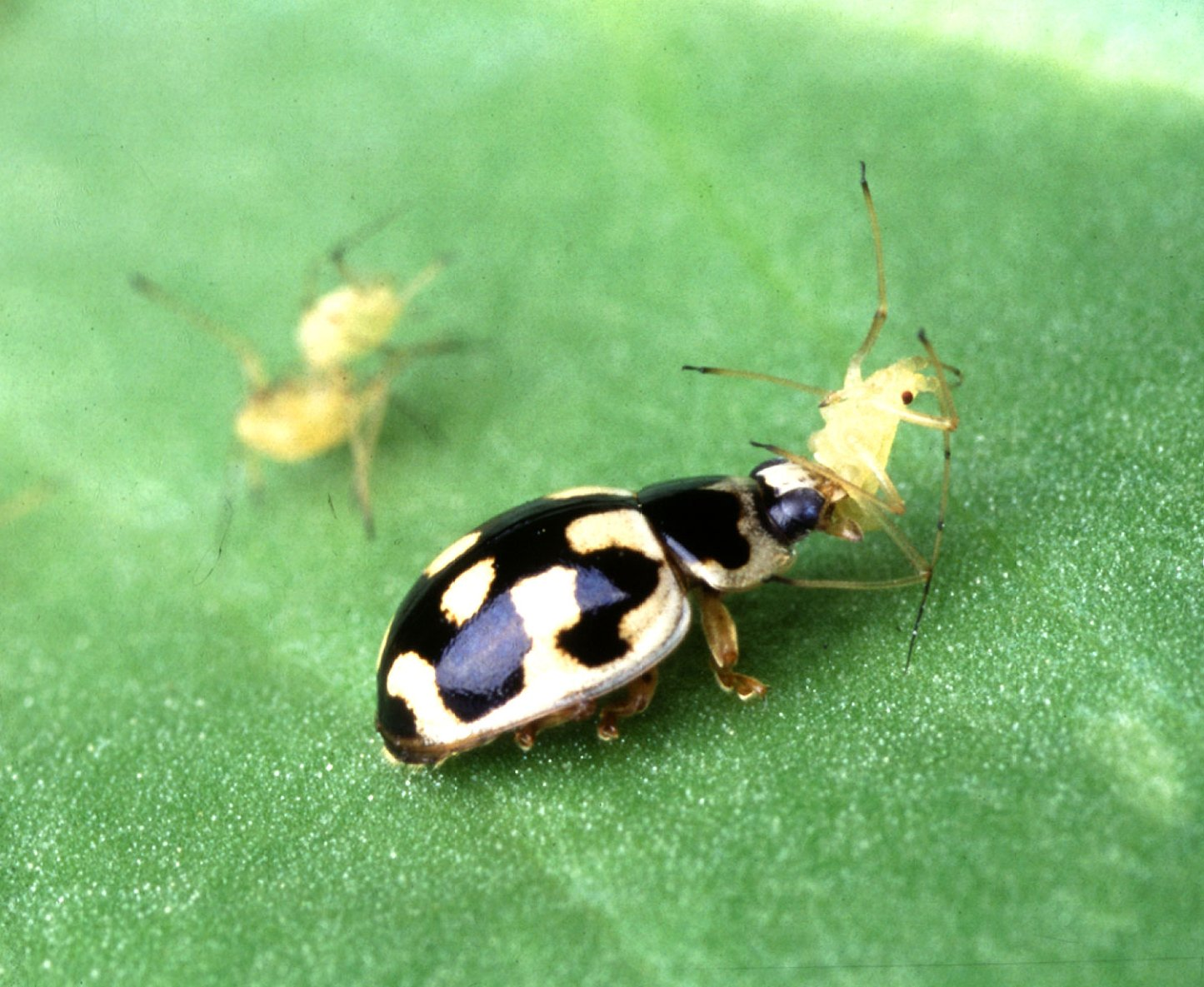
The ladybird beetle Propylea quatuordecimpunctata

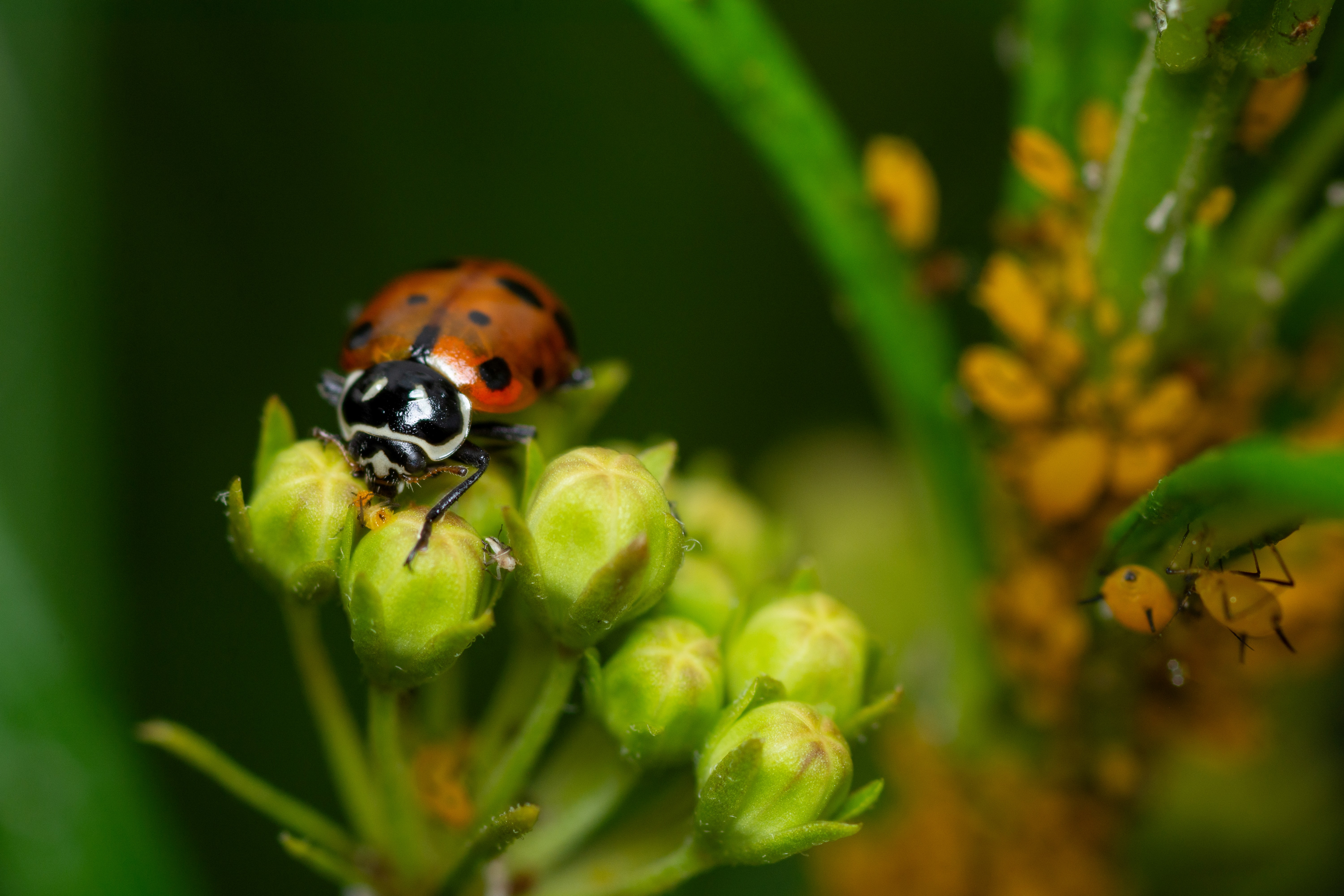
Lady bug on whorled milkweed

Aphids are often infected by bacteria, viruses, and fungi. They are affected by the weather, such as precipitation, temperature and wind. Fungi that attack aphids include Neozygites fresenii, Entomophthora, Beauveria bassiana, Metarhizium anisopliae, and entomopathogenic fungi such as Lecanicillium lecanii. Aphids brush against the microscopic spores. These stick to the aphid, germinate, and penetrate the aphid's skin. The fungus grows in the aphid's hemolymph. After about three days, the aphid dies and the fungus releases more spores into the air. Infected aphids are covered with a woolly mass that progressively grows thicker until the aphid is obscured. Often, the visible fungus is not the one that killed the aphid, but a secondary infection.

Aphids can be easily killed by unfavourable weather, such as late spring freezes. Excessive heat kills the symbiotic bacteria that some aphids depend on, which makes the aphids infertile. Rain prevents winged aphids from dispersing, and knocks aphids off plants and thus kills them from the impact or by starvation, but cannot be relied on for aphid control.

==== Anti-predator defences ====
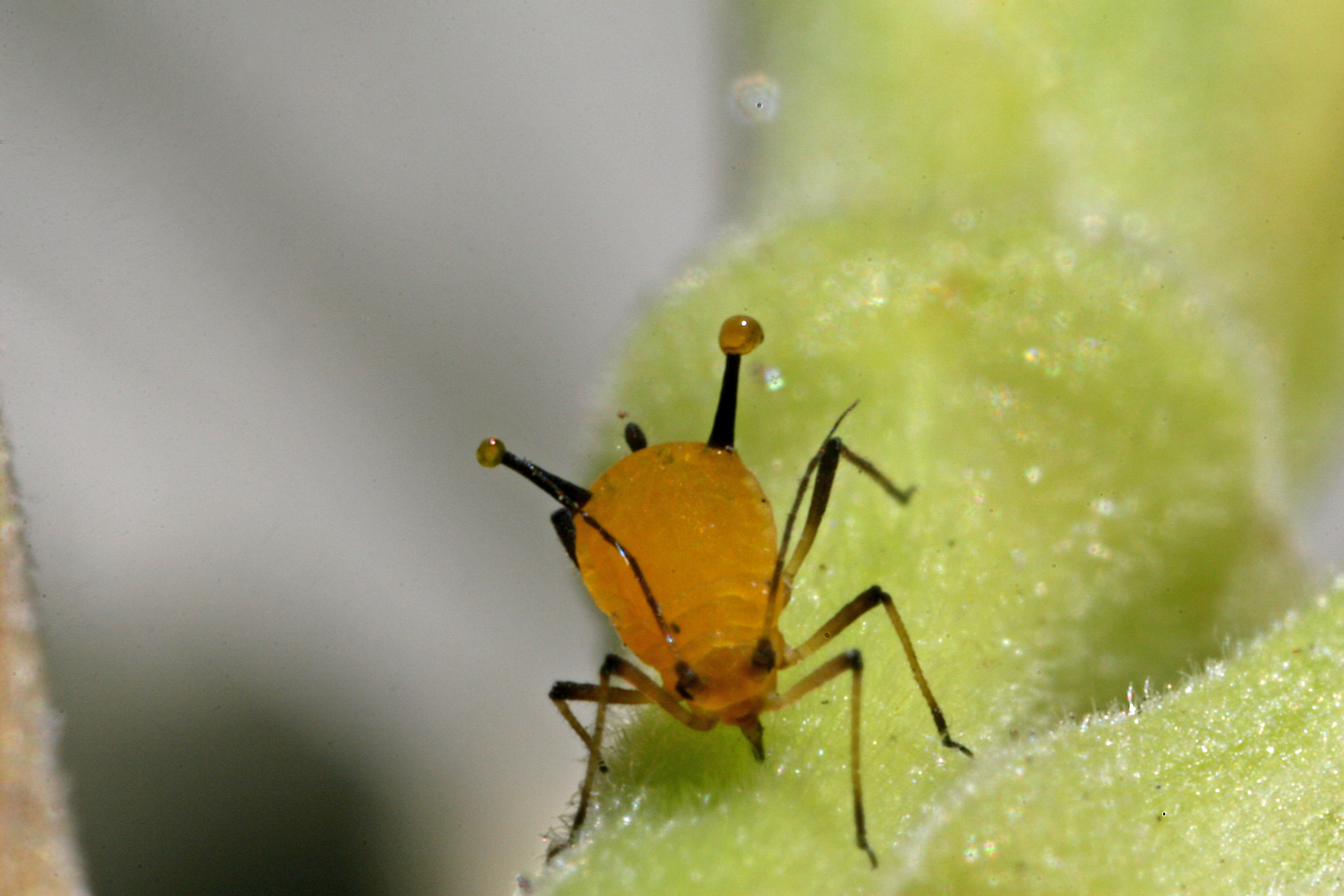
Aphid secreting defensive fluid from the cornicles

A milkweed aphid on narrow-leaf milkweed is attacked by a hoverfly larva. The aphid thrashes and releases pheromones and sticky wax from its cornicles. Nearby aphids flee. Video played at 4X speed.

Most aphids have little protection from predators. Some species interact with plant tissues forming a gall, an abnormal swelling of plant tissue. Aphids can live inside the gall, which provides protection from predators and the elements. A number of galling aphid species are known to produce specialised "soldier" forms, sterile nymphs with defensive features which defend the gall from invasion. For example, Alexander's horned aphids are a type of soldier aphid that has a hard exoskeleton and pincer-like mouthparts. A woolly aphid, Colophina clematis, has first instar "soldier" nymphs that protect the aphid colony, killing larvae of ladybirds, hoverflies and the flower bug Anthocoris nemoralis by climbing on them and inserting their stylets.

Although aphids cannot fly for most of their life cycle, they can escape predators and accidental ingestion by herbivores by dropping off the plant onto the ground. Others species use the soil as a permanent protection, feeding on the vascular systems of roots and remaining underground all their lives. They are often attended by ants, for the honeydew they produce and are carried from plant to plant by the ants through their tunnels.

Some species of aphid, known as "woolly aphids" (Eriosomatinae), excrete a "fluffy wax coating" for protection. The cabbage aphid, Brevicoryne brassicae, sequesters secondary metabolites from its host, stores them and releases chemicals that produce a violent chemical reaction and strong mustard oil smell to repel predators. Peptides produced by aphids, thaumatins, are thought to provide them with resistance to some fungi.

It was common at one time to suggest that the cornicles were the source of the honeydew, and this was even included in the Shorter Oxford English Dictionary and the 2008 edition of the World Book Encyclopedia. In fact, honeydew secretions are produced from the anus of the aphid, while cornicles mostly produce defensive chemicals such as waxes. There also is evidence of cornicle wax attracting aphid predators in some cases.

Some clones of Aphis craccivora are sufficiently toxic to the invasive and dominant predatory ladybird Harmonia axyridis to suppress it locally, favouring other ladybird species; the toxicity is in this case narrowly specific to the dominant predator species.

=== Parasitoids ===
A milkweed aphid pushes the sticky wax drop from its cornicle against an attacking parasitic wasp, extruding another drop. Two scenes at one-tenth speed. A different aphid has captured a wasp.

Aphids are abundant and widespread, and serve as hosts to a large number of parasitoids, many of them being very small (c. 0.1 inches (2.5 mm) long) parasitoid wasps. One species, Aphis ruborum, for example, is host to at least 12 species of parasitoid wasps. Parasitoids have been investigated intensively as biological control agents, and many are used commercially for this purpose.

=== Plant-aphid interactions ===
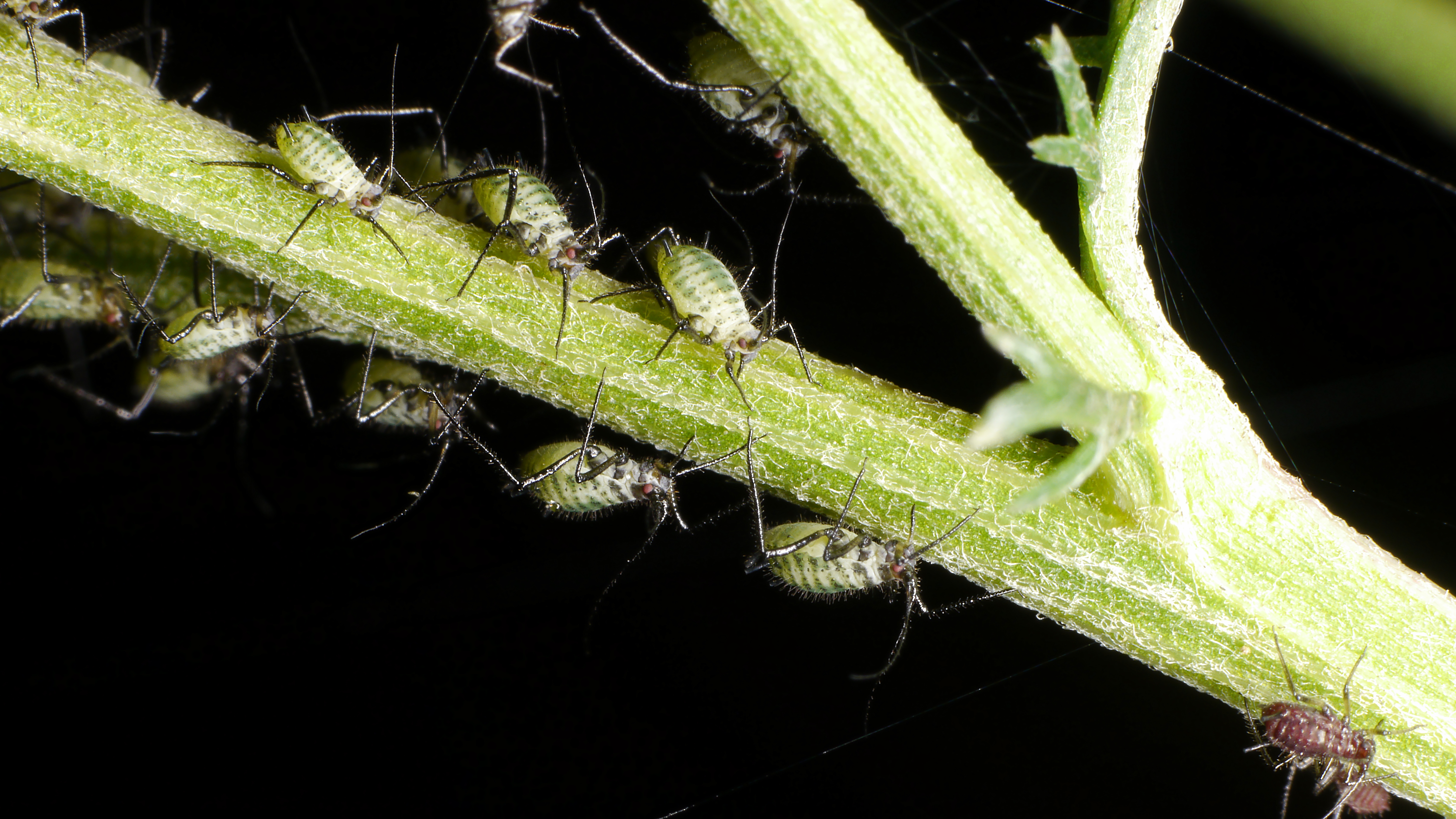
Aphids on plant host

Plants mount local and systemic defenses against aphid attack. Young leaves in some plants contain chemicals that discourage attack while the older leaves have lost this resistance, while in other plant species, resistance is acquired by older tissues and the young shoots are vulnerable. Volatile products from interplanted onions have been shown to prevent aphid attack on adjacent potato plants by encouraging the production of terpenoids, a benefit exploited in the traditional practice of companion planting, while plants neighboring infested plants showed increased root growth at the expense of the extension of aerial parts. The wild potato, Solanum berthaultii, produces an aphid alarm pheromone, (E)-β-farnesene, as an allomone, a pheromone to ward off attack; it effectively repels the aphid Myzus persicae at a range of up to 3 millimetres. S. berthaultii and other wild potato species have a further anti-aphid defence in the form of glandular hairs which, when broken by aphids, discharge a sticky liquid that can immobilise some 30% of the aphids infesting a plant.

Plants exhibiting aphid damage can have a variety of symptoms, such as decreased growth rates, mottled leaves, yellowing, stunted growth, curled leaves, browning, wilting, low yields, and death. The removal of sap creates a lack of vigor in the plant, and aphid saliva is toxic to plants. Aphids frequently transmit plant viruses to their hosts, such as to potatoes, cereals, sugarbeets, and citrus plants. There are two types of virus transmission between plant-aphid interactions: non-circulative transmission and circulative transmission. In non-circulative transmission, the virus attaches itself to the aphids mouthparts and is released when the aphids feed on a different plant. These non-circulatory transmitted viruses promotes rapid dispersion of the vector, or aphids. In circulative transmission, the virus is ingested and passes through the gut lining to enter the hemolymph, where it is then circulated throughout the entire body. After reaching the salivary glands, the virus is then released into the saliva upon transmission sites in plants. Circulatory transmitted viruses allows for long-term feeding by the aphids and increases the chances of being infected with the virus. The green peach aphid, Myzus persicae, is a vector for more than 110 plant viruses. Cotton aphids (Aphis gossypii) often infect sugarcane, papaya and peanuts with viruses. In plants which produce the phytoestrogen coumestrol, such as alfalfa, damage by aphids is linked with higher concentrations of coumestrol.

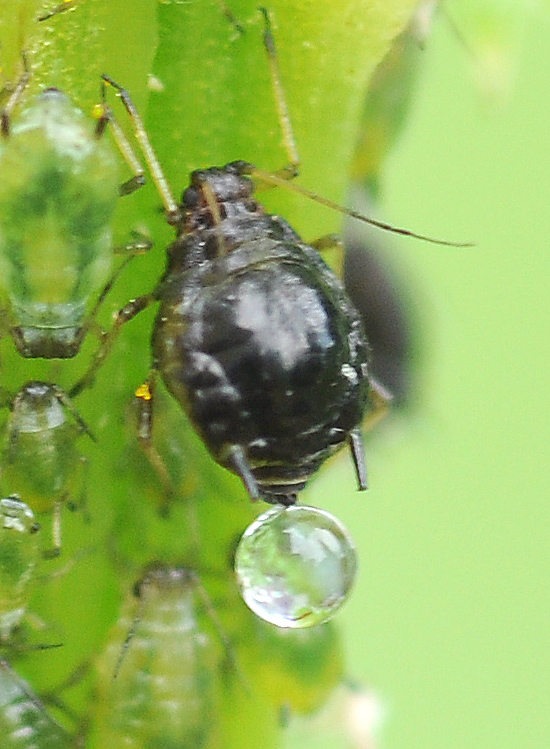
Aphid with honeydew, from the anus, not the cornicles

The coating of plants with honeydew can contribute to the spread of fungi which can damage plants. Honeydew produced by aphids has been observed to reduce the effectiveness of fungicides as well.

A hypothesis that insect feeding may improve plant fitness was floated in the mid-1970s by Owen and Wiegert. It was felt that the excess honeydew would nourish soil micro-organisms, including nitrogen fixers. In a nitrogen-poor environment, this could provide an advantage to an infested plant over an uninfested plant. However, this does not appear to be supported by observational evidence.

== Sociality ==
Some aphids show some of the traits of eusociality, joining insects such as ants, bees, and termites. However, there are differences between these sexual social insects and the clonal aphids, which are all descended from a single female parthenogenetically and share an identical genome. About fifty species of aphid, scattered among the closely related, host-alternating lineages Eriosomatinae and Hormaphidinae, have some type of defensive morph. These are gall-creating species, with the colony living and feeding inside a gall that they form in the host's tissues. Among the clonal population of these aphids, there may be several distinct morphs and this lays the foundation for a possible specialization of function, in this case, a defensive caste. The soldier morphs are mostly first and second instars with the third instar being involved in Eriosoma moriokense and only in Smythurodes betae are adult soldiers known. The hind legs of soldiers are clawed, heavily sclerotized and the stylets are robust making it possible to rupture and crush small predators. The larval soldiers are altruistic individuals, unable to advance to breeding adults but acting permanently in the interests of the colony. Another requirement for the development of sociality is provided by the gall, a colonial home to be defended by the soldiers.

The soldiers of gall-forming aphids also carry out the job of cleaning the gall. The honeydew secreted by the aphids is coated in a powdery wax to form "liquid marbles" that the soldiers roll out of the gall through small orifices. Aphids that form closed galls use the plant's vascular system for their plumbing: the inner surfaces of the galls are highly absorbent and wastes are absorbed and carried away by the plant.

== Interactions with humans ==
=== Pest status ===
About 5000 species of aphid have been described and of these, some 450 species have colonized food and fiber crops. As direct feeders on plant sap, they damage crops and reduce yields, but they have a greater impact by being vectors of plant viruses. The transmission of these viruses depends on the movements of aphids between different parts of a plant, between nearby plants, and further afield. In this respect, the probing behavior of an aphid tasting a host is more damaging than lengthy aphid feeding and reproduction by stay-put individuals. The movement of aphids influences the timing of virus epidemics. They are major pests of greenhouse crops and species often encountered in greenhouses include: green peach aphid (Myzus persicae), cotton or melon aphid (Aphis gossypii), potato aphid (Macrosiphum euphorbiae), foxglove aphid (Aulacorthum solani) and chrysanthemum aphid (Macrosiphoniella sanborni) and others, which cause leaf yellowing, distorted leaves, and plant stunting; the excreted honeydew is a growing medium for a number of fungal pathogens including black sooty molds from the genera Capnodium, Fumago, and Scorias which then infect leaves and inhibit growth by reducing photosynthesis.

Aphids, especially during large outbreaks, have been known to trigger allergic inhalant reactions in sensitive humans.

Dispersal can be by walking or flight, appetitive dispersal, or by migration. Winged aphids are weak fliers, lose their wings after a few days and only fly by day. Dispersal by flight is affected by the impact, air currents, gravity, precipitation, and other factors, or dispersal may be accidental, caused by the movement of plant materials, animals, farm machinery, vehicles, or aircraft.

=== Control ===
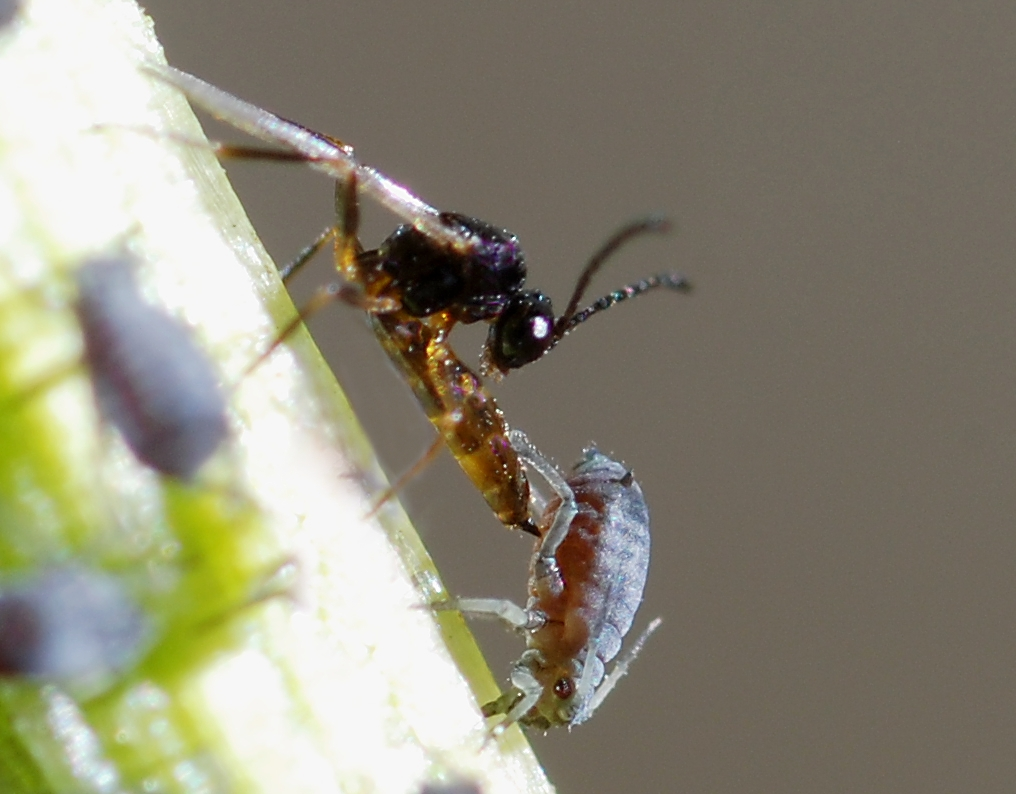
Parasitoid braconid wasp ovipositing in black bean aphid

Insecticide control of aphids is difficult, as they breed rapidly, so even small areas missed may enable the population to recover promptly. Aphids may occupy the undersides of leaves where spray misses them, while systemic insecticides do not move satisfactorily into flower petals. Finally, some aphid species are resistant to common insecticide classes including carbamates, organophosphates, and pyrethroids.

For small backyard infestations, spraying plants thoroughly with a strong water jet every few days may be sufficient protection. An insecticidal soap solution can be an effective household remedy to control aphids, but it only kills aphids on contact and has no residual effect. Soap spray may damage plants, especially at higher concentrations or at temperatures above 32 °C (90 °F); some plant species are sensitive to soap sprays.

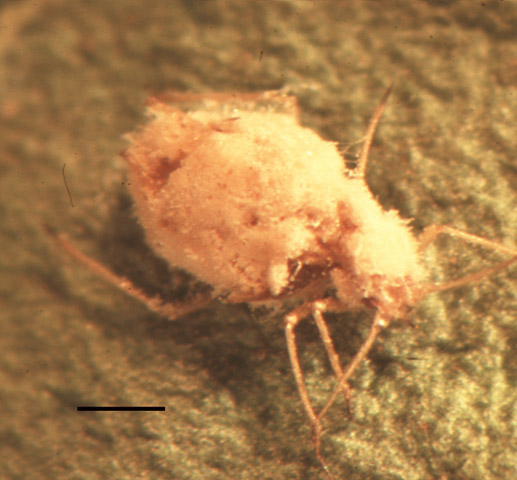
Green peach aphid, Myzus persicae, killed by the fungus Pandora neoaphidis (Entomophthorales)

Aphid populations can be sampled using yellow-pan or Moericke traps. These are yellow containers with water that attract aphids. Aphids respond positively to green and their attraction to yellow may not be a true colour preference but related to brightness. Their visual receptors peak in sensitivity from 440 to 480 nm and are insensitive in the red region. Moericke found that aphids avoided landing on white coverings placed on soil and were repelled even more by shiny aluminium surfaces. Integrated pest management of various species of aphids can be achieved using biological insecticides based on fungi such as Lecanicillium lecanii, Beauveria bassiana or Isaria fumosorosea. Fungi are the main pathogens of aphids; Entomophthorales can quickly cut aphid numbers in nature.

Aphids may also be controlled by the release of natural enemies, in particular lady beetles and parasitoid wasps. However, since adult lady beetles tend to fly away within 48 hours after release, without laying eggs, repeated applications of large numbers of lady beetles are needed to be effective. For example, one large, heavily infested rose bush may take two applications of 1500 beetles each.

The ability to produce allomones such as farnesene to repel and disperse aphids and to attract their predators has been experimentally transferred to transgenic Arabidopsis thaliana plants using an Eβf synthase gene in the hope that the approach could protect transgenic crops. Eβ farnesene has however found to be ineffective in crop situations although stabler synthetic forms help improve the effectiveness of control using fungal spores and insecticides through increased uptake caused by movements of aphids.

=== In human culture ===
Aphids are familiar to farmers and gardeners, mainly as pests. Peter Marren and Richard Mabey record that Gilbert White described an invading "army" of black aphids that arrived in his village of Selborne, Hampshire, England, in August 1774 in "great clouds", covering every plant, while in the unusually hot summer of 1783, White found that honeydew was so abundant as to "deface and destroy the beauties of my garden", though he thought the aphids were consuming rather than producing it.

Infestation of the Chinese sumac (Rhus chinensis) by Chinese sumac aphids (Schlechtendalia chinensis) can create "Chinese galls" which are valued as a commercial product. As "Galla Chinensis", they are used in traditional Chinese medicine to treat coughs, diarrhea, night sweats, dysentery and to stop intestinal and uterine bleeding. Chinese galls are also an important source of tannins.

== See also ==
- Aeroplankton
- Economic entomology
- Non-human agriculture
- Pineapple gall
