= Cretamyzidae =

Cretamyzidae Temporal range: Campanian

Scientific classification
- Kingdom: Animalia
- Phylum: Arthropoda
- Clade: Pancrustacea
- Class: Insecta
- Order: Hemiptera
- Suborder: Sternorrhyncha
- Superfamily: Aphidoidea
- Family: †Cretamyzidae; Heie, 1992

Extinct family of true bugs

Cretamyzidae is an extinct insect family in the aphid superfamily (Aphidoidea), of the order Hemiptera. It contains the single genus Cretamyzus, known from the Upper Cretaceous of Canada. The type species C. pikei was described from the Upper Campanian Grassy Lake amber from the Foremost Formation. Another indeterminate specimen of the genus was found in amber in the Dinosaur Park Formation associated with a Prosaurolophus dentary.
