= Torulene =

Names
- IUPAC name 3′,4′-Didehydro-β,ψ-carotene
- Systematic IUPAC name 2-[(1E,3E,5E,7E,9E,11E,13E,15E,17E,19E,21E)-3,7,12,16,20,24-Hexamethylpentacosa-1,3,5,7,9,11,13,15,17,19,21,23-dodecaen-1-yl]-1,3,3-trimethylcyclohex-1-ene

Identifiers
| CAS Number | 547-23-9 |
| 3D model (JSmol) | Interactive image |
| ChemSpider | 4444665 |
| PubChem CID | 5281253 |
| UNII | 7KKR9CWX9P |
| CompTox Dashboard (EPA) | DTXSID901029634 |
- InChI: InChI=1S/C40H54/c1-32(2)18-13-21-35(5)24-15-26-36(6)25-14-22-33(3)19-11-12-20-34(4)23-16-27-37(7)29-30-39-38(8)28-17-31-40(39,9)10/h11-16,18-27,29-30H,17,28,31H2,1-10H3/b12-11+,21-13+,22-14+,23-16+,26-15+,30-29+,33-19+,34-20+,35-24+,36-25+,37-27+ Key: AIBOHNYYKWYQMM-MXBSLTGDSA-N
- SMILES: C(/C1=C(/CCCC1(C)C)C)=C\C(=C\C=C\C(=C\C=C\C=C(\C=C\C=C(\C=C\C=C(\C=C\C=C(/C)C)C)C)C)C)C

Properties
| Chemical formula | C_{40}H_{54} |
| Molar mass | 534.857 |
- Except where otherwise noted, data are given for materials in their standard state (at 25 °C [77 °F], 100 kPa). Infobox references

Torulene (3',4'-didehydro-β,γ-carotene) is a carotene (a hydrocarbon carotenoid) which is notable for being synthesized by red pea aphids (Acyrthosiphon pisum), imparting the natural red color to the aphids, which aids in their camouflage and escape from predation. The aphids have gained the ability to synthesize torulene by horizontal gene transfer of a number of genes for carotenoid synthesis, apparently from fungi. Plants, fungi, and microorganisms can synthesize carotenoids, but torulene made by pea aphids is the only carotenoid known to be synthesized by an organism in the animal kingdom at the time of its discovery (2010).

In 2012, the spider mite Tetranychus urticae was found to produce its own caretinoids using homologous genes, likely derived from similar fungi. In 2013, the Acyrthosiphon caretinoid synthesis genes were found to be present in aphid relatives, adelgids and phylloxerids.
