= Colophina clematis =

Scientific classification
- Domain: Eukaryota
- Kingdom: Animalia
- Phylum: Arthropoda
- Class: Insecta
- Order: Hemiptera
- Suborder: Sternorrhyncha
- Family: Aphididae
- Genus: Colophina
- Species: C. clematis

Binomial name
- Colophina clematis (Shinji, 1922)

Species of true bug

Colophina clematis is a species of aphid in the woolly aphid subfamily, Eriosomatinae, native to Japan. This woolly aphid has the distinction of being the first species of aphid to have been identified as having a "soldier" caste. First instar nymphs of this type are able to protect the aphid colony, killing the larvae of predatory ladybirds, hoverflies and the flower bug Anthocoris nemoralis.

== Description ==
The aphids and nymphs are grey in colour with tufts of white extruded wax. There are two forms of first instar nymphs. The primary-type nymphs have long rostra and legs of approximately equal length; they feed and continue to grow and develop into adults. The secondary-type nymphs have short rostra and the front two pairs of legs are enlarged; they have never been known to grow beyond the first instar stage.

== Ecology ==
The deciduous, three-leaf clematis Clematis apiifolia is used during the summer by C. clematis as its secondary host species. The aphids form a cluster in a shady area near the base of the climbing plant. During the summer, wingless females produce primary-type nymphs by parthenogenesis (live birth). These also reproduce parthenogenetically, but some of the offspring develop into secondary-type nymphs. These neither grow nor develop further and guard the colony, killing predatory larvae of ladybirds, hoverflies and the flower bug Anthocoris nemoralis. To do this, the secondary-type nymphs climb onto the intruder and some insert their stylets into it. The intruder wriggles and falls to the ground where it is further attacked by walking secondary-type nymphs and dies within a few hours. In the autumn some winged adult aphids are produced which migrate to an unknown primary host plant. In late autumn only primary-type first instar nymphs are produced and these overwinter in cracks in the bark or among moss. It is not known whether these are the source of the following year's colonies, or whether the migratory insects are.

Further research has disclosed that the primary host for this social aphid is a plant in the family Ulmaceae, often Zelkova. On this host the aphids form galls and some of the second instar nymphs form a soldier caste. The proportion of soldiers is higher in large colonies on the primary host, and the soldier nymphs differ from those on the secondary host in being capable of moulting and developing into adults.
