= Hamiltonella =

Scientific classification (Candidatus)
- Domain: Bacteria
- Phylum: Pseudomonadota
- Class: Gammaproteobacteria
- Order: Enterobacterales
- Family: Enterobacteriaceae
- Genus: Candidatus Hamiltonella Moran et al., 2005

Genus of bacteria

Hamiltonella is a genus of Enterobacteria in the Gammaproteobacteria. Hamiltonella defensa is a model organism for defensive symbiosis, protecting pea aphids from parasitoid wasps. Hamiltonella has also been found as a nutritional mutualistic endosymbiont in Whiteflies.
