= Volker Moericke =

German professor of applied entomology

Volker Moericke (22 December 1913 – 8 June 1981) was a German professor of applied entomology at the University of Bonn. He discovered colour vision in aphids and innovated the use of yellow-pan traps (which also go by the name of Moericke traps) to monitor aphids numbers.

Moericke was born in Mannheim and grew up in Konstanz. He studied sciences at Munich, Freiburg, Göttingen and Bonn. He received a doctorate in 1940 under Hans Blunck. In 1941 he was called to military service and returned to research at the University of Freiburg after the war. His research on sensory ecology and behaviour on aphids in potato crops led to the innovation in 1951 of yellow-pan traps which are sometimes known as Moericke traps.

Moericke also had an interest in birds and spent many mornings with his students on outdoor excursions.
