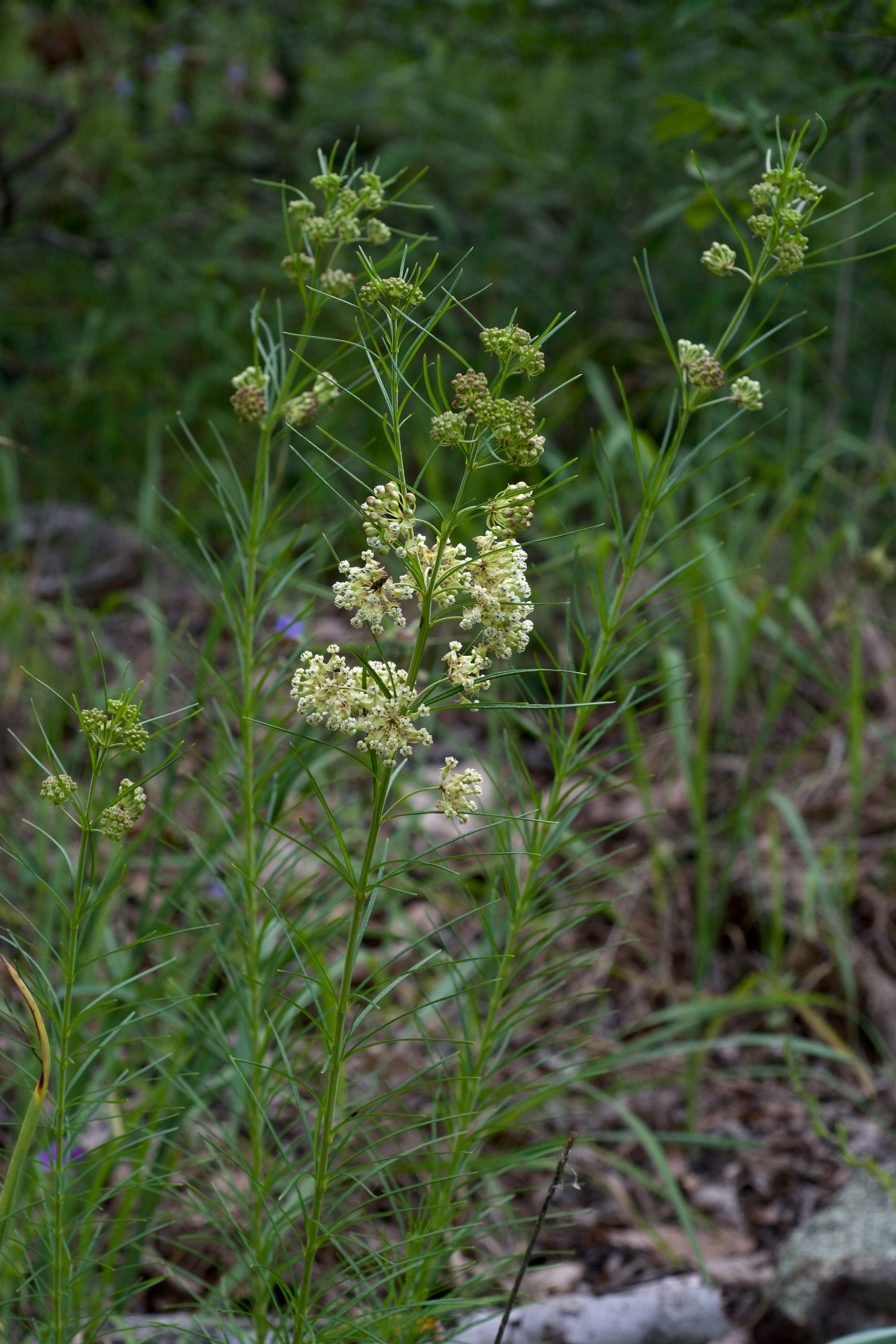

Conservation status
- Secure (NatureServe)

Scientific classification
- Kingdom: Plantae
- Clade: Embryophytes
- Clade: Tracheophytes
- Clade: Angiosperms
- Clade: Eudicots
- Clade: Asterids
- Order: Gentianales
- Family: Apocynaceae
- Genus: Asclepias
- Species: A. verticillata

Binomial name
- Asclepias verticillata L.

= Asclepias verticillata =

Species of flowering plant

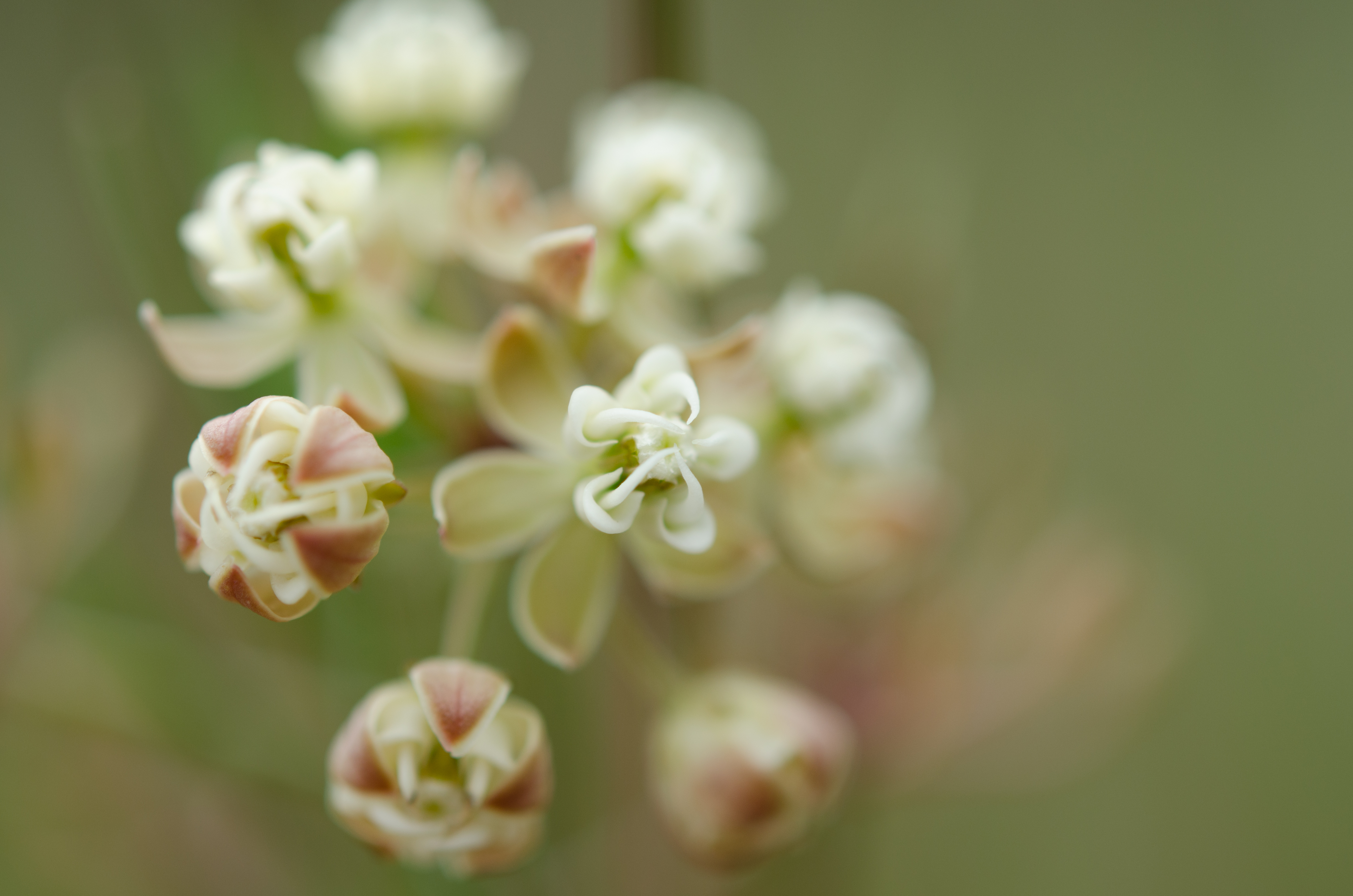

Asclepias verticillata, the whorled milkweed, eastern whorled milkweed, or horsetail milkweed, is a species of milkweed native to most of eastern North America and parts of western Canada and the United States.

== Description ==
This is a perennial herb with a single stem 6 inches to 3 feet tall. The very narrow, linear leaves are arranged in whorls of 4–6 with short internodes. The inflorescence is an umbel of 7–20 greenish white flowers. The Latin specific epithet verticillata is in reference to the leaves appearing in whorls.

== Ecology ==
=== Habitat ===
A. verticillata is native to habitats such as loblolly pine plantations, upland pine-hardwood communities, and glades, among others. This species has also been found along roadsides.

It is limited to primarily sandy soils, and requires light levels between full sunlight and partial shade. It can grow in either xeric or moist conditions.

=== Phenology ===
This species' flowers are fragrant and bloom between June and September, with peak inflorescence occurring in August. It has been found to fruit within the same period.

=== Fire Ecology ===
As A. verticillata is native to several habitat types that experience a fire regime, many individuals are subject to repeated annuals burns. This species has been found to persist through burns, and increase in frequency as a response to repeated prescribed fires.

=== Pollination, herbivory, and toxicology ===
This species can reproduce vegetatively and does not depend on pollinators, but it does produce some nectar, mostly in the early evening hours. Insect visitors to the plant include wasps, honeybees, and lepidopterans such as moths and the cabbage white. Like other milkweed species, this plant is a host plant for the monarch butterfly whose caterpillars feed on the leaves.

The plant is toxic to livestock.

== Uses ==
It was used as a medicinal plant by Native American peoples. The Choctaw used it to treat snakebite, the Lakota and Hopi used it to increase breast milk in nursing mothers, and the Navajo used it for nose and throat problems.
