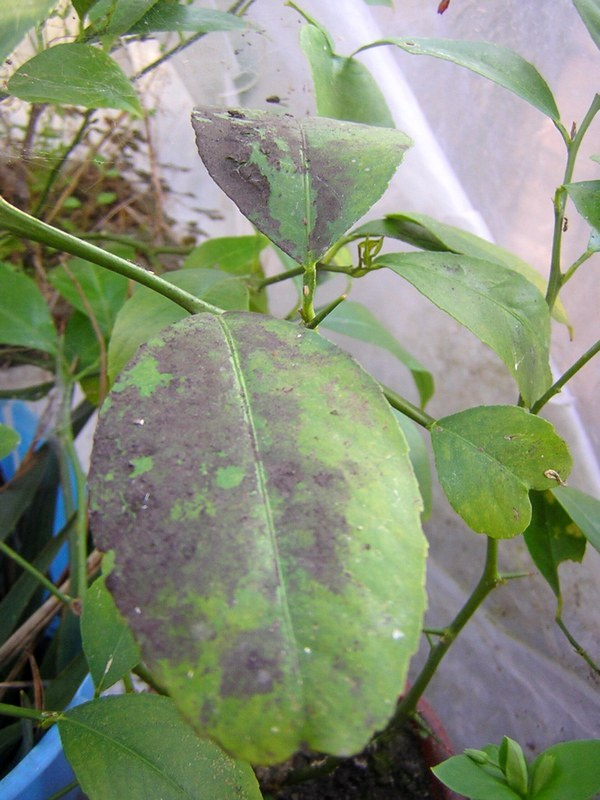
- Fumago salicina on a lemon leaf

Scientific classification
- Domain: Eukaryota
- Kingdom: Fungi
- Division: Ascomycota
- Class: Dothideomycetes
- Order: Capnodiales
- Family: Capnodiaceae
- Genus: Fumago; Pers., 1822

= Fumago =

Genus of fungi

Fumago is a genus of fungi belonging to the family Capnodiaceae.

The species of this genus are found in Europe and Northern America.

Species:

- Fumago crustacea Sacc., 1880
- Fumago donatiae B.Chandler
- Fumago fungicola Sacc.
- Fumago graminis (Corda) S.Hughes
- Fumago hebbalensis A.N.S.Rao
- Fumago ilicis Pers.
- Fumago lateritiorum Sacc., 1880
- Fumago lauri G.Boyer & Jacz., 1893
- Fumago lonicerae Fuckel
- Fumago oleae Tul.
- Fumago oosperma Speg.
- Fumago pannosa Berk.
- Fumago sacchari Speg.
- Fumago salicina (Pers.) Tul. & C.Tul.
- Fumago setulosa Lév.
- Fumago sorbina (P.Karst.) S.Hughes
- Fumago typhae Pers.
