= Serratia symbiotica =

Scientific classification
- Domain: Bacteria
- Kingdom: Pseudomonadati
- Phylum: Pseudomonadota
- Class: Gammaproteobacteria
- Order: Enterobacterales
- Family: Yersiniaceae
- Genus: Serratia
- Species: S. symbiotica

Binomial name
- Serratia symbiotica Moran et al., 2005

Species of bacterium

Serratia symbiotica is a species of bacteria that lives as a symbiont of aphids. In the aphid Cinara cedri, it coexists with Buchnera aphidicola, given the latter cannot produce tryptophan. It is also known to habitate in Aphis fabae. Together with other endosymbionts, it provides aphids protection against parasitoids.
