= Ambidensovirus =

Extinct genus of viruses

Ambidensovirus was a genus of viruses in the subfamily Densovirinae. In 2019, the genus was split into the following six genera, all of which still contain the name ambidensovirus and which are assigned to the same subfamily:

- Aquambidensovirus
- Blattambidensovirus
- Hemiambidensovirus
- Pefuambidensovirus
- Protoambidensovirus
- Scindoambidensovirus
