= Hamiltonella defensa =

Scientific classification (Candidatus)
- Domain: Bacteria
- Phylum: Pseudomonadota
- Class: Gammaproteobacteria
- Order: Enterobacterales
- Family: Enterobacteriaceae
- Genus: Hamiltonella
- Species: H. defensa

Binomial name
- Hamiltonella defensa Moran et al., 2005

Species of bacterium

Hamiltonella defensa (H. defensa) is a species of bacteria. It is maternally or sexually transmitted and lives as an endosymbiont of whiteflies and aphids, meaning that it lives within a host, protecting its host from attack. It does this through bypassing the host's immune responses by protecting its host against parasitoid wasps. However, H. defensa is only defensive if infected by a virus. H. defensa shows a relationship with Photorhabdus species, together with Regiella insecticola. Together with other endosymbionts, it provides aphids protection against parasitoids. It is known to habitate Bemisia tabaci.

H. defensa is a member of the family Enterobacteriaceae. It can be found both extracellularly and intracellulary in H. defensa itself, and also the bacteriocytes. It is a gram-negative bacteria and has been found to have six distinct secretion systems that mediate the export of protein through the inner and outer membranes. In general, "Candidatus Hamiltonella defensa's" functions are relatively unknown, and the H. defensa's discovery was not specified by a particular person.

H. defensa's draft genome sequence was first discovered in the B. tabaci complex of the "Candidatus Hamiltonella defensa". This is only found in two invasive cryptic species: Mediterranean and Middle East-Asia.

The H. defensa is significantly smaller (at 1.84-Mpb) than its bacteria relatives; Yersinia and Serratia species. It is also dependent on the essential amino acids produced by Buchnera. It is autotrophic for eight out of the ten essential amino acids that Buchnera produces. Although dependent, the H. defensa genome preserves more genes and pathways for cell structures and processes, than that of obligate symbionts. It also has several abundances: toxin homologs, encoding type-3 secretion systems, and putative pathogenicity loci. Additionally, H. defensa holds mobile DNA, like phage-derived genes, plasmids, and insertion-sequence elements, that feature H. defensa's dynamicness, and also show the role horizontal gene transfer has on shaping it. The H. defensa genome holds a 2,110,331-bp circular chromosome and a 59,034-bp conjugative plasmid. The chromosome carries a canonical origin of replication. It has notably more cell structure, DNA replication, recombination, and repair of genes than obligate endosymbionts, despite its limited biosynthetic abilities. The proteins present in H. defensa vary in length significantly. They have a double cycled nonapeptide sequence involved in binding calcium.

== Special properties ==
H. defensa has two types of type-3 secretion systems (T3SS). These translocation systems are typically used by pathogens to occupy host cells and elude immune responses. They are also necessary for the perseverance of certain symbiosis.

There have been recent studies done attempting to find ways to manipulate H.defensa's "self-fighting" qualities, and create a cure for certain illnesses.
