= Regiella insecticola =

Scientific classification (Candidatus)
- Domain: Bacteria
- Phylum: Pseudomonadota
- Class: Gammaproteobacteria
- Order: Enterobacterales
- Family: Enterobacteriaceae
- Genus: Regiella
- Species: R. insecticola

Binomial name
- Regiella insecticola Moran et al., 2005

Species of bacterium

Regiella insecticola is a species of bacteria, that lives as a symbiont of aphids. It shows a relationship with Photorhabdus species, together with Hamiltonella defensa. Together with other endosymbionts, it provides aphids protection against parasitoids.
