= List of Aphis species =

This is a list of 609 species in Aphis, a genus of aphids in the family Aphididae.

== Aphis species ==
- Aphis aba ^{c g}
- Aphis acaenaevora Mier Durante & Ortego, 1998^{c g}
- Aphis acaenovinae Eastop, 1961^{c g}
- Aphis acanthoidis (Börner, 1940)^{c g}
- Aphis acanthopanaci Matsumura, 1917^{c g}
- Aphis acetosae Linnaeus, 1767^{c g}
- Aphis achillearadicis Pashtshenko, 1992^{c g}
- Aphis achyranthi Theobald, F.V., 1929^{c g}
- Aphis acrita Smith, C.F., 1940^{c g}
- Aphis acuminata Nieto Nafría & von Dohlen, 2016^{c g}
- Aphis adesmiae Delfino, 2009^{c g}
- Aphis affinis Del Guercio, 1911^{c g}
- Aphis agastachyos Hille Ris Lambers, 1974^{c g}
- Aphis agrariae ^{c g}
- Aphis albella ^{c g}
- Aphis alchemillae (Börner, 1940)^{c g}
- Aphis alhagis (Zhang, Guangxue, Xiaolin Chen, Tiesen Zhong & Jin^{c g}
- Aphis alienus ^{c g}
- Aphis alstroemeriae Essig, 1953^{c g}
- Aphis althaeae (Nevsky, 1929)^{c g}
- Aphis amaranthi Holman, 1974^{c g}
- Aphis angelicae ^{c g}
- Aphis antherici ^{c g}
- Aphis apigraveolens Essig, 1938^{c g}
- Aphis apocynicola ^{c g}
- Aphis aquilonalis Stekolshchikov & Khruleva, 2015^{c g}
- Aphis araliaeradicis (Strom, 1938)^{c g}
- Aphis arbuti Ferrari, 1872^{c g}
- Aphis arctiumi ^{c g}
- Aphis argrimoniae ^{c g}
- Aphis armata ^{c g}
- Aphis artemifoliae Shinji, 1922^{c g}
- Aphis artemisiphaga Holman, 1987^{c g}
- Aphis artemisiphila Holman, 1987^{c g}
- Aphis artemisivora ^{c g}
- Aphis asclepiadis Fitch, 1851^{c g b}
- Aphis astericola Tissot, 1933^{c g}
- Aphis astilbes Matsumura, 1917^{c g}
- Aphis astragali Ossiannilsson, 1959^{c g}
- Aphis astragalicola ^{c g}
- Aphis astragalina Hille Ris Lambers, 1974^{c g}
- Aphis atromaculata Hille Ris Lambers, 1974^{c g}
- Aphis atuberculata Hille Ris Lambers, 1955^{c g}
- Aphis aubletia Sanborn, 1904^{c g}
- Aphis aurantii Boyer de Fonscolombe, 1841^{c g}
- Aphis austriaca Hille Ris Lambers, 1959^{c g}
- Aphis axyriphaga Pashtshenko, 1993^{c g}
- Aphis axyriradicis Pashtshenko, 1993^{c g}
- Aphis baccharicola Hille Ris Lambers, 1974^{c g}
- Aphis ballotae Passerini, 1860^{c g}
- Aphis balloticola Szelegiewicz, 1968^{g}
- Aphis berberidorum Ortego & Mier Durante, 1997^{c g}
- Aphis beringiensis Stekolshchikov & Khruleva, 2015^{c g}
- Aphis berlinskii Huculak, 1968^{c g}
- Aphis berteroae Szelegiewicz, 1966^{c g}
- Aphis biobiensis Nieto Nafría & Mier Durante, 2016^{c g}
- Aphis boydstoni Pike, 2004^{c g}
- Aphis bozhkoae Eastop & Blackman, 2005^{c g}
- Aphis brachychaeta ^{c g}
- Aphis brachysiphon ^{c g}
- Aphis breviseta ^{c g}
- Aphis brevitarsis Szelegiewicz, 1963^{c g}
- Aphis brohmeri Börner, 1952^{c g}
- Aphis brotericola Mier Durante, 1978^{c g}
- Aphis brunellae Schouteden, 1903^{c g}
- Aphis brunnea Ferrari, 1872^{c g}
- Aphis bupleuri (Börner, 1932)^{c g}
- Aphis bupleurisensoriata ^{c g}
- Aphis cacaliasteris Hille Ris Lambers, 1947^{c g}
- Aphis calaminthae (Börner, 1952)^{c g}
- Aphis caliginosa Hottes & Frison, 1931^{c g}
- Aphis callunae ^{c g}
- Aphis canae Williams, T.A., 1911^{c g}
- Aphis caprifoliae ^{c g}
- Aphis carduella Walsh, 1863^{b}
- Aphis cari Essig, 1917^{c g}
- Aphis caroliboerneri (Remaudière, G., 1952)^{c g}
- Aphis carrilloi Ortego, Mier Durante & Nieto Nafría, 2013^{c g}
- Aphis carverae Hales, Foottit & Maw, 2014^{c g}
- Aphis caryopteridis ^{c g}
- Aphis catalpae ^{c g}
- Aphis ceanothi Clarke, 1903^{c g}
- Aphis celastrii Matsumura, 1917^{c g}
- Aphis celtis Shinji, 1922^{c g}
- Aphis cephalanthi Thomas, C., 1878^{c g b}
- Aphis cephalariae Barjadze, 2011^{c g}
- Aphis cerasi ^{c g}
- Aphis cerastii (Börner, 1950)^{c g}
- Aphis cercocarpi Gillette & M.A. Palmer, 1929^{c g}
- Aphis chaetosiphon (Qiao, Jianfeng Wang & Guangxue Zhang, 2008)^{c g}
- Aphis chetansapa Hottes & Frison, 1931^{c g}
- Aphis chilopsidi ^{c g}
- Aphis chloris Koch, 1854^{c g b}
- Aphis chrysothamni Wilson, H.F., 1915^{c g}
- Aphis chrysothamnicola (Gillette & M.A. Palmer, 1929)^{c g}
- Aphis ciceri ^{c g}
- Aphis cichorea ^{c g}
- Aphis cimicifugae Holman, 1987^{c g}
- Aphis cinerea Nieto Nafría & Ortego, 2002^{c g}
- Aphis cirsiioleracei (Börner, 1932)^{c g}
- Aphis cirsiphila Pashtshenko, 1992^{c g}
- Aphis cisti ^{c g}
- Aphis cisticola Leclant & G. Remaudière, 1972^{c g}
- Aphis citricidus ^{c g}
- Aphis citricola Van Der Goot, 1912^{i}
- Aphis citrina ^{c g}
- Aphis clematicola Pashtshenko, 1994^{c g}
- Aphis clematidis Koch, C.L., 1854^{c g}
- Aphis clematiphaga Pashtshenko, 1994^{c g}
- Aphis clerodendri Matsumura, 1917^{c g}
- Aphis cliftonensis Stroyan, 1964^{c g}
- Aphis clinepetae Pashtshenko, 1993^{c g}
- Aphis clinopodii Passerini, 1861^{c g}
- Aphis clydesmithi Stroyan, 1970^{c g}
- Aphis coffeata ^{c g}
- Aphis comari ^{c g}
- Aphis commensalis Stroyan, 1952^{c g}
- Aphis comodoensis ^{c g}
- Aphis comosa (Börner, 1950)^{c g}
- Aphis conflicta Nieto Nafría, Ortego & Mier Durante, 2008^{c g}
- Aphis confusa Walker, F., 1849^{c g}
- Aphis coprosmae ^{c g}
- Aphis coreopsidis (Thomas, C., 1878)^{c g b}
- Aphis coridifoliae Mier Durante & Ortego, 1999^{c g}
- Aphis cornifoliae Fitch, 1851^{c g b}
- Aphis coronillae Ferrari, 1872^{c g}
- Aphis coronopifoliae Bartholomew, P.S., 1932^{c g}
- Aphis costalis ^{c g}
- Aphis cottieri ^{c g}
- Aphis coweni Palmer, M.A., 1938^{c g}
- Aphis craccae Linnaeus, 1758^{c g b}
- Aphis craccivora Koch, 1854^{i c g b} (cowpea aphid)
- Aphis crassicauda Smith, C.F. & Eckel, 1996^{c g}
- Aphis crepidis (Börner, 1940)^{c g}
- Aphis crinosa ^{c g}
- Aphis crypta Pack & Knowlton, 1929^{c g}
- Aphis curtiseta Holman, 1998^{c g}
- Aphis cuscutae Davis, 1919^{c g}
- Aphis cuyana López Ciruelos & Ortego, 2017^{c g}
- Aphis cynoglossi ^{c g}
- Aphis cytisorum Hartig, 1841^{c g}
- Aphis danielae Remaudière, G., 1994^{c g}
- Aphis dasiphorae ^{c g}
- Aphis decepta Hottes & Frison, 1931^{c g}
- Aphis delicatula ^{c g}
- Aphis dianthi ^{c g}
- Aphis dianthiphaga Pashtshenko, 1993^{c g}
- Aphis diluta Pashtshenko, 1994^{c g}
- Aphis diospyri Thomas, C., 1879^{c g}
- Aphis dlabolai ^{c g}
- Aphis dolichii ^{c g}
- Aphis dragocephalus ^{c g}
- Aphis droserae Takahashi, R., 1921^{c g}
- Aphis dubia ^{c g}
- Aphis duckmountainensis Rojanavongse & Robinson, 1977^{c g}
- Aphis ecballii ^{c g}
- Aphis egomae Shinji, 1922^{c g}
- Aphis elatinoidei Nevsky, 1929^{c g}
- Aphis elegantula Szelegiewicz, 1963^{c g}
- Aphis epilobiaria ^{c g}
- Aphis epilobii Kaltenbach, 1843^{c g}
- Aphis equiseticola Ossiannilsson, 1964^{c g}
- Aphis erigerontis ^{c g}
- Aphis eryngiiglomerata ^{c g}
- Aphis esulae (Börner, 1940)^{c g}
- Aphis etiolata Stroyan, 1952^{c g}
- Aphis eucollinae López Ciruelos & Ortego, 2016^{c g}
- Aphis eugeniae van der Goot, 1917^{c}
- Aphis eugeniae van-der Goot, 1917^{g}
- Aphis eugenyi ^{c g}
- Aphis eupatorii Passerini, 1863^{c g}
- Aphis euphorbiae Kaltenbach, 1843^{c g}
- Aphis euphorbicola Rezwani & Lampel, 1990^{c g}
- Aphis explorata ^{c g}
- Aphis exsors ^{c g}
- Aphis fabae Scopoli, 1763^{i c g b} (black bean aphid)
- Aphis farinosa Gmelin, 1790^{c g b}
- Aphis feminea Hottes, 1930^{c g}
- Aphis filifoliae (Gillette & M.A. Palmer, 1928)^{c g}
- Aphis filipendulae Matsumura, 1917^{c g}
- Aphis fluvialis ^{c g}
- Aphis fluviatilis Bozhko, 1976^{g}
- Aphis foeniculivora Zhang, Guangxue, 1983^{c g}
- Aphis folsomii Davis, 1908^{c g b}
- Aphis forbesi Weed, 1889^{c g b} (strawberry root louse)
- Aphis frangulae Kaltenbach, 1845^{c g}
- Aphis franzi Holman, 1975^{c g}
- Aphis fraserae Gillette & M.A. Palmer, 1929^{c g}
- Aphis frisoni (Hottes, 1954)^{c g}
- Aphis fuckii Shinji, 1922^{g}
- Aphis fukii Shinji, 1922^{c g}
- Aphis fumanae Remaudière, G. & Leclant, 1972^{c g}
- Aphis funitecta (Börner, 1950)^{c g}
- Aphis galiae ^{c g}
- Aphis galiiscabri Schrank, 1801^{c g}
- Aphis gallowayi Robinson, 1991^{c g}
- Aphis genistae Scopoli, 1763^{c g}
- Aphis gentianae (Börner, 1940)^{c g}
- Aphis gerardiae (Thomas, C., 1879)^{c g}
- Aphis gerardianae ^{c g}
- Aphis glareosae ^{c g}
- Aphis globosa Pashtshenko, 1992^{c g}
- Aphis glycines Matsumura, 1917^{c g b} (soybean aphid)
- Aphis gossypii Glover, 1877^{i c g b} (cotton aphid)
- Aphis grandis ^{c g}
- Aphis grata Pashtshenko, 1994^{c g}
- Aphis gratiolae ^{c g}
- Aphis gregalis Knowlton, 1928^{c g}
- Aphis grosmannae (Börner, 1952)^{c g}
- Aphis grossulariae Kaltenbach, 1843^{c g}
- Aphis gurnetensis ^{c g}
- Aphis gutierrezis (Pack & Knowlton, 1929)^{c g}
- Aphis gypsophilae ^{c g}
- Aphis hamamelidis Pepper, 1950^{c g}
- Aphis haroi ^{c g}
- Aphis hasanica Pashtshenko, 1994^{c g}
- Aphis healyi Cottier, 1953^{c g}
- Aphis hederae Kaltenbach, 1843^{c g b} (ivy aphid)
- Aphis hederiphaga ^{c g}
- Aphis hedysari ^{c g}
- Aphis heiei Holman, 1998^{c g}
- Aphis helianthemi Ferrari, 1872^{c g}
- Aphis heraclicola ^{c g}
- Aphis hermistonii Wilson, H.F., 1915^{c g}
- Aphis herniariae Mamontova, 1963^{c g}
- Aphis hieracii Schrank, 1801^{c g}
- Aphis hillerislambersi ^{c g}
- Aphis hiltoni ^{c g}
- Aphis hispanica Hille Ris Lambers, 1959^{c g}
- Aphis holodisci Robinson, 1984^{c g}
- Aphis holoenotherae Rakauskas, 2007^{c g}
- Aphis horii Takahashi, R., 1923^{c g}
- Aphis humuli (Tseng & Tao, 1938)^{c}
- Aphis hyosciama Kittel, 1827^{g}
- Aphis hyperici Monell, 1879^{c g}
- Aphis hypericiphaga Pashtshenko, 1993^{c g}
- Aphis hypericiradicis Pashtshenko, 1993^{c g}
- Aphis hypochoeridis (Börner, 1940)^{c g}
- Aphis ichigo Shinji, 1922^{c g}
- Aphis ichigocola Shinji, 1924^{c g}
- Aphis idaei van der Goot, 1912^{c}
- Aphis idaei van-der Goot, 1912^{g}
- Aphis ilicis Kaltenbach, 1843^{c g}
- Aphis illinoiensis Shimer, 1866^{g}
- Aphis illinoisensis Shimer, 1866^{c g b} (grapevine aphid)
- Aphis impatientis Thomas, C., 1878^{c g}
- Aphis impatiphila Pashtshenko, 1993^{c g}
- Aphis impatiradicis Pashtshenko, 1993^{c g}
- Aphis incerta Nevsky, 1929^{c g}
- Aphis indigoferae Shinji, 1922^{c g}
- Aphis inedita ^{c g}
- Aphis infrequens Knowlton, 1929^{c g}
- Aphis intrusa Ortego, 1998^{c g}
- Aphis intybi Koch, C.L., 1855^{c g}
- Aphis ishkovi Kadyrbekov, 2001^{c g}
- Aphis iteae (Tissot, 1933)^{c g}
- Aphis jacetana García Prieto & Nieto Nafría, 2005^{c g}
- Aphis jacobaeae Schrank, 1801^{c g}
- Aphis jani Ferrari, 1872^{c g}
- Aphis janischi (Börner, 1940)^{c g}
- Aphis jurineae ^{c g}
- Aphis kachiae ^{c g}
- Aphis kachkoulii Remaudière, G., 1989^{c g}
- Aphis kalopanacis (Hori, 1927)^{c g}
- Aphis kamtchatica Pashtshenko, 1994^{c g}
- Aphis klimeschi (Börner, 1950)^{c g}
- Aphis kobachidzei (Rusanova, 1941)^{c g}
- Aphis kogomecola Matsumura, 1917^{c g}
- Aphis korshunovi ^{c g}
- Aphis kosarovi ^{c g}
- Aphis kurosawai Takahashi, R., 1921^{c g}
- Aphis laciniariae Gillette & M.A. Palmer, 1929^{c g}
- Aphis lactucae Shinji, 1922^{c g}
- Aphis lambersi (Börner, 1940)^{c g}
- Aphis lamiorum (Börner, 1950)^{c g}
- Aphis lantanae Koch, C.L., 1854^{c g}
- Aphis lavaterae Kittel, 1827^{g}
- Aphis leontodontis (Börner, 1950)^{c g}
- Aphis leonulii ^{c g}
- Aphis lhasaensis Zhang, Guangxue, 1981^{c g}
- Aphis lhasartemisiae Zhang, Guangxue, 1981^{c g}
- Aphis lichtensteini Leclant & G. Remaudière, 1972^{c g}
- Aphis ligulariae Holman, 1987^{c g}
- Aphis liliophaga ^{c g}
- Aphis limonicola Pashtshenko, 1993^{c g}
- Aphis lindae ^{c g}
- Aphis lini ^{c g}
- Aphis linorum ^{c g}
- Aphis lithospermi Wilson, H.F., 1915^{c g}
- Aphis longicauda (Baker, A.C., 1920)^{c g}
- Aphis longicaudata ^{c g}
- Aphis longini Huculak, 1968^{c g}
- Aphis longirostris (Börner, 1950)^{c g}
- Aphis longisetosa Basu, A.N., 1970^{c g}
- Aphis longituba Hille Ris Lambers, 1966^{c g}
- Aphis loti ^{c g}
- Aphis lotiradicis Stroyan, 1972^{c g}
- Aphis lugentis Williams, T.A., 1911^{c g}
- Aphis lupinehansoni Knowlton, 1935^{c g}
- Aphis lupini Gillette & Palmer, 1929^{c g b}
- Aphis lupoi ^{c g}
- Aphis lupuli ^{c g}
- Aphis lycopicola ^{c g}
- Aphis lysimachiae ^{c g}
- Aphis maculatae Oestlund, 1887^{c g b} (spotted poplar aphid)
- Aphis madderae Robinson, 1979^{c g}
- Aphis madronae ^{c g}
- Aphis magnoliae Macchiati, 1883^{c g}
- Aphis magnopilosa ^{c g}
- Aphis maidiradicis Forbes, 1891^{g}
- Aphis malahuina ^{c g}
- Aphis malalhuina Mier Durante, Nieto Nafría & Ortego, 2003^{c g}
- Aphis mammulata Gimingham & Hille Ris Lambers, 1949^{c g}
- Aphis mamonthovae ^{c g}
- Aphis manitobensis Robinson & Rojanavongse, 1976^{c g}
- Aphis marthae Essig, 1953^{c g}
- Aphis martinezi Nieto Nafría, Ortego & Mier Durante, 1999^{c g}
- Aphis masoni Richards, 1963^{c g}
- Aphis mastichinae Pérez Hidalgo & Nieto Nafría, 2004^{c g}
- Aphis matilei Nieto Nafría, Ortego & Mier Durante, 2000^{c g}
- Aphis matricariae Barjadze & Özdemir, 2014^{c g}
- Aphis maulensis Mier Durante & García-Tejero, 2016^{c g}
- Aphis medicaginis Koch, C.L., 1854^{c g}
- Aphis meijigusae Shinji, 1922^{c g}
- Aphis melosae Mier Durante & Ortego, 1999^{c g}
- Aphis mendocina Mier Durante, Ortego & Nieto Nafría, 2006^{c g}
- Aphis middletonii Thomas, 1879^{i}
- Aphis mimuli Oestlund, 1887^{c g}
- Aphis minima (Tissot, 1933)^{c g}
- Aphis minutissima (Gillette & M.A. Palmer, 1928)^{c g}
- Aphis mirifica (Börner, 1950)^{c g}
- Aphis mizutakarashi ^{c g}
- Aphis mizzou Lagos-Kutz & Puttler, 2012^{c g}
- Aphis mohelnensis Holman, 1998^{c g}
- Aphis molluginis (Börner, 1950)^{c g}
- Aphis monardae Oestlund, 1887^{c g}
- Aphis mongolica Szelegiewicz, 1963^{c g}
- Aphis montanicola Hille Ris Lambers, 1950^{c g}
- Aphis morae Kittel, 1827^{g}
- Aphis mori Clarke, 1903^{c g}
- Aphis morletti ^{c g}
- Aphis mulini Hille Ris Lambers, 1974^{c g}
- Aphis mulinicola Hille Ris Lambers, 1974^{c g}
- Aphis multiflorae ^{c g}
- Aphis mumfordi ^{c g}
- Aphis mutini Pashtshenko, 1994^{c g}
- Aphis myopori Macchiati, 1882^{c g}
- Aphis myrsinitidis Petrovi?-Obradovi? & Leclant, 1998^{c g}
- Aphis narzikulovi Szelegiewicz, 1963^{c g}
- Aphis nasturtii Kaltenbach, 1843^{i c g b} (buckthorn aphid)
- Aphis neilliae Oestlund, 1887^{c g}
- Aphis nelsonensis Cottier, 1953^{c g}
- Aphis neoartemisiphila Pashtshenko, 1992^{c g}
- Aphis neogillettei Palmer, 1938^{c g b}
- Aphis neomexicana (Cockerell, W.P. & T.D.A. Cockerell, 1901)^{c g}
- Aphis neomonardae Rojanavongse & Robinson, 1977^{c g}
- Aphis neonewtoni Pashtshenko, 1993^{c g}
- Aphis neopolygoni ^{c g}
- Aphis neospiraeae ^{c g}
- Aphis neothalictri Pashtshenko, 1994^{c g}
- Aphis nepetae Kaltenbach, 1843^{c g}
- Aphis nerii Fonscolombe, 1841^{i c g b} (oleander aphid)
- Aphis nevskyi ^{c g}
- Aphis newtoni ^{c g}
- Aphis nigra (Wilson, H.F., 1911)^{c g}
- Aphis nigratibialis Robinson, 1969^{c g}
- Aphis nivalis Hille Ris Lambers, 1960^{c g}
- Aphis nonveilleri Petrovi?-Obradovi? & G. Remaudière, 2002^{c g}
- Aphis nudicauda ^{c g}
- Aphis obiensis ^{c g}
- Aphis ochropus Koch, C.L., 1854^{c g}
- Aphis odinae (van der Goot, 1917)^{c g}
- Aphis odorikonis Matsumura, 1917^{c g}
- Aphis oenotherae Oestlund, 1887^{i c g}
- Aphis oestlundi Gillette, 1927^{i c g b}
- Aphis ogilviei ^{c g}
- Aphis onagraphaga Pashtshenko, 1993^{c g}
- Aphis ononidis (Schouteden, 1903)^{c g}
- Aphis orchidis ^{c g}
- Aphis oregonensis Wilson, H.F., 1915^{c g}
- Aphis origani Passerini, 1860^{c g}
- Aphis ornata (Gillette & M.A. Palmer, 1929)^{c g}
- Aphis orocantabrica García Prieto & Nieto Nafría, 2005^{c g}
- Aphis oxytropiradicis Pashtshenko, 1993^{c g}
- Aphis oxytropis Pashtshenko, 1993^{c g}
- Aphis paludicola Hille Ris Lambers, 1959^{c g}
- Aphis panzeriae ^{c g}
- Aphis papaveris Fabricius, 1777^{c g}
- Aphis papillosa Mier Durante, Nieto Nafría & Ortego, 2003^{c g}
- Aphis paralios Hille Ris Lambers ex Ilharco, 1974^{g}
- Aphis paravanoi Nieto Nafría, Ortego & Mier Durante, 1999^{c g}
- Aphis paraverbasci ^{c g}
- Aphis parietariae ^{c g}
- Aphis pashtshenkoae Remaudière, G., 1997^{c g}
- Aphis passeriniana (Del Guercio, 1900)^{c g}
- Aphis patagonica Blanchard, Everard Eel, 1944^{c g}
- Aphis patriniae ^{c g}
- Aphis patrinicola Holman, 1987^{c g}
- Aphis patriniphila ^{c g}
- Aphis patvaliphaga Pashtshenko, 1994^{c g}
- Aphis pavlovskii ^{c g}
- Aphis pawneepae Hottes, 1934^{c g}
- Aphis pediculariphaga Pashtshenko, 1994^{c g}
- Aphis pentstemonicola Gillette & M.A. Palmer, 1929^{c g}
- Aphis periplocophila Zhang, Guangxue, 1983^{c g}
- Aphis pernilleae ^{c g}
- Aphis peucedani ^{c g}
- Aphis peucedanicarvifoliae ^{c g}
- Aphis phaceliae Gillette & M.A. Palmer, 1929^{c g}
- Aphis philadelphicola Pashtshenko, 1991^{c g}
- Aphis phlojodicarpi Pashtshenko, 1993^{c g}
- Aphis picridicola ^{c g}
- Aphis picridis (Börner, 1950)^{c g}
- Aphis pilosellae (Börner, 1952)^{c g}
- Aphis pilosicauda Gillette & M.A. Palmer, 1932^{c g}
- Aphis piperis Kittel, 1827^{g}
- Aphis plantaginis Goeze, 1778^{c g}
- Aphis platylobii Carver & White, 1970^{c g}
- Aphis pleurospermi Pashtshenko, 1993^{c g}
- Aphis poacyni Zhang, Guangxue, Xiaolin Chen, Tiesen Zhong & Jing^{c g}
- Aphis podagrariae Schrank, 1801^{c g}
- Aphis polaris Stekolshchikov & Khruleva, 2014^{c g}
- Aphis polemoniradicis Pashtshenko, 1993^{c g}
- Aphis polii Barjadze, Blackman & Özdemir, 2015^{c g}
- Aphis pollinaria (Börner, 1952)^{c g}
- Aphis polygonacea Matsumura, 1917^{c g}
- Aphis polygonata ^{c g}
- Aphis pomi De Geer, 1773^{c g b} (apple aphid)
- Aphis ponomarenkoi Holman, 1987^{c g}
- Aphis popovi Mordvilko, 1931^{c g}
- Aphis potentillae Nevsky, 1929^{c g}
- Aphis praeterita Walker, F., 1849^{c g}
- Aphis proffti (Börner, 1942)^{c g}
- Aphis propinqua ^{c g}
- Aphis psammophila Szelegiewicz, 1967^{c g}
- Aphis pseudeuphorbiae Hille Ris Lambers, 1948^{c g}
- Aphis pseudocomosa Stroyan, 1972^{c g}
- Aphis pseudocytisorum Hille Ris Lambers, 1967^{c g}
- Aphis pseudolysimachiae Heikenheimo, 1978^{c g}
- Aphis pseudopaludicola ^{c g}
- Aphis pseudopulchella Blanchard, Everard Eel, 1944^{c g}
- Aphis pseudovalerianae Gillette & M.A. Palmer, 1932^{c g}
- Aphis pulchella Hottes & Frison, 1931^{c g}
- Aphis pulegi Del Guercio, 1911^{c g}
- Aphis pulsatillaephaga Pashtshenko, 1994^{c g}
- Aphis pulsatillicola ^{c g}
- Aphis punicae Passerini, 1863^{c g}
- Aphis pyri Kittel, 1827^{g}
- Aphis pyriphaga ^{c g}
- Aphis raji (Kumar & Burkhardt, 1970)^{c g}
- Aphis ramona Swain, 1918^{c g}
- Aphis rectolactens ^{c g}
- Aphis remaudieri ^{c g}
- Aphis renjifoanae Ortego & Nieto Nafría, 2016^{c g}
- Aphis reticulata Wilson, H.F., 1915^{c g}
- Aphis rhamnellae Shinji, 1922^{c g}
- Aphis rhamnicola Lee, Yerim, Seungwhan Lee & Hyojoong Kim, 2015^{c g}
- Aphis rhamnifila ^{c g}
- Aphis rheicola ^{c g}
- Aphis rhoicola Hille Ris Lambers, 1954^{c g}
- Aphis ripariae Oestlund, 1886^{c g}
- Aphis roberti Nieto Nafría, Ortego & Mier Durante, 1999^{c g}
- Aphis roepkei (Hille Ris Lambers, 1931)^{c g}
- Aphis roripae (Palmer, M.A., 1938)^{c g}
- Aphis roumanica ^{c g}
- Aphis rubiae ^{c g}
- Aphis rubicola Oestlund, 1887^{c g}
- Aphis rubicolens ^{c g}
- Aphis rubifolii (Thomas, C., 1879)^{c g b}
- Aphis rubiradicis Robinson, 1969^{c g}
- Aphis ruborum ^{c g}
- Aphis rukavishnikovi (Ivanovskaya, 1981)^{c g}
- Aphis rumicis Linnaeus, 1758^{c g b} (black aphid)
- Aphis rutae ^{c g}
- Aphis salicariae Koch, C.L., 1855^{c g}
- Aphis salsolae (Börner, 1940)^{c g}
- Aphis salviae Walker, F., 1852^{c g}
- Aphis sambuci Linnaeus, 1758^{c g b} (elder aphid)
- Aphis sanguisorbae Schrank, 1801^{c g}
- Aphis sanguisorbicola ^{c g}
- Aphis saniculae Williams, T.A., 1911^{c g}
- Aphis sarothamni Franssen, 1928^{g}
- Aphis sassceri Wilson, H.F., 1911^{c g}
- Aphis sativae Williams, T.A., 1911^{c g}
- Aphis saussurearadicis Pashtshenko, 1992^{c g}
- Aphis schilderi (Börner, 1940)^{c g}
- Aphis schinifoliae Blanchard, Everard Eel, 1939^{c g}
- Aphis schinivora Ortego, Nieto Nafría & Mier Durante, 2007^{c g}
- Aphis schneideri (Börner, 1940)^{c g}
- Aphis schuhi Robinson, 1984^{c g}
- Aphis scirpi Kittel, 1827^{g}
- Aphis sedi Kaltenbach, 1843^{c g}
- Aphis sediradicis Pashtshenko, 1993^{c g}
- Aphis selini (Börner, 1940)^{c g}
- Aphis sempervivae ^{c g}
- Aphis seneciocrepiphaga Pashtshenko, 1992^{c g}
- Aphis senecionicoides Blanchard, Everard Eel, 1944^{c g}
- Aphis senecionis Williams, T.A., 1911^{c g}
- Aphis senecioradicis (Gillette & M.A. Palmer, 1929)^{c g}
- Aphis sensoriataeuphorbii ^{c g}
- Aphis septentrionalis Pashtshenko, 1994^{c g}
- Aphis serissae Shinji, 1922^{c g}
- Aphis serpylli Koch, C.L., 1854^{c g}
- Aphis serratularadicis Pashtshenko, 1992^{c g}
- Aphis seselii ^{c g}
- Aphis shaposhnikovi Holman, 1987^{c g}
- Aphis sierra Essig, 1947^{c g}
- Aphis silaumi ^{c g}
- Aphis silenephaga Pashtshenko, 1993^{c g}
- Aphis silenicola ^{c g}
- Aphis smilacisina Zhang, Guangxue, 1983^{c g}
- Aphis smirnovi ^{c g}
- Aphis soan ^{c g}
- Aphis sogdiana Nevsky, 1929^{c g}
- Aphis solanella Theobald, F.V., 1914^{c g}
- Aphis solani Kittel, 1827^{g}
- Aphis solidaginis (Börner, 1950)^{c g}
- Aphis solidagophila Pashtshenko, 1992^{c g}
- Aphis solitaria (Baker, J.M., 1934)^{c g}
- Aphis spiraecola Patch, 1914^{c g b} (spirea aphid)
- Aphis spiraephaga ^{c g}
- Aphis spiraephila Patch, 1914^{c g}
- Aphis stachydis ^{c g}
- Aphis stranvaesiae Takahashi, R., 1937^{c g}
- Aphis subnitida (Börner, 1940)^{c g}
- Aphis subviridis (Börner, 1940)^{c g}
- Aphis succisae ^{c g}
- Aphis sugadairensis ^{c g}
- Aphis sumire ^{c g}
- Aphis swezeyi Fullaway, 1910^{c g}
- Aphis symphyti Schrank, 1801^{c g}
- Aphis sywangi Zhang, Guangxue, Xiaolin Chen, Tiesen Zhong & Jing^{c g}
- Aphis tacita Huculak, 1968^{c g}
- Aphis takagii ^{c g}
- Aphis talgarica Kadyrbekov, 2001^{c g}
- Aphis taraxacicola (Börner, 1940)^{c g}
- Aphis tashevi Szelegiewicz, 1962^{c g}
- Aphis taukogi ^{c g}
- Aphis tehuelchis Nieto Nafría & López Ciruelos, 2016^{c g}
- Aphis tetradymia Knowlton, 1941^{c g}
- Aphis teucrii (Börner, 1942)^{c g}
- Aphis thalictri Koch, 1854^{c g b}
- Aphis thaspii Oestlund, 1887^{c g}
- Aphis thecomae ^{c g}
- Aphis thermophila (Börner, 1950)^{c g}
- Aphis thesii ^{c g}
- Aphis thomasi (Börner, 1950)^{c g}
- Aphis tianschanica Kadyrbekov, 2001^{c g}
- Aphis tirucallis Hille Ris Lambers, 1954^{c g}
- Aphis tomenthosi ^{c g}
- Aphis toriliae ^{c g}
- Aphis tormentillae Passerini, 1879^{c g}
- Aphis torquens Holman, 1959^{c g}
- Aphis triglochini Theobald, 1926^{g}
- Aphis triglochinidis Theobald, 1926^{g}
- Aphis triglochinis ^{c g}
- Aphis tripolii ^{c g}
- Aphis tsujii Shinji, 1922^{c g}
- Aphis typhae ^{c g}
- Aphis ucrainensis ^{c g}
- Aphis ulicis Walker, F., 1870^{c g}
- Aphis ulmariae Schrank, 1801^{c g}
- Aphis umbelliferarum (Shaposhnikov, 1950)^{c g}
- Aphis umbrella (Börner, 1950)^{c g}
- Aphis unaweepiensis Hottes, 1948^{c g}
- Aphis urticata Gmelin, 1790^{c g b}
- Aphis utahensis (Knowlton, 1947)^{c g}
- Aphis utilis Zhang, Guangxue, 1983^{c g}
- Aphis utsugicola Monzen, 1929^{c g}
- Aphis uvaeursi Ossiannilsson, 1959^{c g}
- Aphis vaccinii (Börner, 1940)^{c g}
- Aphis valerianae Cowen, J.H., 1895^{c g}
- Aphis vallei Hille Ris Lambers & Stroyan, 1959^{c g}
- Aphis varians Patch, 1914^{c g b}
- Aphis verae ^{c g}
- Aphis veratri Walker, F., 1852^{c g}
- Aphis verbasci Schrank, 1801^{c g}
- Aphis vernoniae Thomas, C., 1878^{c g}
- Aphis veronicicola Holman, 1987^{c g}
- Aphis veroniciphaga Kim, Hyojoong & Wonhoon Lee, 2006^{c g}
- Aphis verticillatae (Börner, 1940)^{c g}
- Aphis viburni Scopoli, 1763^{c g}
- Aphis viburniphila Patch, 1917^{c g}
- Aphis victoriae (Martin, J.H., 1991)^{c g}
- Aphis vineti ^{c g}
- Aphis violae Schouteden, 1900^{c g}
- Aphis violaeradicis Pashtshenko, 1994^{c g}
- Aphis virburniphila ^{c g}
- Aphis viridescens (Del Guercio, 1930)^{c g}
- Aphis viridissima ^{c g}
- Aphis vitalbae Ferrari, 1872^{c g}
- Aphis vitexicola Kim, Hyojoong & Wonhoon Lee, 2006^{c g}
- Aphis viticis Ferrari, 1872^{c g}
- Aphis vitis Scopoli, 1763^{c g}
- Aphis vladimirovae ^{c g}
- Aphis vurilocensis Nieto Nafría, P.A. Brown & López Ciruelos, 2017^{c g}
- Aphis wahena Hottes & Wehrle, 1951^{c g}
- Aphis wartenbergi (Börner, 1952)^{c g}
- Aphis wellensteini (Börner, 1950)^{c g}
- Aphis whiteshellensis Rojanavongse & Robinson, 1977^{c g}
- Aphis xylostei (Börner, 1950)^{c}
- Aphis yangbajaingana Zhang, Guangxue, 1981^{c g}
- Aphis yomogii Shinji, 1922^{c g}
- Aphis zamorana García Prieto & Nieto Nafría, 2005^{c g}
- Aphis zapalina Mier Durante & Ortego, 2016^{c g}
- Aphis zhangi (Zhang, Likun, 2000)^{c g}
- Aphis zonassa Knowlton, 1935^{c g}
- Aphis zweigelti (Börner, 1940)^{c g}

Data sources: i = ITIS, c = Catalogue of Life, g = GBIF, b = Bugguide.net
