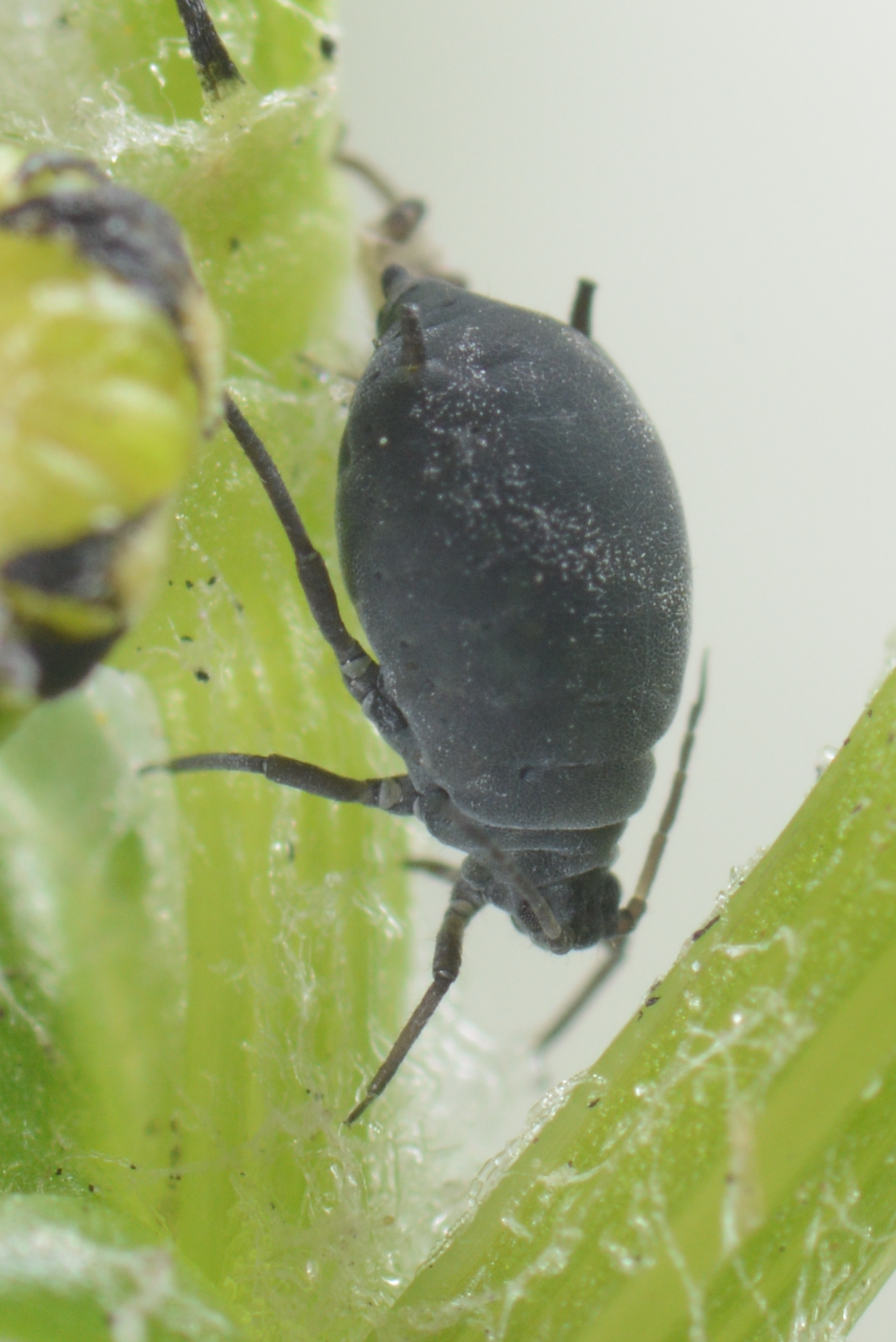
- Aptera of Aphis lugentis

Scientific classification
- Kingdom: Animalia
- Phylum: Arthropoda
- Clade: Pancrustacea
- Class: Insecta
- Order: Hemiptera
- Suborder: Sternorrhyncha
- Family: Aphididae
- Genus: Aphis
- Species: A. lugentis

Binomial name
- Aphis lugentis Williams, 1911

Synonyms
- Aphis nyctalis Palmer, 1952

= Aphis lugentis =

Species of insect

Aphis lugentis, sometimes referred to colloquially as the American ragwort aphid, is a true bug in the aphid family, which feeds on members of the Asteraceae family, particularly within the tribe senecioneae. It can be found naturally throughout most of the United States, except for the Northeast, and has recently been introduced outside of its native range.

== Description ==
Aptera can range in colour from dark yellow-brown, to dark olive or matte black. Aphis Lugentis is a relatively large aphid species, with apteral body length between 1.9 and 2.8 millimeters. This species can be found in dense, aggregated clusters of 50-200 individuals on their host plants, as opposed to less gregarious species such as the sycamore aphid.

Aphis lugentis belongs to the 'fabae' clade within the subgenus Aphis, which contains dark-coloured aphids with very similar morphology. Aphis lugentis can be distinguished from its sister species by its uniformly black appendages (Aphis fabae has light-coloured tibiae), large body length in aptera (Aphis senecionis, has a body length of 1.7-1.9mm), as well as its oligophagous diet (Aphis jacobaeae has a specific host preference for Jacobaea vulgaris syn. Senecio jacobaea).

A. lugentis was nominally described from specimens collected on Senecio lugens. This is not actually the type host for A. lugentis. Instead, Senecio integerrimus var. integerrimus was identified as the plant misidentified by Williams as S. lugens.

== Range ==
=== Natural global range ===
Aphis lugentis naturally occurs throughout the United States, except for the American Northeast where it has been introduced. Within North America, A. lugentis distribution has a southern limit in northern Mexico and a northern limit in Canada.

=== New Zealand range ===
Aphis lugentis occurs predominantly around the port cities of Auckland, Wellington, and Christchurch, with a northern limit of distribution in Northland and a southern limit in Christchurch. It is likely that A. lugentis has been introduced on ornamental Senecio species as well as agricultural produce. Additionally, alate forms of A. lugentis can potentially disperse by wind currents from Australiaor from further abroad.

== Habitat ==
Because of its inability to survive away from its host plants, Aphis lugentis has a habitat preference for areas where Senecio, Erigeron, or Packera species grow prolifically. In the case of Northland sightings of A. lugentis on S. madagascariensis, this is often disturbed habitat such as roadsides and pasture. In Australia, observations of A. lugentis on Senecio odoratus were made in a frequently disturbed area on sandy soil.

== Ecology ==
=== Life cycle/phenology ===
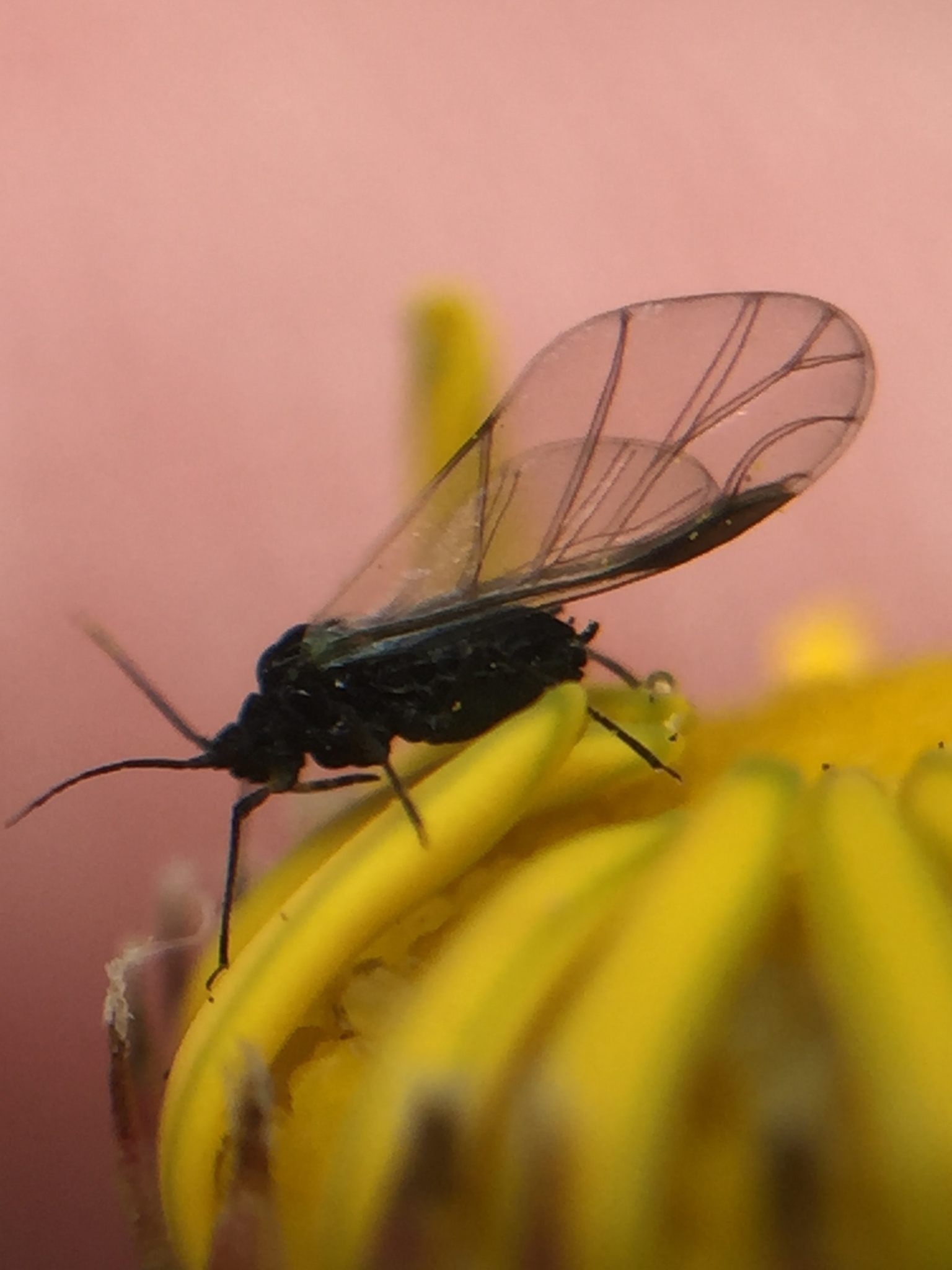
Alata of A. lugentis

Aphis lugentis is monoecious, meaning it depends on a single or a limited range of host plant taxa throughout its life cycle, rather than overwintering on a second host family (as opposed to the heteroecious life cycle of A. fabae). For A. lugentis, this host could be a range of species in the tribe senecioneae. Aphis lugentis is also holocyclic, meaning it produces sexual females (oviparae) and eggs each year. Winged forms (alate virginoparae) of A. lugentis that have landed on a suitable host will give birth to wingless females (apterous virginoparae). These 'aptera' reproduce asexually via a process known as parthenogenesis – essentially, a female aptera will give birth to a clone which will already be pregnant with itself, akin to a matryoshka doll. This is referred to as "telescoping generations" and can lead to the rapid colonization of the initial host plant. During Autumn, when herbaceous growth begins to dwindle, the apterous females begin to birth winged females and males (alatae) that are capable of sexual reproduction (gynoparae). The rendezvous between sexual aphids produces eggs which are capable of overwintering on either a primary or secondary host. Alate males and oviparae of A. lugentis can be found in October in the Northern Hemisphere.

=== Diet and foraging ===
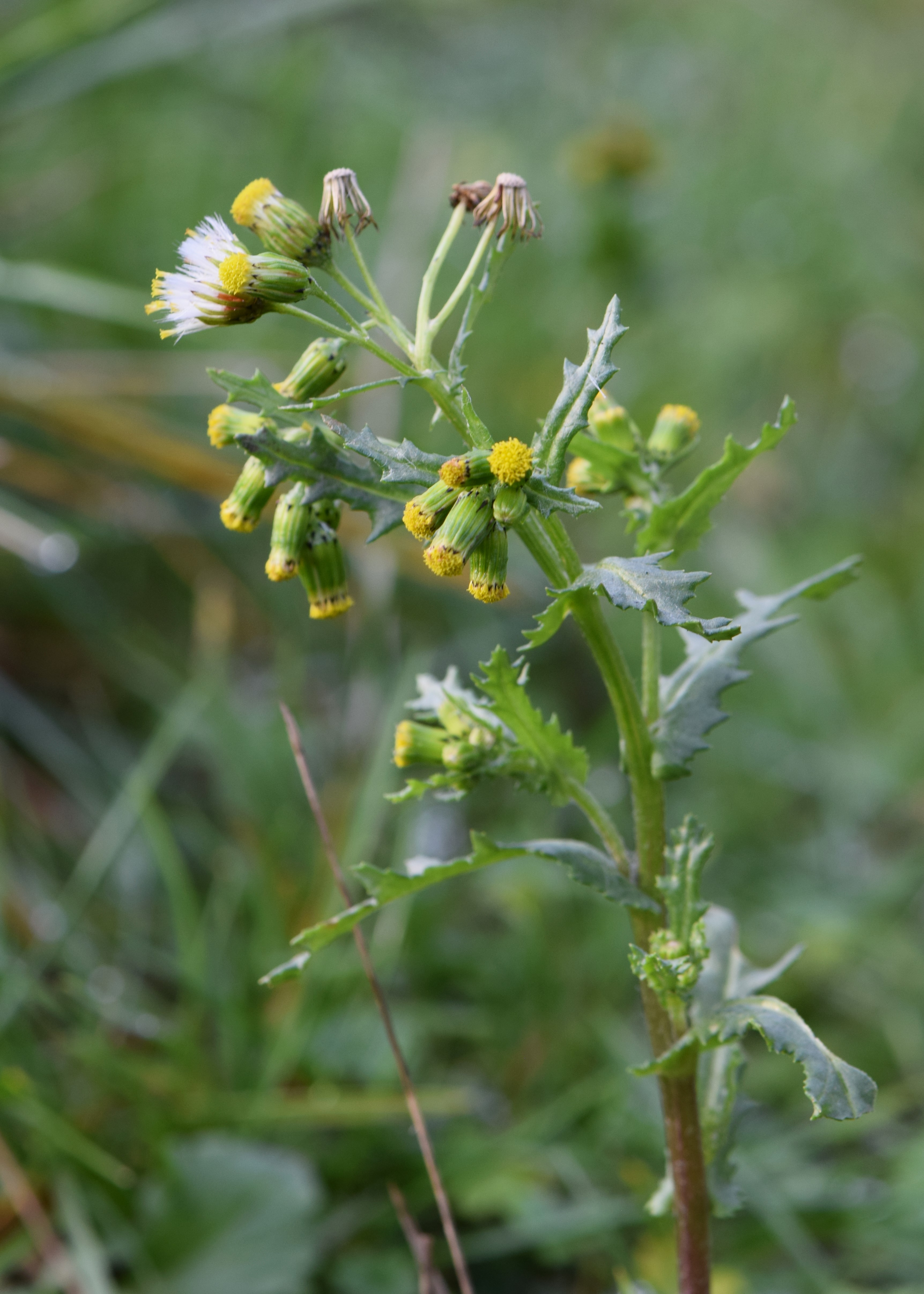
Senecio vulgaris - an example of one of the plants A. lugentis typically feeds on.

A. lugentis use their piercing-sucking mouthparts to feed on sugar-rich phloem from stem, leaves, as well as roots of host plants, namely Senecio, Erigeron, and Packera species. When busy feeding, A. lugentis is usually attended by ants. Vrieling et al. (1991) showed that ants tending to the closely related Aphis jacobaeae would aggressively purge Tyria jacobaeae larvae if detected, therefore freeing up more real estate for A. jacobaeae to feed. The same paper revealed that high pyrrolizidine alkaloid concentration (specifically jacoline and jaconine) in Jacobaea vulgaris deterred A. jacobaeae from feeding. It is likely that pyrrolizidine alkaloids within Senecioneae, such as senecionine and seneciphyllin, may have a similar deterrent effect on A. lugentis, but no experiments have been conducted on this specific species.

=== Predators, parasites, and diseases ===
Aphis lugentis is predated by ladybugs and hoverfly larvae. It is likely that A. lugentis is also predated by lacewings, insectivorous birds such as dunnocks, as well as parasitized by braconid and chalcid wasps. Additionally, species of Entomophthoraceae (specifically, Entomophthora aphidis syn. Zootophthora aphidis) can potentially infect A. lugentis in years with sufficient conditions.

=== Endosymbionts ===
Aphis lugentis belongs to the Aphididae – species in this family associate with the obligate endosymbiont Buchnera aphidicola. B. aphidicola has a role in the synthesis of tryptophan, which aphids cannot produce on their own. Additionally, the facultative endosymbiont Regiella insecticola, has been found in A. lugentis. R. insecticola has a role in blocking plant viruses as well as entomopathogenic fungi, conferring protective benefits to aphids.
