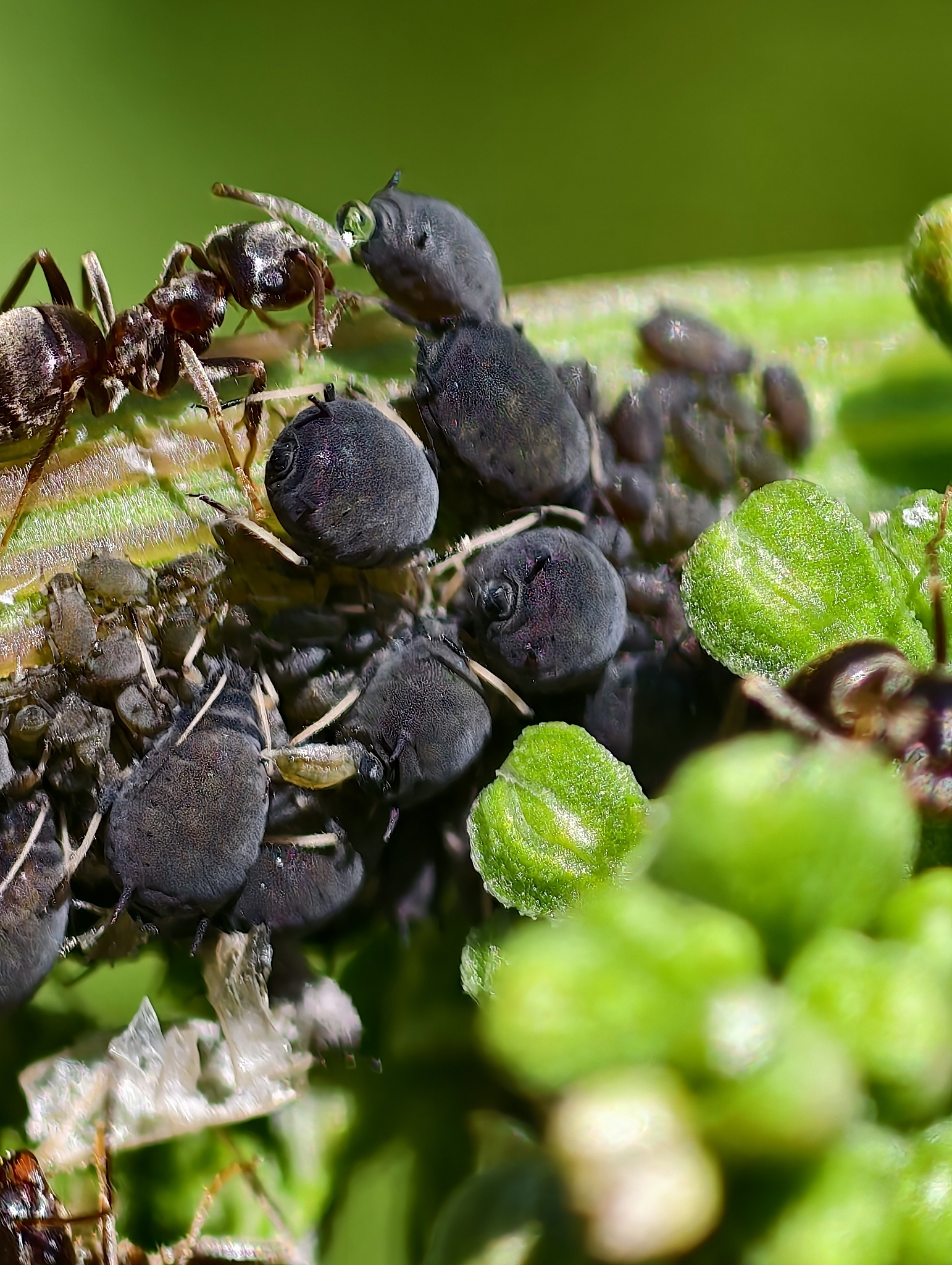

Scientific classification
- Kingdom: Animalia
- Phylum: Arthropoda
- Clade: Pancrustacea
- Class: Insecta
- Order: Hemiptera
- Suborder: Sternorrhyncha
- Family: Aphididae
- Genus: Aphis
- Species: A. rumicis

Binomial name
- Aphis rumicis Linnaeus, 1758

= Aphis rumicis =

Species of fly

Aphis rumicis, otherwise known as the dock aphid or rumex aphid, are aphids belonging to the Aphis genus. They were described by Carl Linnaeus and named after the Rumex plants they were found on.

== Description ==
=== Fundatrix ===
The fundatrix has an oval to elongate body shape, averaging 1.4 by 1.8 mm in size, with a broadly rounded posterior.

The head has sparse dorsal hairs, black eyes, and small accessory eyes on the posterior margin. The antennae are five-segmented, about two-thirds of the length of the body, and bear sensory organs on the fourth and fifth segments, while the rostrum is of typical form.

The thorax bears a pair of prominent lateral tubercles on the prothorax. The legs are predominantly dark, with paler tibiae and basal portions of the femorae, and are covered with numerous short hairs.

The abdomen bears two prominent lateral tubercles on each side. The cornicles are dark, tubular, and slightly tapering, measuring about one and one-third times the length of the cauda. The cauda is short and rounded, while the anal and genital plates are darkly pigmented and bear numerous hairs and short spines.

=== Apterous viviparous female ===
Apterous viviparous females' bodies are elongate oval in shape with an average size of 2.5 by 1.6 mm. They are sparsely covered in small hairs throughout their body.

The head has black eyes with prominent accessory eyes. The antennae are six-segmented, with darkened basal and terminal segments, and bear sensory organs on the fifth and sixth segments. The rostrum extends to the middle coxae and bears a pair of accessory setae.

The thorax bears a prominent lateral tubercle on each side of the prothorax. The legs are predominantly dark, with paler tibiae and basal portions of the femorae, and are covered with numerous short hairs.

The abdomen has two lateral tubercles on each side, occasionally by smaller indistinct tubercles. The cornicles are dark, tubular, and slightly tapering, measuring approximately one and one-third to one and one-half times the length of the cauda. The cauda is slightly spoon-shaped distally and bears both stout bristles and long curved hairs, while the anal and genital plates resemble those of the fundatrix.

=== Winged viviparous female ===
Winged viviparous females' bodies are 2.4 by 1.3 mm on average.

The head is darkly pigmented ranging from black to brownish-black with black eyes, and prominent accessory eyes. The antennae are approximately two-thirds the length of the body, with numerous secondary sensoria on the third antennal segment and occasional sensoria on the fourth. The rostrum is of typical form and darkened towards the tip.

The thorax bears two prominent lateral tubercles on the prothorax. The wings are fully developed, and the legs are similar to those of apterous viviparous females but somewhat bigger.

The abdomen varies dark black to olive-green and typically bears irregular dorsal pigmentation. Prominent lateral tubercles are present, and dark tubular cornicles are slightly tapering and approximately one and one-half times the length of the cauda. The cauda is smaller than that of the apterous viviparous females, while the anal and genital plates are similar in structure.

=== Sexuparae ===
Male-producing sexuparae are apterous and closely resemble the apterous viviparous female in appearance. Female-producing sexuparae are winged, and similar to the winged viviparous female, but are generally larger in size.

=== Male ===
Male dock aphids average 1.4 mm in length and .7 mm in width, making them smaller and more slender than winged viviparous females, with the body tapering more strongly toward the posterior end. When viewed dorsally, they appear glossy black, although the abdomen is often very dark green. Small hairs are scattered across the body.

The head is black with large black eyes and prominent accessory eyes. The antennae are about two-thirds to three-quarters the length of the body, black or sometimes paler, and bears multiple sensoria on segments three to five and a compound sensorium on segment six. The rostrum is of normal form.

The thorax is black and shiny, with prominent prothoracic tubercles. The legs are slender and predominantly black, with paler tibiae and femora, and are covered with hairs, especially on the tibiae.

The abdomen varies from almost black to dark green, often with darker patches and black lateral margins, and bears two lateral tubercles on each side. The cornicles are small, dark, and tubular, slightly longer than the cauda in dorsal view. The cauda is smaller than in the winged viviparous female and bears short spines and several long hairs, while the anal plate is black and the genital plate is black with claspers bearing spines and stout hairs; the penis sheath is paler.

=== Oviparous female ===
Oviparous female dock aphids average 1.6 mm in length and .9 mm in width, making them smaller and narrower in comparison to winged viviparous females, and tapers posteriorly. They vary in color from dirty brownish black to dark green, typically, a velvety dark green. Short hairs are distributed over the body.

The head is black to dark green in color, with small black compound eyes and reduced accessory eyes. The antennae are relatively long, reaching approximately two-thirds of the body length, pale grey overall but variably darkened on specific segments; the sixth antennal segment is elongate and approximately equal in length to segments three to five combined. A compound sensorium is present on the terminal antennal segment and a subapical sensorium occurs on the fifth segment, with sparse setae distributed across all segments. The rostrum is of normal aphid form, darkened distally and bearing relatively few setae.

The thorax is darker in color and bears prominent lateral tubercles on the prothorax. The legs are short and robust, greyish with darker coxae, trochanters, and tarsi, and are covered in scattered hairs, especially dense on the tibiae. The hind tibiae are notably swollen and bear numerous irregular pale sensoria-like areas along their length.

The abdomen is dark green, sometimes with lighter patches, and carrys a pair of lateral tubercles. The cornicles are small, black, and tubular, slightly exceeding the cauda in dorsal view. The cauda is small, stout, and darkened apically, white the anal plate is black and the bilobed genital plate is also dark and densely setose.

The ova, when first laid, are somewhat greenish in color but rapidly become black and shiny upon exposure to air. They are approximately .5 mm in length on average.

== Lifecycle ==
The dock aphid exhibits a heteroecious holocyclic life cycle, alternating between Euonymus europaeus as the primary winter host and various herbaceous plants, including broad bean, as secondary summer hosts. The species overwinters in the egg state on Euonymus, where eggs are deposited by oviparous females in autumn. These eggs hatch in spring, between March and April, giving rise to fundatrices, which mature rapidly and initiate a series of parthenogenetic, viviparous generations.

Early generations on Euonymus include both apterous and alate viviparous females, although apterous forms predominate initially. As the season progresses, increasing proportions of winged viviparous females are produced. These winged migrants disperse to summer hosts, where they establish populations of aliencolae and give rise to further parthenogenetic generations. On these secondary hosts, reproduction continues rapidly, typically with multiple overlapping generations consisting mainly of apterous viviparous females, although alate forms are periodically produced and facilitate dispersal between host plants.

This migratory and seasonal alternation in host use appears to be an adaptation to the species' polyphagous habit. Apterous viviparous forms are primarily responsible for rapid colony establishment on newly colonised plants, while the production of winged forms reduces overcrowding and enables dispersal to additional host plants as local conditions deteriorate.

In late summer and autumn, winged sexuparae are produced on the summer hosts and migrate back to Euonymus plants. There they give rise to the sexual generation, including oviparous females and males. At approximately the same period, winged sexuparae may also be produced from apterous forms on the intermediate hosts. These migrate to the winter host and contribute to the formation of the sexual generation. Males are typically produced on the intermediate hosts towards the end of summer, and fertilizations occurs on the winter hosts following migration.

After mating, the oviparous females lay eggs on the winter host, typically near buds or in crevices of the bark of older branches. These eggs overwinter and restart the cycle in the following spring.

== Distribution ==
The dock aphid is widely distributed throughout temperate regions of the Northern Hemisphere. It is recorded across most of Europe, including the British Isles and continental regions from western to eastern Europe, and is also present in parts of Asia. In North America, the species is regarded as introduced and is established in many regions of the United States and Canada.

It was mistakenly believed to be present within Hawaii, however, that was instead Aphis fabae as determined by Louise M. Russell.

== Humans and Aphis rumicis ==
On Swiss chard(Beta vulgaris), Aphis rumicis commonly feeds on the undersides of mature leaves. As colonies grow, individuals spread to younger foliage and stems. The species is regarded as an important pest of Swiss chard in parts of Turkey and the Mediterranean region, where heavy infestations may impair plant growth and result in the accumulation of honeydew on leaves. However, it appears that Swiss chard is a less favorable host compared to Broadleaf Dock due to: increased developmental times for immature stages, high mortality of immature nymphs, decreased rate of reproduction, and a lower intrinsic rate of increase.
