= Aphis oestlundi =

Scientific classification
- Domain: Eukaryota
- Kingdom: Animalia
- Phylum: Arthropoda
- Class: Insecta
- Order: Hemiptera
- Suborder: Sternorrhyncha
- Family: Aphididae
- Subfamily: Aphidinae
- Tribe: Aphidini
- Genus: Aphis
- Species: A. oestlundi

Binomial name
- Aphis oestlundi Gillette, 1927

Species of true bug

Aphis oestlundi is a species of aphid in the family Aphididae.
