= Aphis cytisorum =

Scientific classification
- Kingdom: Animalia
- Phylum: Arthropoda
- Clade: Pancrustacea
- Class: Insecta
- Order: Hemiptera
- Suborder: Sternorrhyncha
- Family: Aphididae
- Genus: Aphis
- Species: A. cytisorum

Binomial name
- Aphis cytisorum Hartig, 1841

Species of aphid

Aphis cytisorum, the laburnum aphid or broom aphid, is a species of aphid in the family Aphididae. It has two currently recognized subspecies: A. cytisorum ssp. cytisorum, which feeds on Laburnum, and A. cytisorum ssp. sarothamni, which feeds on Broom. Adults are usually a very dark green color, but may appear dark grey due to the white waxy secretions.
