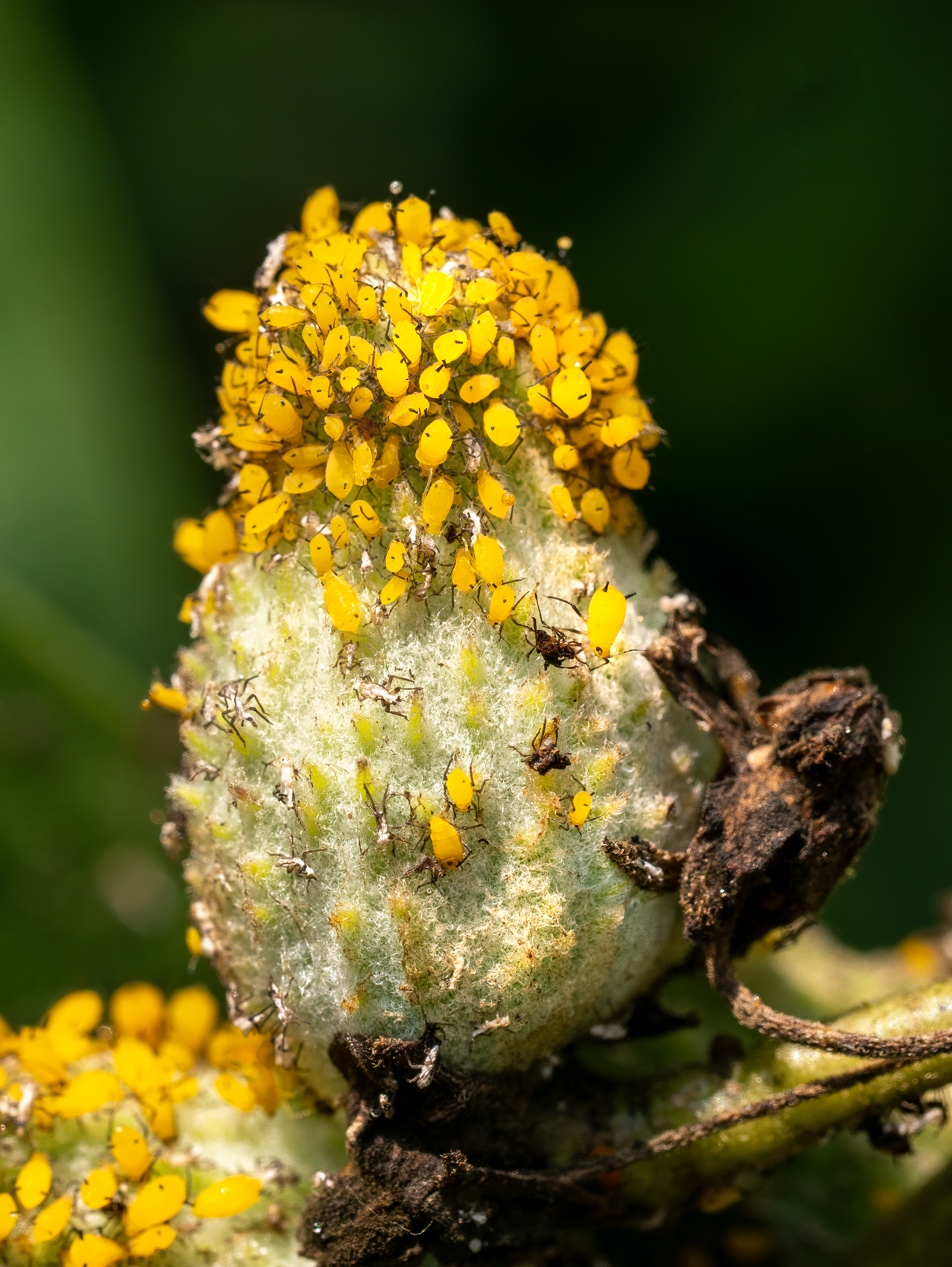
- A colony of Aphis nerii on milkweed with discarded exoskeletons
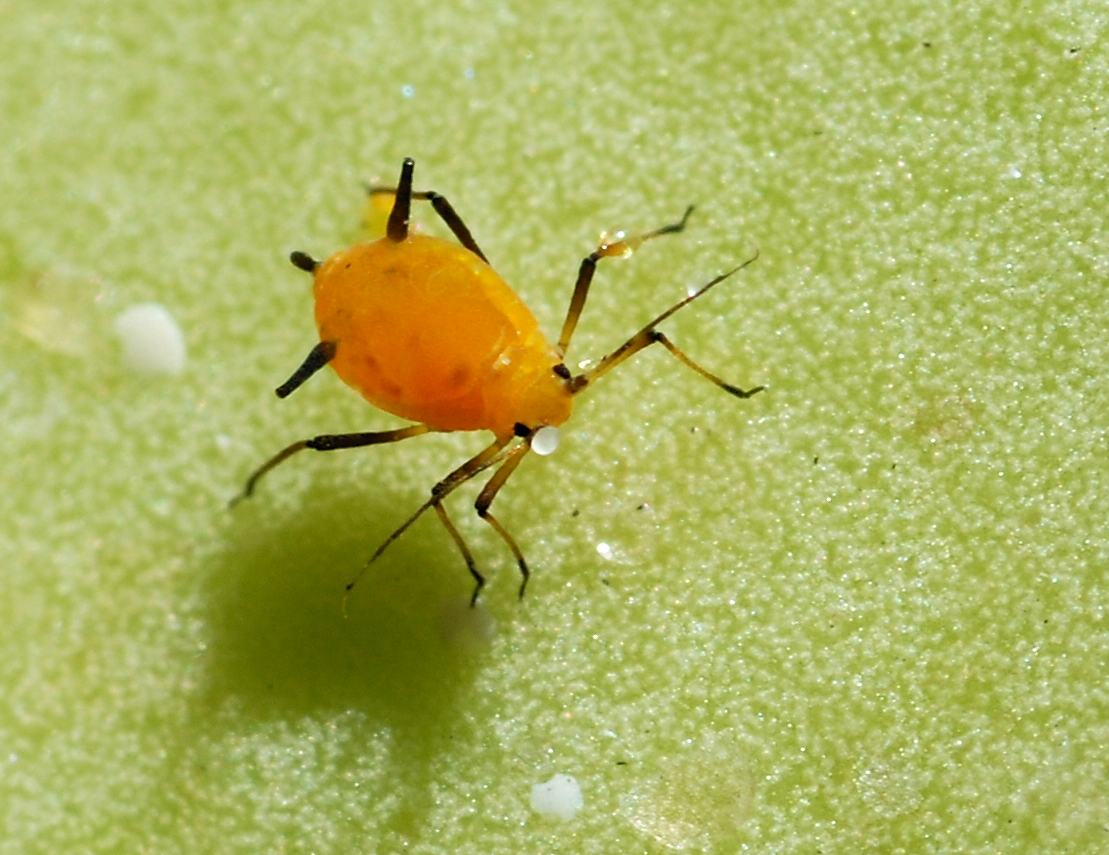
- An individual Aphis nerii

Scientific classification
- Kingdom: Animalia
- Phylum: Arthropoda
- Clade: Pancrustacea
- Class: Insecta
- Order: Hemiptera
- Suborder: Sternorrhyncha
- Family: Aphididae
- Genus: Aphis
- Species: A. nerii

Binomial name
- Aphis nerii Fonscolombe, 1841

Synonyms
- Aphis lutescens Monell, 1879

= Aphis nerii =

Species of true bug

Aphis nerii is an aphid of the family Aphididae. Its common names include oleander aphid, milkweed aphid, sweet pepper aphid, and nerium aphid.

== Distribution ==
The oleander aphid is widespread in regions with tropical and Mediterranean climates. In Poland, oleander aphid has only been reported from a glasshouse. Small populations of oleander aphid are present in gardens in London, England.

== Lifecycle ==
Milkweed aphids giving live birth on narrow leaf milkweed. Sped up twenty times.

Female aphids lay live young (nymphs), a process known as viviparity. Female aphids reproduce by parthenogenesis. Males have never been observed in the wild but have been produced under laboratory conditions. Females may be wingless or winged (alate), the production of the alate form occurs at a higher rate in regions where the aphid must migrate to temporary hosts each year.

Oleander aphid has a wide range of hosts, but mainly feeds on plants in the dogbane family, including milkweeds, oleander and periwinkle. It is occasionally recorded feeding on plants in the bindweed family, daisy family and spurge family as well as rarely being recorded on Citrus.

== Virus vector ==
Oleander aphid can act as a vector of viruses in the genus Potyvirus and Cucumovirus. The following viruses are known to be vectored by oleander aphid:

- Araujia mosaic virus
- Bean yellow mosaic virus
- Bittergourd mosaic virus
- Citrus tristeza virus
- Cucumber mosaic virus
- Lentil mosaic virus
- Papaya ringspot virus
- Tobacco etch virus
- Watermelon mosaic virus
- Zucchini yellow mosaic virus

== Gallery ==
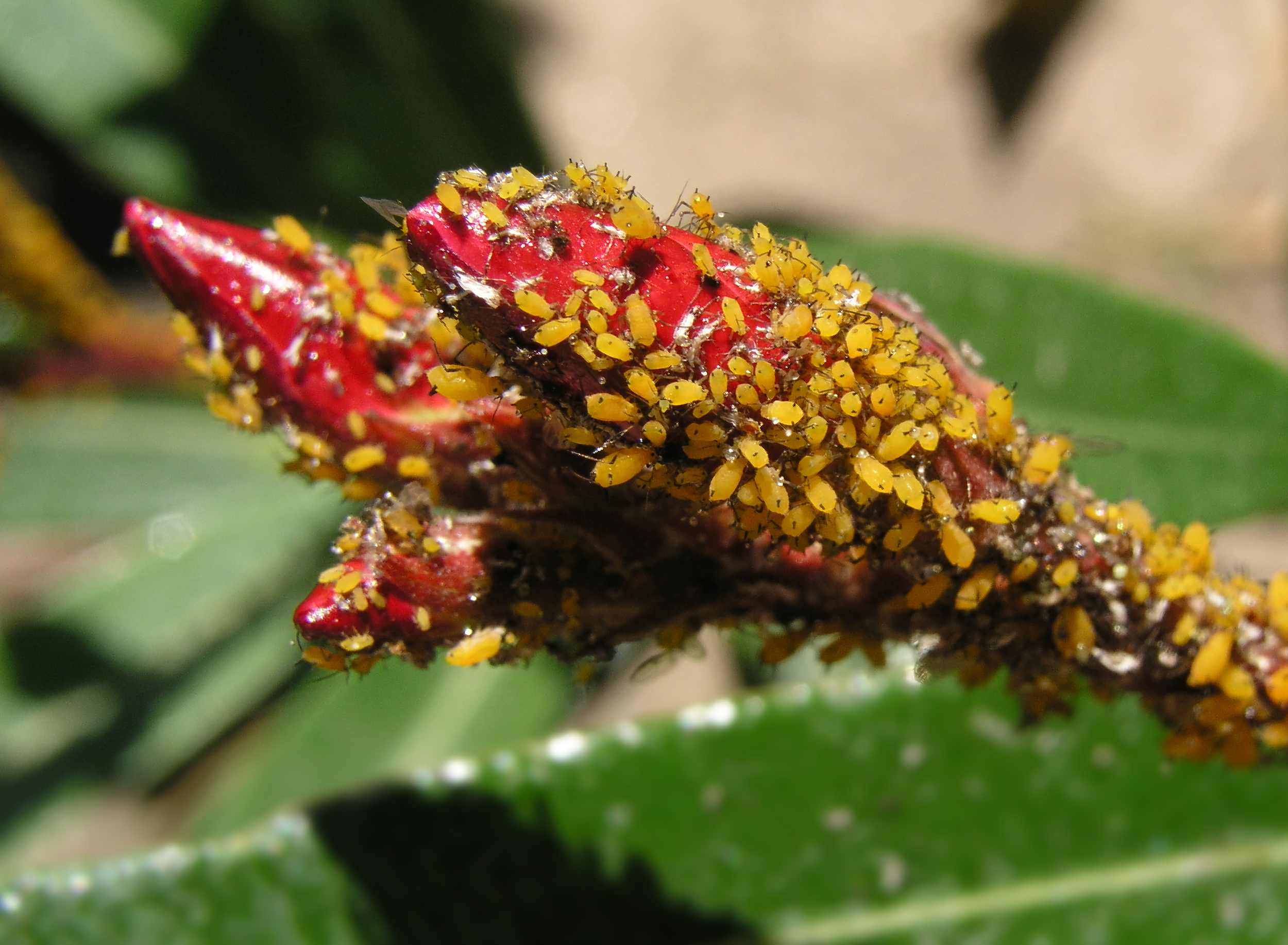
Colony on Nerium oleander

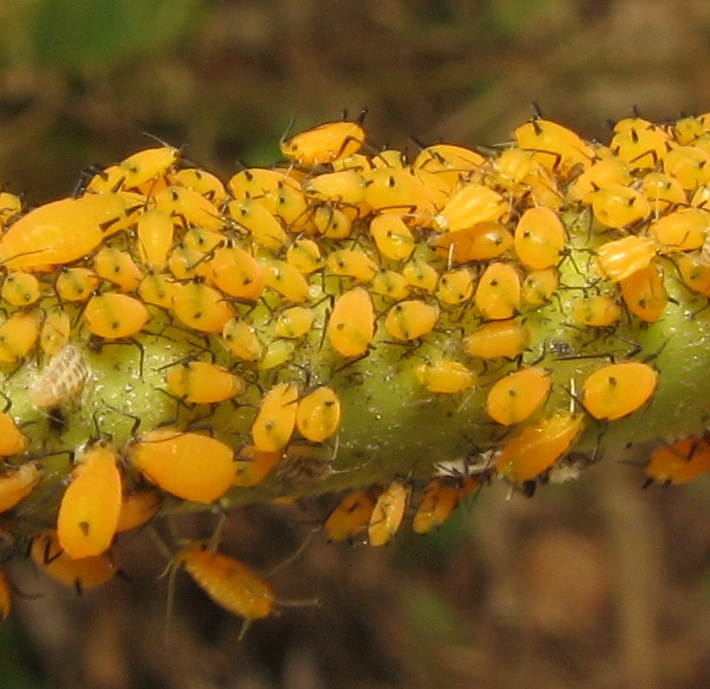
Colony on Asclepias syriaca (common milkweed)

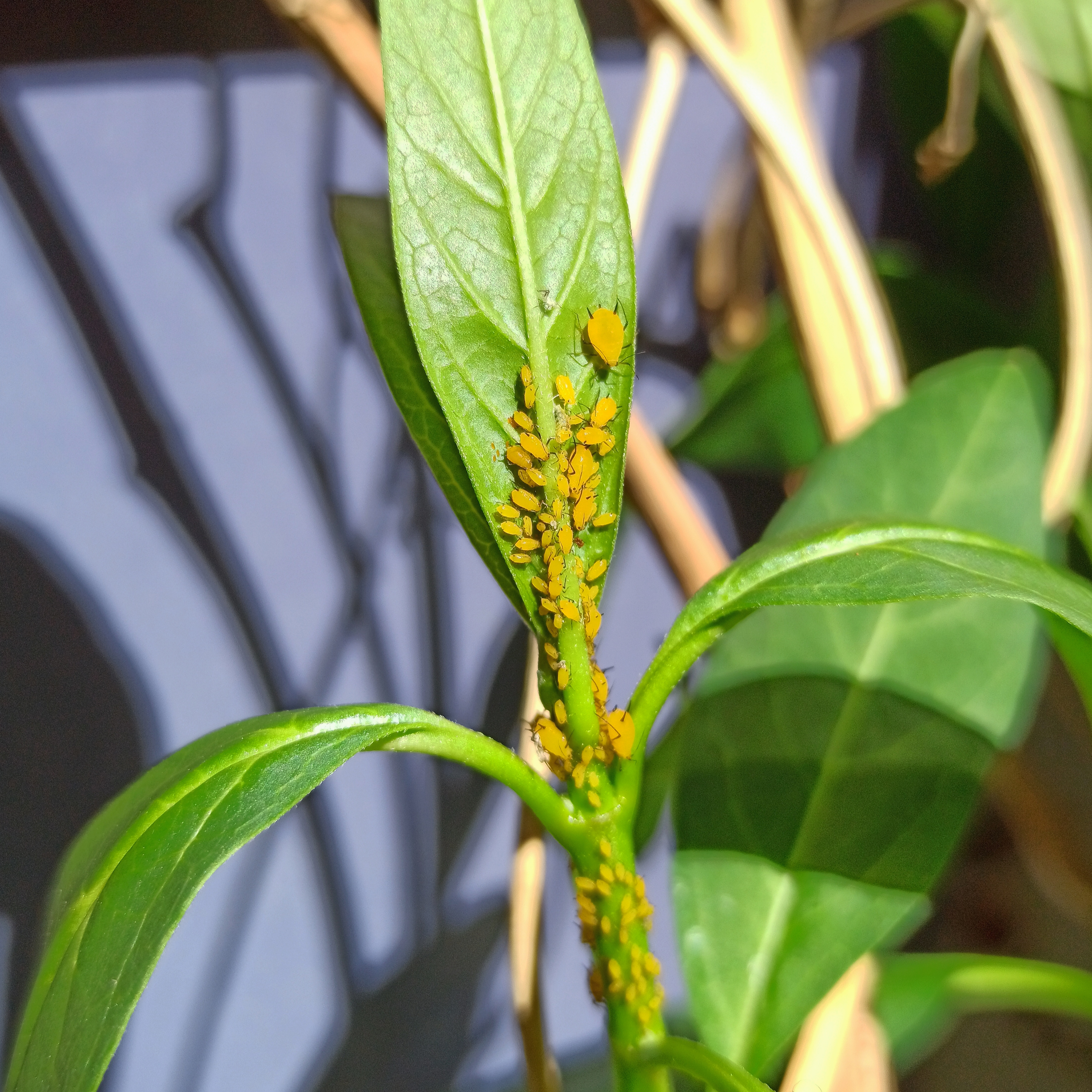
Colony on Asclepias curassavica

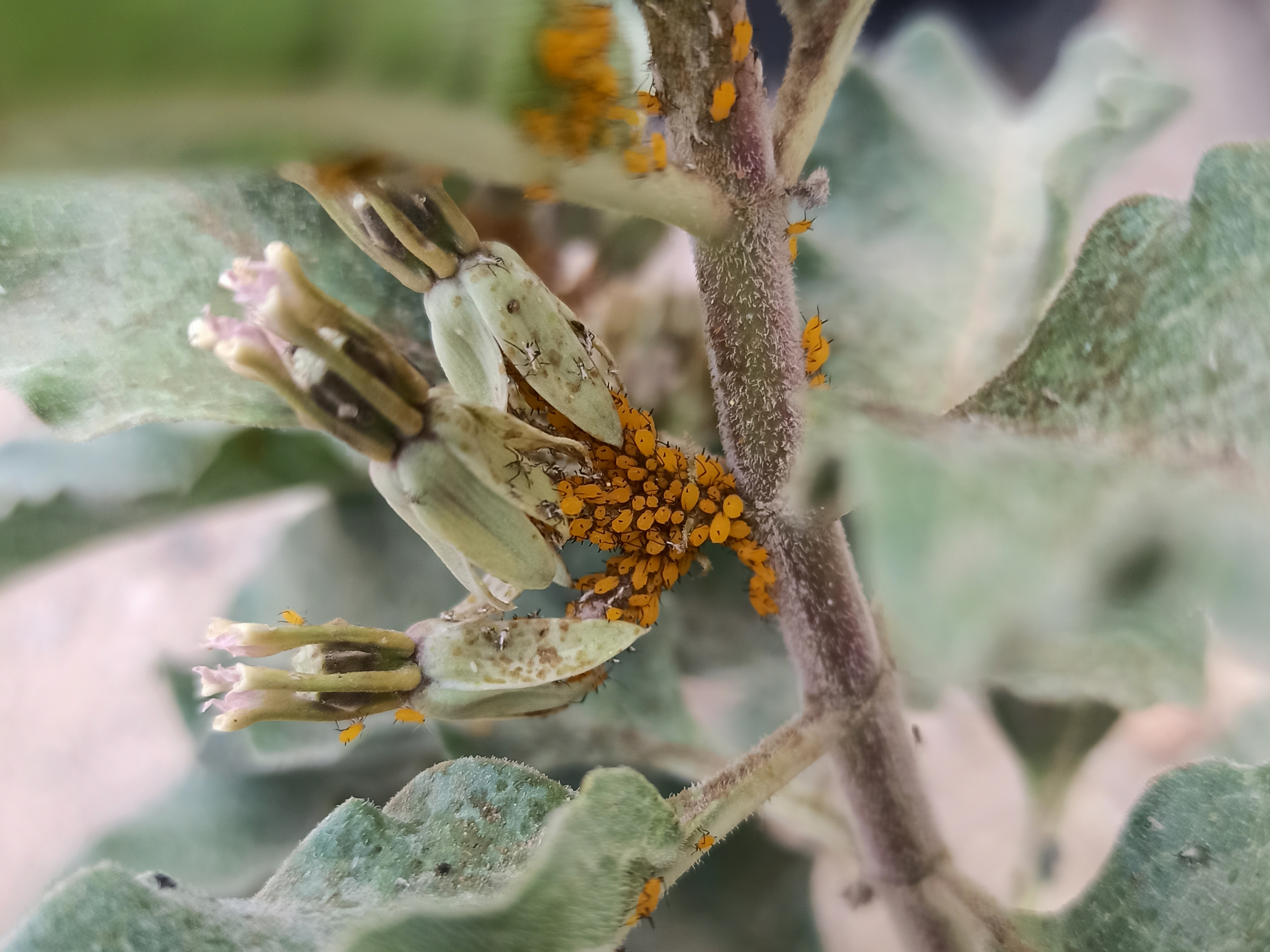
Colony on Asclepias oenotheroides

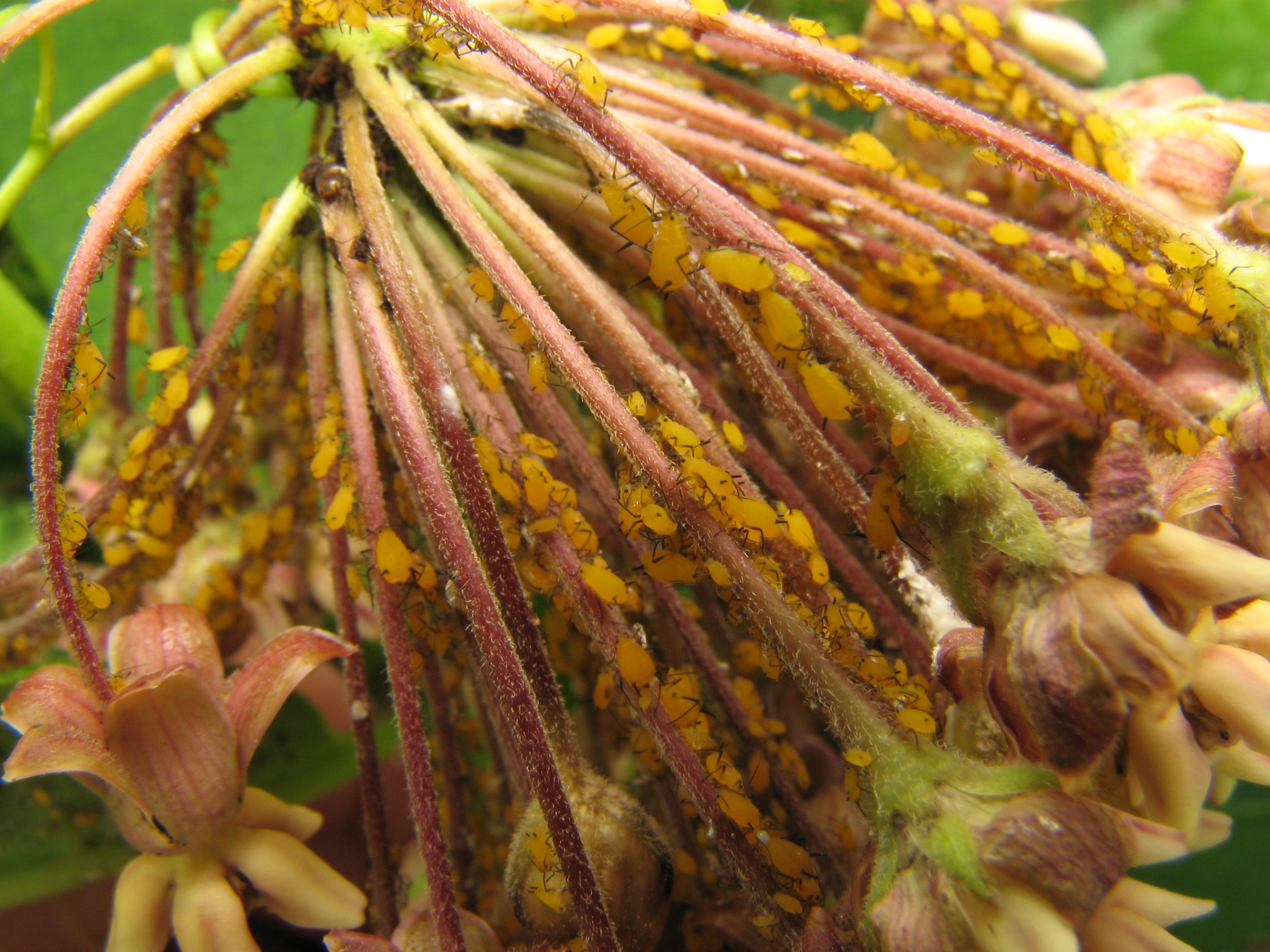
Colony on Asclepias syriaca inflorescence

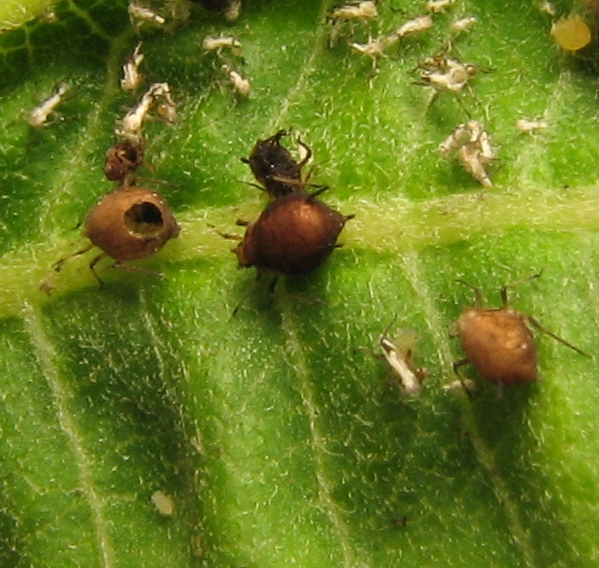
Mummified aphids, parasitized by Aphidiinae wasp, probably Lysiphlebus

A European paper wasp preying on Milkweed aphids which are on narrow leaf milkweed. Most scenes are repeated at one-fourth speed

Milkweed aphids on narrow-leaf milkweed eliminating honeydew. Unlike some aphids, these kick the drop away with their leg

A milkweed aphid moulting on narrow-leaf milkweed. Shown at ten times speed

A milkweed aphid on narrow-leaf milkweed is attacked by a hoverfly larvae. It thrashs and release pheromones and sticky wax from its cornicles. Nearby aphids flee. Video played at 4X speed

A milkweed aphid pushes the sticky wax drop from its cornicle against an attacking parasitic wasp, extruding another drop. Two scenes at one-tenth speed. A different aphid has captured a wasp

Winged adult (alate) aphids. Some scenes repeated at one-twentieth speed. Recorded at 60 fps

Hoverfly larva on narrow-leaf milkweed with milkweed aphids, ladybird eggs, and larva. After first minute, shown at four times speed. Larva recorded in early morning prior to sunrise
