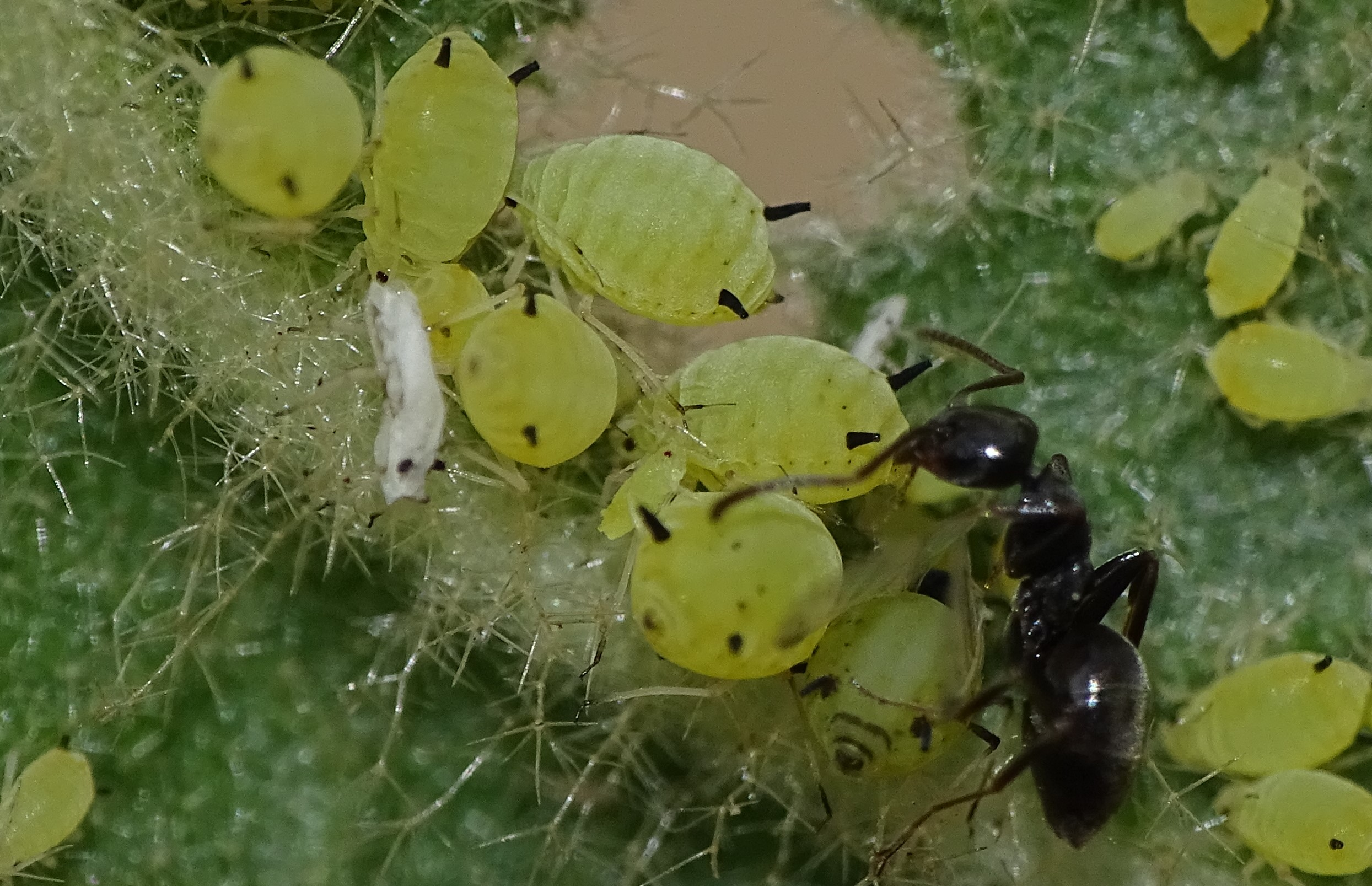

Scientific classification
- Kingdom: Animalia
- Phylum: Arthropoda
- Class: Insecta
- Order: Hemiptera
- Suborder: Sternorrhyncha
- Family: Aphididae
- Genus: Aphis
- Species: A. spiraecola

Binomial name
- Aphis spiraecola Patch, 1914

= Aphis spiraecola =

Aphid pest of Citrus, virus vector

Aphis spiraecola is a species of aphid described in 1914 by Edith Marion Patch. Its common names include green citrus aphid, Spirea aphid, and apple aphid. It is distributed worldwide, and is most abundant in the United States. It has a diploid chromosome number of 2n=8.

== Discovery ==
This species was first discovered by Edith Marion Patch in 1914. Patch discovered that A. pomi would feed and develop on Spiraea and A. spiraecola would feed and develop on Malus which confirmed that aphids were a highly variable species. Patch's colonies on apple were decimated by a fungus so all transfer attempts to secondary hosts, which would have demonstrated the limited host range of A. pomi, were made using A. spiraecola from Spiraea instead. Later she suggested using the names A. pomi and A. spiraecola on the basis of the plants on which they were found thus leading to the names each species is known by today. Another species, A. citricola was described by van der Goot in 1912 while doing a study in Chile. This aphid became a synonym for another citrus aphid - Toxoptera citricida. In 1975, Hille Ris Lambers demonstrated that A. citricola referred to A. spiraecola, thus synonymizing A. citricola with A. spiraecola.

== Anatomy ==
This species of aphid can range from a bright greenish-yellow color to an apple green, hence their common name. They have a dark-brown head and thorax, and a yellowish-green abdomen with dusky lateral patches on each segment with a membranous and pale dorsum. They are often confused with A. pomi (apple aphid) due to overlapping host plants that they aggregate to; however, they are also morphologically different as A. pomi have marginal tubercles on their lower abdomen while A. spiraecola do not.

== Reproduction ==
A. spiraecola is an holocyclic species, meaning that they undergo sexual reproduction during part of its life cycle and reproduces entirely parthenogenetically over most of its geographical range. Where it is holocyclic and produces sexual morphs, the primary hosts are Spiraea or Citrus.

== Diet ==
Aphis spiraecola is found on over 65 plant genera including economically important crops like citrus, Theobroma cacao, papaya anona, Malus spp., Pirus spp., Prunus spp. etc. Except the Lavandula spp. and Paliurus spina-christi, all the host plants are evergreen and A. spiraecola is found on these two host plants mostly during the plants flowering time. This species is polyphagous, meaning it can feed on a variety of different foods allowing it to survive in a plethora of environments. They typically feed on young buds/flowers, shoots and leaves of host plants. If introduced to a new place, the odds of it surviving and reproducing are very good, barring cold climates as mentioned previously. Primary (winter) hosts are Spiraea spp. and Citrus spp. with numerous secondary host plants, in well over 20 families, particularly in the Caprifoliaceae, Compositae, Rosaceae, Rubiaceae and Rutaceae families. This aphid has been found to have a preference for woody plants of a shrubby growth habit with citrus and apples being the most important/affected crop hosts.

== Distribution ==
A. spiraecola is globally distributed among temperate and tropical regions, including Asia, Africa, North America, Europe, and Oceania regions with the exception of cold regions. This species is thought to have originated in the Far East, dating back to at least 1907 in North America, Australia in 1926, New Zealand in 1931, the Mediterranean in 1939 (other sources say only in the early 1990s), Africa in 196, Israel in 1970, Germany in 2000, Hungary in 2004, Bulgaria and Serbia in 2007, the Baltic region in 2015, Kosovo in 2018 (Llugaxhi on 23 July), Slovakia in 2018 (Tvrdošovce on 2 May), the Czech Republic in 2019 (Bílé Podolí on 21 June, the United Kingdom in 2018 (Ash (near Canterbury) England on 13 July, after previous detections elsewhere in the UK in 1979 and 1996 did not go any further), and Denmark in 2019 (in the Pometum of the Taastrup campus of the University of Copenhagen on 20 July). Today, A. spiraecola is found all over the world, whether they are native or introduced to the area, and have been found to be invasive almost everywhere they reside. There are many possibilities and risks of introducing this species to new geographic areas. One of which is the movement of fruits or ornamental plants which can transport this organism to a new geographic area, and since it has the ability to feed on almost any food source, it can easily survive and reproduce in almost any environment, thus introducing them to a new area where they can survive.

== Environmental impact ==
A. spiraecola is a pest of citrus, apples and ornamentals. They also transmit a large portion of plant viruses which can cause entire crop yields to be at risk of being affected. Therefore A. spiraecola poses a significant negative impact on crop production and possibly economic loss, however they don't seem to impact much else in terms of human/animal health, aquaculture, native fauna/flora, tourism, trade, transportation, or the environment/biodiversity.

== Prevention and control ==
Despite being native in certain terrestrial regions, this species can be severely detrimental to crops in a variety of regions, making them invasive virtually everywhere they inhabit. Many predators prey on A. spiraecola colonies but this doesn't result in ample population control. Insecticides are recommended for pest control on citrus crop hosts affected by A. spiraecola. Several studies tested a range of insecticides in citrus groves, which compared treatments in apple orchards. A study also described the effect of different insecticide treatments on cucurbits in South America. Examples of suitable insecticide treatment for A. spiraecola are ethion, parathion-ethyl, dimethoate, fenitrothion, and dimefox via stem bandages. The favored insecticide is imidacloprid for orchard control, as shown in an experiment comparing efficacy of a plant growth regulator on apple/pear trees in Florida.
