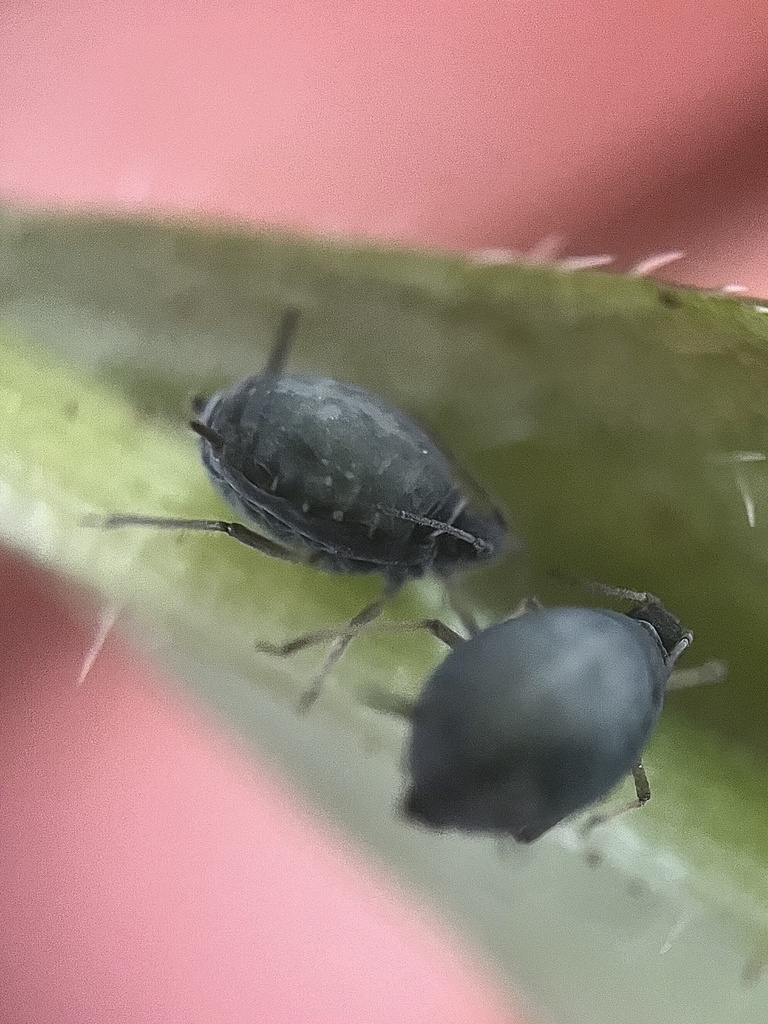

Scientific classification
- Kingdom: Animalia
- Phylum: Arthropoda
- Clade: Pancrustacea
- Class: Insecta
- Order: Hemiptera
- Suborder: Sternorrhyncha
- Family: Aphididae
- Genus: Aphis
- Species: A. sambuci

Binomial name
- Aphis sambuci Linnaeus, 1758

= Aphis sambuci =

Species of aphid

Aphis sambuci, commonly known as the elderberry aphid, is a species of aphid distributed in all the Holarctic regions except for Japan and Korea.

The main host species of this aphid are members of the Sambucus genus. This aphid has been mainly recorded on the Eurasian black elderberry but has also been found on the North American subspecies of red elderberry.

== Appearance ==
This species has a cross pattern on its back, and is blackish to greenish. Its siphunculi are short and black. It sometimes has a white striped belly. There are also sometimes white margins on the top of the aphid.

== History ==
The species was described by Carl Linnaeus in 1758.
