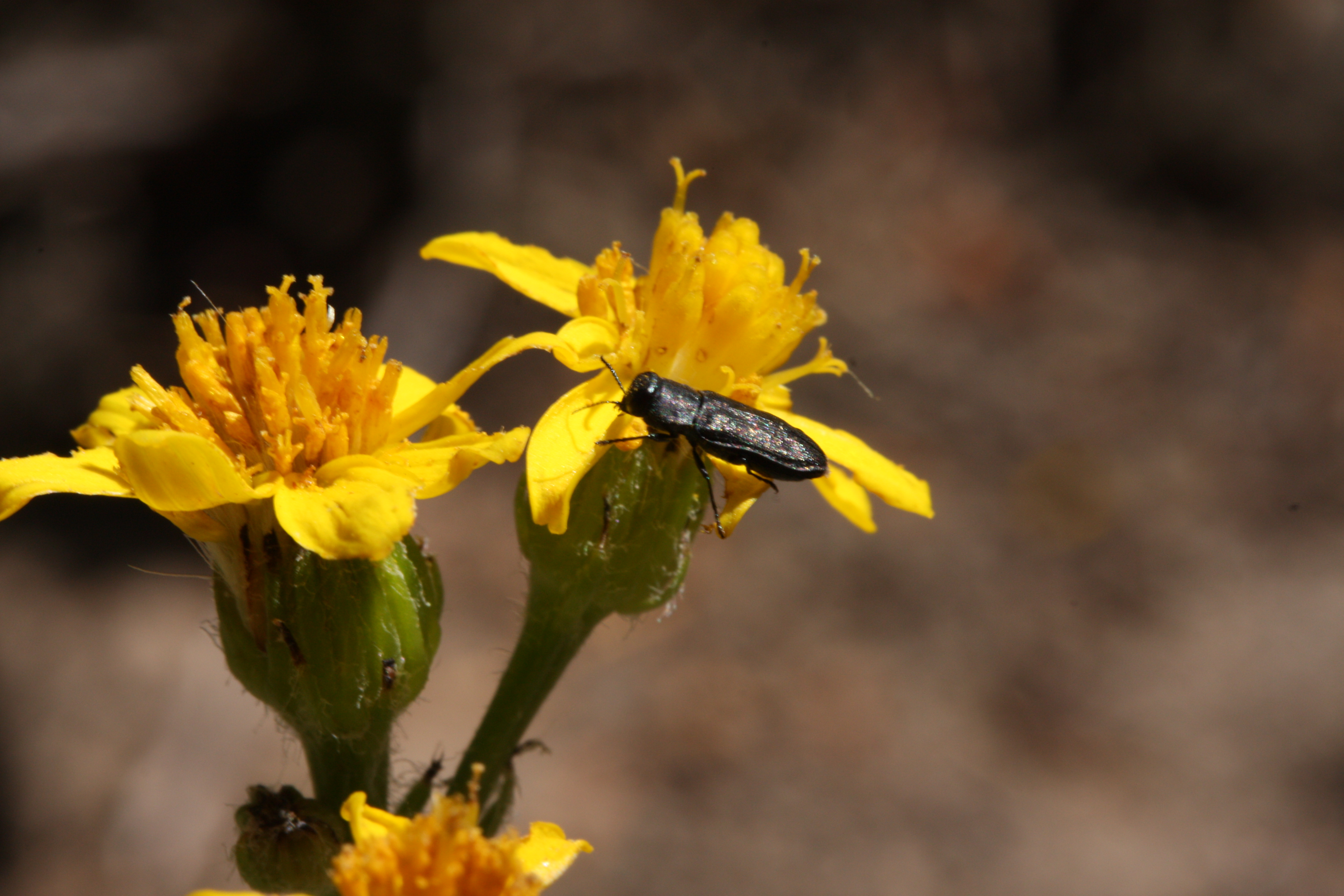
- S. integerrimus with unidentified Coleoptera

Conservation status
- Secure (NatureServe)

Scientific classification
- Kingdom: Plantae
- Clade: Tracheophytes
- Clade: Angiosperms
- Clade: Eudicots
- Clade: Asterids
- Order: Asterales
- Family: Asteraceae
- Genus: Senecio
- Species: S. integerrimus

Binomial name
- Senecio integerrimus Nutt.

= Senecio integerrimus =

Species of flowering plant

Senecio integerrimus is a species of flowering plant in the aster family known by the common names lambstongue ragwort and tall western groundsel. It is native to western and central North America, where it grows in grassland, forest, and other habitat. It is a biennial or perennial herb producing one or a few erect stems 20 to 70 centimeters (8 to 27 1/2 in) tall from a caudex with fleshy shallow roots. The linear to lance-shaped or triangular leaves are primarily basal, with blades up to 25 cm (10 in) long. The herbage is slightly hairy to woolly or cobwebby. The inflorescence bears several flower heads in a cluster, the middle, terminal head often largest and held on a shorter peduncle, making the cluster look flat. The heads contain many disc florets and usually 8 or 13 ray florets which may be yellow to cream to white in color. Some heads lack ray florets.
