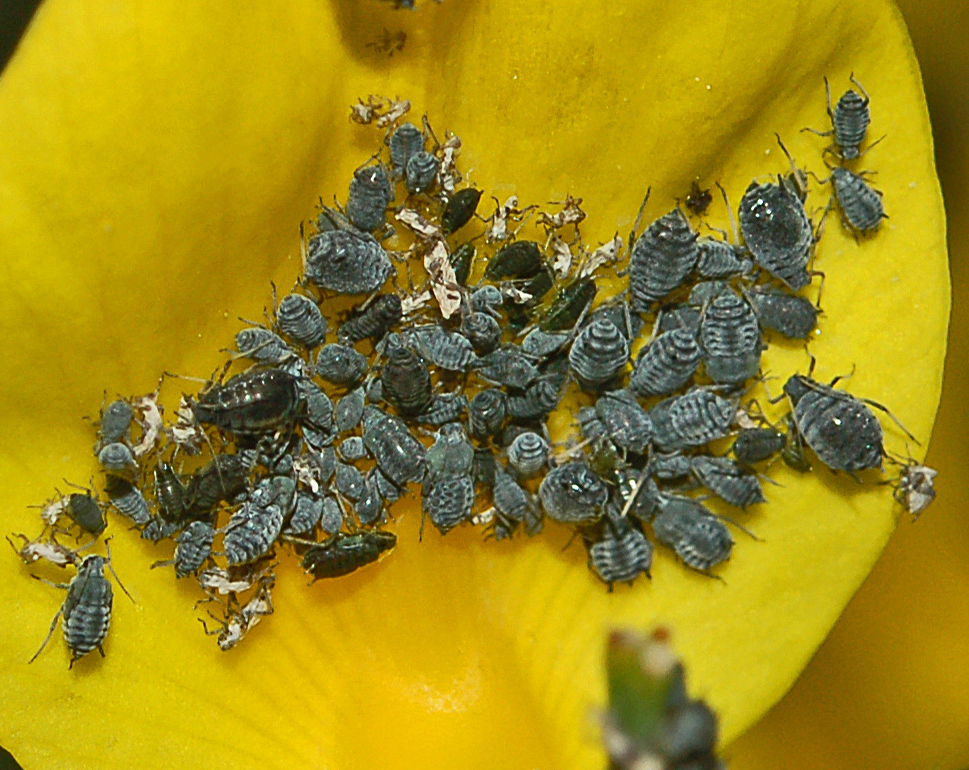
- Aphis genistae on flowers of Genista species

Scientific classification
- Kingdom: Animalia
- Phylum: Arthropoda
- Clade: Pancrustacea
- Class: Insecta
- Order: Hemiptera
- Suborder: Sternorrhyncha
- Family: Aphididae
- Genus: Aphis
- Species: A. genistae

Binomial name
- Aphis genistae Scopoli 1763

Synonyms
- Aphis genistae Kaltenbach, 1843

= Aphis genistae =

Species of true bug

Aphis genistae is an aphid of the family Aphididae.

== Distribution ==
This species can be found in most of Europe eastward to Ukraine and Turkey, and in the Nearctic realm (it has been introduced to North America).

== Description ==
Aphis genistae can reach a length of 1.4–2.6 millimetres (0.055–0.102 in). Apterae are black, coated with wax meal, while alatae have 4-8 secondary rhinaria.

== Biology ==
These insects mainly feed on small branches and flowers of Genista anglica, Genista lydia and Genista tinctoria (hence the species name), but they have also been collected on Laburnum, Cytisus, Petteria, Spartium and Sophora species. These aphids sometimes have a mutualistic relationship with ants. They are holocyclic (sex is involved, leading to egg production) and oviparae. Sexual females mate with the alate males in September to produce overwintering eggs.

== Bibliography ==
- Eastop, V.F.; Ris Lambers, D. Hille (1976). Junk, W. (ed.). Survey of the world's aphids. The Hague. ISBN 906193561X. OCLC 422331720.
- Prieto, F.G.; Hidalgo, N.P.; Durante, M.P.M.; Nafria, J.M.N. (2004). "Updated check-list of Iberian-Balearic Aphidini (Hemiptera, Aphididae)". Graellsia. 60 (2): 197–214. doi:10.3989/graellsia.2004.v60.i2.215. ISSN 1989-953X.
- Lambers, D. Hille Ris (1955). "On aphids from the Netherlands with descriptions of new species (Aphididae, Homoptera)". Tijdschrift voor Entomologie. 98 (4): 229–249.
- Lambers, D. Hille Ris (1959). "Notes on European aphids with descriptions of new genera and species (Homoptera, Aphididae)". Mitteilungen der Schweizerischen Entomologischen Gesellschaft. 32 (2–3): 271–286.
- Jacob, F.H. (1945). "Note on the classification of the British species of "black aphides" (Hemiptera, Aphididae)". Proceedings of the Royal Entomological Society of London, Series B. 14 (7): 102–110. doi:10.1111/j.1365-3113.1945.tb00031.x.
- Kaltenbach (1843), Monographie der Familien der Pflanzenläuse (Phytophthires), P. Fagot, Aachen 222 pp
- Mordvilko, A.K. (1908). "Tableaux pour servir à la détermination des groupes et des genres des Aphididae Passerini". Ezegodnik Zoologiceskago Muzeja Imperatorskoj Nauk Sankt Peterburg. 13: 353–384.
- Blackman, R.L.; Eastop, Victor F. (2008). Aphids on the World's Herbaceous Plants and Shrubs. Wiley. ISBN 9780470519592.
- Remaudière, G.; Remaudière, M. (1997). Catalogue of the World's Aphididae. Techniques et pratiques. Paris: INRA. ISBN 2738007147.
