= Aphis affinis =

Scientific classification
- Kingdom: Animalia
- Phylum: Arthropoda
- Clade: Pancrustacea
- Class: Insecta
- Order: Hemiptera
- Suborder: Sternorrhyncha
- Family: Aphididae
- Genus: Aphis
- Species: A. affinis

Binomial name
- Aphis affinis del Guercio, 1911

Species of true bug

Aphis affinis is an aphid of the family Aphididae. The species was described by Giacomo del Guercio in 1911. It is found in southern Europe, the Middle East and the Indian subcontinent. Ladybird predator species of A. affinis include Brumoides suturalis, Cheilomenes sexmaculata and Coccinella transversalis.
