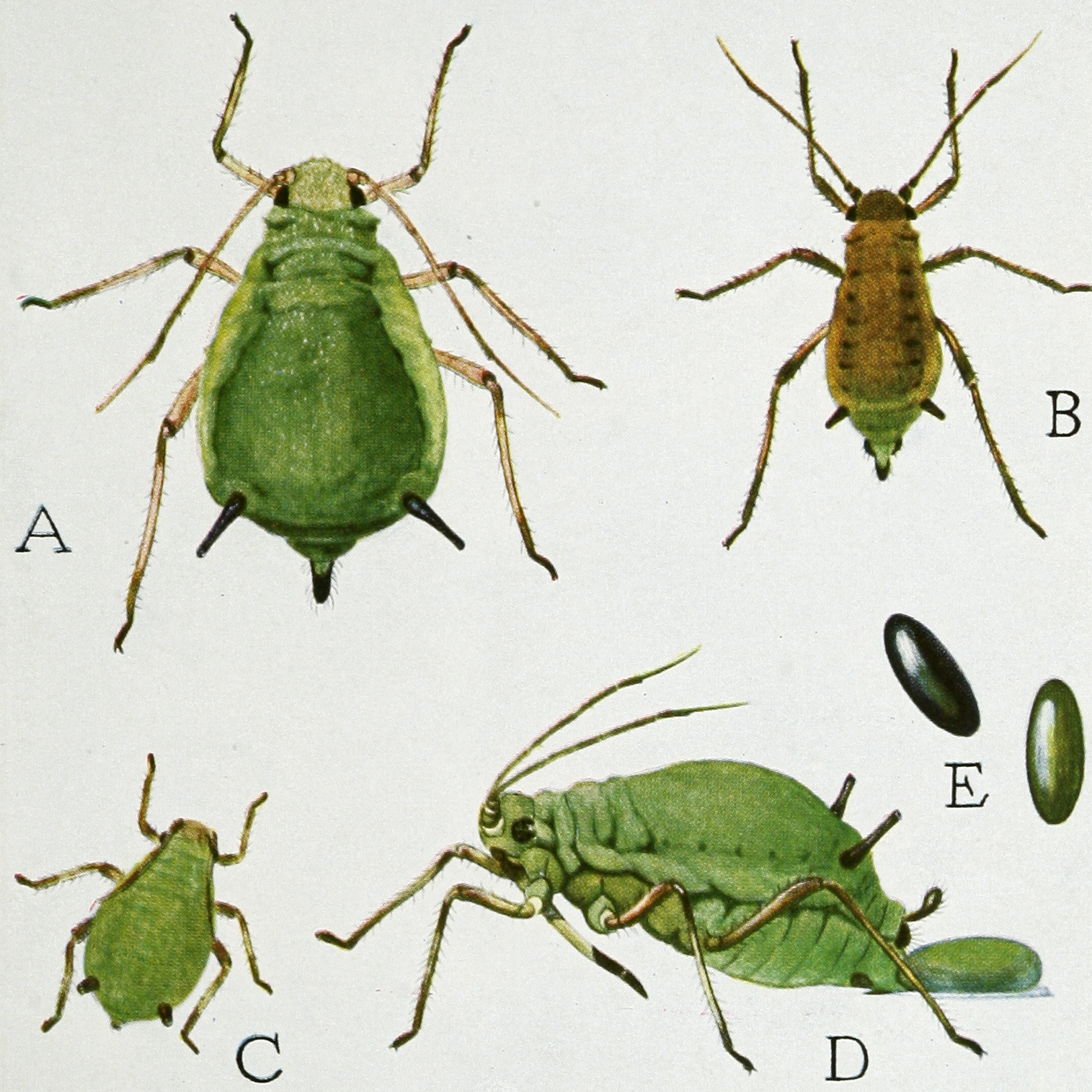
- The life stages of the green apple aphid

Scientific classification
- Kingdom: Animalia
- Phylum: Arthropoda
- Clade: Pancrustacea
- Class: Insecta
- Order: Hemiptera
- Suborder: Sternorrhyncha
- Family: Aphididae
- Genus: Aphis
- Species: A. pomi

Binomial name
- Aphis pomi de Geer, 1773

Synonyms
- Aphis mali; Aphidula pomi; Doralis pomi

= Aphis pomi =

Species of true bug

Aphis pomi, commonly known as the apple aphid (the literal meaning of its binomial name), or the green apple aphid, is a true bug in the family Aphididae. It is found on young growth of apple trees and on other members of the rose family where it feeds by sucking sap. Reproduction is mainly by parthenogenesis, in which unmated females give birth to live young.

== Description ==
Wingless females have a pear-shaped bright green or yellowish-green body, undusted with wax particles, and grow to a maximum length of about 2.2 mm (0.09 in). The cauda (tail-like elongation of the body) and cornicles are black and the antennae and legs are pale with brown tips. Winged females have a black thorax and green abdomen, often with three pairs of blackish spots on the front three segments and dark semicircular spots in front of and behind the cornicles.

== Distribution ==
Aphis pomi has a widespread distribution in Europe, western Asia as far east as India and Pakistan, North Africa and North America. In Israel and the eastern United States, the more common aphid on apple trees is the spirea aphid, Aphis spiraecola. This has a wide range of host plants and a faster rate of reproduction than A. pomi, especially at high temperatures.

== Ecology ==
Besides occurring on apple (Malus domestica), Aphis pomi infests other plants in the family Rosaceae including pear (Pyrus communis ), hawthorn (Crataegus monogyna), medlar (Mespilus germanica), quince (Cydonia oblonga), mountain ash (Sorbus aucuparia), rose (Rosa) and spiraea (Spiraea). It is an autoecious species, completing its life cycle on a single host species.

Overwintering eggs hatch in spring and the aphids colonise the growing tips of the shoots causing the edges of the leaves to curl. These aphids are all viviparous females and give birth to other wingless aphids by parthenogenesis. In June some winged females are produced and these migrate to other branches and trees, and large aggregations build up by late summer. There may be ten to fifteen generations of aphid during the season and winds may disperse the winged forms over many kilometres. Sexual forms are produced in the autumn, winged egg-laying females and wingless males. Mating takes place and eggs are laid near the tips of the shoots, sometimes in large batches. These are green at first but soon turn black.

Ants are often present among the colonies, feeding on the honeydew secreted by the aphids. The presence of the ants is beneficial to the aphids as the ants deter and remove predators that might feed on the aphids; these include the larvae of the midge Aphidoletes aphidimyza and parasitoids which lay their eggs in the aphid nymphs. High levels of infestation by the aphids can cause stunted shoots, disfigured fruit and premature leaf fall, especially in young trees, and sooty mould may form on excess honeydew secretions.
