= Aptery =

State of winglessness

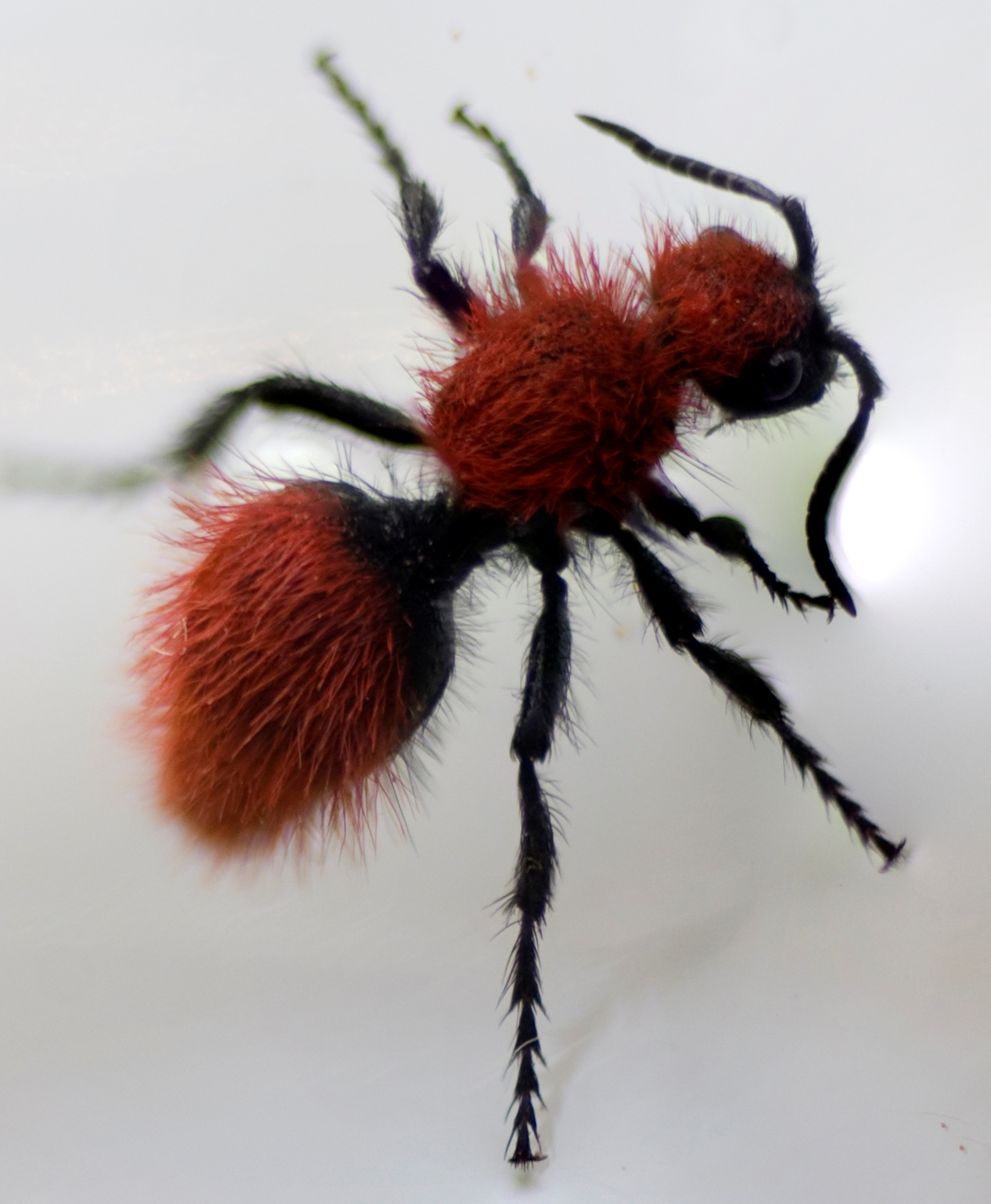
Female velvet ants are an example of secondary aptery, as they belong to a taxon of winged insects, the wasp superfamily Vespoidea. Furthermore, male velvet ants are fully winged.

Aptery is the anatomical condition of an animal completely lacking any kind of wings. An animal with this condition is said to be apterous.

Most animal species belong to and are phylogenetic descendants of apterous taxa (as all wings are thought to be a derived feature and having evolved later on). These groups are said to be primarily apterous. Insects that are primarily apterous belong to the subclass Apterygota.

Apterous is an adjective that means that the insect or organism is wingless and usually refers to a particular form of an insect that may have wings, or a wingless species in a group that typically has wings, e.g. many Orthoptera (grasshoppers and allies) and Hymenoptera (wasps). In some groups, one sex may be apterous while the other is winged, e.g. Mutillidae (velvet ants) and Coccoidea (scale insects). In other cases, a particular form of an insect (but not all individuals) will be apterous, e.g. some Tetrigidae (pygmy grasshoppers). Wingless animals which belong to or are phylogenetic descendants of winged taxa are said to be secondarily apterous. Five percent of extant Pterygota are believed to be secondarily apterous, including entire orders, such as fleas and Notoptera.

== See also ==
- Brachyptery (reduced wings)
