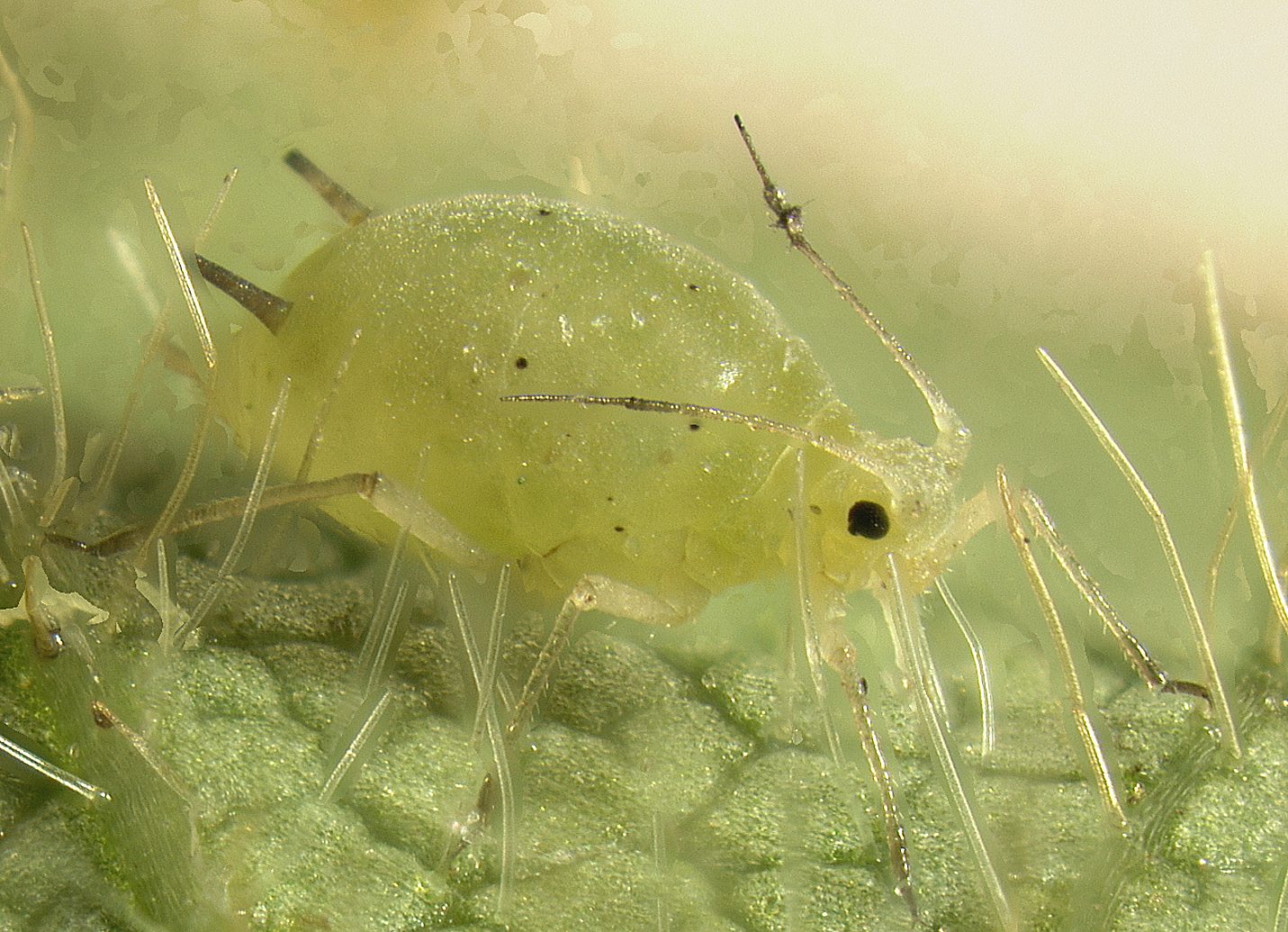
- Soybean aphid

Scientific classification
- Kingdom: Animalia
- Phylum: Arthropoda
- Class: Insecta
- Order: Hemiptera
- Suborder: Sternorrhyncha
- Family: Aphididae
- Tribe: Aphidini
- Genus: Aphis; Linnaeus, 1758

Type species
- Aphis sambuci Linnaeus, 1758

Diversity
- at least 600 species

= Aphis =

Genus of true bugs

Aphis is a genus of insects in the family Aphididae containing at least 600 species of aphids. It includes many notorious agricultural pests, such as the soybean aphid Aphis glycines. Many species of Aphis, such as A. coreopsidis and A. fabae, are myrmecophiles, forming close associations with ants.

== Selected Species ==
- Aphis affinis
- Aphis asclepiadis — milkweed aphid
- Aphis craccae — tufted vetch aphid
- Aphis craccivora — cowpea aphid
- Aphis fabae — black bean aphid
- Aphis genistae
- Aphis gossypii — cotton aphid
- Aphis glycines — soybean aphid
- Aphis helianthi — sunflower aphid
- Aphis nerii — oleander aphid
- Aphis pomi — apple aphid
- Aphis rubicola — small raspberry aphid
- Aphis rumicis - black aphid
- Aphis spiraecola — spirea aphid (syn. Aphis citricola — citrus aphid)
- Aphis valerianae — black valerian aphid

== See also ==
- List of Aphis species

== Photos and videos ==
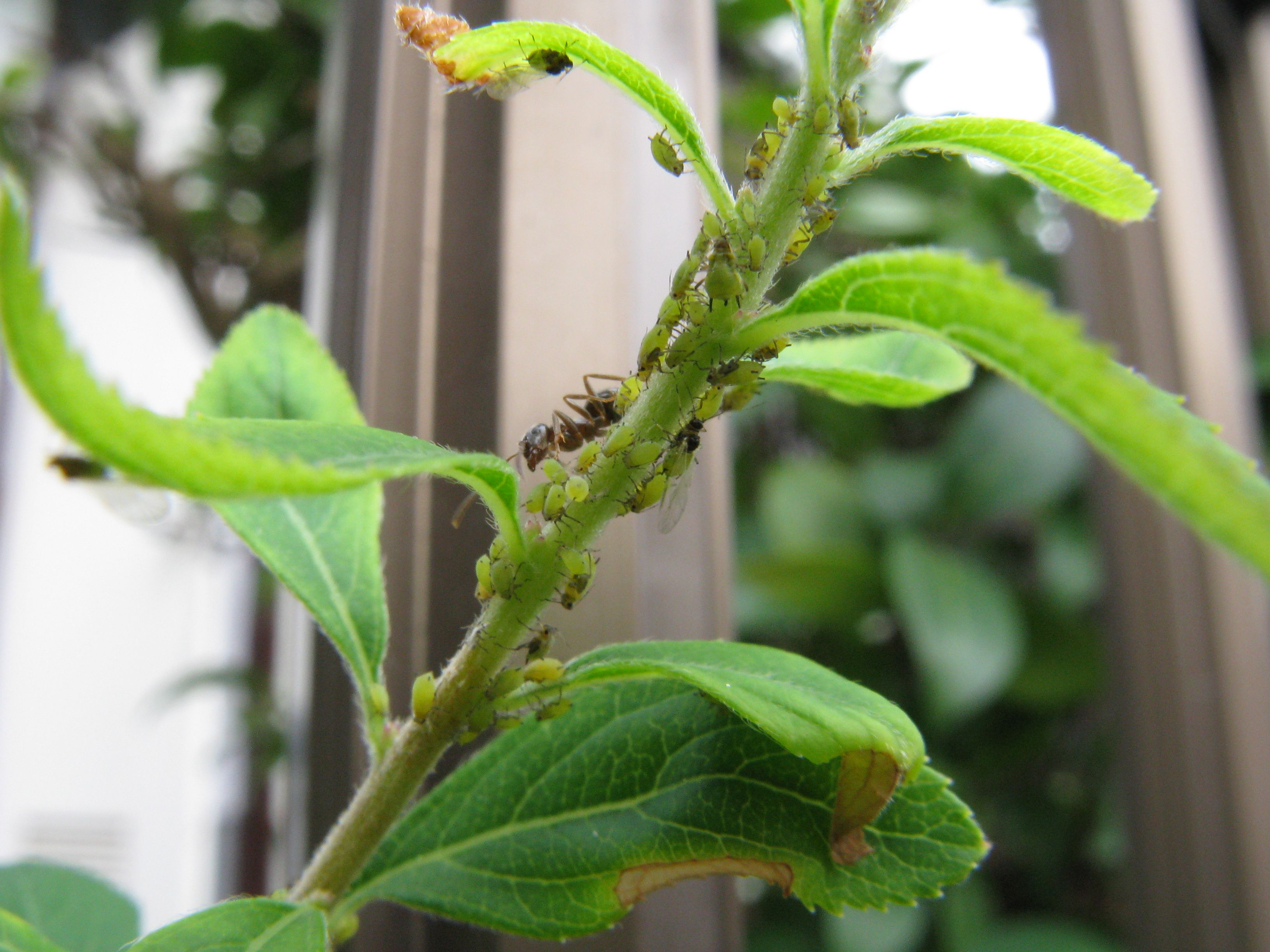
Aphis citricola

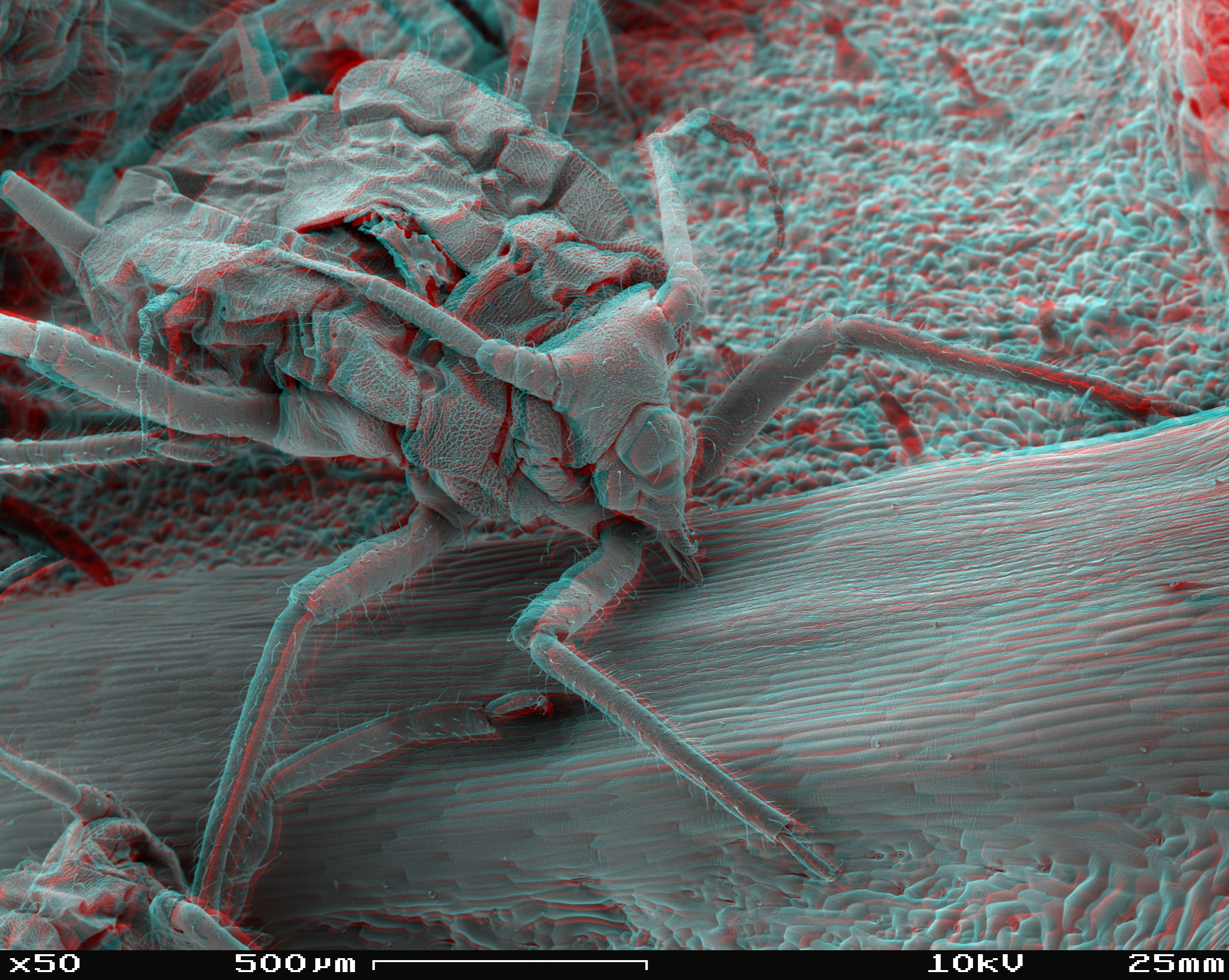
Aphis fabae

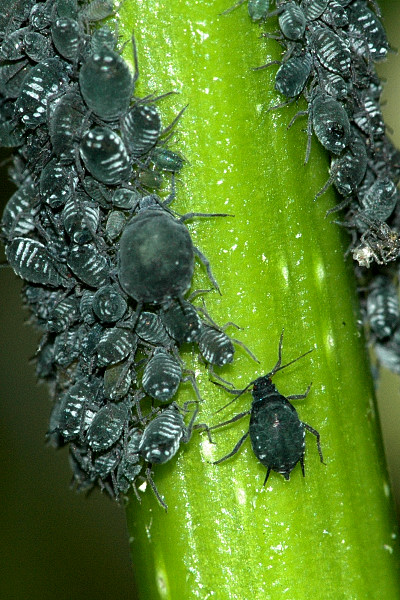
Aphis sambuci

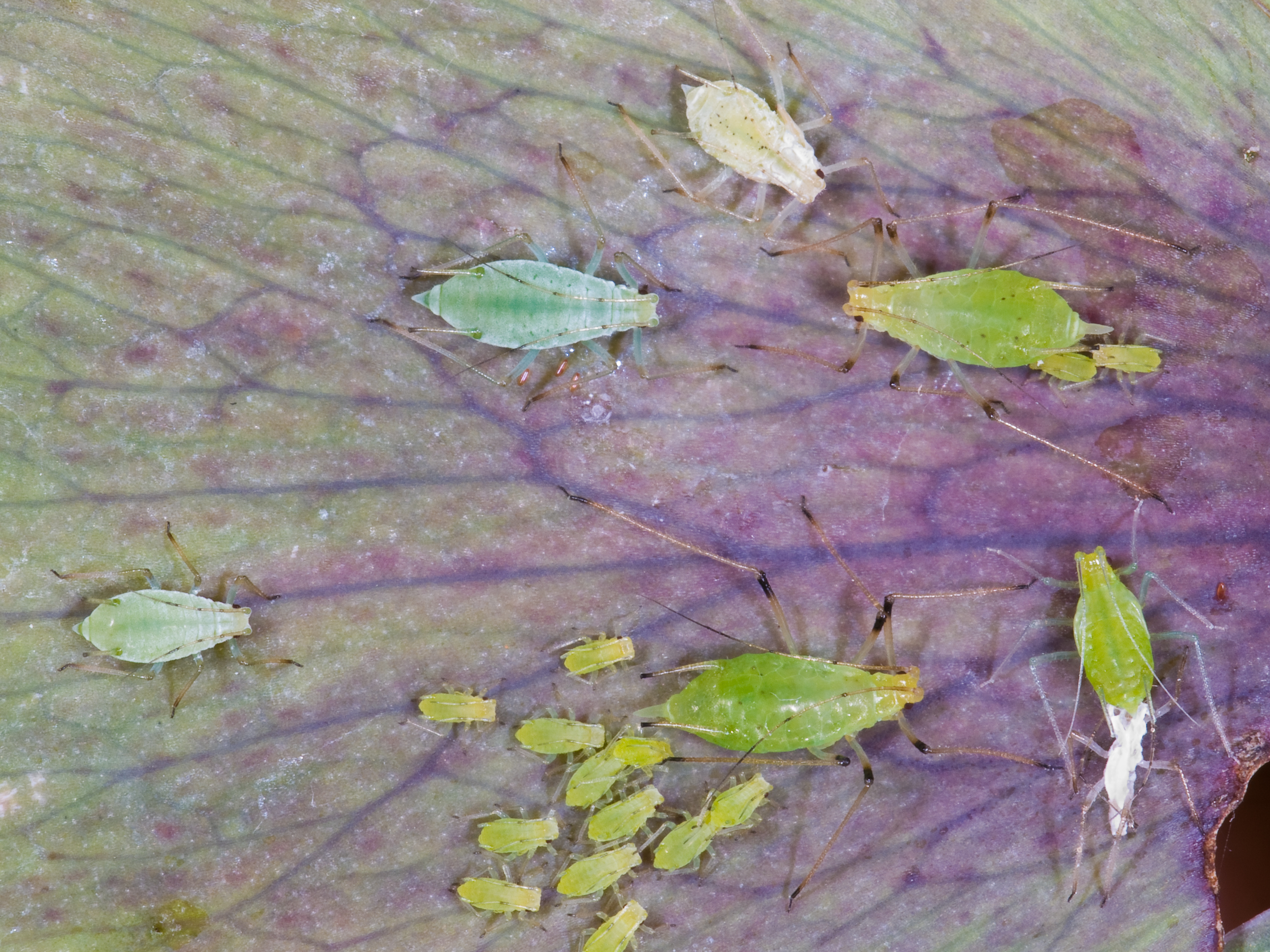
Aphis sp. on Helleborus niger

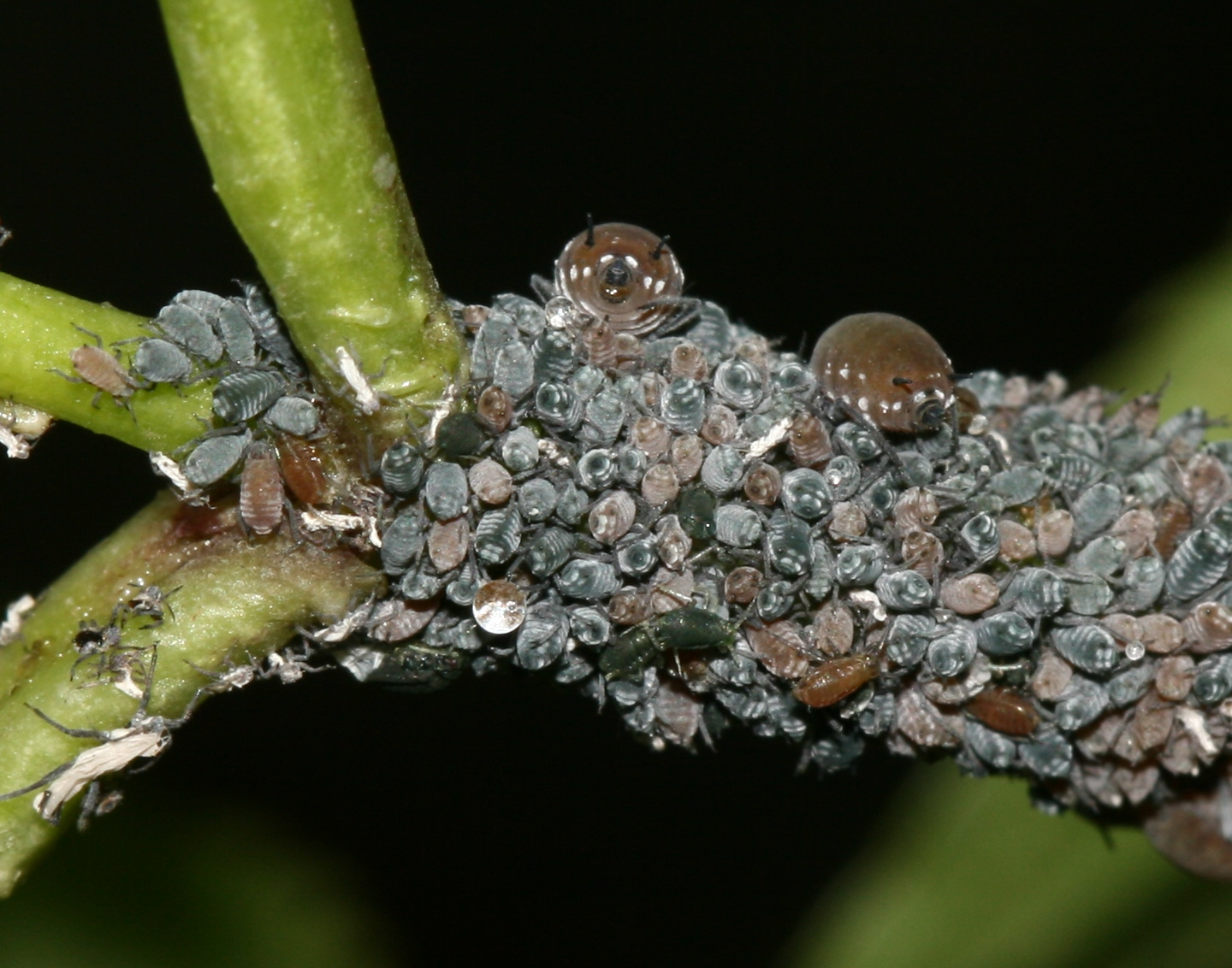
Aphis sambuci

Milkweed aphids giving live birth on narrow leaf milkweed. Speeded up twenty times

A European paper wasp preying on Milkweed aphids which are on narrow leaf milkweed. Most scenes are repeated at one-fourth speed.

Milkweed aphids on narrow-leaf milkweed eliminating honeydew. Unlike some aphids, these kick the drop away with their leg

A milkweed aphid on narrow-leaf milkweed is attacked by a hoverfly larvae. It thrashs and release pheromones and sticky wax from its cornicles. Nearby aphids flee. Video played at 4X speed

A milkweed aphid pushes the sticky wax drop from its cornicle against an attacking parasitic wasp, extruding another drop. Two scenes at one-tenth speed. A different aphid has captured a wasp

Hoverfly larva on narrow-leaf milkweed with milkweed aphids, ladybird eggs, and larva. After first minute, shown at four times speed. Larva recorded in early morning prior to sunrise
