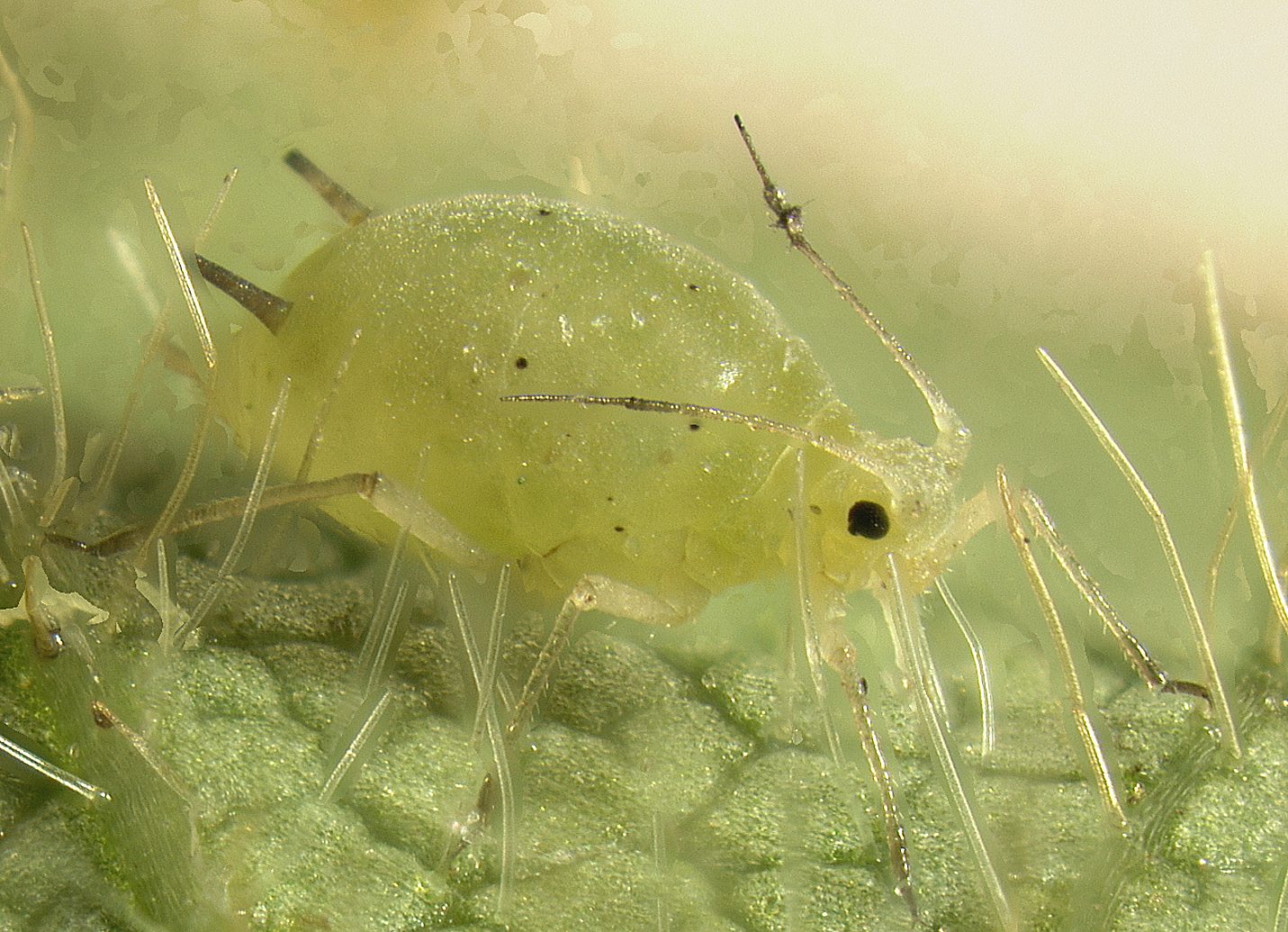

Scientific classification
- Kingdom: Animalia
- Phylum: Arthropoda
- Clade: Pancrustacea
- Class: Insecta
- Order: Hemiptera
- Suborder: Sternorrhyncha
- Family: Aphididae
- Genus: Aphis
- Species: A. glycines

Binomial name
- Aphis glycines Matsumura

= Soybean aphid =

Species of true bug

The soybean aphid (Aphis glycines) is an insect pest of soybean (Glycine max) native to Asia. It has been described as a common pest of soybeans in China and as an occasional pest of soybeans in Indonesia, Japan, Korea, Malaysia, the Philippines, and Thailand. Exotic to North America, the soybean aphid was first documented in the continent in Wisconsin in July 2000. Ragsdale et al. (2004) noted that the soybean aphid probably arrived in North America earlier than 2000, but remained undetected for a period of time. Venette and Ragsdale (2004) suggested that Japan probably served as the point of origin for the soybean aphid's North American invasion. By 2003, the soybean aphid had been documented in Delaware, Georgia, Illinois, Indiana, Iowa, Kansas, Kentucky, Michigan, Minnesota, Mississippi, Missouri, Nebraska, New York, North Dakota, Ohio, Pennsylvania, South Dakota, Virginia, West Virginia, and Wisconsin. Together, these states accounted for 89% of the 63,600,000 acres (257,000 km^{2}) of soybean planted in the United States in 2007.

== Life history ==
The soybean aphid possesses a heteroecious holocyclic life cycle, which means the insect alternates hosts and undergoes sexual reproduction for at least part of its life cycle. Soybean aphids overwinter as eggs on their primary hosts, buckthorn (Rhamnus spp.). Eggs can be located near buds or within crevices of branches. With a mean supercooling point of −34 °C (−29 °F), eggs are well-adapted for surviving cold winters.

In two studies, the quantity of overwintering eggs had a strong positive correlation with the severity of soybean aphid outbreaks in the following spring.

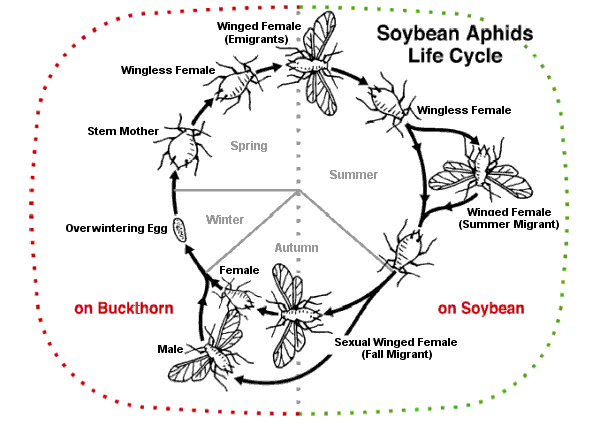
Soybean aphid life cycle

Eggs begin to hatch into fundatrices when temperatures in the spring reach 10 °C (50 °F). Colonization of buckthorn by soybean aphids in the spring can lead to curling of leaves and twigs. Near the blooming stage of buckthorn, fundatrices reproduce parthenogenetically to give viviparous birth to alatae. These winged soybean aphids begin the spring migration to their secondary host, soybean. Soybean aphids go through approximately 15 generations on soybean, all of which are primarily composed of apterous females produced through viviparous parthenogenesis. Each generation passes through 4 instars and can range from 2 to 16 days in length, with higher temperatures increasing development and decreasing generation time.

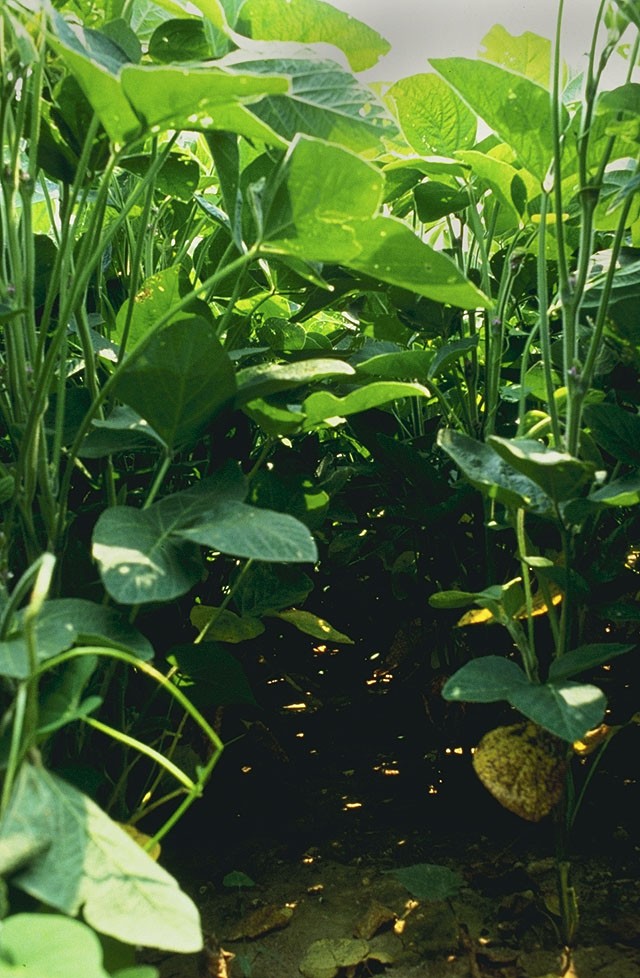
Soybean plants

Feeding by soybean aphids injures soybean by interfering with photosynthetic pathways—more specifically, biological mechanisms responsible for restoring chlorophyll to a low energy state are impaired. This restoration process is known as quenching and is important for plants to execute light reactions properly. Reduction in photosynthetic capacity of soybean may occur before plants begin to display symptoms of injury.

Infestation of soybean aphids on soybean can be classified into three stages. The first stage occurs when alatae migrate to soybean in late May and early June. During this stage, small colonies of soybean aphids appear patchy, occurring on single plants scattered throughout a field. In these early colonies, soybean aphids are typically grouped on tender, young leaves of soybean plants. As the infested plant ages, soybean aphids remain on leaves near the top of the plant. Studies have demonstrated a positive correlation exists between upper leaf nitrogen content of soybean and the occurrence of soybean aphids. Damage to a soybean plant during this initial stage is a result of stylet-feeding and can include curling and stunting of leaves and twigs, physiological delays, and underdevelopment of root tissue. However, the relatively low densities of soybean aphids during this stage have been found to have minimal impacts on soybean yield.

The second stage, or pre-peak stage, can begin as early as late June and is characterized by dramatic increases in densities of soybean aphids. As colonies expand and temperatures increase, soybean aphids move toward lower portions of the soybean plant. The optimal temperature for soybean aphid development occurs between 25 and 30 °C, and exposure to prolonged temperatures of 35 °C (95 °F) decrease survival rates and fecundity of soybean aphids. Extremely high population growth rates can be achieved under optimal conditions, with a colony doubling in size in as few as 1.3 days.

The final stage of infestation by soybean aphids on soybean, or peak stage, begins in mid- to late July and is characterized by very high densities of soybean aphids. As populations grow during this stage, plant damage may become severe. Heavy infestations of soybean aphids may cause plant stunting, distorted foliage, premature defoliation, stunted stems and leaves, reduced branch, pod, and seed numbers, lower seed weight, and underdevelopment of root tissue. Yield losses as high as 50 to 70% have been documented as a result of prolonged exposure to high densities of soybean aphids.

When populations of soybean aphids increase, a need arises for apterae to produce alate offspring to seek out new hosts. This can be due to both deteriorating host plant quality and crowding effects. Crowding of nymphal apterae will not cause them to develop into alate adults. Crowding effects on alatae can induce alate offspring production as well, although alatae are not as sensitive to crowding as apterae. Soybean plants are prevented from becoming super-saturated by emigration of soybean aphids through alate production, which serves to maintain an equilibrium density of soybean aphids. Decreased body size and lowered fecundity can be induced in soybean aphids when populations reach very high densities.

As host plant quality begins to deteriorate in late August and early September, soybean aphids take on a paler color and experience decreased growth and reproductive rates. High densities of soybean aphids during these late plant stages have less of a significant negative impact on soybean yield. During this period of declining temperatures and decreasing rainfall, soybean plants undergo senescence gradually from bottom to top, causing an upward movement of soybean aphids to higher plant tissue.

After going through approximately 15 generations on soybean, soybean aphids begin to transition back to their primary host, buckthorn. A generation of winged females, gynoparae, develop on soybean and leave for buckthorn when mature. Simultaneously, an apterous population of soybean aphids remains on soybean to produce alate male sexual morphs. Factors that positively affect the production of gynoparae and male alatae include declining host plant quality, shortened day length, and lowered temperatures.

While on buckthorn, gynoparae produce a generation of apterous female sexual morphs (oviparae) that mate with male alatae to produce overwintering eggs. As buckthorn experiences increased feeding pressure by oviparae, volatile emissions from the plant are significantly decreased, possibly serving as a defense mechanism to inhibit further colonization by soybean aphids. Male alatae locate oviparae on buckthorn through two sex pheromones commonly found in aphid species, (1R,4aS,7S,7aR)-nepetalactol and (4aS,7S,7aR)-nepetalactone, that are emitted by oviparae in a species-specific combination. After mating on buckthorn, oviparae deposit their eggs on the plant. Ragsdale et al. (2004) proposed that movement from soybean to buckthorn may produce a bottleneck effect that inhibits the ability of soybean aphids to overwinter in great numbers.

== Host plant biology ==
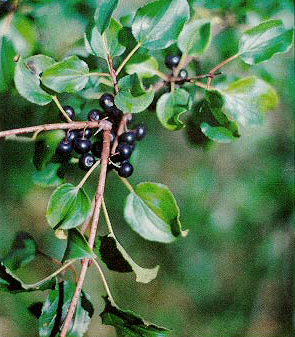
A buckthorn plant

More than 100 species of Rhamnus exist worldwide, and most of these species are native to temperate regions of the Northern Hemisphere. Rhamnus species are plentiful in North America. Two confirmed Rhamnus species that support overwintering of soybean aphids in North America are common buckthorn (Rhamnus cathartica) of exotic origin and alderleaf buckthorn (Rhamnus alnifolia) of native origin. Another widespread Rhamnus species of exotic origin in North America is alder buckthorn (Rhamnus frangula); however, neither mature oviparae nor eggs have been documented on this potential host.

In an experiment to determine alternate primary hosts for soybean aphids, only members of the genus Rhamnus were able to support development of soybean aphids. In Asia, where the soybean aphid is native, dominant primary hosts include Japanese buckthorn (Rhamnus japonica) and Dahurian buckthorn (Rhamnus davurica). One study indicated certain plant species may play a role in bridging colonization of soybean from buckthorn. One such species that is readily available in early spring is red clover (Trifolium pratense). An experiment further reinforced this relationship by demonstrating that soybean aphids can develop on red clover in a laboratory setting.

The most common secondary host in both Asia and North America for soybean aphids is soybean. Soybean has been cultivated in Asia for 4,000 to 5,000 years and in the United States since 1904. Du et al. (1994) demonstrated that the primary method by which soybean aphids locate soybean is through olfactory chemical signaling. Interference by non-host odors diminished the ability of soybean aphids to locate and colonize soybean.

Deleterious effects of soybean aphids on soybean can be highly variable and are influenced by factors like soybean aphid density, plant stage, plant density, and temperature. In addition, soil nutrient conditions within a soybean field may play some role in the development of infestations of soybean aphids. For example, in a laboratory experiment, soybean aphids that fed on potassium-deficient soybean experienced increased fecundity and survivorship. Field experiments failed to corroborate this finding. Myers et al. (2005a) hypothesized that potassium-stress in the laboratory may lead to increased nitrogen availability for soybean aphids. Yield data taken from this experiment showed that potassium-stress in conjunction with infestation by soybean aphids caused significant yield loss.

Specificity for soybean aphids to feed on soybean has been demonstrated by Han and Yan (1995) in an experiment utilizing an electrical penetration graph. While no difference in the amount of time spent probing between soybean and other non-host plants was observed, the ingestion of phloem by soybean aphids was either greatly reduced or did not happen at all on non-host plants. Nevertheless, some alternate secondary hosts have been observed for soybean aphids. The most widespread of these alternate secondary hosts is wild soybean (Glycine soja), which has been known to support colonies of soybean aphids in Asia. In Korea and the Philippines, kudzu (Pueraria montana) and tropical kudzu (Pueraria javanica) have been described as alternate secondary hosts, respectively.

== Virus transmission ==
Soybean aphids may indirectly affect plant health through viral transmission. Viruses spread by soybean aphids are typically vectored non-persistently, which allows for disease transmission in the first moments of stylet penetration. Non-persistent transmission does not limit viruses vectored by soybean aphids to soybean, but rather to any plant that alate soybean aphids contact and probe with their stylets for a brief period of time. Unlike stationary apterae, only alatae have been shown to transmit viruses between plants. Incidence of non-persistently transmitted viruses has been shown to increase when flight activity of the vector is high, leading to the belief that the risk of virus transmission by soybean aphids may increase during times of high dispersal, such as the end of the peak stage.

In China, the most important virus vectored by the soybean aphid is Soybean mosaic virus, which can cause yield loss and decreased seed quality. This virus is also found in North America and has been demonstrated as being vectored by the soybean aphid in field studies. In addition to Soybean mosaic virus, the soybean aphid is capable of transmitting Soybean stunt virus, Soybean dwarf virus, Abaca mosaic virus, Alfalfa mosaic virus, Beet mosaic virus, Tobacco vein-banding virus, Tobacco ringspot virus, Bean yellow mosaic virus, Mungbean mosaic virus, Peanut mottle virus, Peanut stripe poty virus, and Peanut mosaic virus.

== Host plant resistance ==
Several varieties of soybean have demonstrated resistance to the soybean aphid. Resistance may be conferred by antibiosis, antixenosis, or tolerance. In some instances, such as with the soybean cultivars 'Dowling', 'Jackson', and 'Palmetto', resistance to the soybean aphid results from a combination of both antibiosis and antixenosis. In the 'Dowling' cultivar, resistance is conferred by a single dominant gene (Rag1). Soybean plants that are resistant to the soybean aphid can cause both reduced fecundity and longevity in soybean aphids. In the case of antibiosis, certain life stages of the soybean aphid may be more susceptible than others. For example, nymphs have higher rates of metabolism than other life stages, ingest more phloem, and are thus exposed to larger quantities of antibiotic compounds. Expression of antibiotic factors in resistant soybean plants that negatively affect soybean aphids has been shown to remain constant throughout the growing season, remaining unaffected by the physiological maturity of the plant. Colonization of resistant soybean cultivars can vary between years depending upon the level of infestation, with resistant plants showing lower levels of resistance in years with significant levels of soybean aphid infestation. Physical characteristics of soybean, such as dense pubescence, have thus far proven incapable of reducing colonization by soybean aphids.

== Natural enemies ==
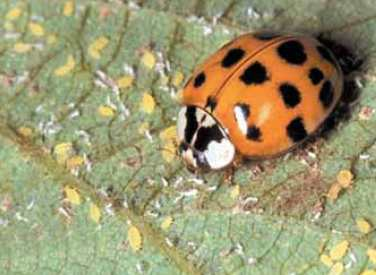
Harmonia axyridis feeding on soybean aphids

In Asia, the soybean aphid experiences pressure from over 30 species of predators, 8 species of parasitoids, and some fungal pathogens. In Indonesia, where the soybean aphid is considered an occasional pest, evidence indicates the use of insecticides to control soybean aphids may not always be necessary due to suppression of the insect to subeconomic densities by natural enemies alone. In North America, the dominant natural enemies in soybean are generalist predators. Exclusion cage experiments have provided evidence that predators can play an important role in suppression of the soybean aphid. Impacts from predators include both the ability to suppress colony establishment early in the season as well as respond to increased densities of soybean aphids late in the season.

One of the most important predators of soybean aphids in North America is the insidious flower bug (Orius insidiosus (Say)). The insidious flower bug has its greatest impact on early to mid-season populations of soybean aphids and is often able to keep soybean aphid densities low. Fox et al. (2004) hypothesized that the impact from this predator early in the season could be attributed to small plant size and sparse canopies, which aid the insidious flower bug by reducing foraging time and decreasing the number of places soybean aphids can hide (i.e., enemy-free space). In addition, synomones released by soybean after being colonized by soybean aphids may aid the insidious flower bug in host location. When populations of soybean aphids reach very high densities, top-down pressure exerted by the insidious flower bug may fail to suppress colony growth of soybean aphids.

Another group of predators that plays a key role in suppression of populations of soybean aphids in North America is lady beetles (Coccinellidae spp.). Some prevalent species in soybean include the twospotted lady beetle (Adalia bipunctata L.), the sevenspotted lady beetle (Coccinella septempunctata L.), the spotted lady beetle (Coleomegilla maculata De Geer), the polished lady beetle (Cycloneda munda (Say)), the multicolored Asian lady beetle (Harmonia axyridis (Pallas)), the convergent lady beetle (Hippodamia convergens Guérin-Méneville), and the thirteen spotted lady beetle (Hippodamia tredecimpunctata L.).

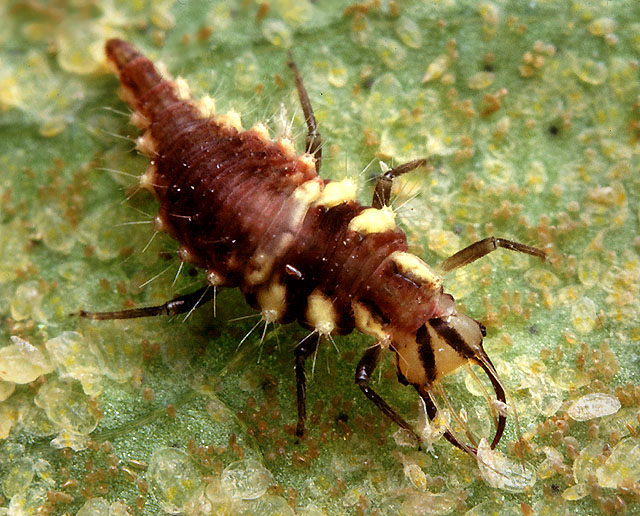
Green lacewing larva

Evidence suggests that populations of lady beetles can respond to increases in populations of soybean aphids in soybean. In addition, increases in populations of lady beetles have the ability to inhibit colony growth of soybean aphids throughout the growing season. As generalist predators, lady beetles are able to feed on alternate prey when soybean aphids are at low densities. Other characteristics of lady beetles that are advantageous in times of soybean aphid scarcity include developmental delays of certain life stages, decreased body weights, and reduced clutch sizes. One of the most competitive lady beetles in North America, the multicolored Asian lady beetle, is of exotic origin. When soybean aphids are plentiful, an adult multicolored Asian lady beetle has the capacity to consume 160 soybean aphids per day.

Other foliar-foraging predators that are present North American soybean fields that may play a role in suppression of soybean aphid populations include green lacewings (Chrysoperla spp.), brown lacewings (Hemerobius spp.), damsel bugs (Nabis spp.), big eyed bugs (Geocoris spp.), spined soldier bugs (Podisus maculiventris (Say)), hover flies (Syrphidae spp.), and the aphid midge (Aphidoletes aphidimyza (Rondani)). Another group of predators that are present in soybean fields is ground beetles (Carabidae spp.); however, field experiments have shown limited to no impact from these predators on populations of soybean aphids due to the fact that ground beetles rarely scale soybean plants for prey. While parasitoids of the soybean aphid have a large impact on colonies in Asia—Lysiphlebia japonica (Ashmead) can have a soybean aphid parasitism rate as high as 52.6% in China—parasitoids are thought to exert only minimal pressure on soybean aphids in North America.

== Management ==
The use of insecticides to control populations of soybean aphids in soybean is the most effective management tactic in North America. Insecticides available to soybean producers for controlling soybean aphids include both foliar-applied treatments and seed-applied treatments. Although seed-applied treatments have proven to be a convenient delivery method for insect control, studies have experienced inconsistent results regarding their efficacy against the soybean aphid. Management decisions should be made with an understanding of soybean aphid life history and sound scouting practices rooted in the principles of integrated pest management.

The current economic threshold for soybean aphids states that an insecticide application is warranted when soybean aphid densities reach 250 soybean aphids per plant, 80% of sampled plants are infested, the population is currently increasing, and few natural enemies are observed in the field. This recommendation is only valid from the R1 (beginning bloom) to R5 (beginning seed) growth stages and is based on an economic injury level of 674 soybean aphids per plant. Due to the clumped spatial distribution of soybean aphids, Onstad et al. (2005) recommend that 50 plants should be sampled within a field to attain an accurate representation of densities of soybean aphids. Soybean producers can choose from a variety of foliar insecticides from the carbamate, pyrethroid, and organophosphate chemical families to control soybean aphids.

Evidence indicates that foliar insecticide applications can reduce symptoms associated with soybean aphid infestations, including curled leaves, shortened stems, stunted plants, and premature defoliation. Foliar insecticide applications can also prevent yield loss associated with high densities of soybean aphids. However, some risks are associated with the use of foliar insecticide applications, especially if integrated pest management principles are abandoned. A single, well-timed application may not sufficiently control soybean aphids and prevent yield loss, especially if large quantities of soybean aphids are surviving on lower leaves. Foliar insecticide applications can work detrimentally if nontarget effects are experienced, such as the unintended death of beneficial natural enemies.

Although foliar pyrethroid insectides are the current standard for soybean aphids, in 2015 in Minnesota, pyrethroid resistance was discovered. Other cases were found in 2016 in Iowa, North Dakota, South Dakota and Manitoba.
