= R. japonica =

R. japonica may refer to:

- Rana japonica, the Japanese brown frog, a frog species endemic to Japan
- Ranzania japonica, a perennial herb species native to Honshū, Japan
- Rhabdomastix japonica, a crane fly species in the genus Rhabdomastix
- Rhamnus japonica, the Japanese buckthorn, a plant species in the genus Rhamnus
- Rhomborrhina japonica, the drone beetle, a large beetle species
- Rickettsia japonica, a bacterium species that causes the Japanese spotted fever
- Rohdea japonica, the Nippon lily, sacred lily or Japanese sacred lily, a flowering plant species native from southwestern China to Japan
- Roussoellopsis japonica, a fungus species

== Synonyms ==
- Reynoutria japonica, a synonym for Fallopia japonica, the Japanese knotweed, a large herbaceous perennial plant species native to Japan, China and Korea

== See also ==
- Japonica (disambiguation)
