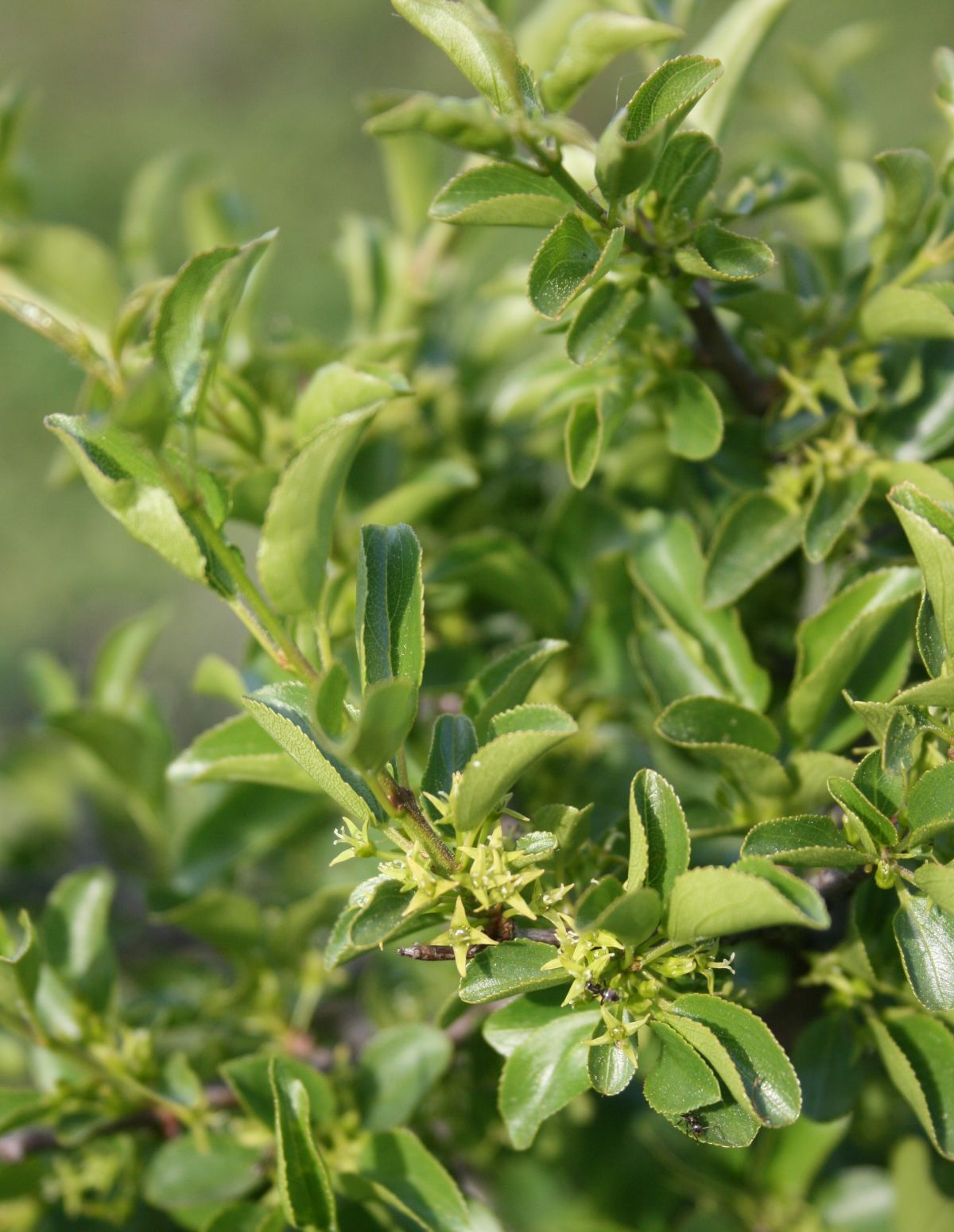

Conservation status
- Least Concern (IUCN 3.1)

Scientific classification
- Kingdom: Plantae
- Clade: Tracheophytes
- Clade: Angiosperms
- Clade: Eudicots
- Clade: Rosids
- Order: Rosales
- Family: Rhamnaceae
- Genus: Rhamnus
- Species: R. × intermedia

Binomial name
- Rhamnus × intermedia Steud. & Hochst.

= Rhamnus × intermedia =

Species of plant

Rhamnus × intermedia is a hybrid species of plant in the family Rhamnaceae. It is a hybrid between Rhamnus orbiculata and Rhamnus saxatilis. It is found in Albania, Bosnia and Herzegovina, and Croatia.
