= Rhamnus taquetii =

Conservation status
- Critically Endangered (IUCN 3.1)

Scientific classification
- Kingdom: Plantae
- Clade: Tracheophytes
- Clade: Angiosperms
- Clade: Eudicots
- Clade: Rosids
- Order: Rosales
- Family: Rhamnaceae
- Genus: Rhamnus
- Species: R. taquetii

Binomial name
- Rhamnus taquetii (H.Lév. & Vaniot) H.Lév.

Synonyms
- Prunus taquetii H.Lév. & Vaniot, 1909

Species of flowering plant

Rhamnus taquetii, (Korean: 좀갈매나무, lit. 'little buckthorn') is a species of Rhamnus native to Jeju Island, South Korea. Growing on the slopes of Mt. Halla at elevations above 1200 m, it is a bush reaching 1 m. The anthraquinone physcion and the flavonoids kaempferol, rhamnocitrin, quercetin, and 3-O-methyl quercetin were isolated from its tissues.
