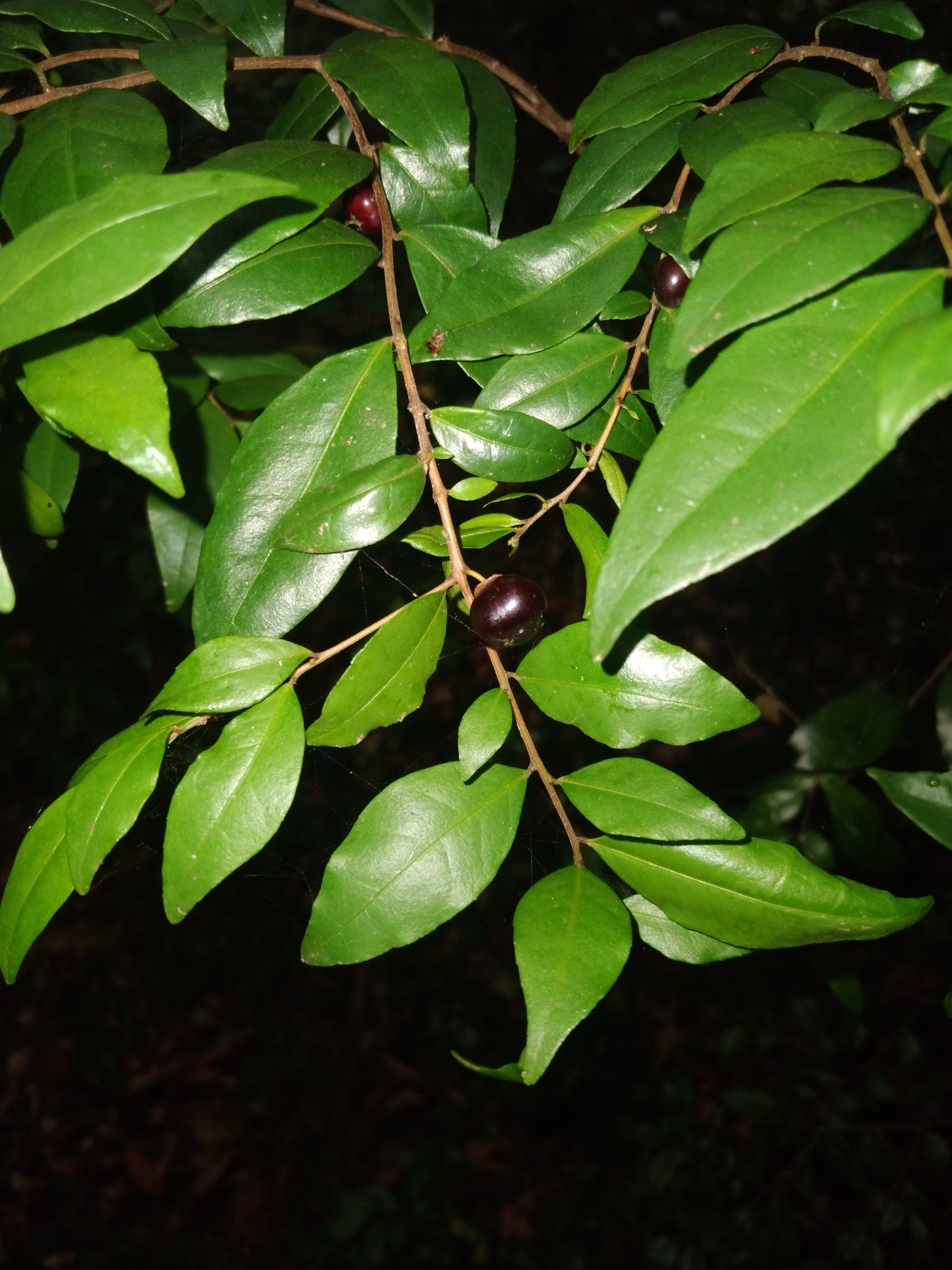

Scientific classification
- Kingdom: Plantae
- Clade: Tracheophytes
- Clade: Angiosperms
- Clade: Eudicots
- Clade: Rosids
- Order: Rosales
- Family: Rhamnaceae
- Genus: Rhamnus
- Species: R. diffusa

Binomial name
- Rhamnus diffusa Clos

= Rhamnus diffusa =

Species of plant

Rhamnus diffusa, locally known as murta negra or palo negro, is a species of flowering plant in the family Rhamnaceae. It is endemic to Chile, where it is distributed between the Maule and the Los Rios regions.
