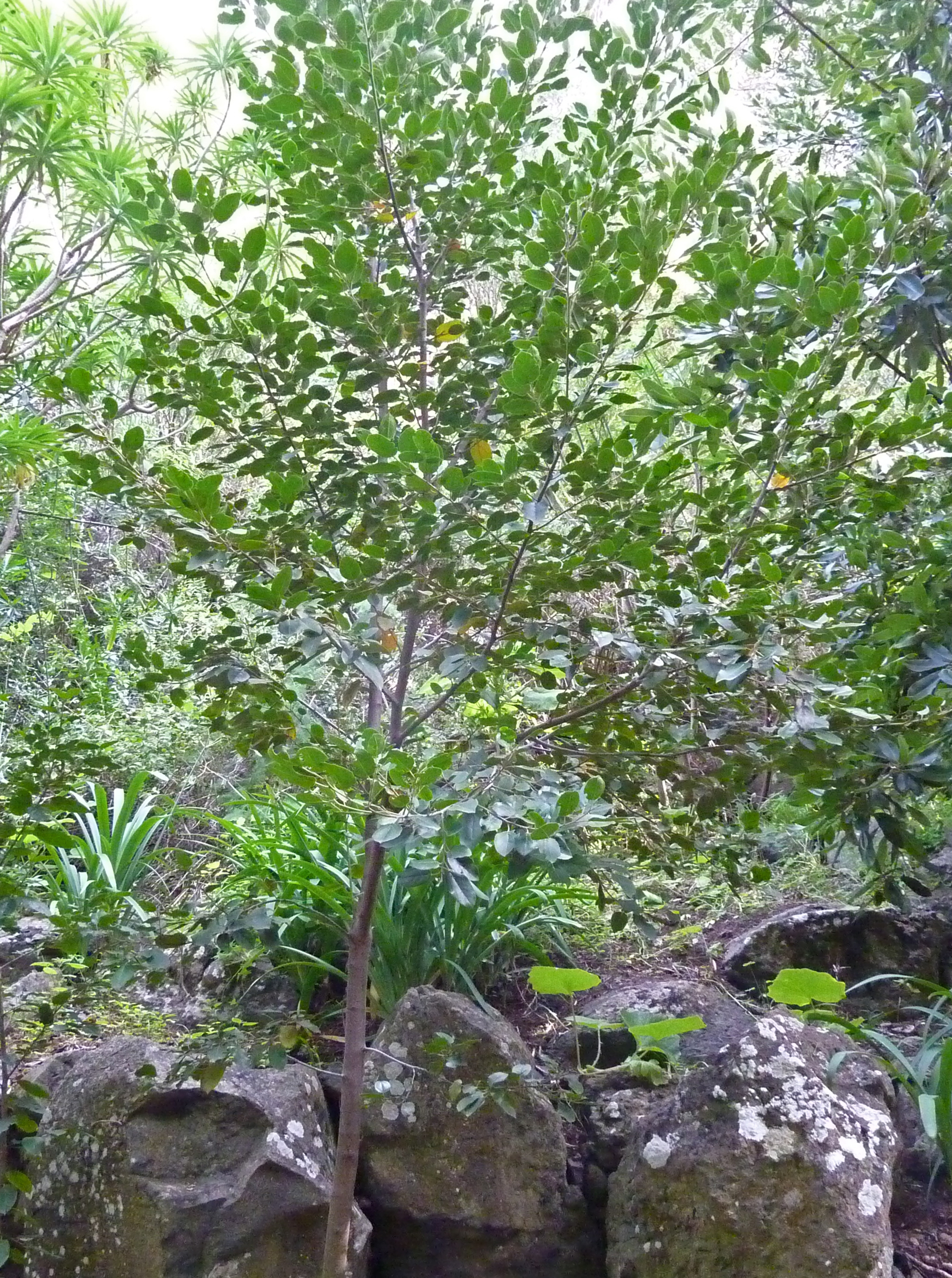

Conservation status
- Least Concern (IUCN 3.1)

Scientific classification
- Kingdom: Plantae
- Clade: Tracheophytes
- Clade: Angiosperms
- Clade: Eudicots
- Clade: Rosids
- Order: Rosales
- Family: Rhamnaceae
- Genus: Rhamnus
- Species: R. glandulosa

Binomial name
- Rhamnus glandulosa Aiton

Synonyms
- Alaternus glandulosus (Ait.) Rafin.

= Rhamnus glandulosa =

Species of flowering plant

Rhamnus glandulosa is a species of plant in the family Rhamnaceae. It is endemic to Madeira and the Canary Islands.

== Description ==
Rhamnus glandulosa is a small tree usually 5 to 8 metres (16 to 26 ft) but can grow up to 10 metres (33 ft) tall in a good condition Laurisilva forest.

It has a gray trunk and leathery evergreen leaves sawn, with small glands in the axils of the veins. The flowers are yellow-green, arranged in clusters, and the fruit is a globose drupe, purple-black when ripe.

== Distribution ==
It is an endemic species of Madeira and the Canary Islands, characteristic of the laurel forest. It is an uncommon tree in Madeira and on the Canaries (where it's listed as Vulnerable) it is only present on Tenerife, La Palma, La Gomera and Gran Canaria and only commonly seen in Tenerife. On Madeira, it occurs on mid to high altitudes, especially next to rivers, in the Canaries, it is restricted to Laurisilva forests.

On Madeira it is threatened by invasive species, changing fire regimes in the forest, and increasing intensity of the fires.

== Gallery ==
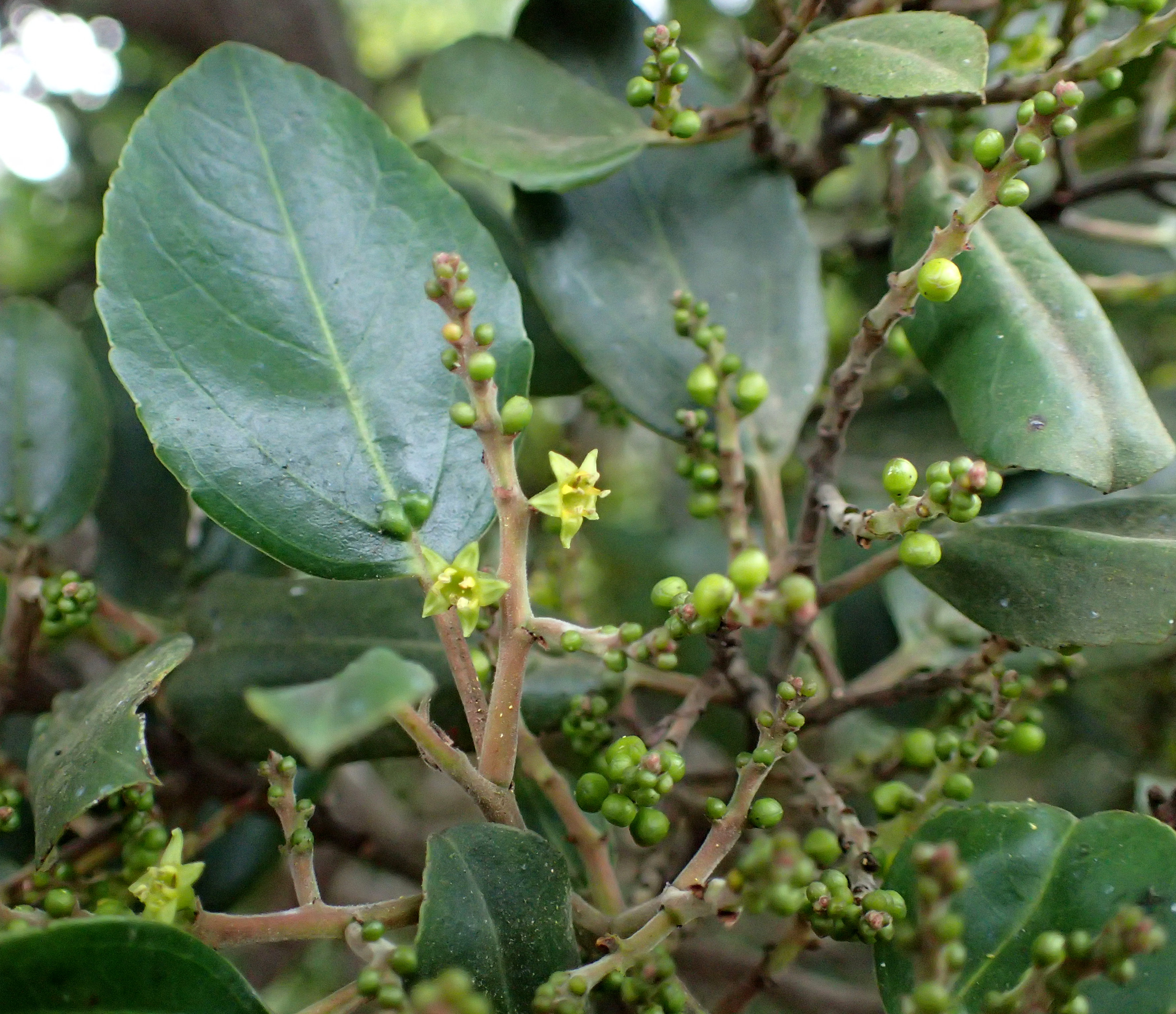
Flower and unripe fruit

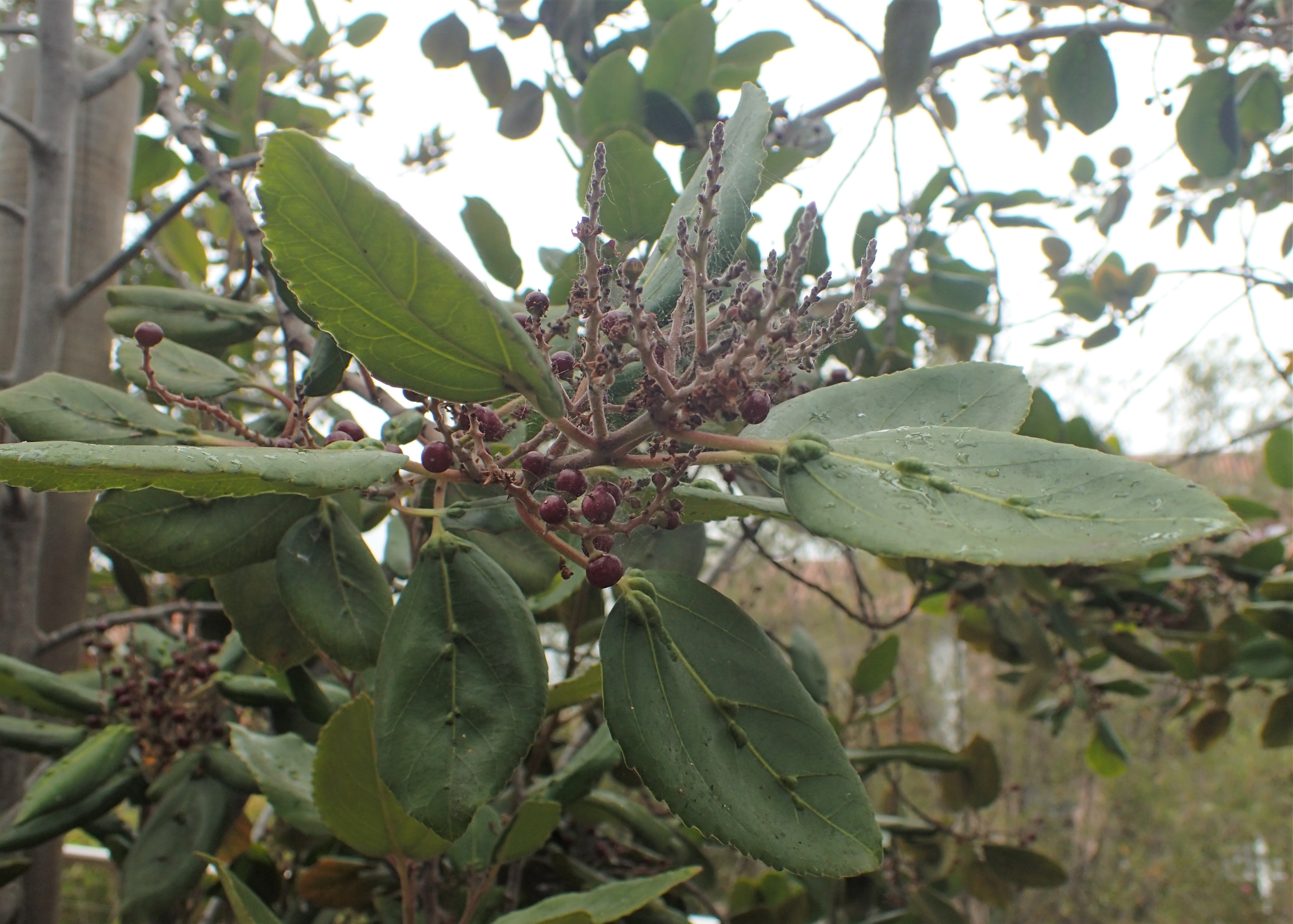
Ripe fruit
