= Rhamnus globosa =

Scientific classification
- Kingdom: Plantae
- Clade: Tracheophytes
- Clade: Angiosperms
- Clade: Eudicots
- Clade: Rosids
- Order: Rosales
- Family: Rhamnaceae
- Genus: Rhamnus
- Species: R. globosa

Binomial name
- Rhamnus globosa Bunge

Species of flowering plant

Rhamnus globosa, the lokao, is a species of plant in the family Rhamnaceae.
