= Persian berry =

Persian berry, also called Avignon berry or French berry, is the fruit of the Avignon buckthorn (Rhamnus saxatilis), a species of buckthorn, used for dyeing yellow (see Pinke).
