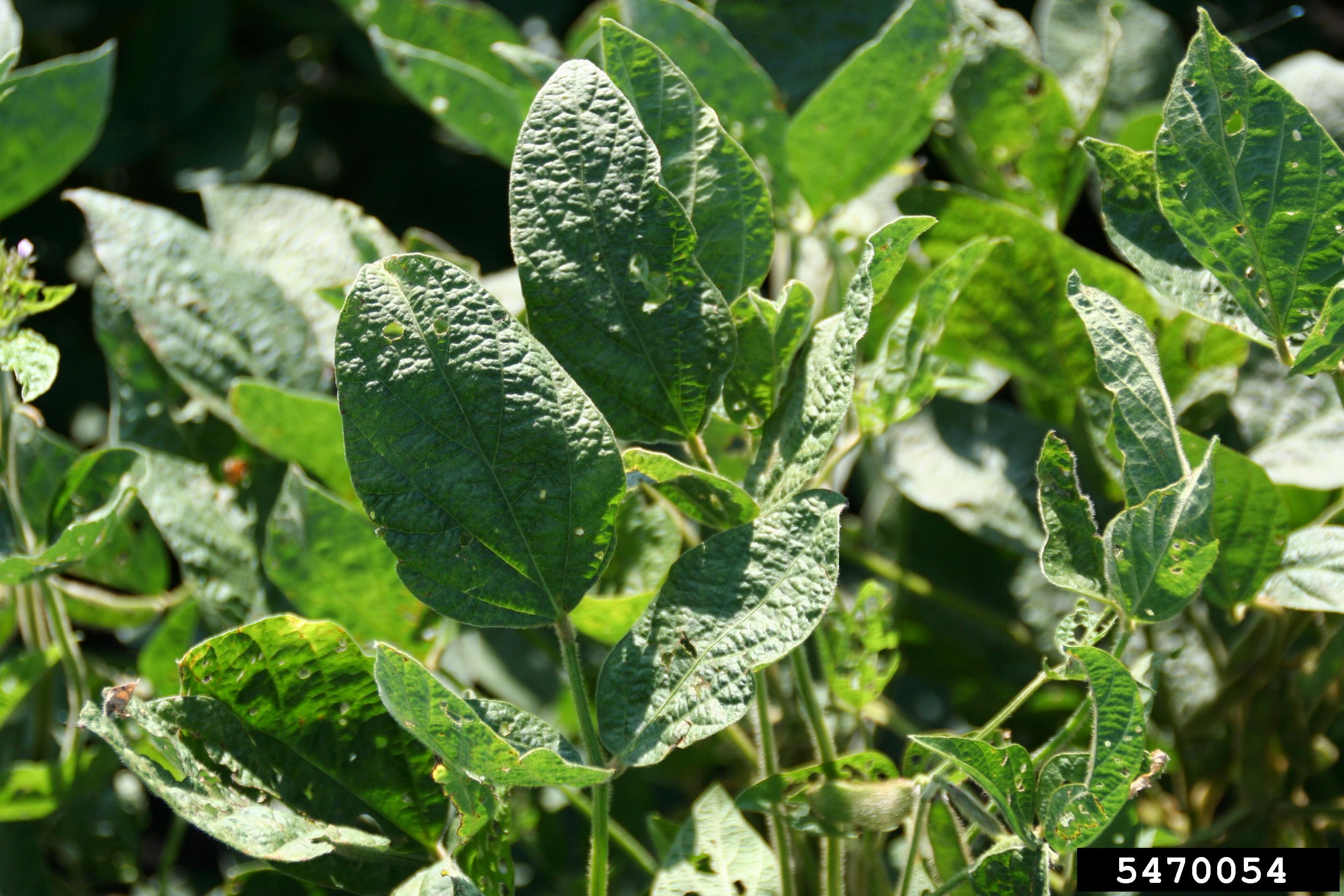
- Symptoms of soybean mosaic virus infection in soybean (Glycine max)

Virus classification
- (unranked): Virus
- Realm: Riboviria
- Kingdom: Orthornavirae
- Phylum: Pisuviricota
- Class: Stelpaviricetes
- Order: Patatavirales
- Family: Potyviridae
- Genus: Potyvirus
- Species: Potyvirus glycitessellati

= Soybean mosaic virus =

Plant disease

Soybean mosaic virus (SMV) is a member of the plant virus genus Potyvirus (family Potyviridae). It infects mainly plants belonging to the family Fabaceae but has also been found infecting other economically important crops. (Note: p. 365, "The most economically important host is soybean. Plant hosts infected by various virus isolates of SMV are limited to six plant families, which include members of the Fabaceae, Amaranthaceae, Chenopodiaceae, Passifloraceae, Schrophulariaceae, and Solanaceae. Numerous hosts differ in susceptibility based upon strain differences. Latent infection has been reported in several hosts.") SMV is the cause of soybean mosaic disease that occurs in all the soybean production areas of the world. Soybean (Glycine max) is one of the most important sources of edible oil and proteins and pathogenic infections are responsible for annual yield losses of about $4 billion in the United States. Among these pathogens, SMV is the most important and prevalent viral pathogen in soybean production worldwide. It causes yield reductions of about 8% to 35%, but losses as high as 94% have been reported. (Note: p. 355–390)

The virus was first reported from Connecticut in 1915 and described in 1921. Its genome is a single stranded positive sense RNA of about 9.5kb that encodes at least 11 proteins. SMV virion is non enveloped, flexuous and filamentous of about 720–800 nm long and 12–15 nm in diameter. Several strains of the SMV have been fully sequenced, consisting of 9,588 nucleotides (the sequenced data can be found on GenBank).

== Host and symptoms ==
In terms of economic damage, soybean is the most important host plant for SMV. However, plants belonging to the families Fabaceae/Leguminosae (including G. max, Strongylodon macrobotrys and others), Amaranthaceae (Chenopodiaceae), Passifloraceae, Scrophulariaceae, Cucurbitaceae, Solanaceae, and Caricaceae have also been reported infected with SMV. Fabaceae has been shown to have the largest number of genera infected by SMV. Hosts differ in susceptibility depending on the viral strain and latent infection has been reported in several hosts. Based on virulence, SMV has seven strain groupings in the United States (G1–G7) while in China there are 22 strain groups (SC1–SC22).

Symptoms are usually more obvious on young, rapidly growing leaves and are variable depending on the host genotype, virus strain, plant age at the moment of infection and the environment. Leaves are the tissue where the viral infection is localized and where the infection starts. Macroscopic symptoms can range from apparently asymptomatic plants to severely mottled and deformed leaves. Most of the infected cultivars become slightly stunted and show fewer pods that are sometimes dwarfed and flattened, without hairs and seeds. Trifoliate leaves show distinct mosaic and mottling symptoms with light and dark green areas that later can become raised or blistered along the main veins. Chlorosis has also been reported as a symptom of SMV infection especially between the dark green areas. Leaves can appear curly or waved and some cultivars show necrotic local lesions that can later merge into veinal necrosis followed by yellowing and leaf abscission. Some strains can cause severe stunting, systemic necrosis, leaf yellowing, petiole and stem necrosis, terminal necrosis and defoliation leading to the death of the plant due to systemic spread of the viral infection.

Seeds can also show symptoms of viral infection with SMV showing a brown or black mottle that is thought to be associated with suppression of posttranscriptional gene silencing of chalcone synthase by a silencing suppressor protein encoded by SMV. Germination and size of the seeds is considerably reduced as compared with healthy plants' seeds. Mottling does not indicate that the virus is present in seeds as not all mottled seeds contain virus and not all seeds from virus infected plants are mottled.

Symptoms are sometimes hard to differentiate when temperatures are above 30 °C (86 °F) and can also be confused with growth regulator herbicide damage where the leaves elongate. Rugosity is most severe in plants grown in temperatures of around 18 °C (64 °F), while general symptoms are less severe at 24–25 °C (75–77 °F). Temperature also influences the incubation period and the time between infection and symptom appearance, that ranges from 4 days at 29.5 °C (85 °F) to 14 days at 18.5 °C (65 °F). Additionally, SMV appears to have a synergistic interaction with Bean Pod Mottle Virus (BPMV) as plants infected with both viruses show drastically more severe symptoms than plants infected with only one virus. SMV and BPMV also interact in a different way: Either one will predispose soy plants to Phomopsis spp. infection.

== Disease cycle ==
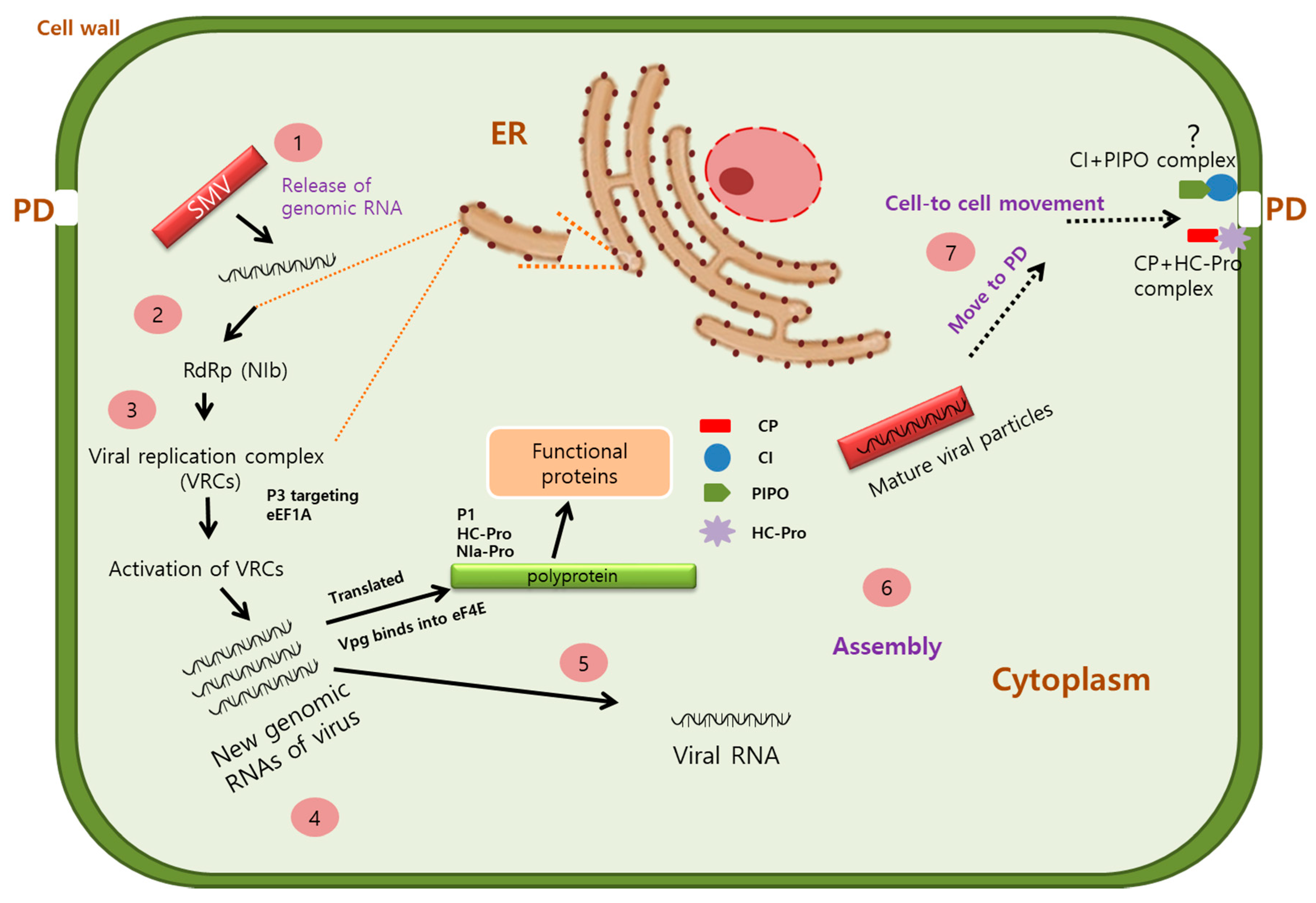
Replication and movement of soybean mosaic virus (SMV) within cell

The main transmission mechanism of SMV is through aphids. 32 aphid species from 15 different genera, have been shown to transmit SMV in a non-persistent manner, meaning the virus is passed through the aphid's stylet without being incorporated into the aphid's tissue. The most important species in terms of efficient transmission include Acyrthosiphon pisum, Aphis fabae, A. glycines, Myzus persicae and Rhopalosiphum maidis. Recently, the soybean aphid (A. glycines) was introduced into North America and because of its high transmission efficiency it has caused major concern. However, it has not been shown that the presence of the aphid along with the other migrating non-colonizing aphids that transmit SMV have significantly increased SMV incidence in the region.

SMV is easily transmitted mechanically when the plant is in direct contact with tools, humans or other plants. The virus moves systemically throughout the plant and can be detected in all tissues including the roots.

Transmission through seeds is also considerably important in SMV epidemiology as seeds are the source of primary inoculum with secondary spread by aphids occurring at relatively fast rate. Virus in seeds remains infective for a long period of time and viable virus can be recovered from seeds that no longer have germinating capacity. The transmission efficiency through seeds is dependent upon cultivar with incidence of seed transmission higher in plants infected before the onset of flowering. In the majority of commercial cultivars grown, seed transmission is less than 5% with ranges between no transmission and 75% transmission in older cultivars.

As mentioned before, early plant infection reduces pod sets, increases seed coat mottling and reduces seed size and weight, while late season infection has little effect on seed quality and yield. Additional effects of SMV include reduced oil content and nodulation. SMV also affects nitrogen fixation and can increase susceptibility to other pathogens.

== Time of occurrence ==
All season.

== Conditions favoring disease ==
Plants that are infected when young tend to show more symptoms than plants that are infected when older. Higher activity or populations of aphids' favor virus transmission.

== Disease management ==
The main management tools for avoiding yield reduction and severe damage of plants are preventive methods. The use of certified virus-free seeds and the timing of planting are crucial to avoid high vector populations when plants are still young. Infected seeds are the most important way that SMV is transmitted and serve as a primary source of infection for later dispersal by aphids. Late planting coincides with higher populations of aphids, which may increase the probability of virus transmission to young seedlings. Infection in the early growth stages has the highest impact in yield loss and seed quality compared to infection late in the life cycle. Serological and molecular techniques for screening viral presence in seeds can be used for detection in seed lots.

Control of aphid vectors should be able to significantly decrease infection levels. However, no control methods for aphids have yet been successfully developed. Insecticides are not considered effective in reducing transmission of SMV by aphids as aphids present at spraying are killed, but the field is quickly recolonized by winged aphids and virus transmission resumes. Aphids that come into contact with the insecticide residues on the leaf surface are killed but are still capable of virus transmission prior to death. Growers shouldn't spray insecticide below the soybean threshold since using an insecticide will only suppress the vector but not the disease and may make the virus problem worse.

The most effective disease management should be based on using resistant varieties. At least three naturally occurring independent loci (Rsv1, Rsv3 and Rsv4) have been identified and mapped for resistance to SMV. These three loci were specified to confer resistance against the SMV strains G1–G7. Loci specified in China to give resistance against SMV-SC strains are Rsc4, Rsc5, Rsc7, Rsc8, Rsc15, and Rsc20. Because of the high variability of SMV, use of single resistance genes is potentially dangerous and pyramiding available sources of resistance is recommended to achieve disease control.

== See also ==
- Soybean crinkle leaf virus
