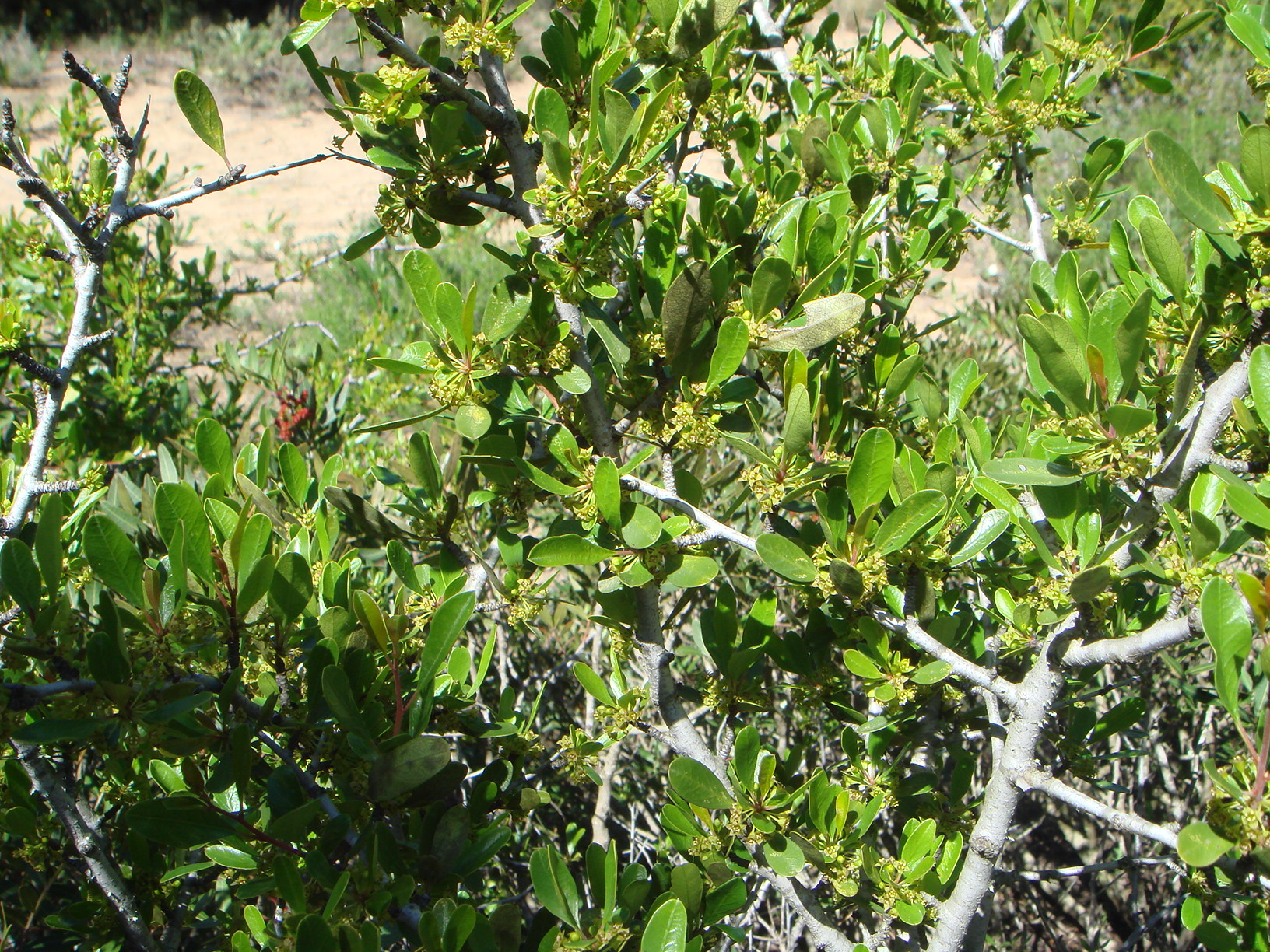

Scientific classification
- Kingdom: Plantae
- Clade: Tracheophytes
- Clade: Angiosperms
- Clade: Eudicots
- Clade: Rosids
- Order: Rosales
- Family: Rhamnaceae
- Genus: Rhamnus
- Species: R. oleoides

Binomial name
- Rhamnus oleoides L.

Synonyms
- Rhamnus lycioides subsp. oleoides (L.) Jahand. & Maire; Rhamnus lycioides var. oleoides (L.) Pau

= Rhamnus oleoides =

Olive Buckthorn

Species of plant

Rhamnus oleoides, known as the olive buckthorn, is a species of flowering plant in the family Rhamnaceae, native from the Mediterranean to the Arabian Peninsula and Iran.

== Taxonomy ==
Rhamnus oleoides was first described by Carl Linnaeus in 1762.

=== Subspecies ===
As of October 2024, Plants of the World Online accepted the following subspecies:

- Rhamnus oleoides subsp. assoana Rivas Mart. & J.M.Pizarro – Spain
- Rhamnus oleoides subsp. bourgaeana (Gand.) Rivas Mart. & J.M.Pizarro (synonym Rhamnus bourgaeana Gand.) – Balearic Islands
- Rhamnus oleoides subsp. oleoides – Mediterranean to Iran and Saudi Arabia
- Rhamnus oleoides subsp. rivasgodayana Rivas Mart. & J.M.Pizarro – eastern and southeastern Spain

== Distribution ==
Rhamnus oleoides is native to the Mediterranean basin (Algeria, the Balearic Islands, Crete, the East Aegean Islands, Egypt, France, Greece, Libya, Morocco, Portugal, Sardinia, Sicily, Spain, and Tunisia) and eastwards to Turkey, Saudi Arabia and Iran.

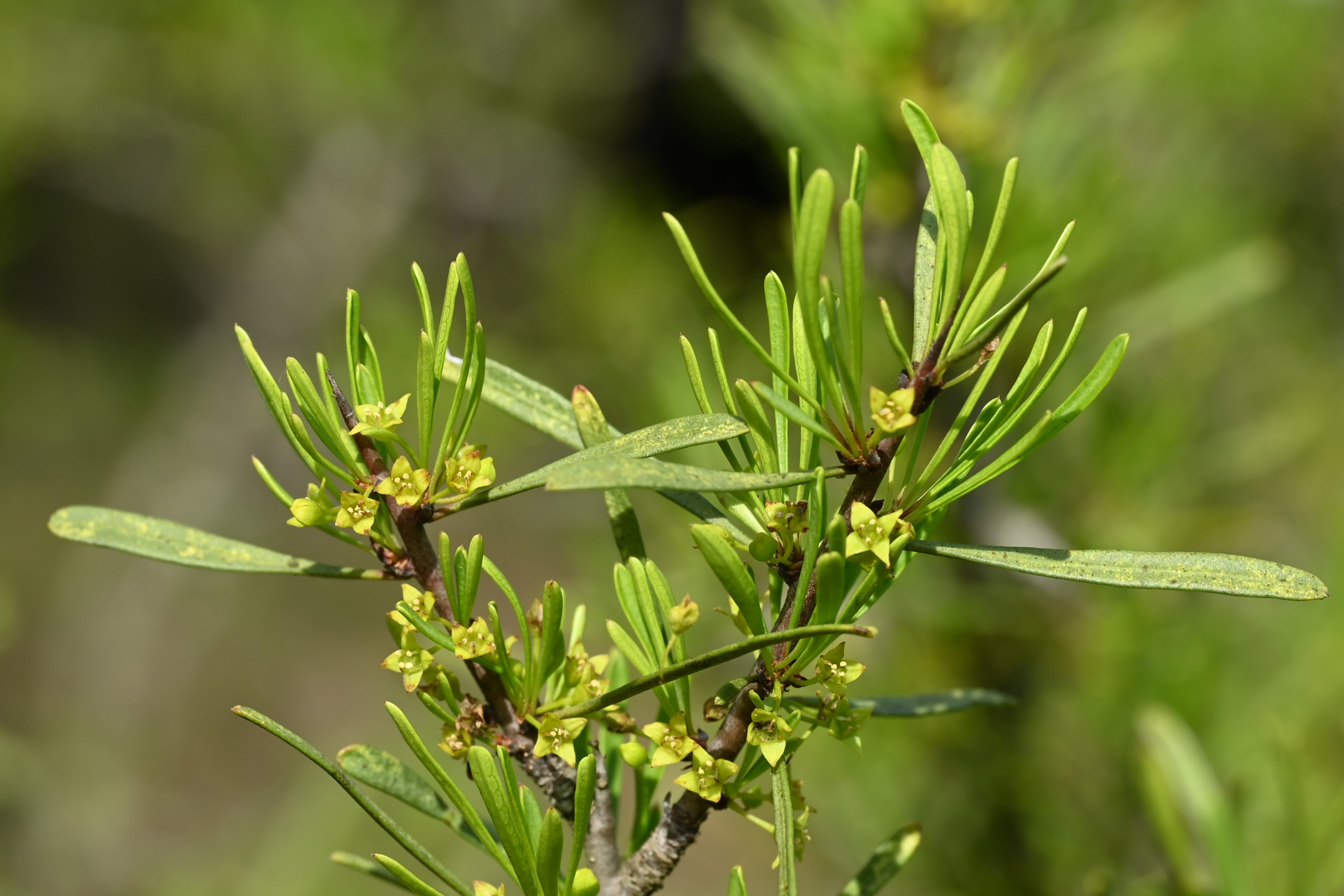
Flowering branch

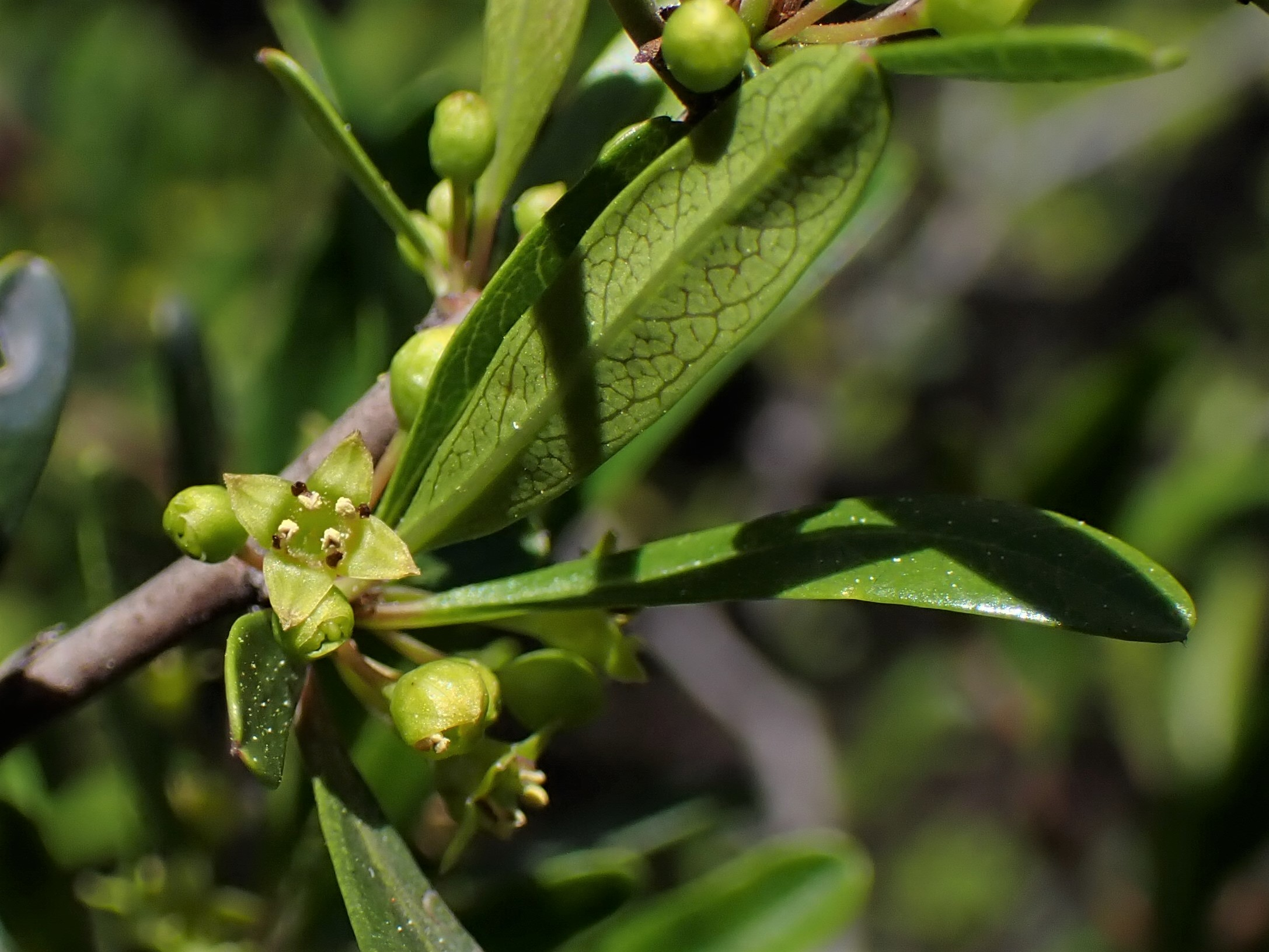
Flower
