= Rhamnus lojaconoi =

Conservation status
- Critically Endangered (IUCN 3.1)

Scientific classification
- Kingdom: Plantae
- Clade: Tracheophytes
- Clade: Angiosperms
- Clade: Eudicots
- Clade: Rosids
- Order: Rosales
- Family: Rhamnaceae
- Genus: Rhamnus
- Species: R. lojaconoi

Binomial name
- Rhamnus lojaconoi Raimondo

Genus of flowering plants

Rhamnus lojaconoi is a species of flowering plant in the family Rhamnaceae. It is a shrub or tree endemic to Sicily, where it is known locally as ranno di Lojacono. It grows to 8 to 10 meters tall.

Rhamnus lojaconoi grows in remnant evergreen laurel forests in ravines on the northern slopes of the Madonie massif between 300 and 560 meters elevation, where the exposure and topography allow more year-round moisture. Laurel (Laurus nobilis) is the dominant tree, together with Quercus ilex and Quercus pubescens subsp. pubescens, forming low thickets 6 to 12 meters tall, with a relatively open canopy with 50–80% coverage. Rhamnus lojaconoi grows in the relatively shady, cool, and humid forest understory with Woodwardia radicans, Pteris vittata, and several rare, endemic, and limited-range species.

There is a single known population of the species in Madonie Regional Natural Park with fewer than 50 individual plants. The species is assessed as critically endangered by the IUCN.
