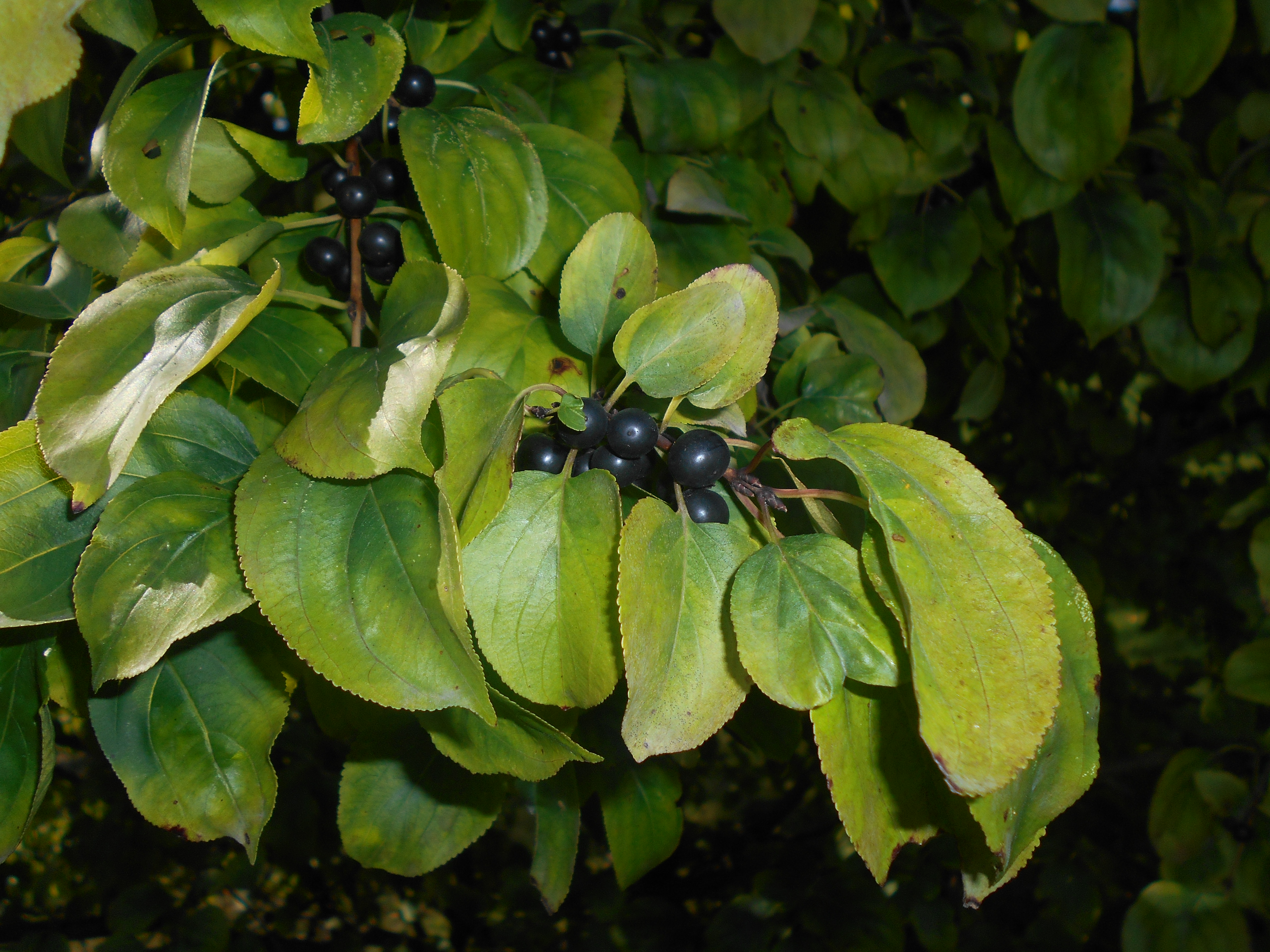

Conservation status
- Least Concern (IUCN 3.1)

Scientific classification
- Kingdom: Plantae
- Clade: Tracheophytes
- Clade: Angiosperms
- Clade: Eudicots
- Clade: Rosids
- Order: Rosales
- Family: Rhamnaceae
- Genus: Rhamnus
- Species: R. davurica

Binomial name
- Rhamnus davurica Pall.

Varieties
- Rhamnus davurica var. davurica; Rhamnus davurica var. nipponica Makino

Synonyms
- Synonymy: Rhamnus cathartica var. davurica (Pall.) Maxim. synonyms of var. davurica: Cornus citrifolia Weston; Rhamnus citrifolia (Weston) W.J.Hess & Stearn, nom. illeg. homonym. post.; Rhamnus davurica var. japonica Makino ex Nakai; Rhamnus parvifolia Turcz., nom. illeg. homonym. post.; Rhamnus sinensis Ser. ex Rondot; Verlangia sicula Neck. ex Raf. synonyms of var. nipponica: Frangula crenata var. stenophylla (Koidz.) Honda; Rhamnus citrifolia var. nipponica (Makino) W.J.Hess & Stearn; Rhamnus crenata var. stenophylla Koidz.; Rhamnus davurica subsp. nipponica (Makino) J.T.Kartesz & Gandhi; Rhamnus davurica f. pubescens H.Hara; Rhamnus nipponica (Makino) Grubov

= Rhamnus davurica =

Species of flowering plant

Rhamnus davurica is a species of flowering plant in the buckthorn family known by the common name Dahurian buckthorn. It is native to China, Korea, Mongolia, eastern Siberia, and Japan. It is present in North America as an introduced species.

== Description ==
This plant is similar to common buckthorn, but the stems are more stout and the leaves are longer. In its native range it may be up to 10 meters tall. It may also reach up to 9 meters in cultivation. The oppositely arranged leaves are up to 13 centimeters long by 6 wide in its native range, and usually smaller where it is introduced. The male flowers are just under a centimeter long and the female flowers are slightly smaller. The fruit is a drupe containing two seeds.

In the United States this is an invasive species, growing in woodlands, forests, and other habitat types. In its native China it occurs in wet places, such as the edges of canals.
