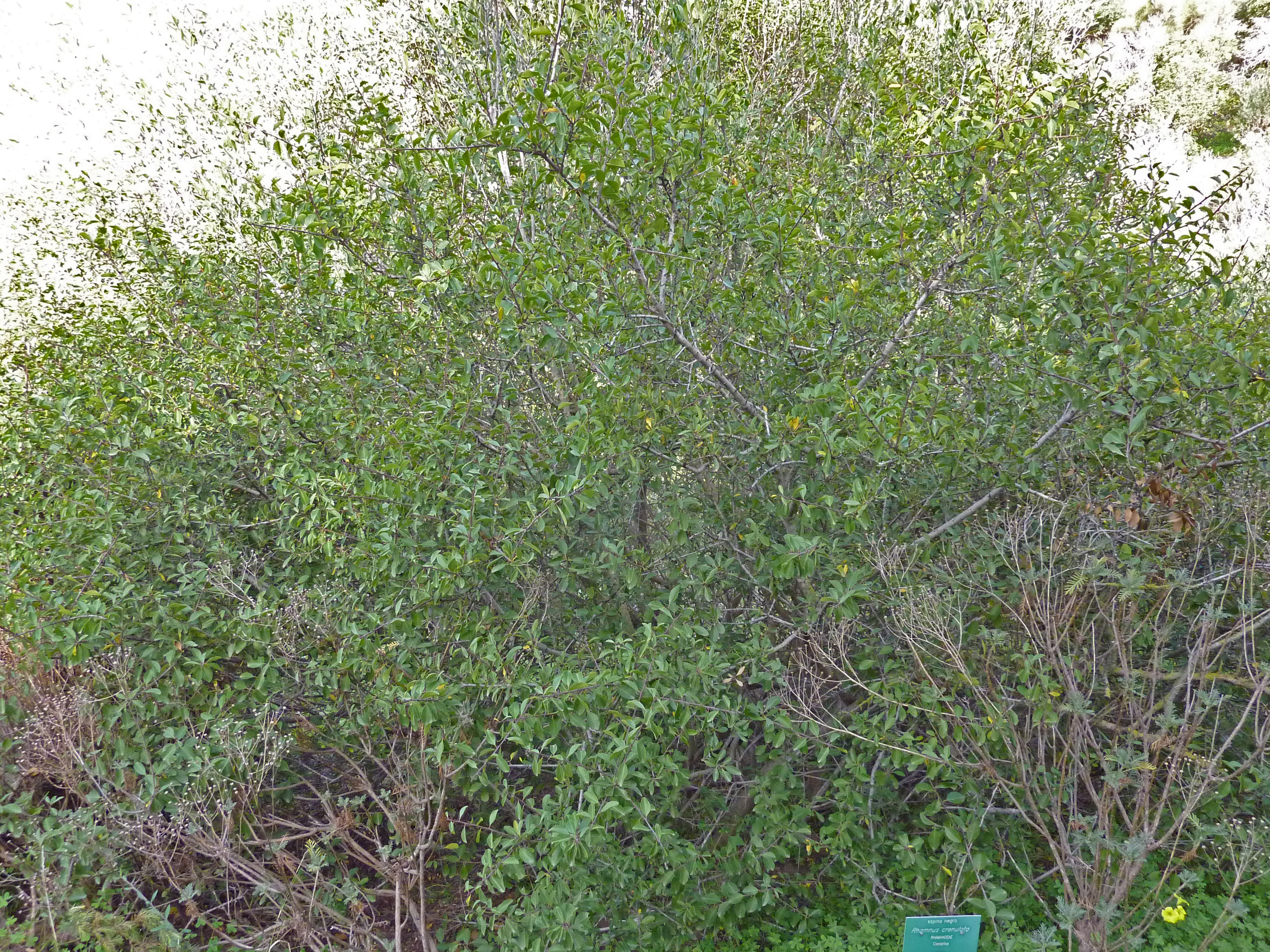

Conservation status
- Least Concern (IUCN 3.1)

Scientific classification
- Kingdom: Plantae
- Clade: Tracheophytes
- Clade: Angiosperms
- Clade: Eudicots
- Clade: Rosids
- Order: Rosales
- Family: Rhamnaceae
- Genus: Rhamnus
- Species: R. crenulata

Binomial name
- Rhamnus crenulata Aiton

= Rhamnus crenulata =

Species of flowering plant

Rhamnus crenulata is a species of plant in the family Rhamnaceae. It is endemic to the Canary Islands of Spain. It is threatened by Mediterranean Matorral shrubland habitat loss. In the Canary Islands it is also known as espinero and to the wider community as Canary Buckthorn.
