= Rhamnus serrata =

Scientific classification
- Kingdom: Plantae
- Clade: Tracheophytes
- Clade: Angiosperms
- Clade: Eudicots
- Clade: Rosids
- Order: Rosales
- Family: Rhamnaceae
- Genus: Rhamnus
- Species: R. serrata

Binomial name
- Rhamnus serrata Humb. & Bonpl. ex Schult.

Species of shrub

Rhamnus serrata, the sawleaf buckthorn, is a species of plant in the family Rhamnaceae. The shrub is native to Arizona, New Mexico, eastern northern Mexico, and Texas.
