= Rhamnus arguta =

Scientific classification
- Kingdom: Plantae
- Clade: Tracheophytes
- Clade: Angiosperms
- Clade: Eudicots
- Clade: Rosids
- Order: Rosales
- Family: Rhamnaceae
- Genus: Rhamnus
- Species: R. arguta

Binomial name
- Rhamnus arguta Maxim.

Species of flowering plant

Rhamnus arguta, the sharp-tooth buckthorn, is a plant which has become naturalized in Indiana, USA.
