= Rhamnus persica =

Scientific classification
- Kingdom: Plantae
- Clade: Embryophytes
- Clade: Tracheophytes
- Clade: Spermatophytes
- Clade: Angiosperms
- Clade: Eudicots
- Clade: Rosids
- Order: Rosales
- Family: Rhamnaceae
- Genus: Rhamnus
- Species: R. persica

Binomial name
- Rhamnus persica Boiss.

Species of flowering plant

Rhamnus persica is a species of plant in the family Rhamnaceae.
