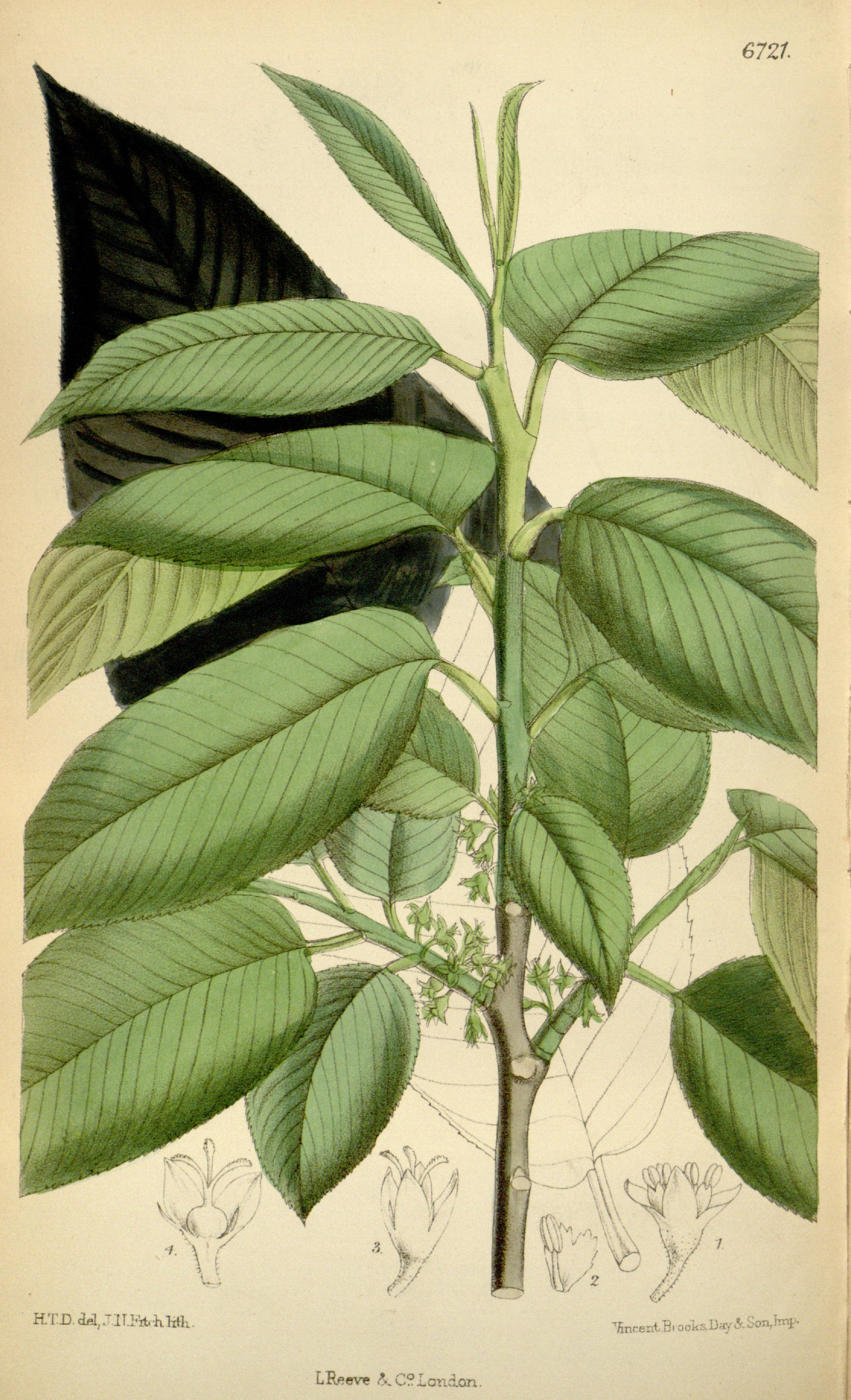
- Lebanese buckthorn

Scientific classification
- Kingdom: Plantae
- Clade: Embryophytes
- Clade: Tracheophytes
- Clade: Angiosperms
- Clade: Eudicots
- Clade: Rosids
- Order: Rosales
- Family: Rhamnaceae
- Genus: Rhamnus
- Species: R. libanotica

Binomial name
- Rhamnus libanotica Boiss.

Synonyms
- Atadinus libanoticus (Boiss.) Hauenschild; Oreoherzogia libanotica (Boiss.) W.Vent; Oreoherzogia taurica W.Vent; Rhamnus castaneifolia Lebas

= Rhamnus libanotica =

Species of flowering plant

Rhamnus libanotica is a species of flowering plant in the Rhamnaceae family. It is referred to by the common name Lebanese buckthorn, and is native to Western Asia from Lebanon and Syria to Turkey.
