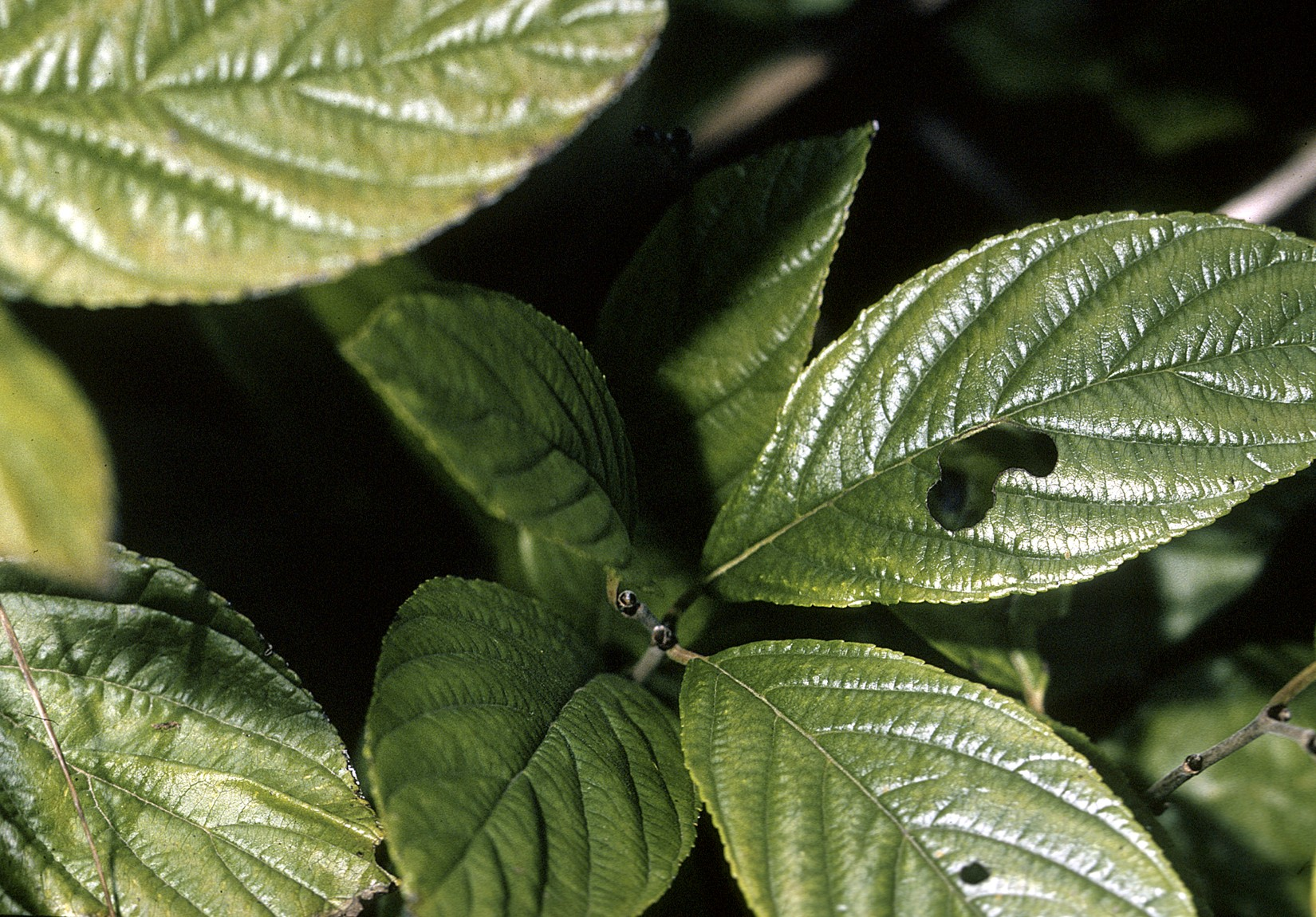

Scientific classification
- Kingdom: Plantae
- Clade: Embryophytes
- Clade: Tracheophytes
- Clade: Spermatophytes
- Clade: Angiosperms
- Clade: Eudicots
- Clade: Rosids
- Order: Rosales
- Family: Rhamnaceae
- Genus: Rhamnus
- Species: R. alnifolia

Binomial name
- Rhamnus alnifolia L'Hér.

Synonyms
- List: Apetlothamnus alnifolia (L'Hér.) Nieuwl.; Endotropis alnifolia (L'Hér.); Girtanneria alnifolia (L'Hér.) Raf.; Ventia alnifolia (L'Hér.); Frangula americana Mill.; Girtanneria franguloides (Michx.) Raf.; Rhamnus alnifolia f. angustifolia D.Löve & J.-P.Bernard; Rhamnus alpina Richardson; Rhamnus franguloides Michx.

= Rhamnus alnifolia =

Species of flowering plant

Rhamnus alnifolia is a species of flowering plant in the buckthorn family known by the common names alderleaf buckthorn, or alder buckthorn. Unlike other "buckthorns", this alder buckthorn does not have thorns. It is native to North America, and can be found in forested habitat.

== Description ==
Rhamnus alnifolia is a spreading shrub usually 0.5 to 1.5 metres (20 to 59 inches) tall, rarely to 2 m (6 1/2 ft), its thin branches bearing deciduous leaves. The thin, deeply veined leaves have oval blades 4.5 to 11 centimetres (1 3/4 to 4 3/8 in) long, pointed at the tip and lightly toothed along the edges. The inflorescence is a solitary flower or umbel of up to three flowers occurring in leaf axils. The tiny flowers are about 1 millimetre (1/16 in) wide and have five green sepals but no petals. Female flowers produce drupes 6 to 8 mm (1/4 to 5/16 in) wide, each containing three seeds. The drupes darken to black when ripe.

== Distribution and habitat ==
It can be found in the southern half of Canada and the northern half of the United States, mostly in the Pacific Northwest. It grows in streambanks and on humid flats near mountains.

== Uses ==
The berry is inedible. Native Americans used the species as a laxative.
