= Rhamnus orbiculata =

Scientific classification
- Kingdom: Plantae
- Clade: Embryophytes
- Clade: Tracheophytes
- Clade: Angiosperms
- Clade: Eudicots
- Clade: Rosids
- Order: Rosales
- Family: Rhamnaceae
- Genus: Rhamnus
- Species: R. orbiculata

Binomial name
- Rhamnus orbiculata Bornm.

Synonyms
- Rhamnus sagorskii Bornm.

Species of flowering plant

Rhamnus orbiculata is a species of plant in the buckthorn family. It has simple leaves, and is mostly found in Europe and the Middle East. It was first described by Joseph Friedrich Nicolaus Bornmüller in 1887.
