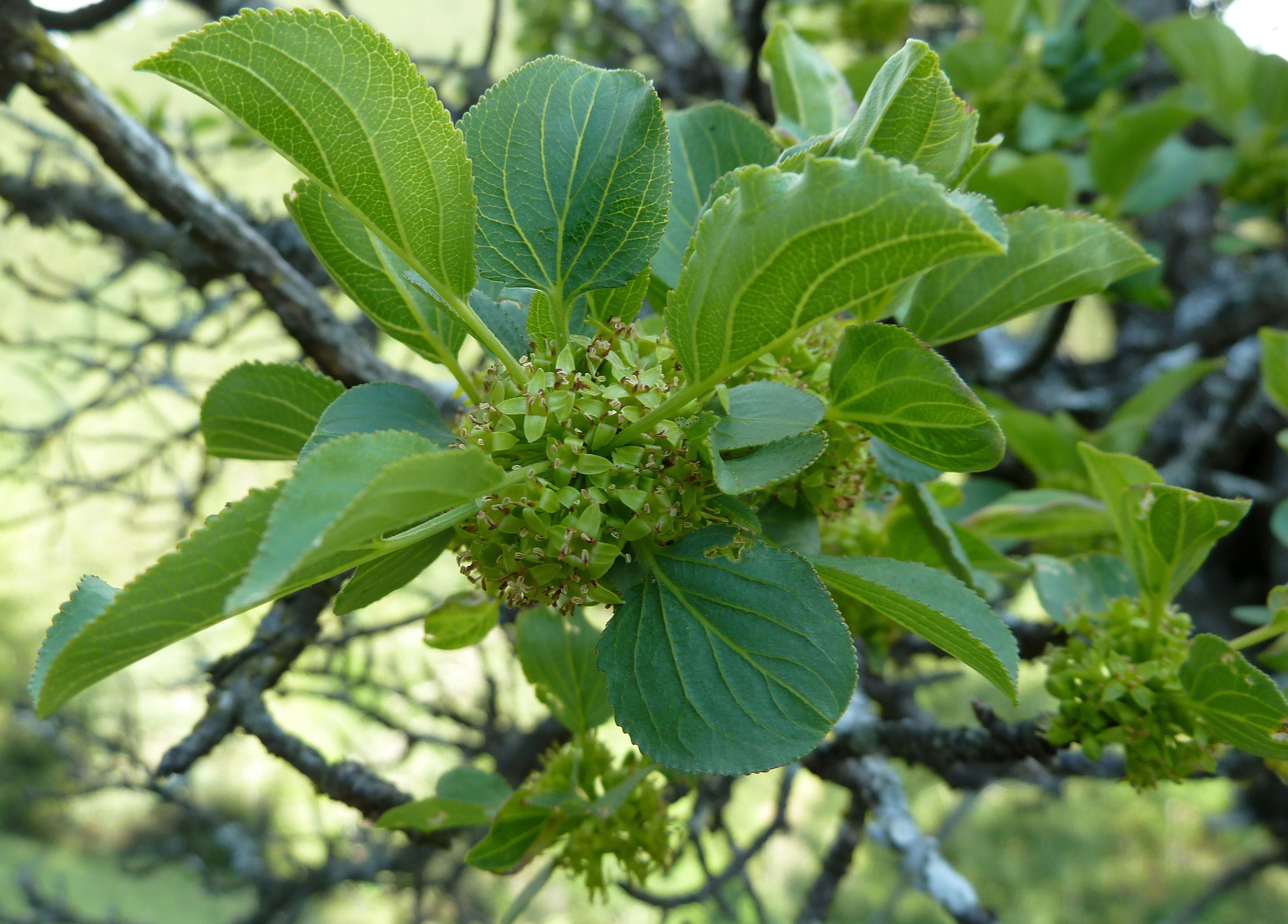
- Rhamnus cathartica

Scientific classification
- Kingdom: Plantae
- Clade: Tracheophytes
- Clade: Angiosperms
- Clade: Eudicots
- Clade: Rosids
- Order: Rosales
- Family: Rhamnaceae
- Tribe: Rhamneae
- Genus: Rhamnus; L.

Species
- See text

= Rhamnus (plant) =

Genus of flowering plants in the buckthorn family

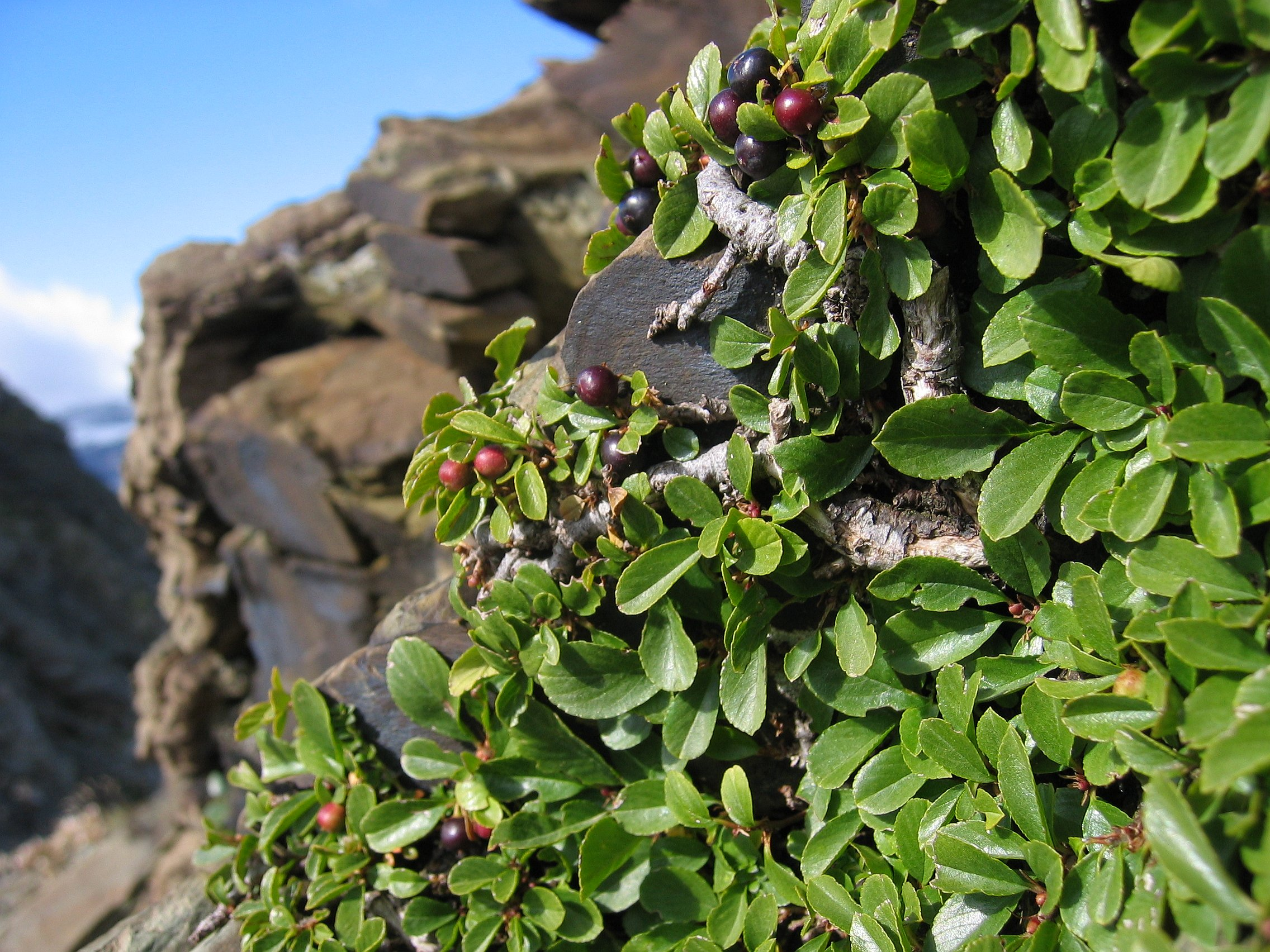
Rhamnus pumila, dwarf buckthorn

Rhamnus is a genus of about 140 accepted species of shrubs or small trees, commonly known as buckthorns, in the family Rhamnaceae. Its species range from 1 to 10 m (3 to 33 ft) tall (rarely to 15 m, 50 ft) and are native mainly in East Asia and North America, but found throughout the temperate and subtropical Northern Hemisphere, and also more locally in the subtropical Southern Hemisphere in parts of Africa and South America.

Both deciduous and evergreen species occur. The leaves are simple, 3 to 15 cm (1 to 6 in) long, and arranged alternately, in opposite pairs, or almost paired (subopposite). One distinctive character of many buckthorns is the way the veination curves upward towards the tip of the leaf. The plant bears fruits which are black or red berry-like drupes. The name is due to the woody spine on the end of each twig in many species. One species is known to have potential to be used medicinally.

== Description ==
Rhamnus species are shrubs or small to medium-sized trees, with deciduous or rarely evergreen foliage. Branches are unarmed or end in a woody spine. The leaf blades are undivided and pinnately veined. Leaf margins are serrate or rarely entire. Rhamnus species are generally dioecious, with male and female flowers on separate plants. Most species have yellowish green, small, unisexual or rarely polygamous flowers; which are produced singly or in axillary cymes, cymose racemes, or cymose panicles containing a few flowers. Calyx tube campanulate to cup-shaped, with 4 or 5 ovate-triangular sepals, which are adaxially ± distinctly keeled. Petals 4 or 5 but a few species may lack petals. The petals are shorter than the sepals. Flowers have 4 or 5 stamens which are surrounded by and equal in length the petals or are shorter. The anthers are dorsifixed. The superior ovary is free, rounded, with 2–4 chambers. Fruits are a 2–4 stoned, berrylike drupe, which is obovoid-globose or globose shaped. Seeds are obovoid or oblong-obovoid shaped, unfurrowed or abaxially or laterally margined with a long, narrow, furrow. The seeds have fleshy endosperm.

== Species ==
As of October 2024, Plants of the World Online accepted the following species:

- Rhamnus alaternus L. – Italian buckthorn
- Rhamnus alnifolia L'Hér. – alderleaf buckthorn, alder-leaved buckthorn
- Rhamnus alpina L.
- Rhamnus arguta Maxim. – sharp-tooth buckthorn
- Rhamnus arnottiana Gardner ex Thwaites
- Rhamnus aurea Heppeler
- Rhamnus baldschuanica Grubov
- Rhamnus × bermejoi P.Fraga & Rosselló
- Rhamnus biglandulosa Sessé & Moc.
- Rhamnus bodinieri H.Lév.
- Rhamnus brachypoda C.Y.Wu
- Rhamnus bungeana J.J.Vassil.
- Rhamnus calderoniae R.Fern.
- Rhamnus cathartica L. – common buckthorn, purging buckthorn (orth. var. R. catharticus)
- Rhamnus collettii Bhandari & Bhansali
- Rhamnus cordata Medw.
- Rhamnus coriophylla Hand.-Mazz.
- Rhamnus cornifolia Boiss. & Hohen.
- Rhamnus costata Maxim.
- Rhamnus crenulata Aiton
- Rhamnus crocea Nutt. – redberry buckthorn (subsp. crocea), hollyleaf buckthorn (subsp. pilosa)
  - Rhamnus crocea subsp. ilicifolia (Kellogg) C.B.Wolf – synonym Rhamnus ilicifolia
- Rhamnus dalianensis S.Y.Li & Z.H.Ning
- Rhamnus daliensis G.S.Fan & L.L.Deng
- Rhamnus darii Govaerts
- Rhamnus davurica Pall. – Dahurian buckthorn
- Rhamnus depressa Grubov
- Rhamnus diffusa Clos
- Rhamnus disperma Ehrenb. ex Boiss.
- Rhamnus dolichophylla Gontsch.
- Rhamnus dumetorum C.K.Schneid.
- Rhamnus erythroxyloides Hoffmanns.
- Rhamnus erythroxylum Pall.
- Rhamnus esquirolii H.Lév.
- Rhamnus fallax Boiss.
- Rhamnus flavescens Y.L.Chen & P.K.Chou
- Rhamnus formosana Matsum.
- Rhamnus fulvotincta F.P.Metcalf
- Rhamnus × gayeri Kárpáti ex Soó
- Rhamnus gilgiana Heppeler
- Rhamnus glandulosa Aiton
- Rhamnus glaucophylla Sommier
- Rhamnus globosa Bunge – Lokao buckthorn
- Rhamnus grandiflora C.Y.Wu
- Rhamnus grubovii I.M.Turner
- Rhamnus hainanensis Merr. & Chun
- Rhamnus hemsleyana C.K.Schneid.
- Rhamnus heterophylla Oliv.
- Rhamnus hirtella Boiss.
- Rhamnus hupehensis C.K.Schneid.
- Rhamnus × hybrida L'Hér.
- Rhamnus imeretina J.R.Booth ex G.Kirchn.
- Rhamnus infectoria L.
- Rhamnus integrifolia DC. – moralito
- Rhamnus × intermedia Steud. & Hochst.
- Rhamnus ishidae Miyabe & Kudô
- Rhamnus iteinophylla C.K.Schneid.
- Rhamnus japonica Maxim. – Japanese buckthorn
- Rhamnus kanagusukii Makino
- Rhamnus kayacikii Yalt. & P.H.Davis
- Rhamnus kurdica Boiss. & Hohen.
- Rhamnus kwangsiensis Y.L.Chen & P.K.Chou
- Rhamnus lamprophylla C.K.Schneid.
- Rhamnus lanceolata Pursh – lanceleaf buckthorn
- Rhamnus laoshanensis D.K.Zang
- Rhamnus ledermannii Lauterb.
- Rhamnus × lemaniana Briq.
- Rhamnus leptacantha C.K.Schneid.
- Rhamnus leptophylla C.K.Schneid.
- Rhamnus libanotica Boiss. – Lebanese buckthorn
- Rhamnus liboensis Y.F.Deng
- Rhamnus liukiuensis (E.H.Wilson) Koidz.
- Rhamnus lojaconoi Raimondo
- Rhamnus ludovici-salvatoris Chodat – endemic to Mallorca
- Rhamnus lycioides L. – black hawthorn, European buckthorn, or Mediterranean buckthorn
- Rhamnus maximovicziana J.J.Vassil.
- Rhamnus × mehreganii Alijanpoor & Khodayari
- Rhamnus × mercieri Briq.
- Rhamnus microcarpa Boiss.
- Rhamnus mildbraedii Engl.
- Rhamnus minnanensis K.M.Li
- Rhamnus mollis Merr.
- Rhamnus mongolica Y.Z.Zhao & L.Q.Zhao
- Rhamnus × mulleyana Fritsch
- Rhamnus myrtifolia Willk.
- Rhamnus nakaharae (Hayata) Hayata
- Rhamnus napalensis (Wall.) M.A.Lawson
- Rhamnus nigrescens Lauterb.
- Rhamnus nigricans Hand.-Mazz.
- Rhamnus ninglangensis Y.L.Chen
- Rhamnus nitida P.H.Davis
- Rhamnus oleoides L.
- Rhamnus orbiculata Bornm. – Orjen buckthorn
- Rhamnus papuana Lauterb.
- Rhamnus parvifolia Bunge
- Rhamnus pentapomica R.Parker
- Rhamnus persica Boiss. – Persian buckthorn (grows in Iran)
- Rhamnus persicifolia Moris
- Rhamnus petiolaris Boiss. & Balansa – (endemic to Sri Lanka)
- Rhamnus philippinensis C.B.Rob.
- Rhamnus pichleri C.K.Schneid. & Bornm.
- Rhamnus pilushanensis Y.C.Liu & C.M.Wang
- Rhamnus × pissjaukovae O.A.Popova
- Rhamnus prinoides L'Hér. – shiny-leaf buckthorn
- Rhamnus procumbens Edgew.
- Rhamnus prunifolia Sm.
- Rhamnus pulogensis Merr.
- Rhamnus pumila Turra
- Rhamnus punctata Boiss.
- Rhamnus purpurea Edgew.
- Rhamnus pyrella O.Schwarz
- Rhamnus qianweiensis Z.Y.Zhu
- Rhamnus rahiminejadii Alijanpoor & Assadi
- Rhamnus rhodopea Velen.
- Rhamnus rosei M.C.Johnst. & L.A.Johnst.
- Rhamnus rosthornii E.Pritz.
- Rhamnus rugulosa Hemsl.
- Rhamnus salixiophylla S.S.Ying
- Rhamnus sargentiana C.K.Schneid.
- Rhamnus saxatilis Jacq. – rock Buckthorn, Avignon buckthorn, Avignon berry, dyer's buckthorn (syn. R. infectoria, R. infectorius)
- Rhamnus schlechteri Lauterb.
- Rhamnus seravschanica (Kom.) Kamelin
- Rhamnus serpyllacea Greuter & Burdet
- Rhamnus serrata Humb. & Bonpl. ex Schult. – sawleaf buckthorn
- Rhamnus sibthorpiana Schult.
- Rhamnus smithii Greene – Smith's buckthorn
- Rhamnus songorica Gontsch.
- Rhamnus spathulifolia Fisch. & C.A.Mey.
- Rhamnus staddo A.Rich. – Staddo (syn. R. rhodesicus)
- Rhamnus standleyana C.B.Wolf
- Rhamnus subapetala Merr.
- Rhamnus sumatrensis Ridl.
- Rhamnus sumbawana Lauterb.
- Rhamnus tangutica J.J.Vassil.
- Rhamnus taquetii (H.Lév. & Vaniot) H.Lév. – Jejudo buckthorn
- Rhamnus thymifolia Bornm.
- Rhamnus tonkinensis Pit.
- Rhamnus tortuosa Sommier & Levier
- Rhamnus triquetra (Wall.) Brandis
- Rhamnus tzekweiensis Y.L.Chen & P.K.Chou
- Rhamnus utilis Decne. – Chinese buckthorn
- Rhamnus velutina Boiss.
- Rhamnus virgata Roxb.
- Rhamnus wightii Wight & Arn. – Wight's buckthorn
- Rhamnus wilsonii C.K.Schneid.
- Rhamnus × woloszczakii Kárpáti
- Rhamnus wumingensis Y.L.Chen & P.K.Chou
- Rhamnus xizangensis Y.L.Chen & P.K.Chou
- Rhamnus yoshinoi Makino

== Distribution ==
Rhamnus has a nearly cosmopolitan distribution, with about 140 species which are native from temperate to tropical regions, the majority of species are from east Asia and North America, with a few species in Europe and Africa.

North American species include Rhamnus alnifolia, alder-leaf buckthorn, occurring across the continent, and Rhamnus crocea, hollyleaf buckthorn, in the west. Though not native to this region, Rhamnus cathartica can be found in North America.

Buckthorns may be confused with dogwoods, which share the curved leaf venation; indeed, "dogwood" is a local name for R. prinoides in southern Africa. The two plants are easy to distinguish by slowly pulling a leaf apart; dogwoods will exude thin, white latex strings, while buckthorns will not.

== Invasive species ==
Rhamnus cathartica, the common buckthorn, is considered an invasive species in the United States and by many local jurisdictions and state governments, including Minnesota and Wisconsin.

The common buckthorn is well-adapted to spreading in Canada and the U.S. It is an efficient grower that does not need much sunlight and or fertile soil. Its seeds are hardy, as well as being able to grow and spread easily in a variety of environmental conditions. Also other animals prefer to leave buckthorns alone because their leaves are not appetizing and their fruits are toxic to some animals. Overall they are known to have a negative effect on their surrounding environment. For example, the European buckthorn is blamed for increased frog egg mortality from a chemical it releases. Other species, such as the Rhamnus alaternus also make chemicals that prevent other animals from consuming them.

Rhamnus alaternus is considered an invasive species in New Zealand and Australia. In New Zealand, it is particularly considered a problem in coastal shrubland and forest, including islands in the Hauraki Gulf such as Rangitoto. In New Zealand, it is prohibited from sale, propagation and distribution under the National Pest Plant Accord. In Australia, it is particularly a problem in coastal parts of south-eastern Australia.

== Ecology ==
Some species are invasive outside their natural ranges. R. cathartica was introduced into the United States as a garden shrub and has become an invasive species in many areas there. It is a primary host of the soybean aphid (Aphis glycines), a pest for soybean farmers across the US. The aphids use the buckthorn as a host for the winter and then spread to nearby soybean fields in the spring. Italian buckthorn (R. alaternus), an evergreen species from the Mediterranean region, has become a serious weed in some parts of New Zealand, especially on Hauraki Gulf islands.

Buckthorns are used as food plants by the larvae of many Lepidoptera species.

The American species are known to be hosts for the oat fungus Puccinia coronata. In a 1930 study, both kerosene and salt were employed for eradication of R. lanceolata and both proved to be less expensive than felling these bushes.

== Uses ==
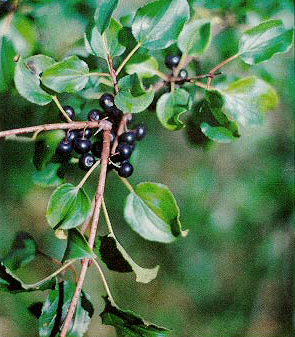
Rhamnus cathartica

The fruit of most species contain a yellow dye and the seeds are rich in protein. Oils from the seeds are used for making lubricating oil, printing ink, and soap. Many species have been used to make dyes. R. utilis provides china green, a dye used to give a bright green color to silk and wool. The bark of some species of Rhamnus afford a beautiful yellow dye. The fruit of the Avignon buckthorn (R. saxatilis), called the Persian berry, produces a yellow dye.

Some species may cause demyelinating polyneuropathies.

The purging buckthorn (R. cathartica) is a widespread European native species used in the past as a purgative. It was in mid 17th-century England the only native purgative. It was also known pre-Linnaeus as Spina Cervina. The berries of Spina Cervina are black and contain a greenish juice, along with four seeds apiece; this serves to distinguish them from those of the black alder and dogberry, which contain only one or two apiece. Its syrup is said to be churlish. Its toxicity makes this a very risky herbal medicine, and it is no longer in use.

Rhamnus prinoides is known as gesho in Ethiopia, where it is used to make a mead called tej.

The species Rhamnus alaternus shows some promise for medicinal use as well.

== See also ==
- Sea buckthorn or Hippophae, an unrelated genus of shrubs with a similar common name
- Frangula, a genus formerly included in Rhamnus
