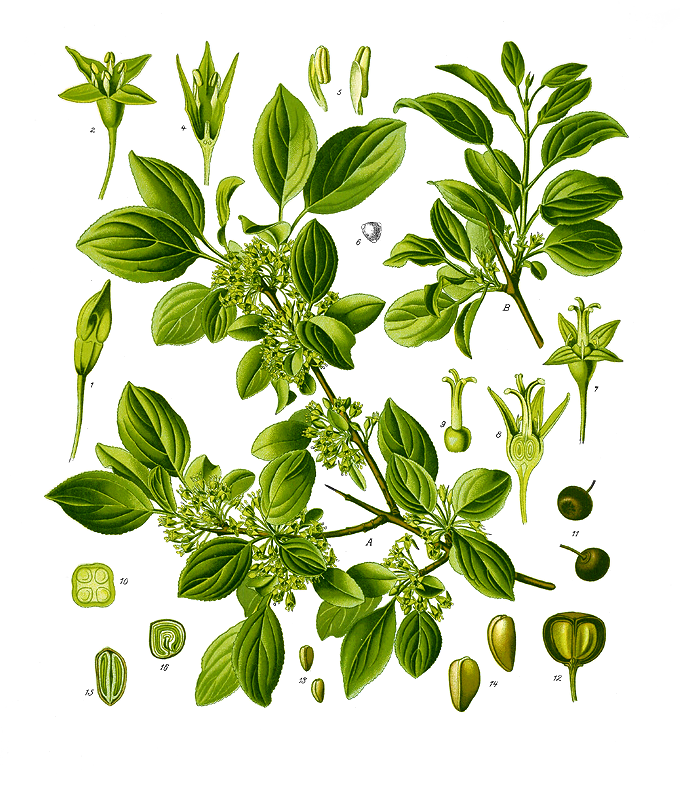

Conservation status
- Least Concern (IUCN 3.1)

Scientific classification
- Kingdom: Plantae
- Clade: Tracheophytes
- Clade: Angiosperms
- Clade: Eudicots
- Clade: Rosids
- Order: Rosales
- Family: Rhamnaceae
- Genus: Rhamnus
- Species: R. cathartica

Binomial name
- Rhamnus cathartica L.

Subspecies
- Rhamnus cathartica var. cathartica; Rhamnus cathartica var. caucasica Kusn.

Synonyms
- Synonymy: Cervispina cathartica (L.) Moench; Rhamnus uninervis Dulac, nom. illeg. superfl. synonyms of various. cathartica: Rhamnus alpina var. hydriensis (Hacq.) Schult.; Rhamnus cadevallii Pau; Rhamnus cathartica f. cadevallii (Pau) Rivas Mart., not validly publ.; Rhamnus cathartica var. hydriensis (Hacq.) P.Fourn.; Rhamnus cathartica subsp. hydriensis (Hacq.) Nyman; Rhamnus cathartica proles hydriensis (Hacq.) Rouy; Rhamnus cathartica var. hydriensis (Hacq.) DC.; Rhamnus cathartica var. inermis Timb.-Lagr.; Rhamnus cathartica var. microphylla Beck; Rhamnus cathartica var. pubescens Lange; Rhamnus cathartica f. pubescens (Lange) Rivas Mart.; Rhamnus cathartica var. repens Hartm.; Rhamnus cathartica var. repens Hartm.; Rhamnus cathartica var. sylvatica (J.Serres) St.-Lag.; Rhamnus cathartica var. sylvatica (J.Serres) Nyman; Rhamnus hydriensis Hacq.; Rhamnus spinosa Gilib., opus utique oppr.; Rhamnus sylvatica J.Serres; Rhamnus wichellii K.Koch; Rhamnus wicklia K.Koch; Rhamnus wihhor Lucé; Rhamnus willdenowiana Schult.; Rhamnus xanthocarpa K.Koch synonyms of var. caucasica: Rhamnus elbursensis Gauba & Rech.f.

= Rhamnus cathartica =

Species of flowering plant in the buckthorn family

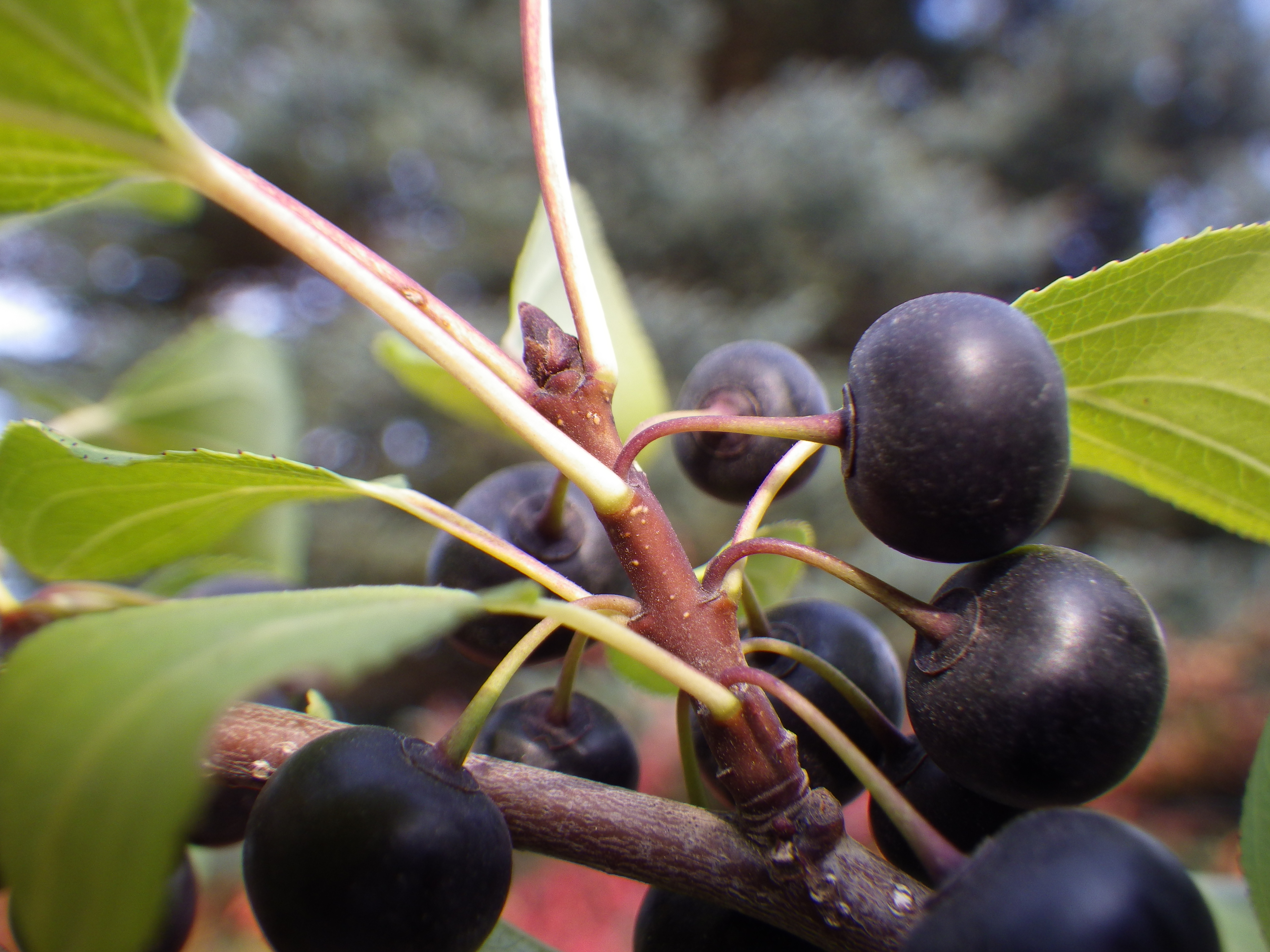
Fruit

Rhamnus cathartica, the European buckthorn, common buckthorn, purging buckthorn, or just buckthorn, is a species of small tree in the flowering plant family Rhamnaceae. It is native to Europe, northwest Africa and western Asia, from the central British Isles south to Morocco, and east to Kyrgyzstan. It was introduced to North America as an ornamental shrub in the early 19th century, and is now naturalized and classified as an invasive species in the northern United States and Canada from Saskatchewan to Nova Scotia.

== Description ==
Rhamnus cathartica is a deciduous, dioecious shrub or small tree growing up to 10 metres (33 ft) tall, with grey-brown bark and often spiny branches. The leaves are elliptic to oval, 25–90 mm (1–3 1/2 in) long and 12–35 mm (1/2–1 3/8 in) broad; they are green, turning yellow in autumn, have toothed margins, and are arranged somewhat variably in opposite to subopposite pairs or alternately. The flowers are yellowish-green with four petals; they are dioecious and insect pollinated and bloom in April–June. The fruit is a globose black drupe, 6–10 mm (1/4–3/8 in) across, and contains two to four seeds.

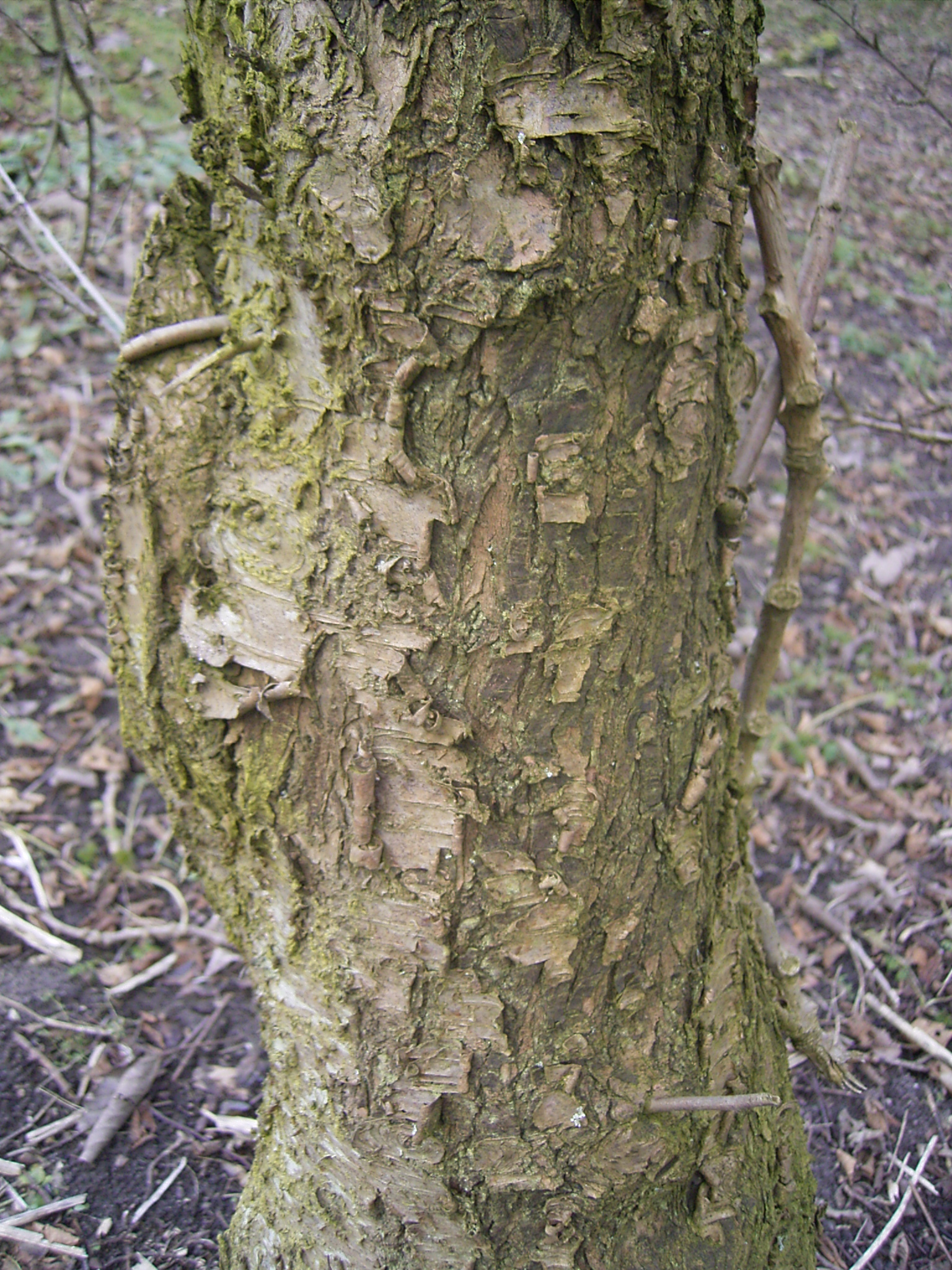
Bark on trunk

In addition to the kindred Frangula alnus, Rhamnus cathartica may be visually confused with a plant of another family, Cornus sanguinea.

The species was originally named by Carl Linnaeus as Rhamnus catharticus, but this spelling was corrected to cathartica as the genus name Rhamnus is treated as being of feminine gender.

== Toxicity ==
The seeds and leaves are mildly poisonous for humans and most other animals, but are readily eaten by birds, who disperse the seeds in their droppings. The toxins cause stomach cramps and laxative effects that may function in seed dispersal. The chemical compounds responsible for this laxative effect are anthraquinone and emodin. The species name cathartica and the common name purging buckthorn refer to this effect.

In 1994, R. cathartica was implicated in the outbreak of an idiopathic neurological disease in horses, although no causative agent was officially identified. In trials where rodents were fed the leaves and stems of R. cathartica, glycogen metabolism became abnormal and glycogen deposits formed in the cytoplasm of liver cells. Abnormalities in glycogen metabolism lead to diabetes in humans.

== Ecology ==
Rhamnus cathartica is shade-tolerant, moderately fast-growing and short-lived. It is a food plant of the brimstone butterfly, Gonepteryx rhamni. The sulphur-yellow males are indicative of the presence of this species or of its alternative host, Frangula alnus.

Rhamnus cathartica is the alternate host for the rust disease of cereals caused by Puccinia coronata. Crown rust fungus results in leaf damage and reductions in photosynthesis during its transit in this species. Rhamnus cathartica is also the primary overwintering host in North America for a significant agricultural pest of soybeans, the soybean aphid.

=== Allelopathy ===
Secondary compounds, particularly emodin, have been found in the fruit, leaves, and bark of the plant, and may protect it from insects, herbivores and pathogens. The emodin present in R. cathartica fruit may prevent early consumption, as it is found most in unripe fruits, which allows seeds to reach maturity before being dispersed. Birds and mice significantly avoid eating unripe fruits, and if forced to ingest emodin or unripe fruit, the animals regurgitate the meal or produce loose, watery stools. Rhamnus cathartica is a constitutive isoprene emitter

Allelopathic effects of exudates from R. cathartica leaf litter, roots, bark, leaves and fruit may reduce germination of other plant species in the soil. Soils in buckthorn-dominated areas are higher in nitrogen and carbon than normal soils, which speeds up decomposition rates of leaf litter. This can result in bare patches of soil being formed and R. cathartica performs well in such disturbed habitats, so this may be adaptive for the setting of its seed.

=== Invasive species ===
The species is naturalised and invasive in parts of North America. Rhamnus cathartica has a competitive advantage over native trees and shrubs in North America because of root competition, the shade it produces, and it leafs out before native species. Of the annual carbon gain in R. cathartica, 27–35% comes from photosynthesis occurring before the leaves of other plants emerge. Soil in woodlands dominated by R. cathartica was higher in nitrogen, pH and water content than soil in woodlands relatively free of R. cathartica, probably because R. cathartica has high levels of nitrogen in its leaves and these leaves decompose rapidly.

Rhamnus cathartica is also associated with invasive European earthworms (Lumbricus spp.) in the northern Midwest of North America. Removing R. cathartica led to a decrease of around 50% in the biomass of invasive earthworms.

Soils enriched by extra nitrogen from decayed buckthorn leaves and additional earthworm activity impair North American forest ecosystems: "Invasive earthworms, which need rich litter, break [buckthorn leaves] down rapidly, destroying beneficial fungi and exposing bare soils in the process. These soils provide ideal conditions for buckthorn germination and seedling growth but many native trees and shrubs need the beneficial fungi and will not reproduce without it."

Common buckthorn can be found in most northern states of the United States and it is particularly prevalent in the Great Lakes states of Minnesota, Wisconsin, and Michigan. A current map of its distribution can be found at Early Detection and Distribution Mapping System (EDDmapS). This species is largely bird-dispersed, but only a subset of bird species that eat the fruit are competent dispersers. It is winter hardy in USDA zones: 3 to 8. It is a prohibited species in a few US states; Minnesota lists it as a Restricted noxious weed making it illegal to import, sell, or transport the plant, Connecticut, Iowa, Massachusetts, New Hampshire, also restrict or ban the plant, and Vermont lists it as a Class B noxious weed.

=== Control ===
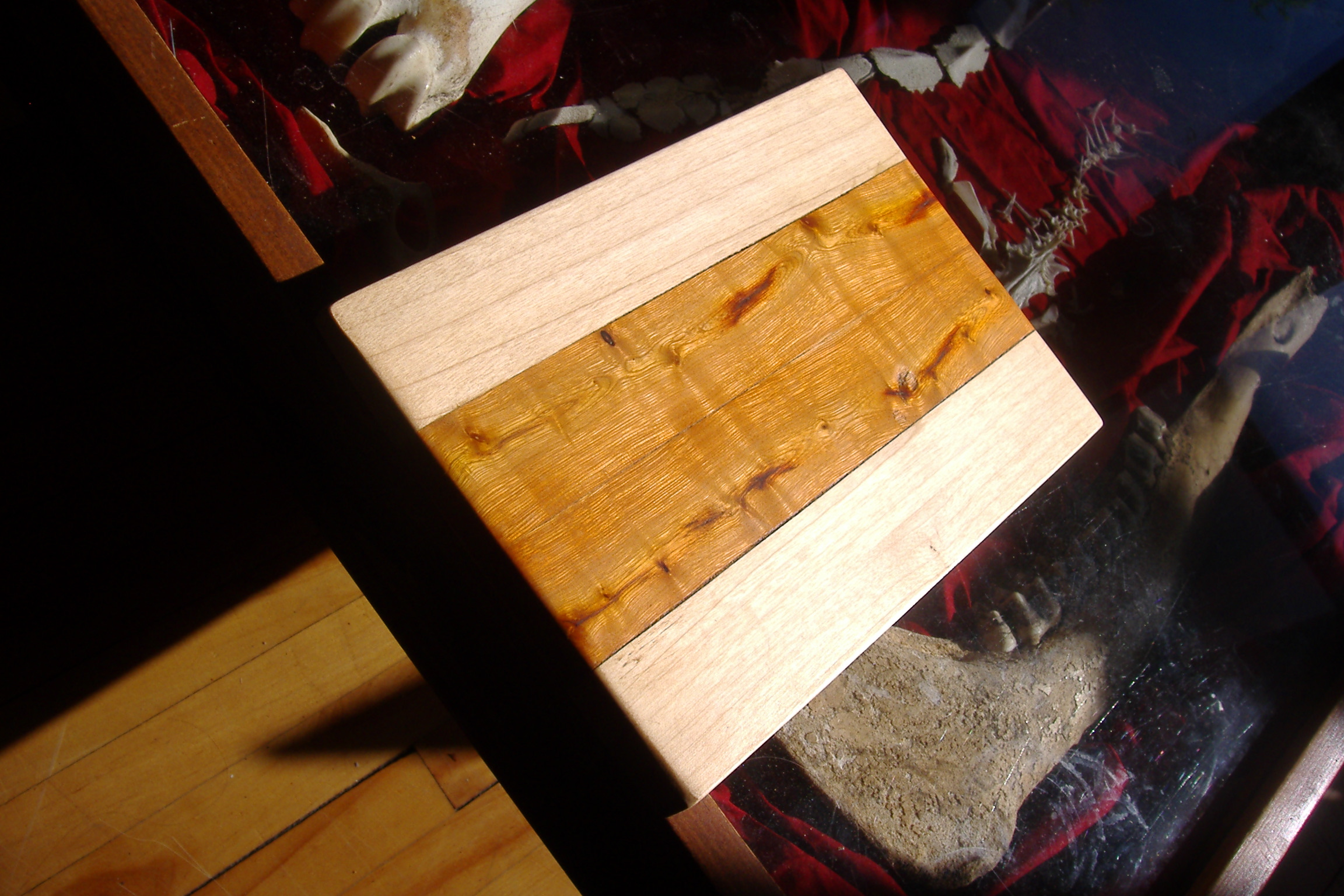
Cutting board made from common buckthorn and Norway maple

Rhamnus cathartica is difficult to control in its invasive range, because it sprouts vigorously and repeatedly from the root collar following cutting, girdling or burning. Herbicide application to newly cut stumps is a popular and effective control method, but seeds stay viable in the soil for several years before sprouting, so repeated treatments and long-term monitoring of infested areas is required. Triclopyr and picloram and their derivatives have been found to be effective chemical means of control. Glyphosate (such as Roundup) can be used but is less reliable. An application of these chemicals in early winter reduces the risk of negatively affecting non-target species, as most have gone dormant by this time. It is also easier to spot infestations at this time of the year, as the leaves of R. catharticus stay out an average of 58 days longer than native plants.

Mechanical control methods such as pulling and chopping of plants are more environmentally friendly, but also very time-consuming. Plants with stems less than half an inch in diameter or less than a metre (3') tall can easily be pulled, but pulling risks disturbing the roots of adjacent, native plants and harming them as well. Propane weed-torches may also be used to kill seedlings, which will generally not resprout if burned in spring or early summer.

== Uses ==
The bark and fruit of Rhamnus cathartica were used as a purgative in traditional medicine, but is generally no longer used for this purpose on account of the fruit's violent action and potentially dangerous effects on the body. It also appeared to be routinely used as a purgative in some monastic settings, as was clear from the latrine pits of the Benedictine Abbey at St Albans excavated in the 1920s, where great numbers of buckthorn seeds were found mixed up with the fragments of cloth used by the monks as lavatory paper.

The wood is hard and dense, and the bark yields a dye.
