= Rhamnus japonica =

Scientific classification
- Kingdom: Plantae
- Clade: Tracheophytes
- Clade: Angiosperms
- Clade: Eudicots
- Clade: Rosids
- Order: Rosales
- Family: Rhamnaceae
- Genus: Rhamnus
- Species: R. japonica

Binomial name
- Rhamnus japonica Maxim.

Species of tree

Rhamnus japonica, the Japanese buckthorn, is a species within the genus Rhamnus. It is described as a perennial tree. It was also introduced to the United States at an unknown time. In North America, it is known to live in Illinois. Rhamnus is the ancient Greek name for buckthorn. Japonica means Japanese.
