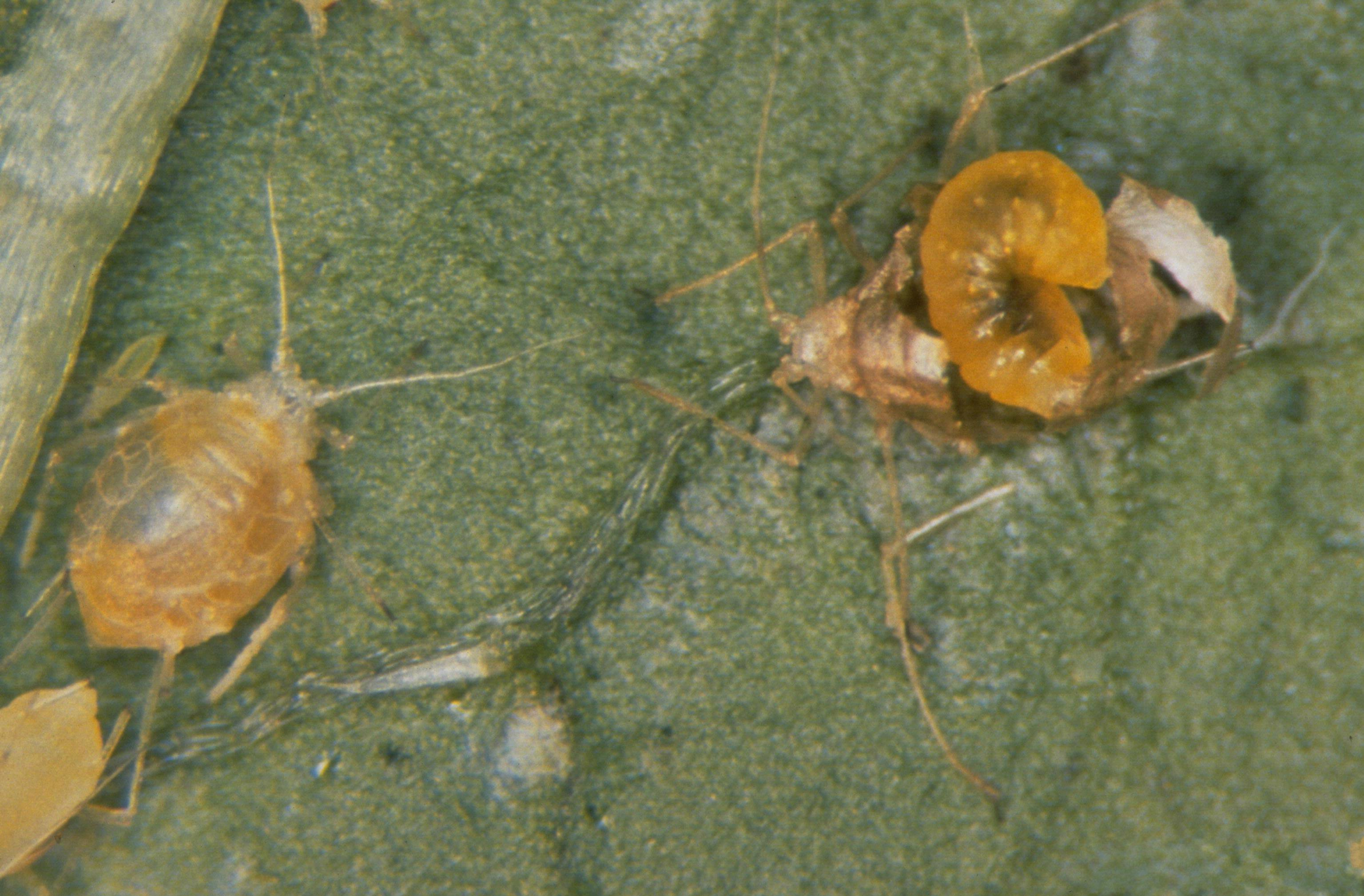
- Diaeretiella rapae larva exposed in its aphid host

Scientific classification
- Kingdom: Animalia
- Phylum: Arthropoda
- Class: Insecta
- Order: Hymenoptera
- Family: Braconidae
- Subfamily: Aphidiinae
- Tribe: Aphidiini
- Genus: Diaeretiella; Stary, 1960
- Species: D. rapae

Binomial name
- Diaeretiella rapae (M'Intosh, 1855)

= Diaeretiella =

Species of wasp

Diaeretiella rapae is a species of cosmopolitan parasitoid wasp. It parasitizes many species of aphids, but especially the cabbage aphid, Brevicoryne brassicae. It is the only species in the genus Diaeretiella.

Other host aphids include Aphis craccivora, Aphis fabae, Aphis gossypii, Aphis nasturtii, Aphis pomi, Aphis rumicis, Brachycolus asparagi, Brachycaudus helichrysi, Brachycaudus rumexicolens, Capitophonis, Dactynotus sp., Diuraphis noxius, Hayhurstia atriplicis, Hyadaphis foeniculi, Lipaphis erysimi, Macrosiphum euphorbiae, Myzus certus, Myzus persicae, Protaphis sp., Rhopalosiphum fitchii, Rhopalosiphum maidis, Rhopalosiphum padi and Schizaphis graminum.
