= E. europaeus =

E. europaeus may refer to:

- Erinaceus europaeus, the European hedgehog or common hedgehog, a mammal species found in northern and western Europe
- Euonymus europaeus, the spindle, European spindle or common spindle, a deciduous shrub or small tree species
