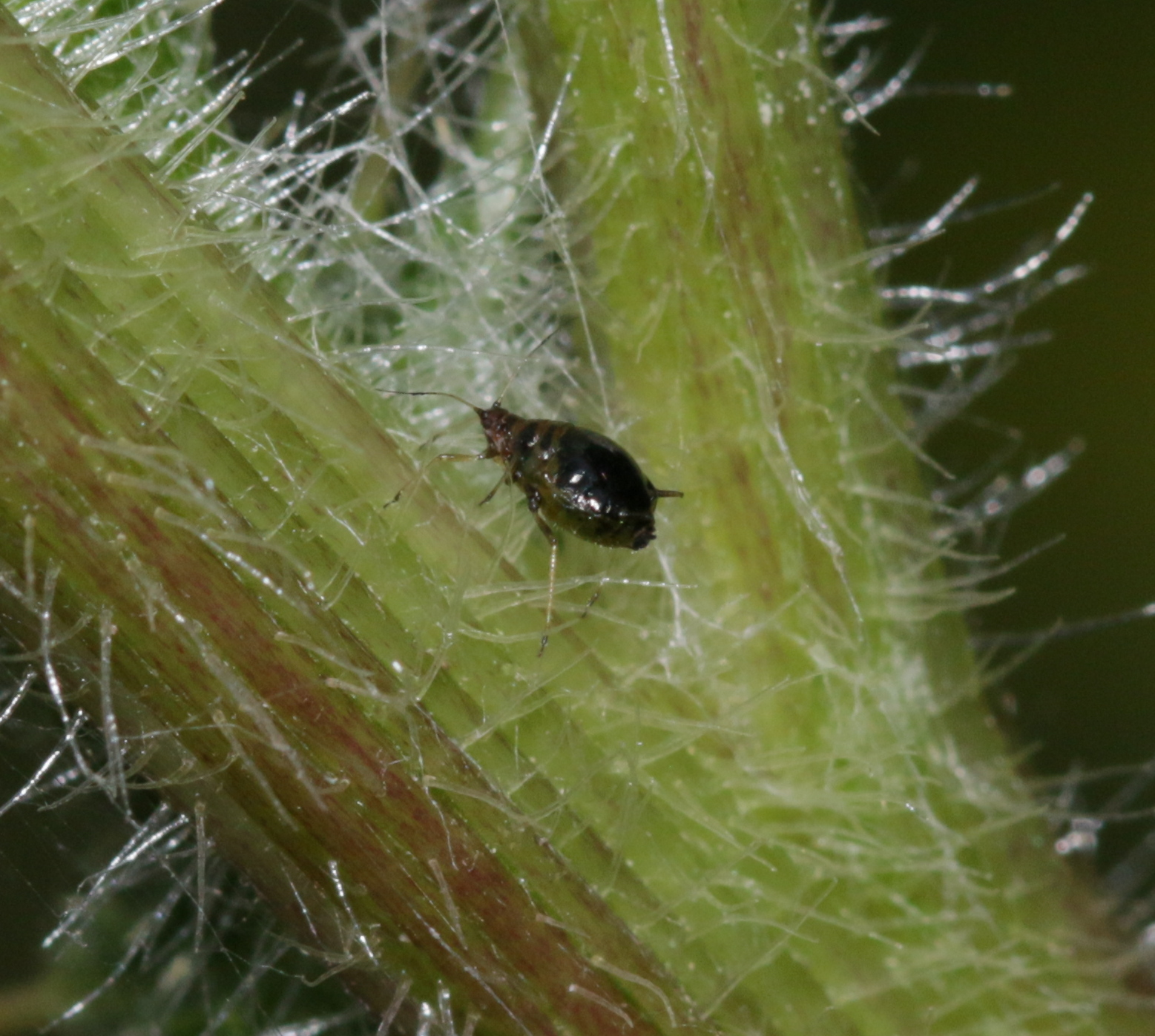

Scientific classification
- Kingdom: Animalia
- Phylum: Arthropoda
- Clade: Pancrustacea
- Class: Insecta
- Order: Hemiptera
- Suborder: Sternorrhyncha
- Family: Aphididae
- Genus: Brachycaudus
- Species: B. cardui

Binomial name
- Brachycaudus cardui (Linnaeus, 1758)

Synonyms
- Anuraphis cardui; Aphis cardui

= Brachycaudus cardui =

Species of insect (aphid)

Brachycaudus cardui is a species of aphid, commonly known as the thistle aphid or the plum-thistle aphid. It infests trees in the genus Prunus in the spring and autumn, and mostly plants in the aster family in the summer.

== Description ==
The viviparous wingless females of B. cardui have an oval or pear-shaped body and grow to a length of from 1.8 to 2.5 mm (0.07 to 0.10 in). The colour may be green, yellowish, reddish or brown. The abdomen has a dark, shining patch on the dorsal surface, a fact which distinguishes this species from the otherwise similar plum leaf curl aphid (Brachycaudus helichrysi). Nymphs often have pinkish blotches on a dark green background.

== Distribution ==
Brachycaudus cardui has a wide distribution in Europe, Asia, North Africa and North America.

== Biology ==
The primary host of B. cardui is plum, cherry, apricot, peach or damson, but during the summer months it moves to a secondary host. This is often a thistle in the genera Carduus or Cirsium where it is commonly seen on the stems and flowerheads. Alternatively, other plants in the aster family or plants in the borage family (Boraginaceae) may be used as secondary hosts. Winged individuals fly back to the primary hosts in the autumn.

Colonies of B. cardui are usually attended by ants which feed on the honeydew the aphids produce and drive away predators. Researchers found that in a damp meadow which contained ragwort (Jacobaea vulgaris) but no ants, although winged B. cardui arrived at the site, they failed to establish colonies despite an abundance of the host plant. In an experimental habitat, colonies of B. cardui on J. vulgaris flourished when ants were present but died out if ants were excluded.

== Damage ==
Infestation with B. cardui causes the margins of affected leaves to roll up. This aphid is a vector of plum pox, a serious viral disease affecting plums, damsons, peaches, apricots and some other plants.
