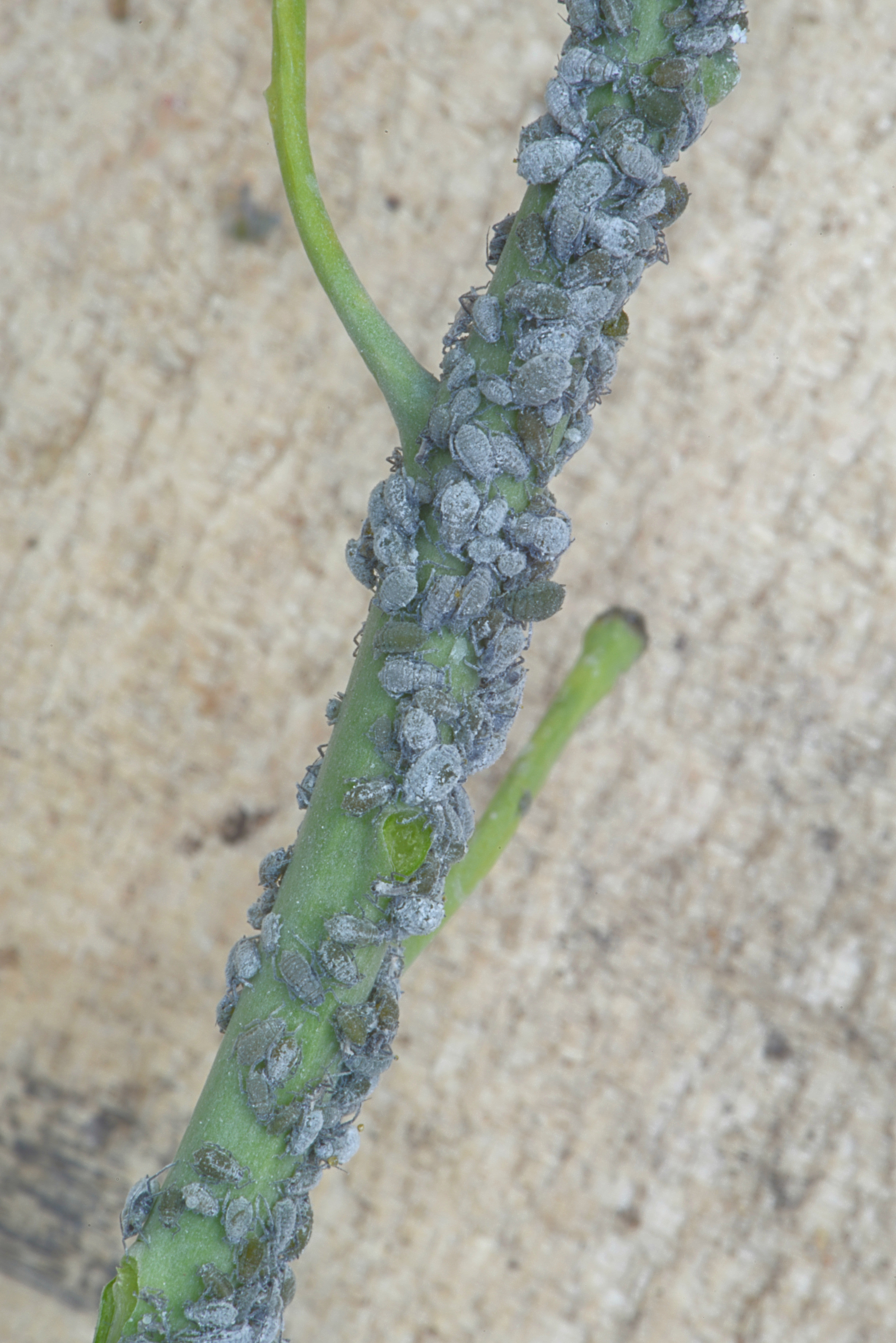
- Brevicoryne brassicae on curly kale

Scientific classification
- Kingdom: Animalia
- Phylum: Arthropoda
- Clade: Pancrustacea
- Class: Insecta
- Order: Hemiptera
- Suborder: Sternorrhyncha
- Family: Aphididae
- Genus: Brevicoryne
- Species: B. brassicae

Binomial name
- Brevicoryne brassicae (Linnaeus, 1758)

Synonyms
- Aphis brassicae

= Brevicoryne brassicae =

Species of true bug

Brevicoryne brassicae, commonly known as the cabbage aphid or cabbage aphis, is a destructive aphid (plant louse) native to Europe that is now found in many other areas of the world. The aphids feed on many varieties of produce, including cabbage, broccoli (especially), Brussels sprouts, cauliflower and many other members of the genus Brassica, but do not feed on plants outside of the family Brassicaceae. The insects entirely avoid plants other than those of Brassicaceae; even though thousands may be eating broccoli near strawberries, the strawberries will be left untouched.

Cabbage aphids, from the genus Brevicoryne of the family Aphididae, are grayish-green, but a waxy covering gives them a grayish-white to powdery blue appearance.

== Predator defense mechanism ==
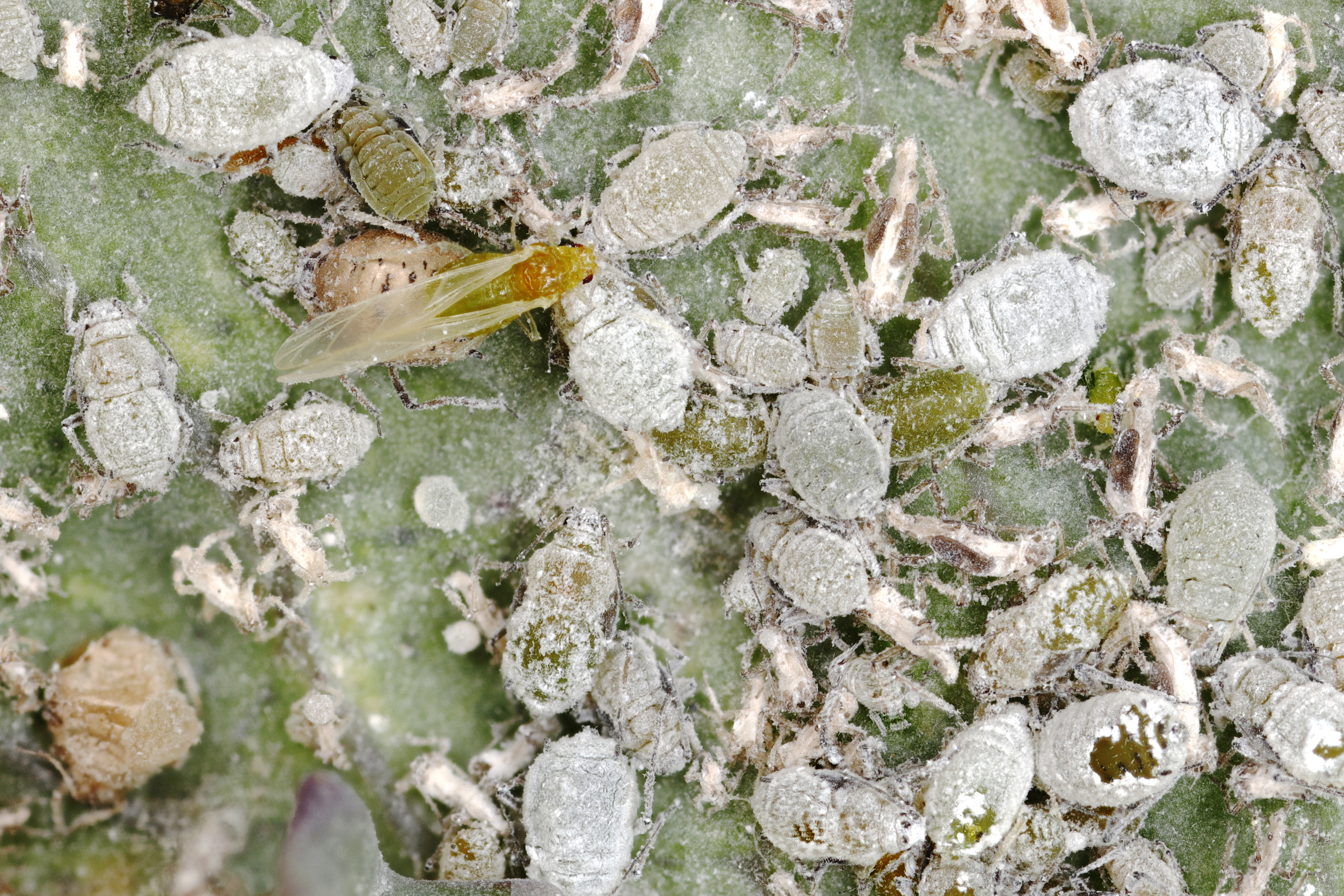
Cabbage Aphids on Kale Leaf

Cabbage aphids produce a myrosinase (beta-thioglucoside glucohydrolase) enzyme in head and thoracic muscles; the aphids also uptake glucosinolates, particularly sinigrin, from the plants on which they feed, storing the glucosinolates in their haemolymph. (Glucosinolates are natural defenses for plants in the order Brassicales against pests and herbivores.) The combination of the glucosinolates and the myrosinase enzyme produces a violent chemical reaction that releases the mustard oil chemical allyl isothiocyanate. The defense mechanism has a dramatic negative effect on the survival of the larval ladybird predator Adalia bipunctata. The chemical defence of the aphids has been likened to a "walking mustard oil bomb".

The myrosinase from Brevicoryne brassicae appears to have evolved separately from myrosinases found in plants, possibly a case of convergent evolution. Aphid myrosinase appears to have greater similarity to animal beta-O-glucosidases than to plant myrosinases.

== Pest control ==
Different varieties of cultivars have varying resistance to Brevicoryne brassicae.

Diaeretiella rapae is a common wasp parasitoid of cabbage aphids. Other controlling insects include ladybird beetles, syrphid fly larvae, and lacewing larvae. Some insecticidal soaps may be effective in treating aphid infestations.
