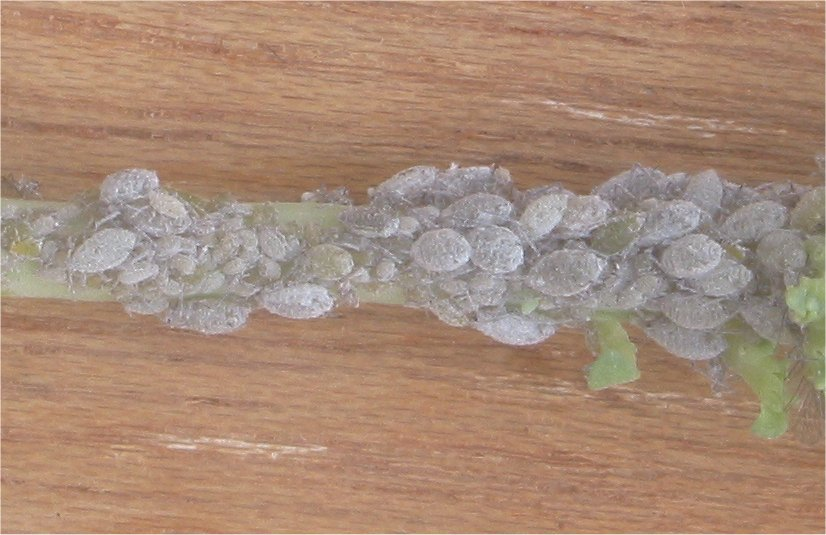
- Brevicoryne brassicae

Scientific classification
- Domain: Eukaryota
- Kingdom: Animalia
- Phylum: Arthropoda
- Class: Insecta
- Order: Hemiptera
- Suborder: Sternorrhyncha
- Family: Aphididae
- Tribe: Macrosiphini
- Genus: Brevicoryne van der Goot, 1915

Species
- See text

= Brevicoryne =

Genus of true bugs

Brevicoryne is a genus of aphid insect that contains many species which are agricultural pests.

== Hosts ==
This genus parasitizes a wide range of hosts, with many members of the Brassicaceae (broccoli, cabbage, kale, etc.) included.

== Adults ==
Adults are distinguished from the nymphs by their darker body. They may (alate) or may not exhibit wings.

== Parasites ==
Many species of wasps parasitize the juvenile (nymph); injecting their eggs using their ovipositor creating 'mummies' (so called because of their desiccated appearance).

== Species ==
- Brevicoryne arctica Richards, 1963
- Brevicoryne barbareae Nevsky 1929
- Brevicoryne brassicae Linnaeus, 1758, the cabbage aphid
- Brevicoryne crambe Bozhko, 1950
- Brevicoryne crambinistataricae Bozhko, 1953
- Brevicoryne fraterna Strom, 1938
- Brevicoryne jiayuguanensis Zhang, Chen, Zhong & Li, 1999
- Brevicoryne lonicerina Mukh & Akhm, 1980
- Brevicoryne nigrosiphunculata Hodjat, 1981
- Brevicoryne shaposhnikovi Narzikulov, 1957

== See also ==
- Pest (organism)
- Biodiversity
- IPM

== Sources ==
- "Brevicoryne brassicae (linnaeus)". EXTension ENTOmology & UH-CTAHR Integrated Pest Management Program, University of Hawaii.
- Zhang, G.; Chen, X.; Zhong, T. & Li, J. (1999). Zhang, Guangxue; et al. (eds.). Aphididae. Fauna of Agricultural and Forestry Aphids of Northwest, China: Insecta Homoptera Aphidinea (in Chinese). Beijing: China Environmental Sciences Press. pp. 273–508. ISBN 978-7-80135-635-2.
