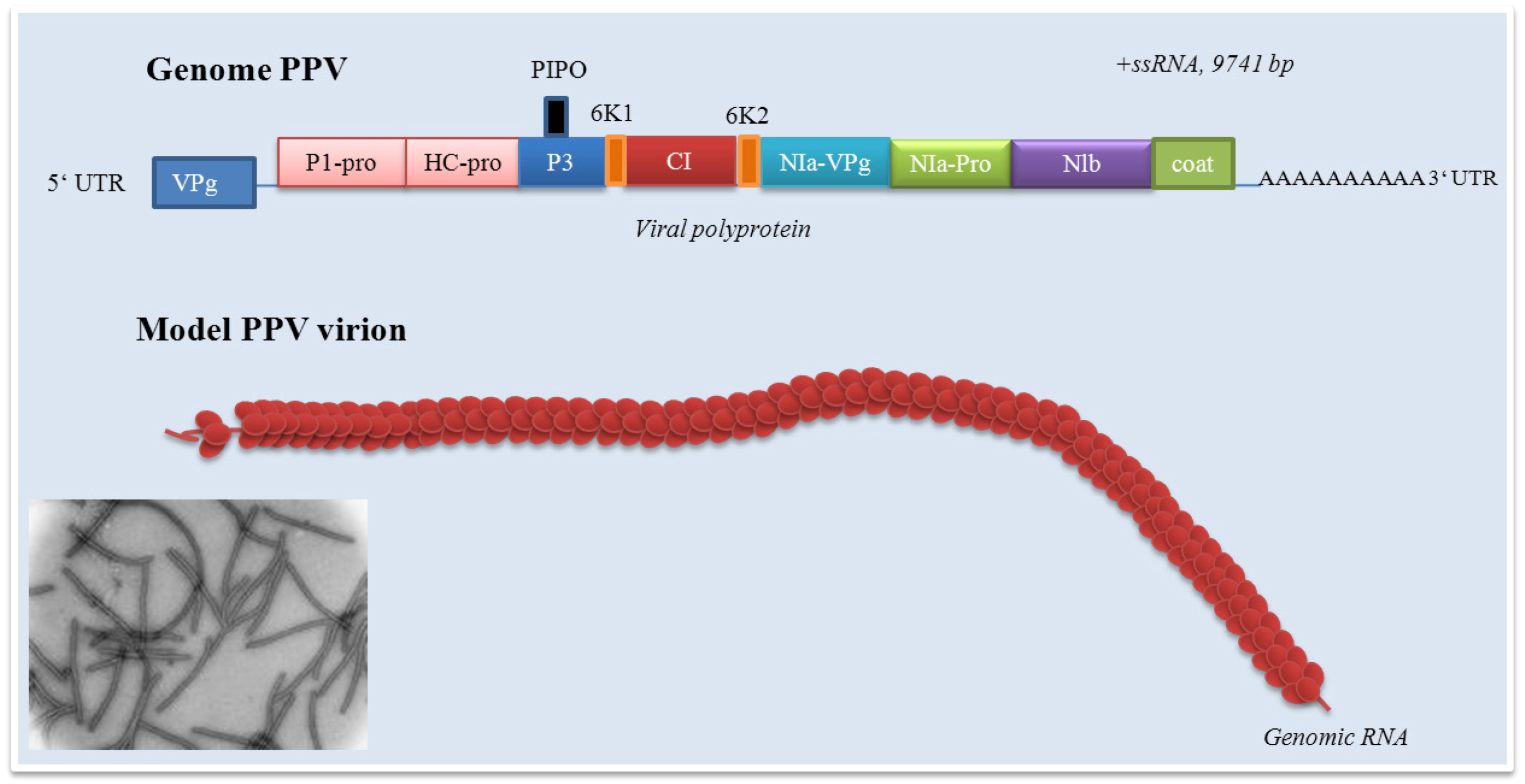
- Genome of PPV with electron micrograph and model of virions

Virus classification
- (unranked): Virus
- Realm: Riboviria
- Kingdom: Orthornavirae
- Phylum: Pisuviricota
- Class: Stelpaviricetes
- Order: Patatavirales
- Family: Potyviridae
- Genus: Potyvirus
- Species: Potyvirus plumpoxi

= Plum pox =

Plum pox virus

Viral plant disease

Plum pox, also known as sharka, is the most devastating viral disease of stone fruit from the genus Prunus. The disease is caused by the plum pox virus (PPV), and the different strains may infect a variety of stone fruit species including peaches, apricots, plums, nectarine, almonds, and sweet and tart cherries. Wild and ornamental species of Prunus may also become infected by some strains of the virus.

The virus is transmitted by aphids and by the transfer of infected plant material to new locations. Plum pox poses no danger to consumers, but it can ruin the marketability of stone fruit by causing acidity and deformities. The only way to manage the disease is to destroy all infected trees, which can cause significant economic losses.

== Historical background ==
The disease symptoms were first seen in Bulgaria around 1916–1917. Hence, the name of sharka, which is from the Bulgarian шарка for pox. In 1933, the virus origin was described by Dimităr Atanasov. The disease developed and spread in several European countries, and may have largely wiped out the ancient landrace variously called Pozegaca, Quetsche, or German prune.

== Biology ==
The plum pox virus is a linear single-stranded RNA virus. There are nine strains of plum pox virus: PPV-D, PPV-M, PPV-EA, PPV-C, PPV-Rec (Recombinant), PPV-W, PPV-T, PPV-CR, and PPV-An. PPV-T (Turkey) was detected first and so far only in Turkey, although its isolates are capable to naturally infect most of important Prunus spp. PPV-C infects sweet and tart cherry naturally and is the only strain known to do so, it has infected other Prunus hosts experimentally.

PPV-M isolates are more aggressive in peach, are aphid vectored more efficiently, and spread more rapidly in an orchard. PPV-M has been reported to be seed transmitted, the other PPV strains are known not be transmitted through seeds. Both PPV strains M and D infest peach, plum, and apricot. PPV-M was previously divided into two variants: Ma and Mb with distribution in European Mediterranean and central-eastern European countries, respectively, but another variant was recently detected in Istanbul, Turkey, and appropriately named MIs. Two MIs isolates were also detected in Bolu province, which is very close to Istanbul, and the isolates cross reacted with a mixture of polyclonal antibodies and monoclonal 5B-IVIA purchased commercially as ELISA kit for universal identification of PPV strains. Genetic analysis also confirmed the very high identity of Ma, Mb, and MIs variants at 836 bp P3-6K1-CI region.

== Pathology ==
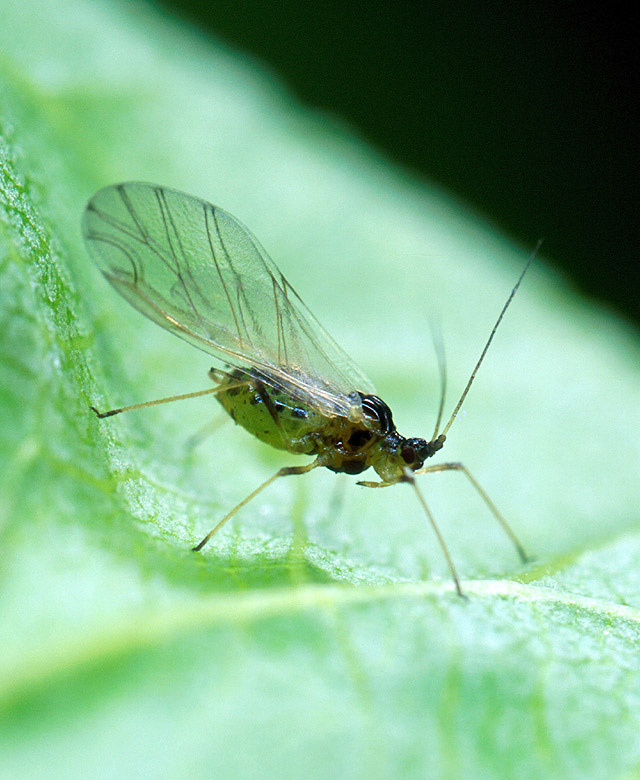
The aphid Myzus persicae is a vector for plum pox virus in the United States.

Several species of aphid transmit the virus including the plum-thistle aphid (Brachycaudus cardui), the plum leaf curl aphid (Brachycaudus helichrysi) and the green peach aphid (Myzus persicae). Winged aphids can transmit plum pox within an orchard, and over short distances (200–300 meters) to trees in nearby orchards. Unlike some other viruses, like barley yellow dwarf virus, PPV is not persistent in the aphid and is transferred from the mouthparts of the aphid between plants. Long distance spread usually occurs as a result of the movement of infected nursery stock or propagative materials. Once a plant is infected the virus is systemic and occurs in the cytoplasm of cells from all parts of the plant.

When a host tree is infected by plum pox, the infection eventually results in severely reduced fruit production, and the fruit that is produced is often misshapen and blemished. The presence of plum pox can also enhance the effects of other endemic viruses infecting various species of the genus Prunus, such as prune dwarf virus, Prunus necrotic (browning) ringspot virus, and apple chlorotic (yellowing) leaf spot virus, resulting in still greater economic losses.

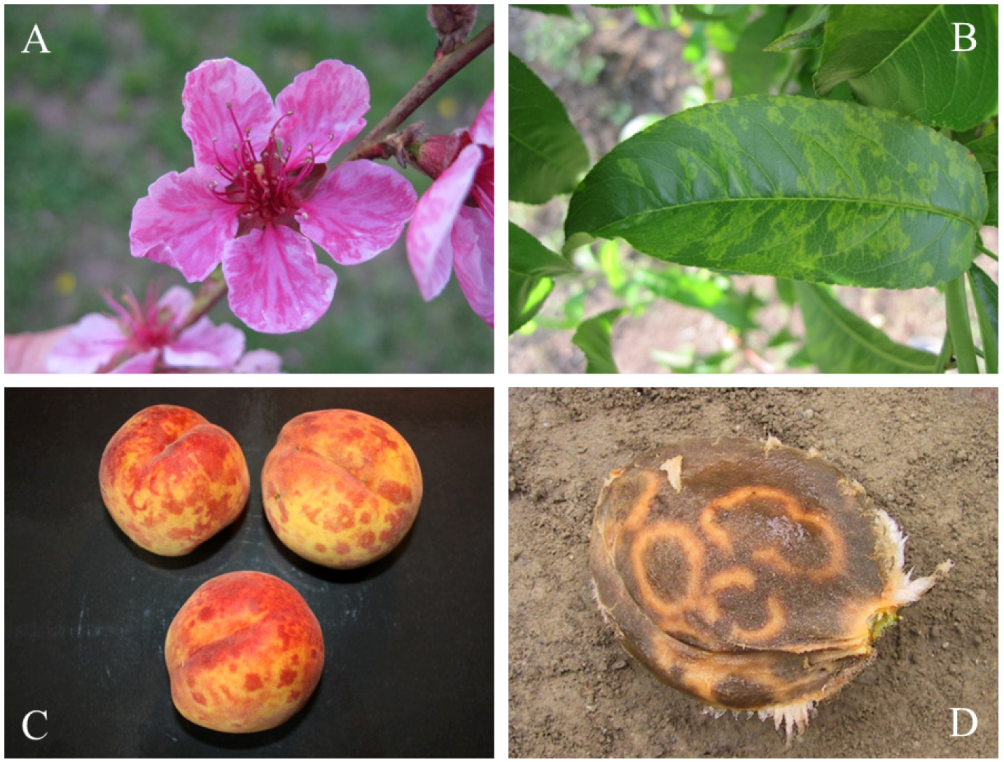
Plum pox infection in peach. A) blossoms showing typical speckling B) Chlorotic rings and blotches in leaves C) Yellow rings on fruit D) Rings on the pit stone.

In peach, infected trees may exhibit color-breaking symptoms in the blossoms. This appears as darker pink stripes on the flower petals and can be useful for early season surveys. Symptoms can be present in young leaves in the spring and/or on developing fruit. Some trees show no symptoms on leaves or fruit.

Not all infection in Prunus are characterized by a ring symptom on leaves. Several cultivars show yellowing line patterns and blotches, or necrotic ring symptoms on expanded leaves. Leaf distortion has also been observed. Infected fruit can develop yellow rings or blotches, or brown rings, and some plum and apricot fruit can be severely deformed and bumpy. The seed of many infected apricots and some plums show rings.

Many non-Prunus species, in at least nine plant families, have been infected artificially with one or more strains of the plum pox virus, and in some cases found naturally infected in the field. The maintenance of the virus in non-Prunus species complicates disease management.

== Management ==
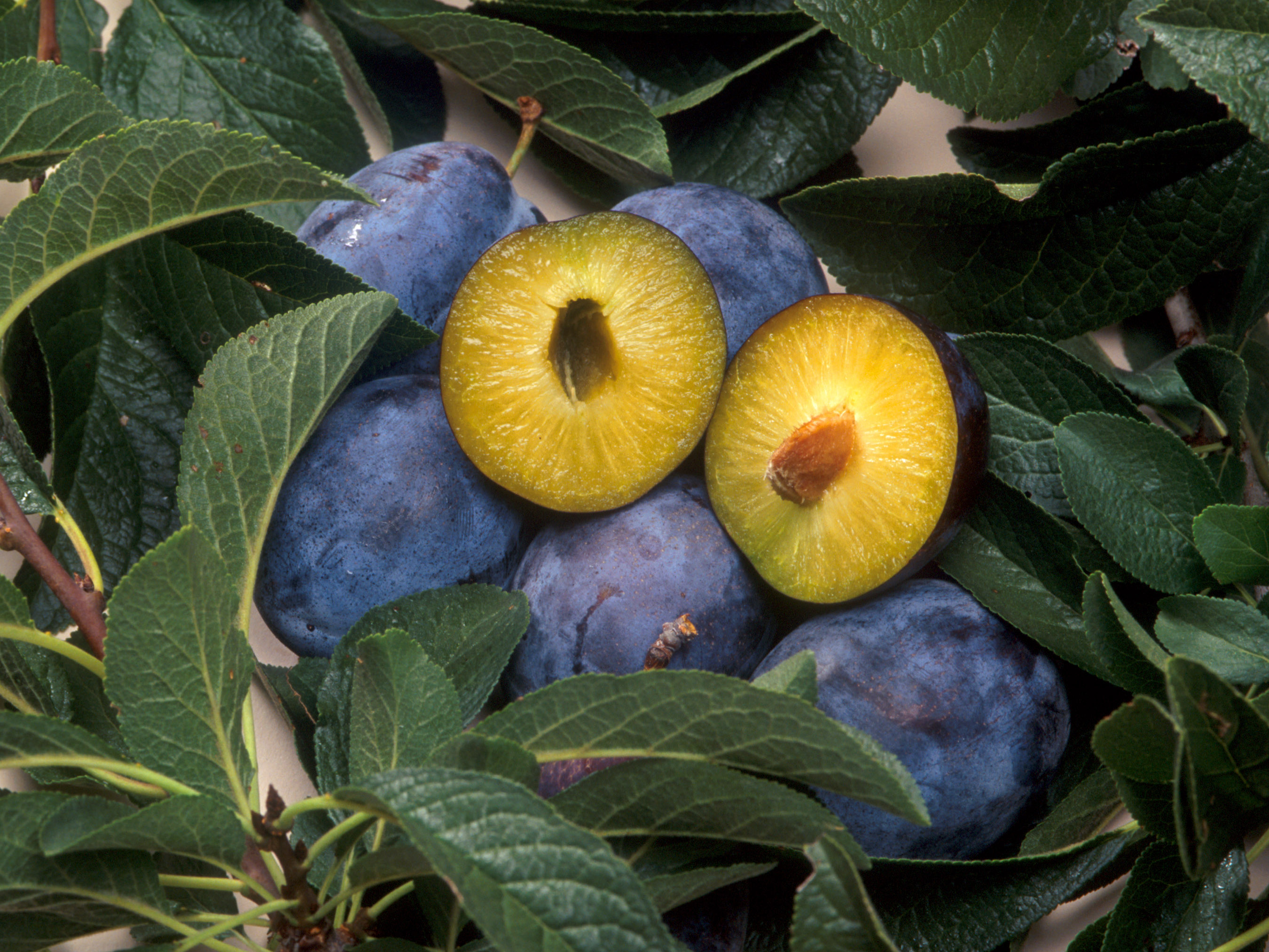
C5 genetically modified plum pox resistant plum (Prunus domestica).

No cure or treatment is known for the disease once a tree becomes infected. Infected trees must be destroyed. Once the disease becomes established, control and prevention measures for plum pox include field surveys, use of certified nursery materials, control of aphids, and elimination of infected trees in nurseries and orchards.

Sources of resistance exist in Prunus, but are not common. A team of scientists from France and the United States has genetically engineered a plum pox-resistant plum called C5, and the resistance can be transferred through hybridization to other plum trees. The transgenic plum expresses a plum pox virus coat protein, the plant produces the coat protein mRNA and it is processed by a system called post transcriptional gene silencing (PTGS), which functions like the plants' immune system and is mechanistically similar to RNAi.

== Distribution ==
Disease status	Country
Restricted distribution	Albania, Austria, Canada, Cyprus, Czech Republic, France, Italy, Japan, Luxembourg, Moldova, Norway, Portugal, Southern Russia, Slovenia, Spain, Syria, Turkey, Ukraine, United Kingdom, United States
Widespread	Bulgaria, Croatia, Germany, Greece, Hungary, Poland, Romania, Slovakia
Introduced, established	Azores, Bosnia-Herzegovina, Egypt, Former USSR including Central Asia, India, Lithuania
Introduced, presumably eradicated	Belgium, Netherlands, Switzerland
Unknown	Chile, Denmark
Modified from: Levy et al. 2000. Plum Pox Potyvirus Disease of Stone Fruits. American Phytopathological Society

In 1999, plum pox strain PPV-D was detected in an Adams County, Pennsylvania orchard. This was the first time that plum pox had been found in North America. The infected areas were quarantined to prevent the spread of the disease, and infected trees were destroyed.

In 2000, detection occurred in Nova Scotia and in Southern Ontario, particularly in the Niagara Region. The Canadian Food Inspection Agency put into effect quarantine zones throughout Southern Ontario in a bid to prevent the spread of PPV. The virus has yet to be found in other areas of Canada which contain susceptible trees despite intense surveying. The Canadian plum pox eradication initiative has involved large numbers of samples tested for the plum pox virus. Samples are tested through a technology known as enzyme linked immunosorbent assay (ELISA).
