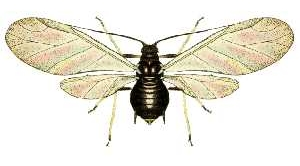

Scientific classification
- Kingdom: Animalia
- Phylum: Arthropoda
- Clade: Pancrustacea
- Class: Insecta
- Order: Hemiptera
- Suborder: Sternorrhyncha
- Family: Aphididae
- Subfamily: Aphidinae
- Tribe: Macrosiphini
- Genus: Brachycaudus van der Goot, 1913

= Brachycaudus =

Genus of true bugs

Brachycaudus is a genus of aphids of the family Aphididae.

== Selected species ==
- Brachycaudus cardui
- Brachycaudus helichrysi
- Brachycaudus rumexicolens
