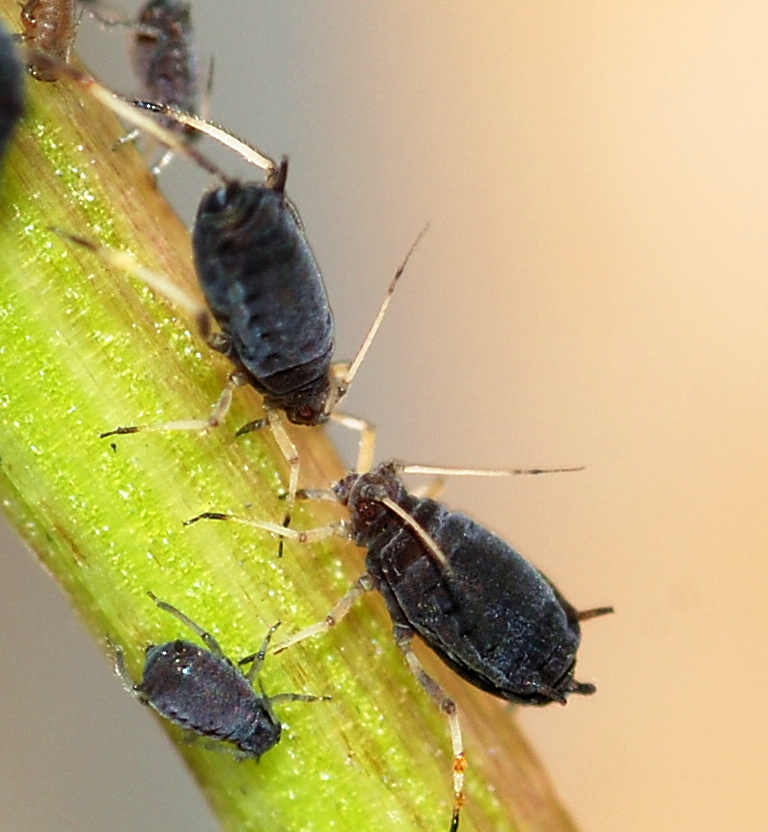
- Two wingless adults and a nymph

Scientific classification
- Kingdom: Animalia
- Phylum: Arthropoda
- Class: Insecta
- Order: Hemiptera
- Suborder: Sternorrhyncha
- Family: Aphididae
- Genus: Aphis
- Species: A. fabae

Binomial name
- Aphis fabae Scopoli, 1763

= Black bean aphid =

Aphis fabae

Species of true bug

The black bean aphid (Aphis fabae) is a small black insect in the genus Aphis, with a broad, soft body, a member of the order Hemiptera. Other common names include blackfly, bean aphid, and beet leaf aphid. In the warmer months of the year, it is found in large numbers on the undersides of leaves and on the growing tips of host plants, including various agricultural crops and many wild and ornamental plants. Both winged and wingless forms exist, and at this time of year, they are all females. They suck sap from stems and leaves and cause distortion of the shoots, stunted plants, reduced yield, and spoiled crops. This aphid also acts as a vector for viruses that cause plant disease, and the honeydew it secretes may encourage the growth of sooty mold. It breeds profusely by live birth, but its numbers are kept in check, especially in the later part of the summer, by various predatory and parasitic insects. Ants feed on the honeydew it produces, and take active steps to remove predators. It is a widely distributed pest of agricultural crops and can be controlled by chemical or biological means. In the autumn, winged forms move to different host plants, where both males and females are produced. These mate and the females lay eggs which overwinter.

== Taxonomy ==
The specific name of the black bean aphid, fabae comes from the Latin faba meaning a "bean", a plant on which this aphid often feeds. Aphis fabae is in the superfamily Aphidoidea and the subgenus Aphis.

Some taxonomists consider it a group of related species, or possibly biotypes.

Fauna Europaea lists six subspecies:

- A. f. cirsiiacanthoidis
- A. f. eryngii
- A. f. evonymi
- A. f. fabae
- A. f. mordvilkoi
- A. f. solanella

== Description ==
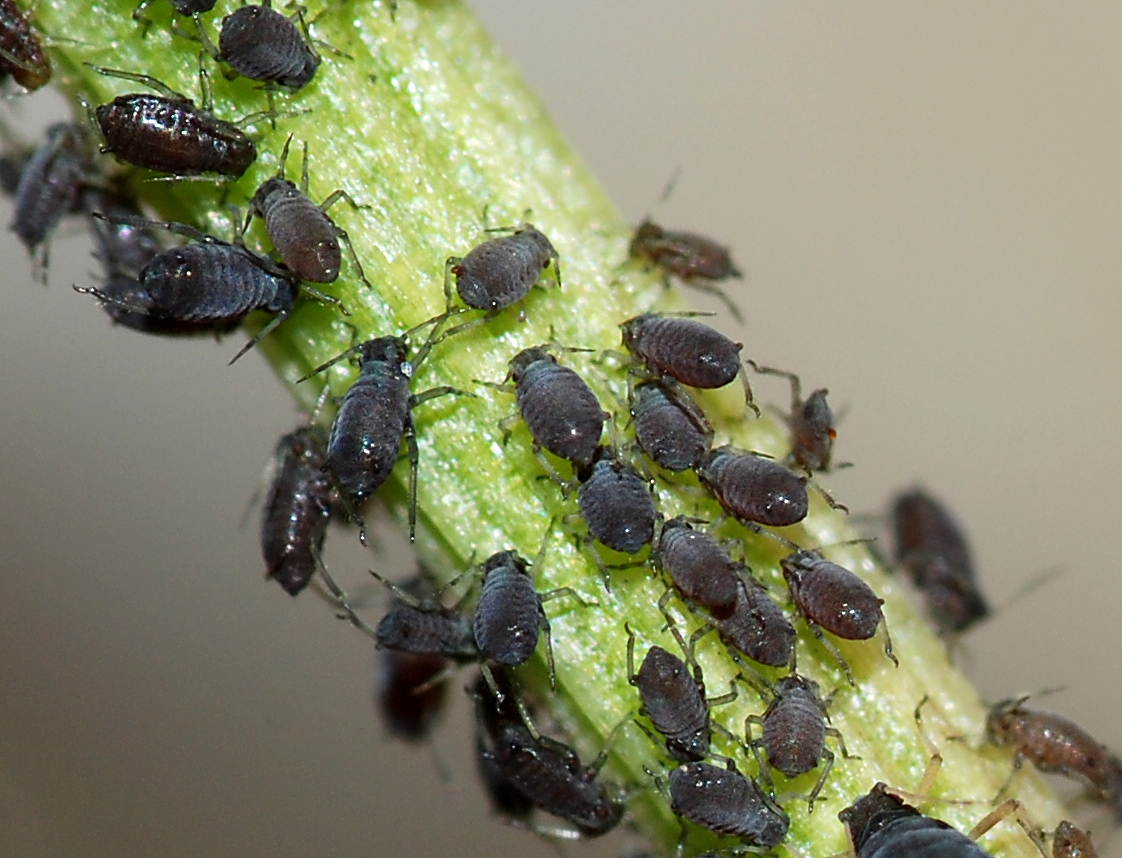
Wingless aphids feeding on a stem

The black bean aphid is a small, soft-bodied (meaning that the exocuticle part of the exoskeleton is greatly reduced) insect that has specialised piercing and sucking mouthparts which are used to suck the juice from plants. This aphid is usually seen in large numbers and is a tiny, plump insect about two millimetres long with a small head and bulbous abdomen. The body is blackish or dark green in colour. Many adults are devoid of wings, a state known as aptery. Winged forms, known as alates, are longer and more slender than aptates and have shiny black heads and thoraxes. The membranous wings of the alates are held angled over the body. The antennae are less than two-thirds of the length of the body and both they and the legs are pale yellow in colour with black tips. The tibiae of the hind legs are swollen in egg-laying females. Near the rear of the abdomen is a pair of slender, elongated tubes known as cornicles or siphunculi. Their function is the production of a defensive waxy secretion. They are twice as long as the finger-like tail and both are brownish-black.

== Life cycle ==
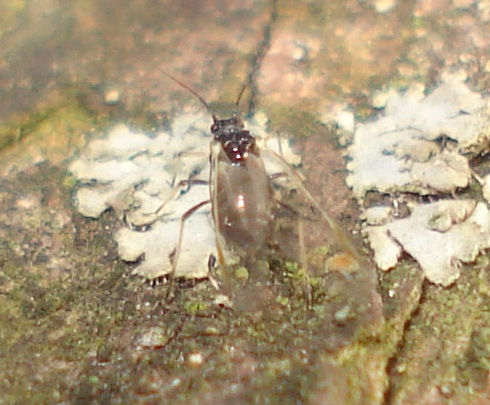
Winged adult

The black bean aphid has both sexual and asexual generations in its life cycle. It also alternates hosts at different times of year. The primary host plants are woody shrubs, and eggs are laid on these by winged females in the autumn. The adults then die and the eggs overwinter. The aphids that hatch from these eggs in the spring are wingless females known as stem mothers. These are able to reproduce asexually, giving birth to live offspring, nymphs, through parthenogenesis. The lifespan of a parthenogenetic female is about 50 days and during this period, each can produce as many as 30 young. The offspring are also females and able to reproduce without mating, but further generations are usually winged forms. These migrate to their secondary host plants, completely different species that are typically herbaceous plants with soft, young growth.

Further parthenogenesis takes place on these new hosts on the undersides of leaves and on the growing tips. All the offspring are female at this time of year and large populations of aphids develop rapidly with both winged and wingless forms produced throughout the summer. Winged individuals develop as a response to overcrowding and they disperse to new host plants and other crops. By midsummer, the number of predators and parasites has built up and aphid populations cease to expand. As autumn approaches, the winged forms migrate back to the primary host plants. Here, both males and sexual females are produced parthenogenetically, mating takes place, and these females lay eggs in crevices and under lichens to complete the lifecycle. Each female can lay six to ten black eggs which can survive temperatures as low as −32 °C (−26 °F). More than 40% of the eggs probably survive the winter, but some are eaten by birds or flower bugs, and others fail to hatch in the spring.

== Host plants ==
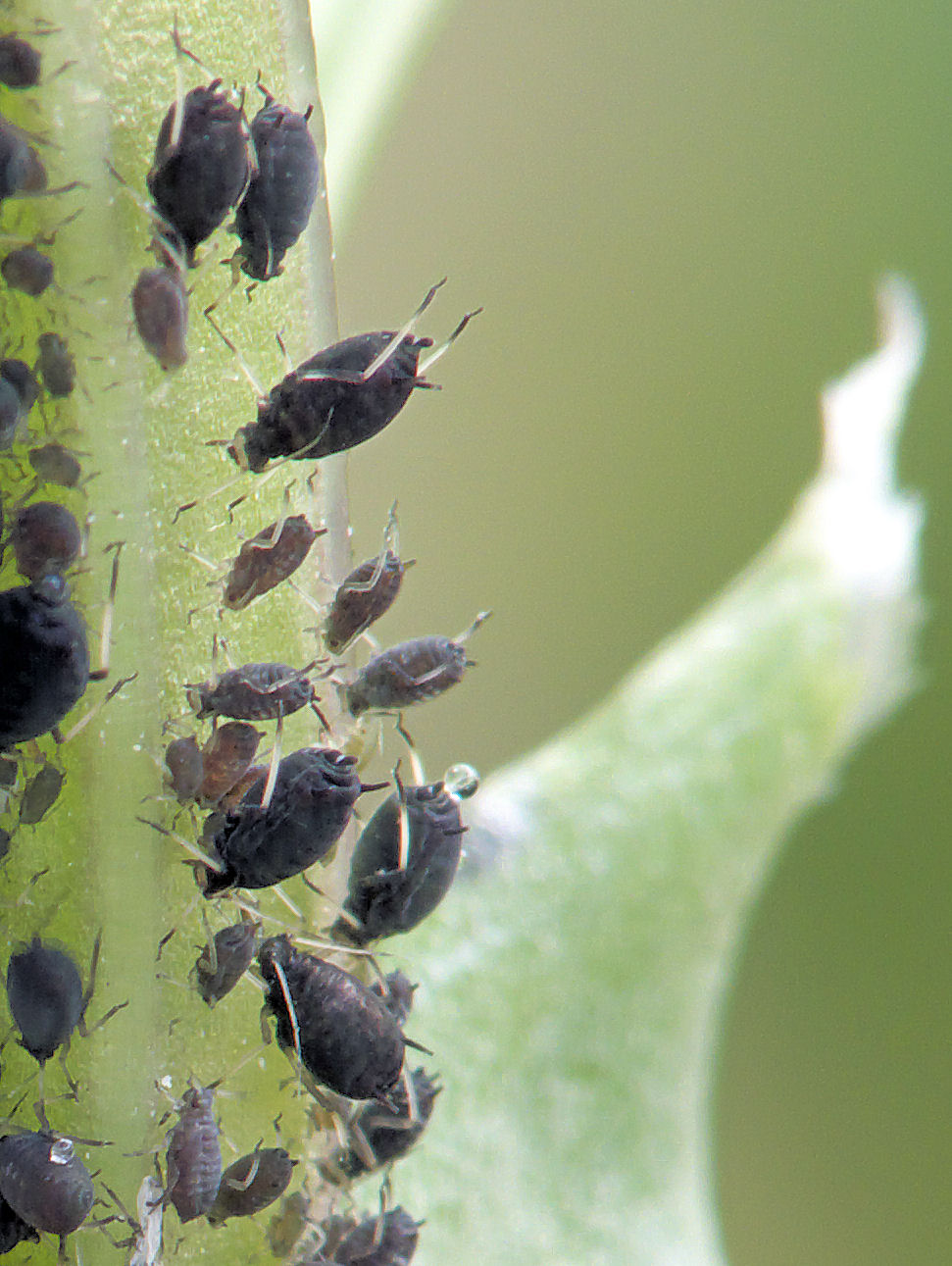
Aphids adopting a characteristic stance when feeding on a broad bean stalk

The black bean aphid can feed on a wide variety of host plants. Its primary hosts on which the eggs overwinter are shrubs such as the spindle tree (Euonymus europaeus), Viburnum species, or the mock-orange (Philadelphus species). Its secondary hosts, on which it spends the summer, include a number of crops including sugar beets, spinach, beans, runner beans, celery, potatoes, sunflowers, carrots, artichokes, tobacco, and tomatoes. It colonises more than 200 different species of cultivated and wild plants. Among the latter, it shows a preference for poppies (Papaver species), burdock (Arctium tomentonum), fat-hen (Chenopodium album), saltbush (Atriplex rosea), chamomile (Matricaria chamomilla), thistles (Cirsium arvense), and docks (Rumex spp.).

Two conflicting factors are involved in host preferences, the species and the age of the leaf. Offered spindle and beet leaves on growing plants throughout the year, winged aphids moved from one to the other depending on the active growth state of each and the senescence of each host plant. Thus, in late summer and autumn, the beet leaves were old and unattractive to the aphids in comparison with the leaves of the spindle, whereas in spring, the young unfolding leaves of the beet were more attractive than those of the spindle.

== Damage ==
The black bean aphid is a major pest of sugar beet, bean, and celery crops, with large numbers of aphids cause stunting of the plants. Beans suffer damage to flowers and pods which may not develop properly. Early-sown crops may avoid significant damage if they have already flowered before the number of aphids builds up in the spring. Celery can be heavily infested. The plants are stunted by the removal of sap, the stems are distorted, harmful viruses are transmitted, and aphid residues may contaminate the crop. As a result of infestation by this aphid, leaves of sugar beet become swollen, roll, and cease developing. The roots grow poorly and the sugar content is reduced. In some other plants, the leaves do not become distorted, but growth is affected and flowers abort due to the action of the toxic saliva injected by the aphid to improve the flow of sap.

To obtain enough protein, aphids need to suck large volumes of sap. The excess sugary fluid, honeydew, is secreted by the aphids. It adheres to plants, where it promotes growth of sooty molds. These are unsightly, reduce the surface area of the plant available for photosynthesis and may reduce the value of the crop. These aphids are also the vectors of about 30 plant viruses, mostly of the nonpersistent variety. The aphids may not be the original source of infection, but are instrumental in spreading the virus through the crop. Various chemical treatments are available to kill the aphids and organic growers can use a solution of soft soap.

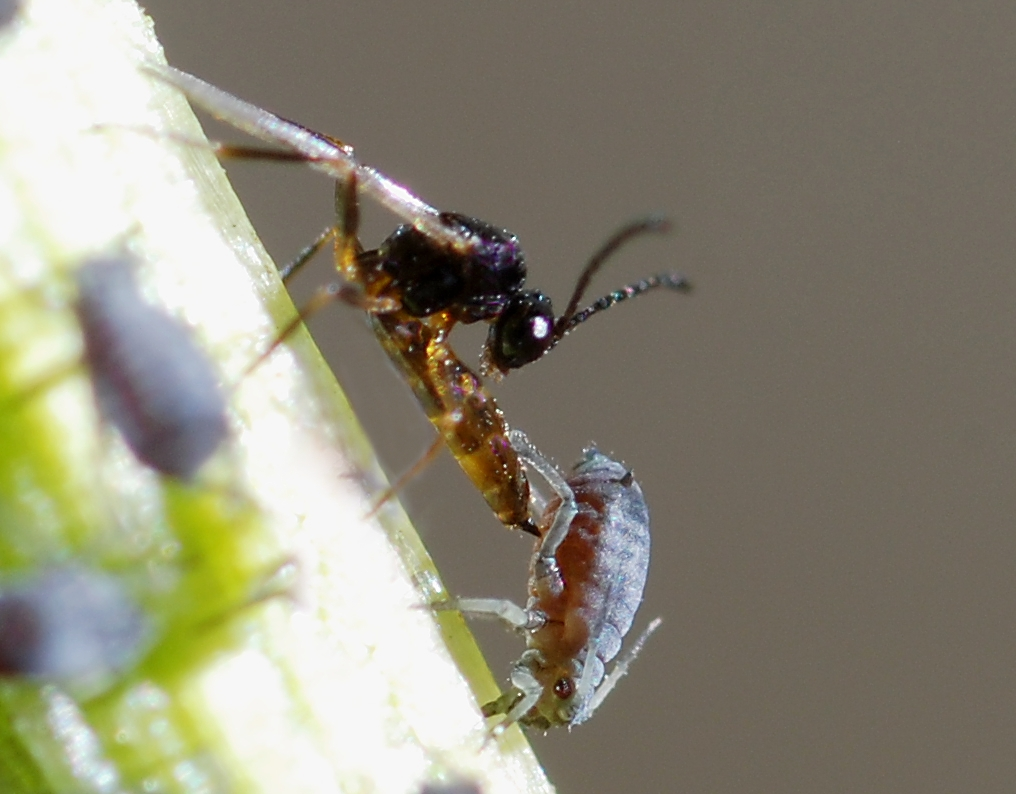
Wasp laying egg inside an aphid's body

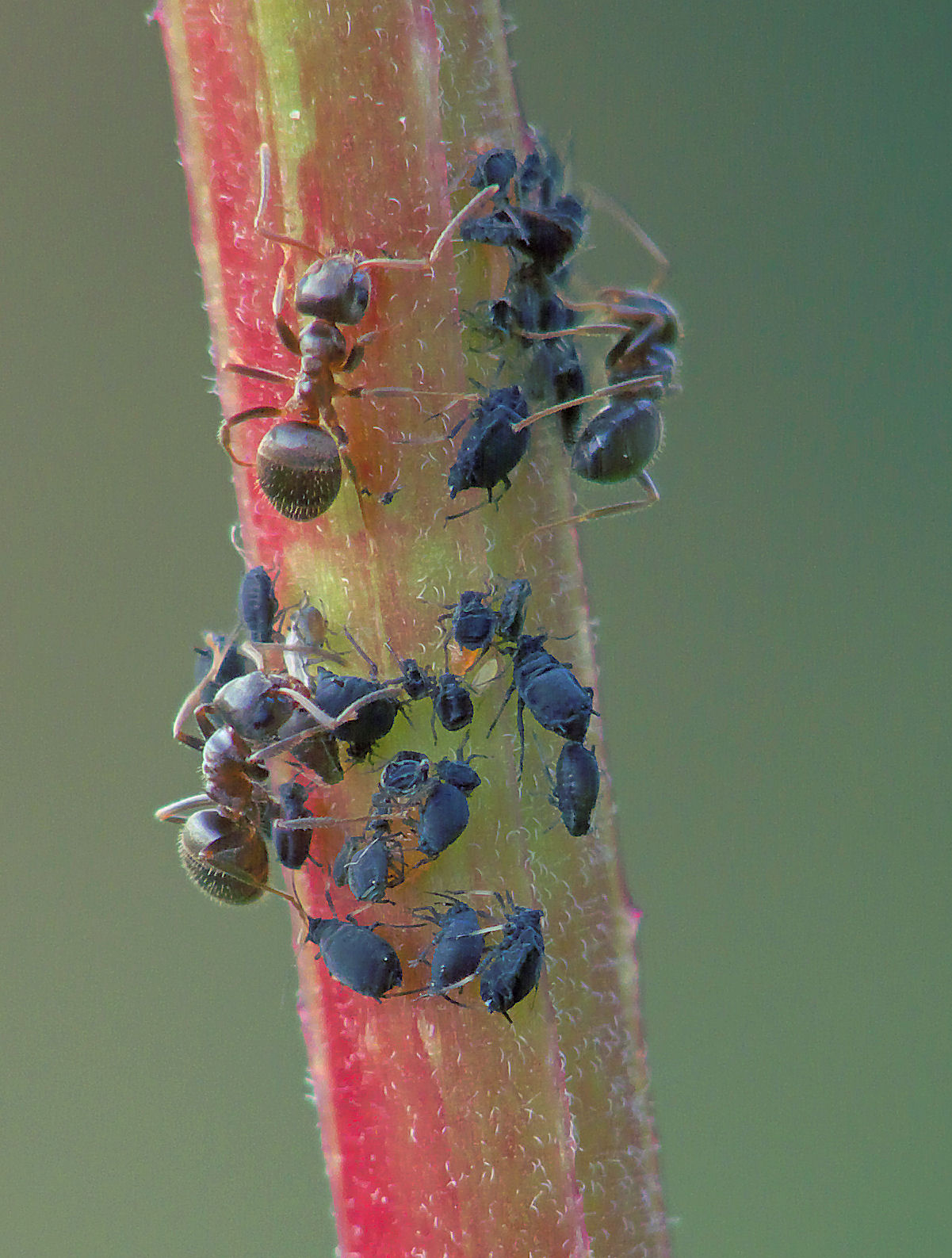
Aphids tended by ants

== Ecology ==
Natural predators of black bean aphids include both adults and larvae of ladybirds and lacewings and the larvae of hoverflies. Certain species of tiny parasitic wasps lay their eggs inside aphids and the developing wasp larvae devour their hosts from inside. Members of the wasp genera Diaeretiella and Lysiphlebus behave in this way and may provide a measure of control of the aphids.

Ants climb the host plants and feed on the honeydew secreted by the aphids. Many species of ants have developed behaviours to enable them to protect and encourage their aphids. Black garden ants (Lasius niger), for example, remove predators such as ladybirds from the vicinity of aphids, thus keeping their "milk cows" safe. On a test plot of field beans (Vicia faba), plants without black bean aphids yielded an average of 56 seeds per plant, those with aphids and no ants yielded 17 seeds, and those with both ants and aphids averaged only 8 seeds per plant.

== Distribution ==
The black bean aphid may have originated in Europe and Asia, but it is now one of the most widely distributed species of aphids. It is found throughout temperate areas of Western Europe, Asia, and North America and in the cooler parts of Africa, the Middle East, and South America. In the warmer parts of its range, apterous individuals can survive the winter and they may continue to reproduce asexually all year round. It is known to be migratory.
