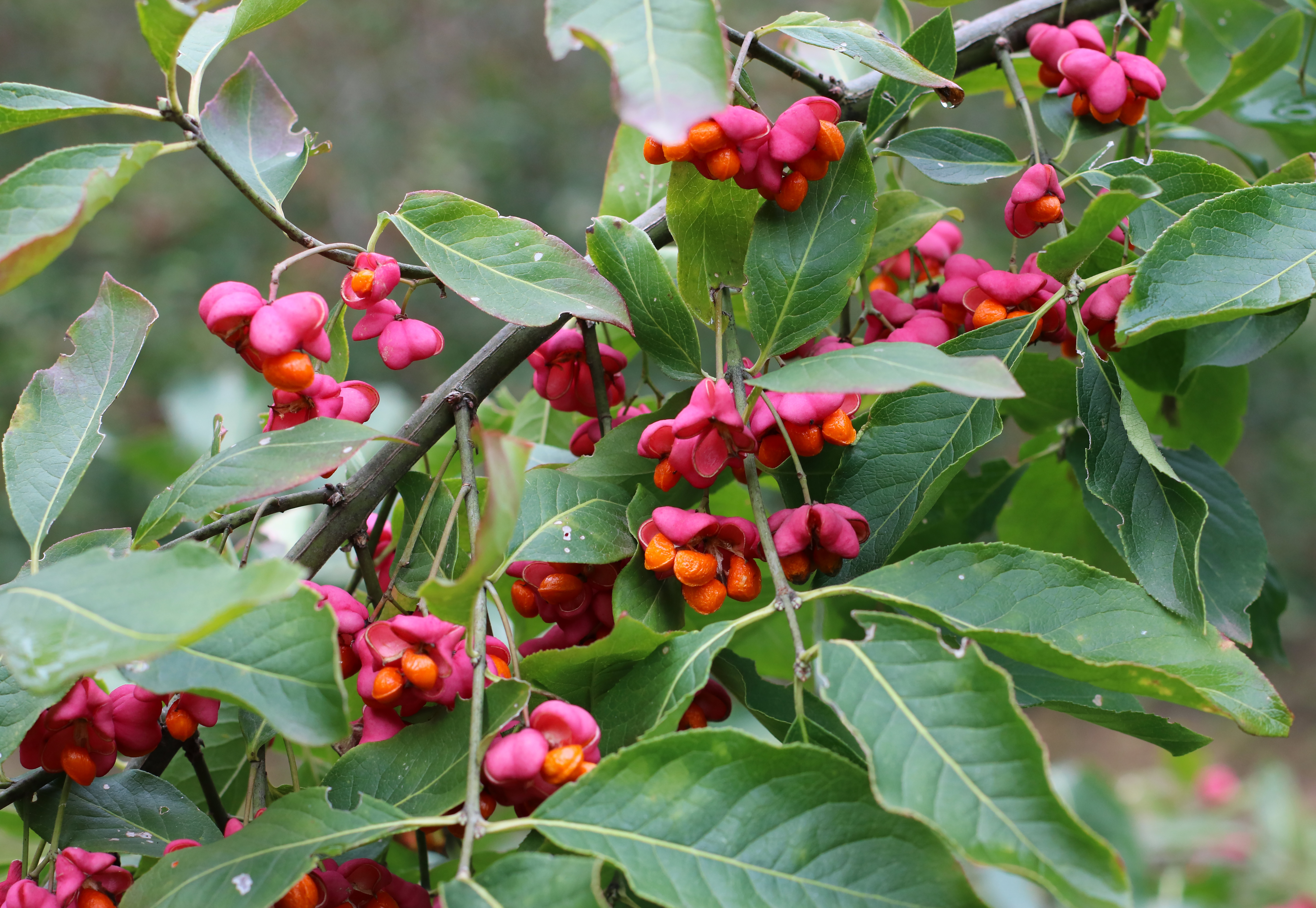

Conservation status
- Least Concern (IUCN 3.1)

Scientific classification
- Kingdom: Plantae
- Clade: Tracheophytes
- Clade: Angiosperms
- Clade: Eudicots
- Clade: Rosids
- Order: Celastrales
- Family: Celastraceae
- Genus: Euonymus
- Species: E. europaeus

Binomial name
- Euonymus europaeus L.
- Distribution map

Synonyms
- List: Euonymus multiflorus Opiz ex Bercht. [1838]; Euonymus floribundus Steven [1856]; Euonymus europaeus var. macrophyllus Rchb.; Euonymus europaeus var. intermedius Gaudin; Euonymus bulgaricus Velen. [1891]; Euonymus vulgaris Mill. [1768]; Euonymus angustifolius Clairv [1811]

= Euonymus europaeus =

Species of flowering plant

Euonymus europaeus, the spindle, European spindle, or common spindle, is a species of flowering plant in the family Celastraceae, native to much of Europe, where it inhabits the edges of forest, hedges and gentle slopes, tending to thrive on nutrient-rich, chalky and salt-poor soils. It is a deciduous shrub or small tree.

== Description ==
Euonymus europaeus grows to 3–6 m (10–20 ft) tall, rarely 10 m (33 ft), with a stem up to 20 cm (8 in) in diameter. The leaves are opposite, lanceolate to elliptical, 3–8 cm long and 1–3 cm broad, with a finely serrated edge. The base is cuneate. Leaves are dark green in summer. Autumn colour ranges from yellow-green to reddish-purple, depending on environmental conditions.

The hermaphrodite flowers are produced in late spring and are insect-pollinated. They are rather inconspicuous and small with yellowish-green petals, and grow in cymes of 3–8 together. The capsular fruit ripens in autumn, and is red to purple or pink in colour and approximately 1–1.5 cm wide. When ripe, the four lobes split open to reveal the orange seeds.

== Habitat and ecology ==
E. europaeus occurs as an understorey shrub or small tree primarily in old hedgerows, open woodland clearings and margins, and scrubland on base-rich or calcareous soils. However, it is also shade-tolerant. It rarely invades open habitats such as grasslands unless abundant hedges are present In Ireland, it can also be found growing on rocky limestone outcrops, rocky lake shores and limestone pavements.

It is typical in Fraxinus excelsior – Acer campestre – Mercurialis perennis woodland (W8), and it is a frequent companion of Cornus sanguinea in open-stand scrub over limestone, generally in low frequency and abundance throughout. Its distribution is usually scattered, but it may occasionally occur remarkably commonly on a local scale. An example of this is in the so-called "Spindle Valley" in the Chilterns. The scattered distribution is likely limited by dispersal of seeds via birds and rodents.

E. europaeus is the almost exclusive winter host of the black bean aphid. Because of the potential economic loss from this insect that feeds on cultivated broad beans and sugar beet, spindle in the past was commonly removed from hedges and woodlands as a measure against black bean aphid outbreaks and agricultural yield losses, although this widespread removal does not appear to have impacted current populations. In 1944, The Biology War Committee also began a campaign to investigate the distribution and ecology of E. europeaus as a basis for aphid control measures.

== Cultivation and uses ==
It is a popular ornamental plant in gardens and parks due to its bright pink or purple fruits and attractive autumn colouring.

In cultivation in the UK, the cultivar 'Red Cascade' has gained the Royal Horticultural Society's Award of Garden Merit.

European spindle wood is very hard, and can be cut to a sharp point. In the past it was used to make spindles for spinning wool and for butchers' skewers.

Charcoal produced from this plant is held in high esteem among artists for its exceptional strength and density.

Parts of the plant have been used for medicinal purposes. However, the fruit is poisonous and contains several toxic substances, including the alkaloids theobromine and caffeine, as well as a large number of much more toxic substances, including cardiac glycosides, and an extremely bitter terpene. Poisoning is more common in young children, who are attracted to the brightly coloured fruits. Ingesting them can result in liver and kidney damage, or even death.

== Gallery ==
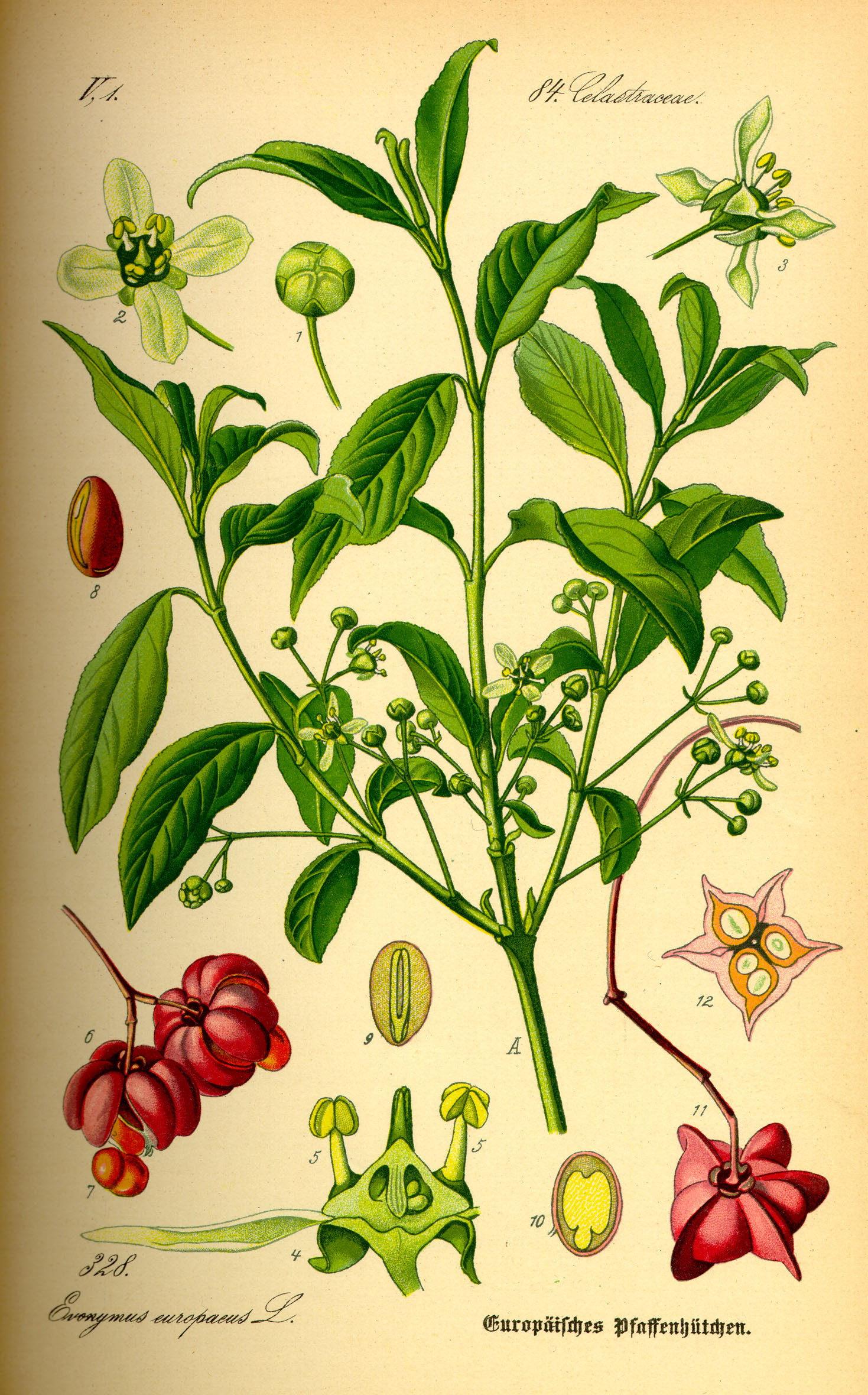
1885 illustration by Otto Wilhelm Thomé

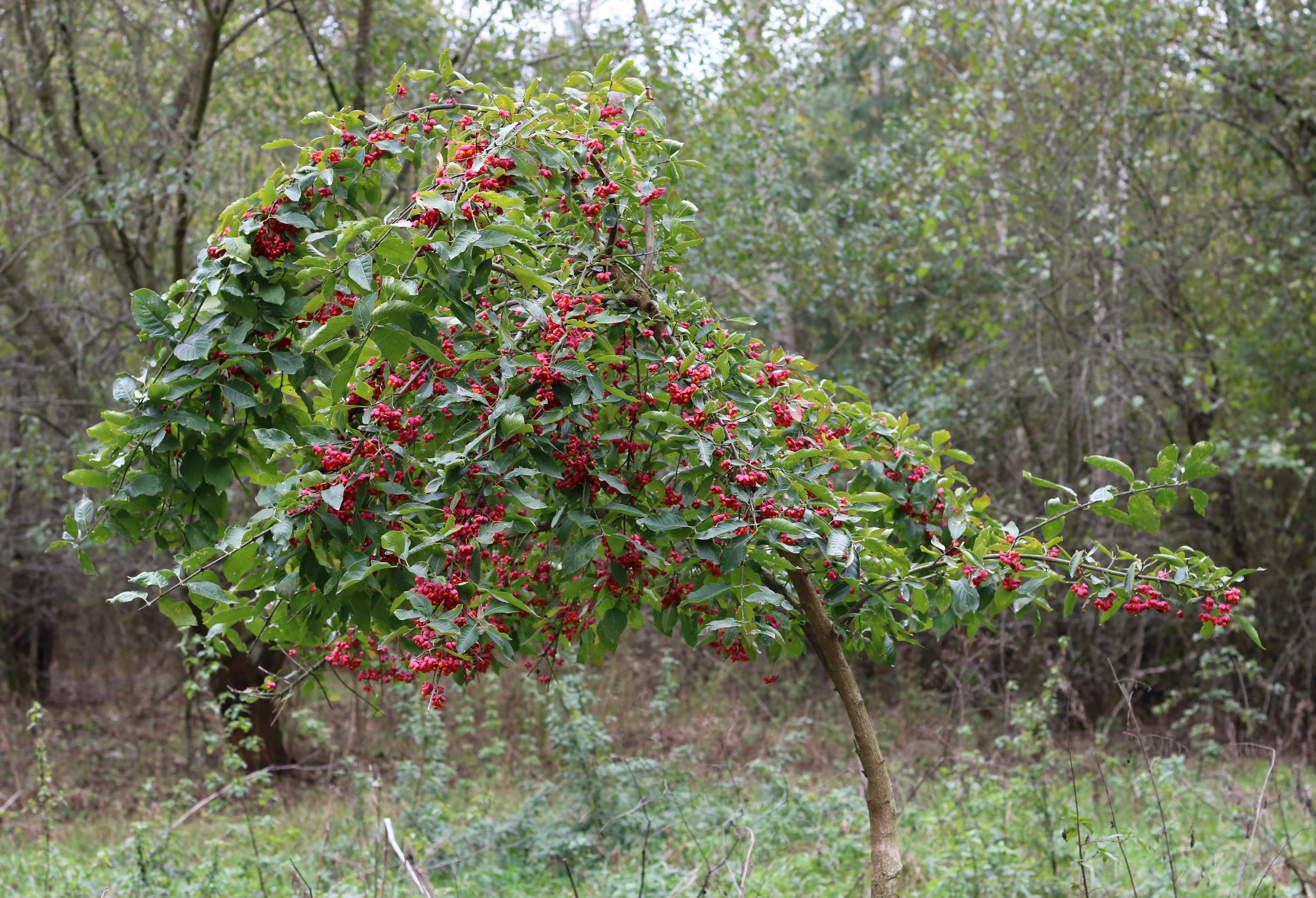
Whole plant in autumn with leaves and fruits

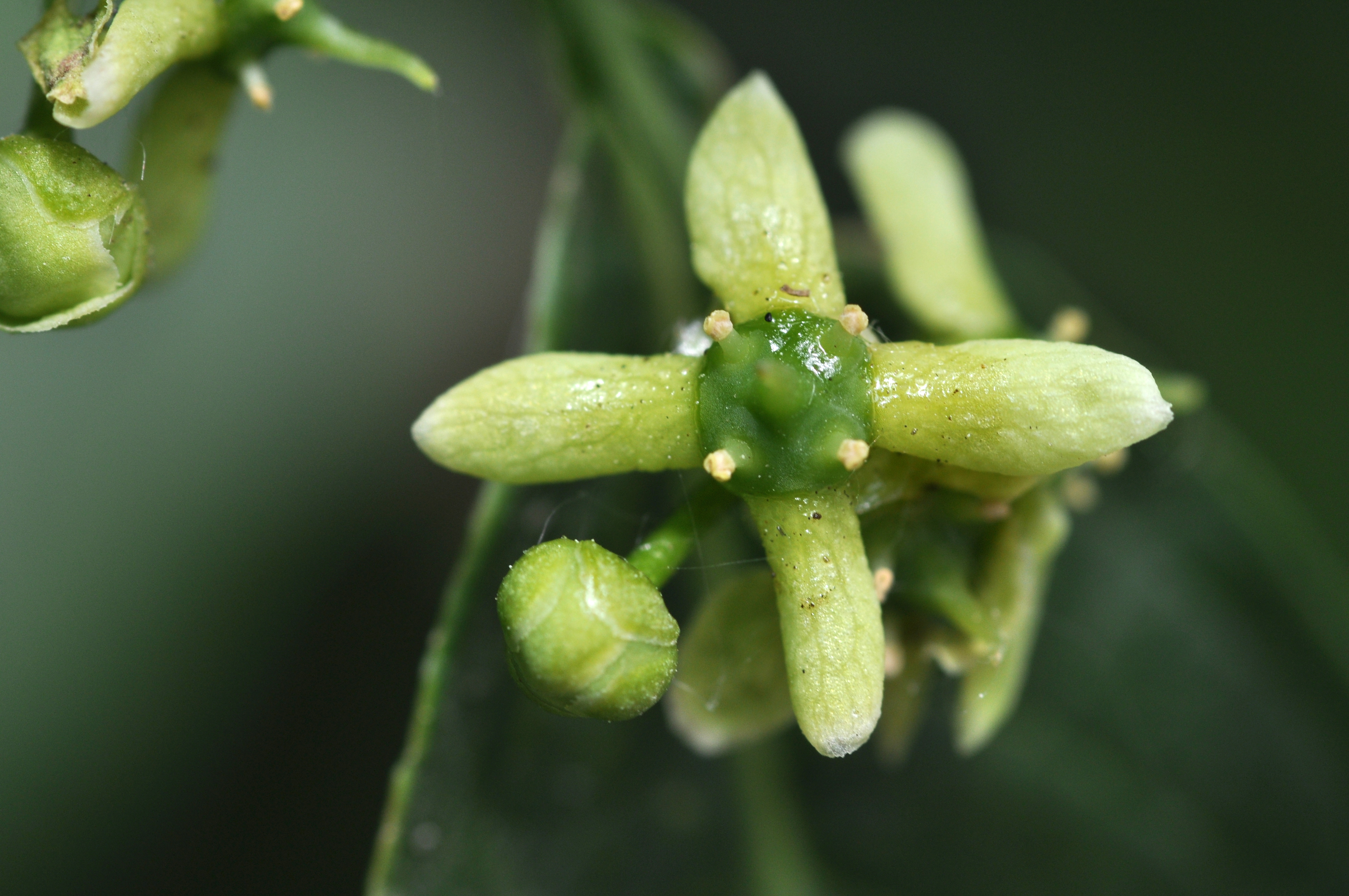
Flower with the four petals and four stamens

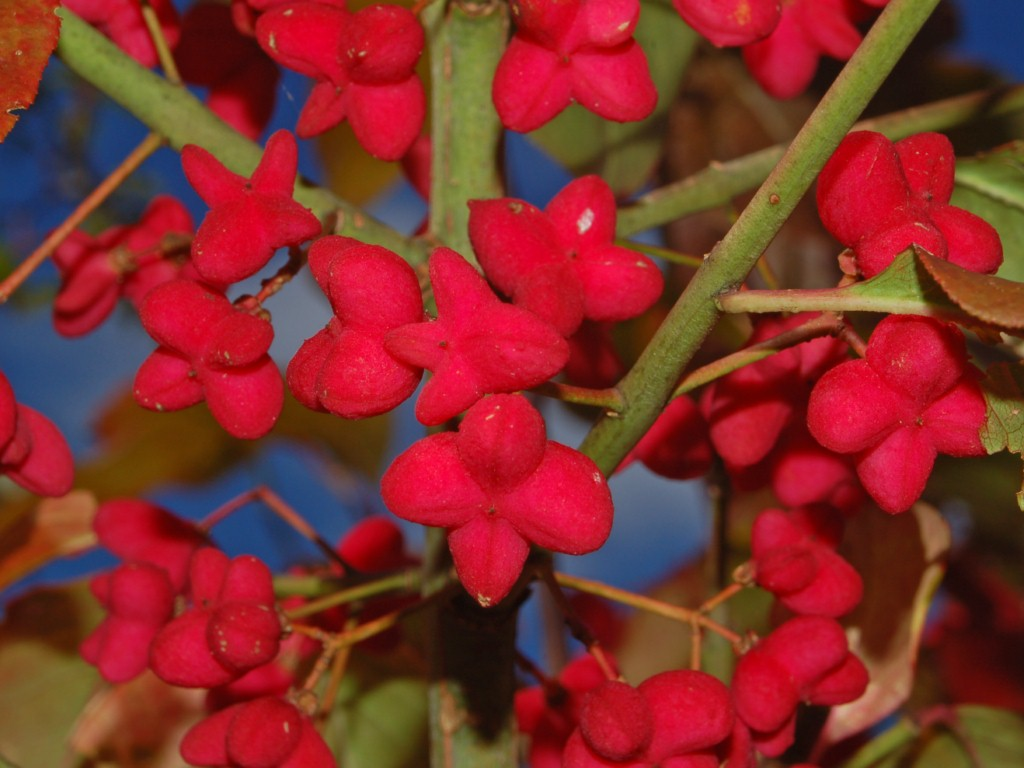
Fruits

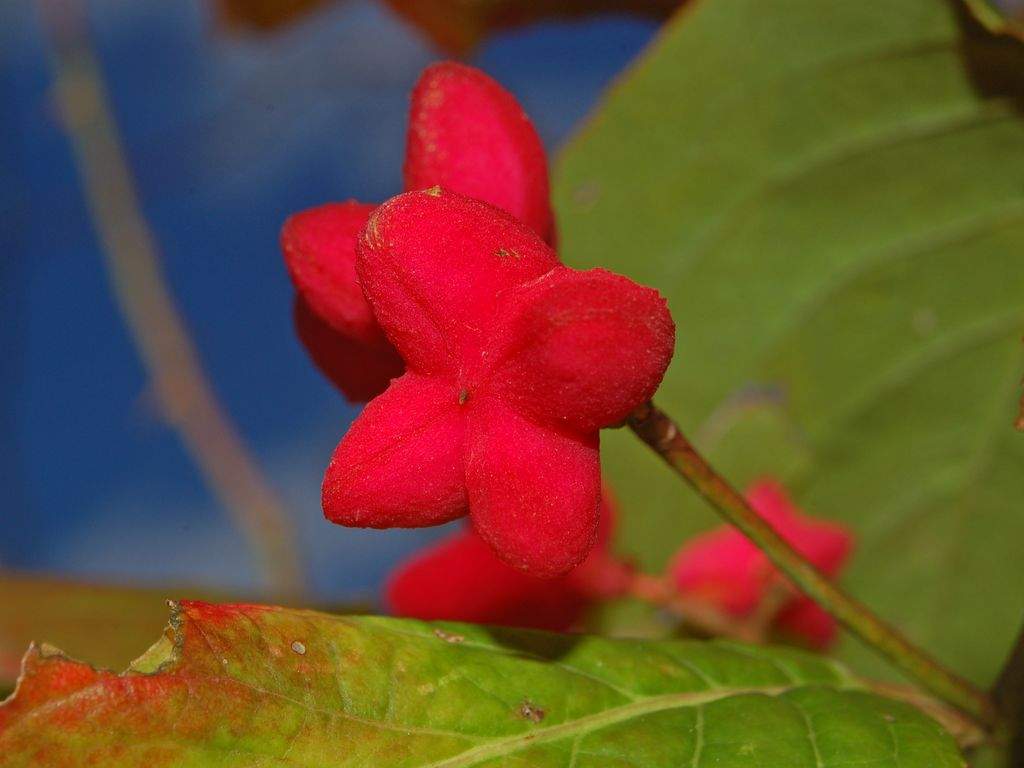
Close-up of a fruit

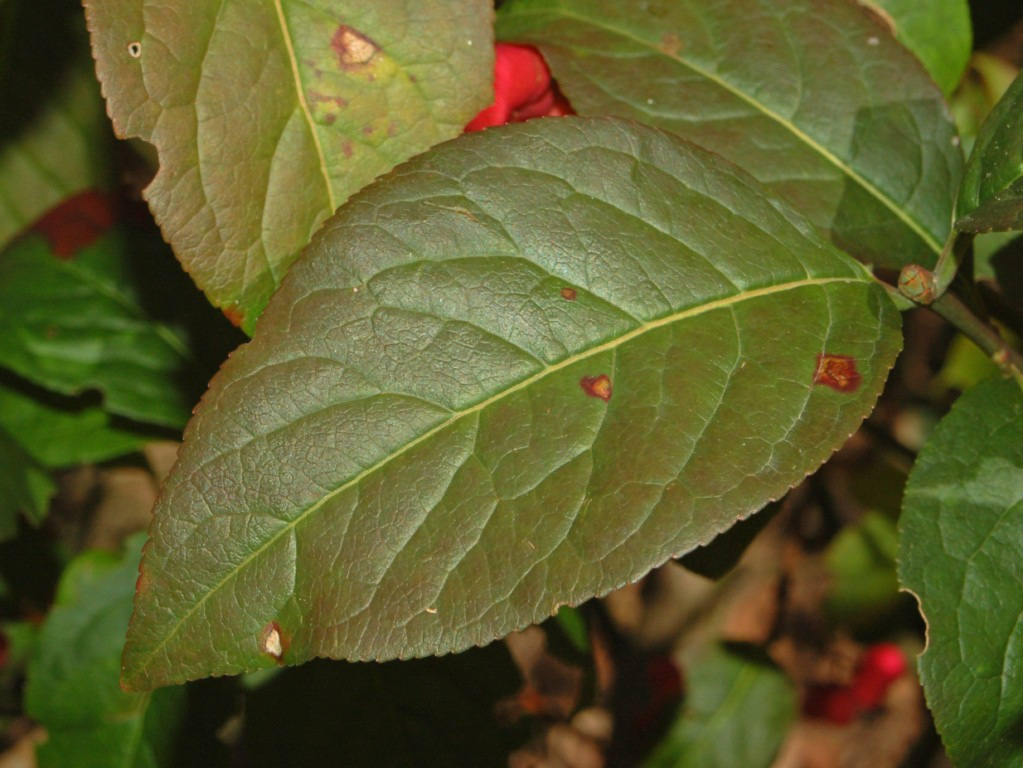
Leaf

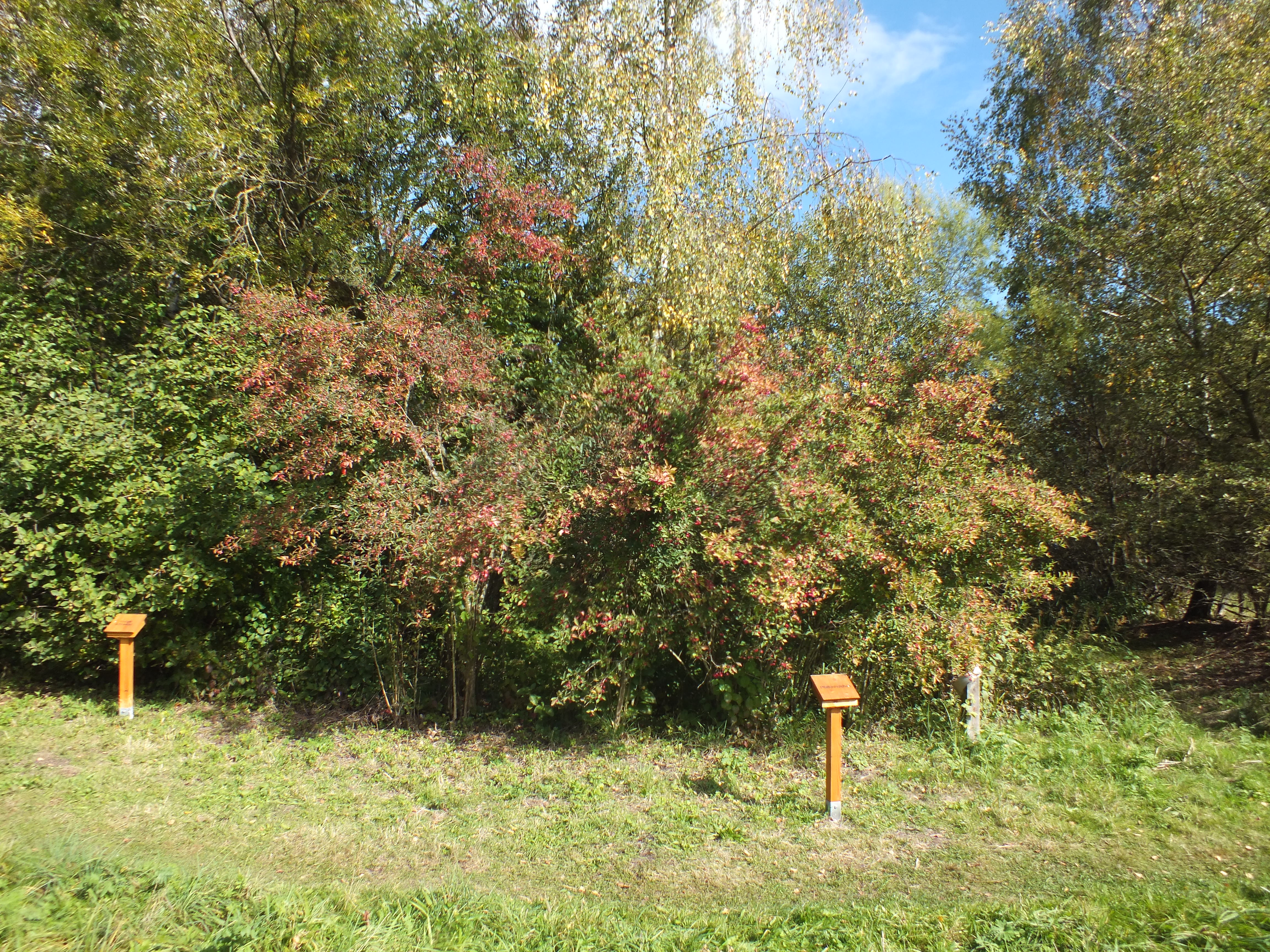

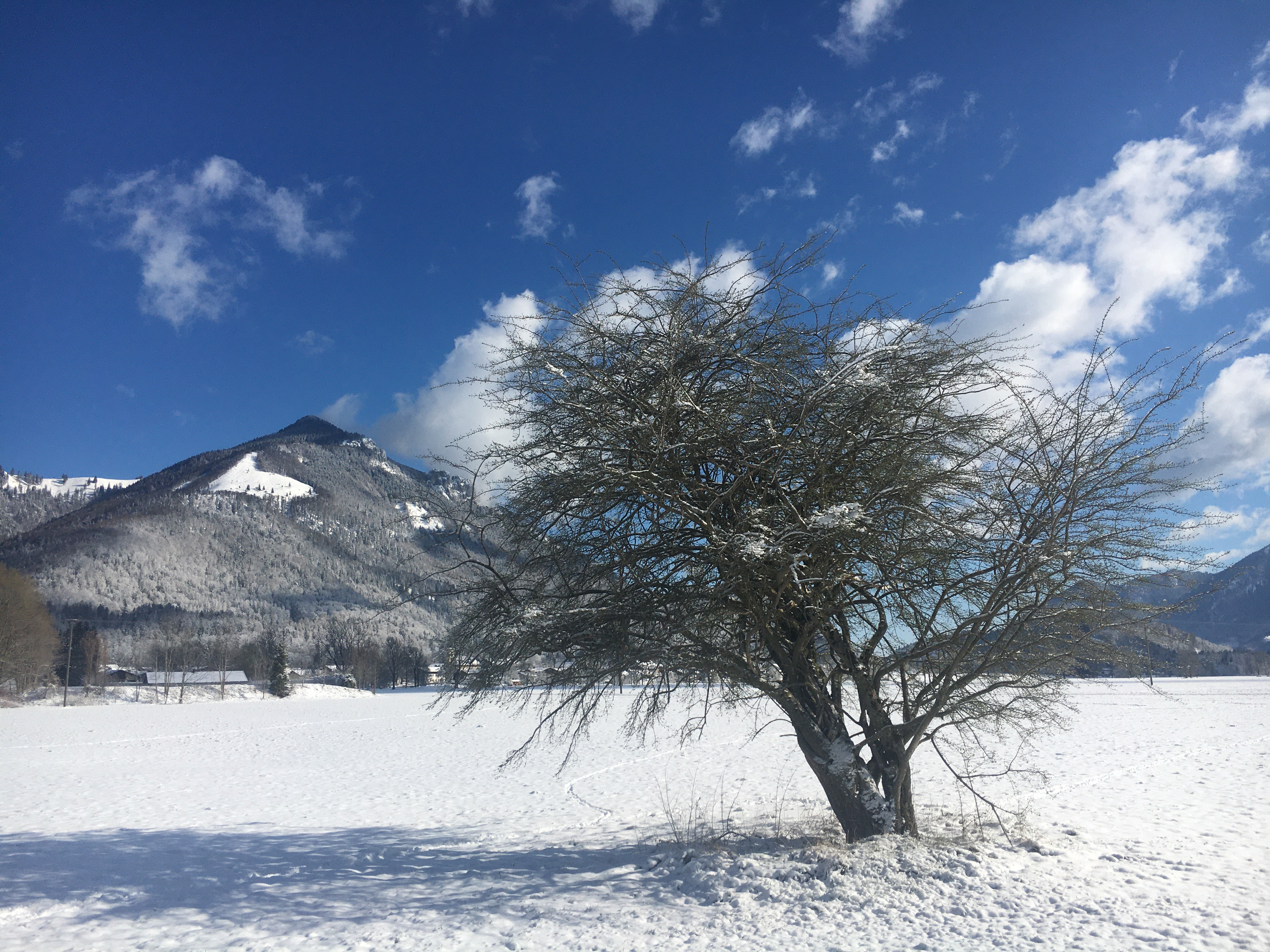
Alpine habitus of a very old specimen
