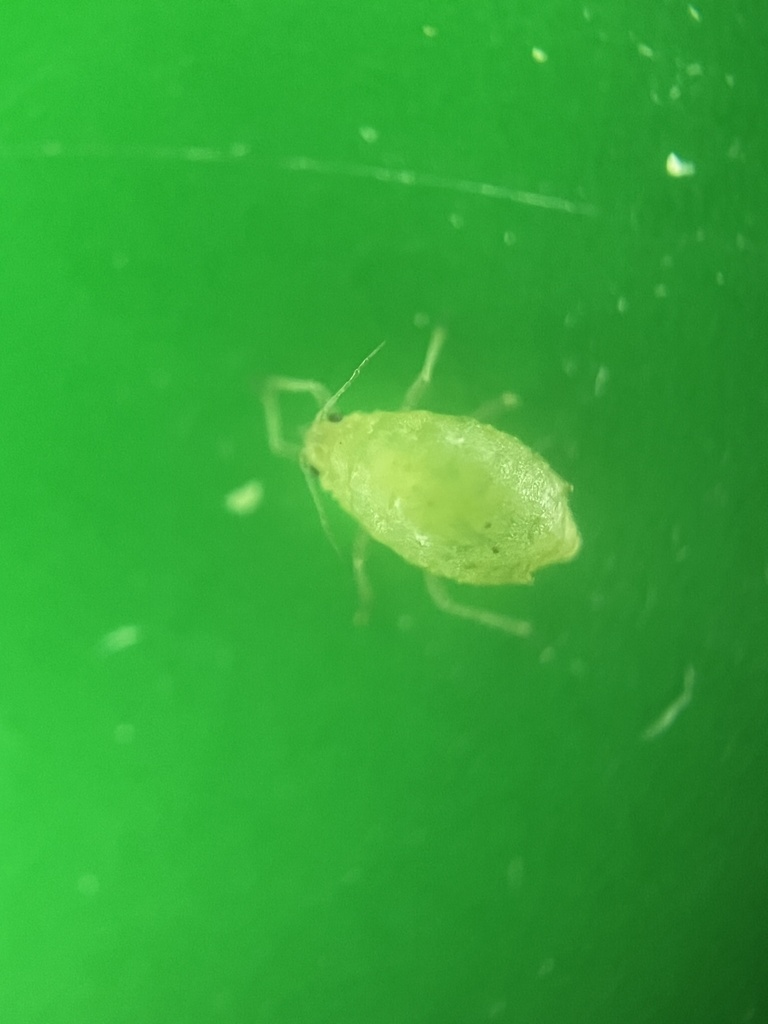

Scientific classification
- Kingdom: Animalia
- Phylum: Arthropoda
- Class: Insecta
- Order: Hemiptera
- Suborder: Sternorrhyncha
- Family: Aphididae
- Genus: Brachycaudus
- Species: B. rumexicolens

Binomial name
- Brachycaudus rumexicolens (Patch, 1917)

= Brachycaudus rumexicolens =

Species of aphid

Brachycaudus rumexicolens, the short tailed sorrel aphid, is an aphid in the genus Brachycaudus that feeds on Polygonaceae, and ranges almost completely worldwide minus Antarctica.

== Host plants ==
this aphid is found primarily on Rumex species in the United States, but can also be found on many other plants in the Polygonaceae.

== Recent introductions ==
This species was introduced to Australia in 1998 where it has been used to wipe out a nonnative dock species.

== Color forms ==
This species has two color forms, the North American color form is yellowish green, while the other ones worldwide are brown in coloration.

== Appearance ==
The other defining features are that it is the size of a pinhead, has small, multi segmented, antenna, and short siphuncui (which is why its called short tailed).
