= Aphis nasturtii =

Scientific classification
- Domain: Eukaryota
- Kingdom: Animalia
- Phylum: Arthropoda
- Class: Insecta
- Order: Hemiptera
- Suborder: Sternorrhyncha
- Family: Aphididae
- Genus: Aphis
- Species: A. nasturtii

Binomial name
- Aphis nasturtii Kaltenbach, 1843

Species of true bug

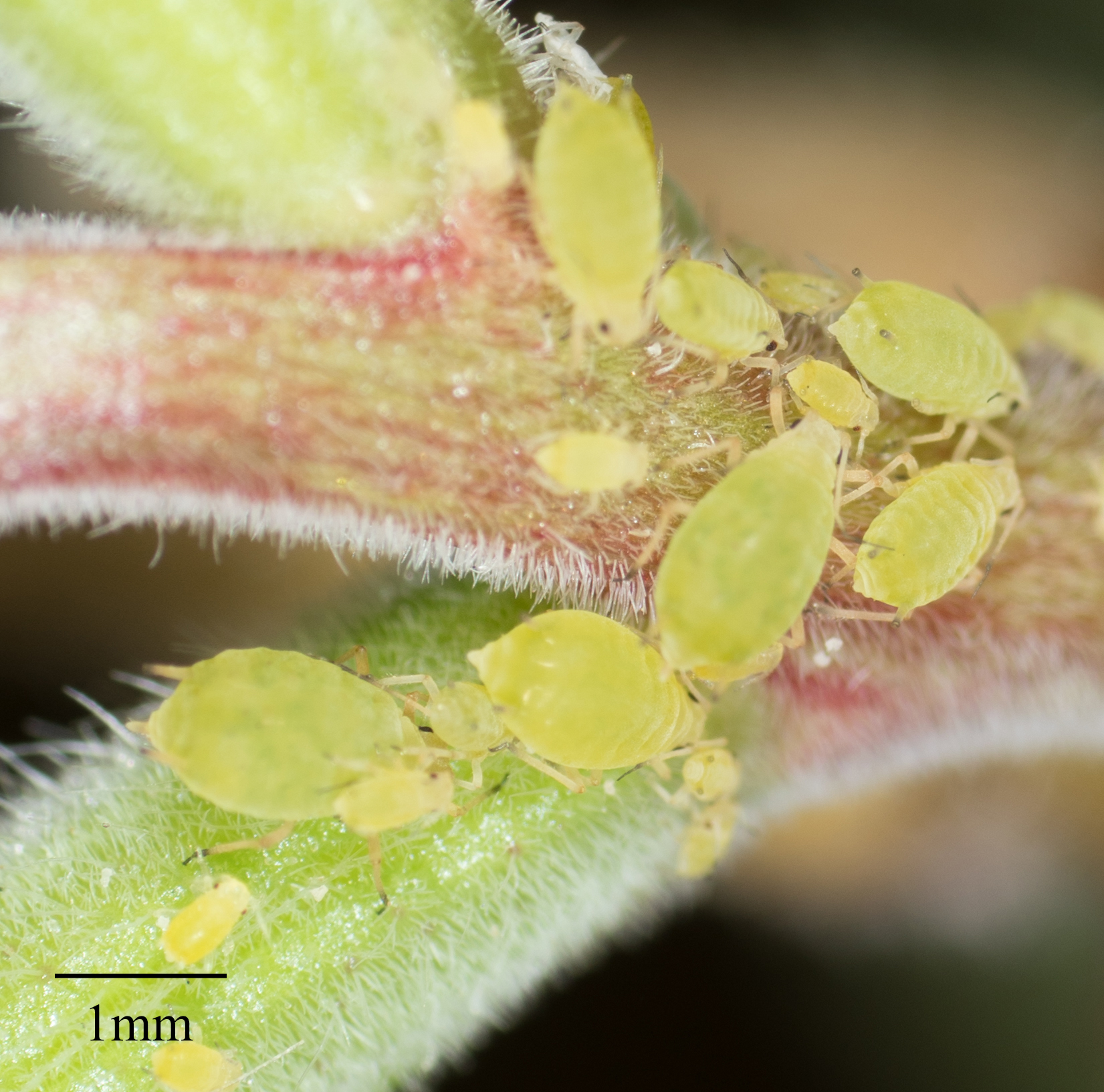

Aphis nasturtii, the buckthorn aphid or buckthorn-potato aphid, is an aphid in the superfamily Aphidoidea in the order Hemiptera. It is a true bug and sucks sap from plants. It is a cosmopolitan species.

== Economic importance ==
It is known to be a major insect pest on sunflower plants, lettuce, potato, beets, and buckthorn. The aphid is also act as a vector to 15 plant viruses.
