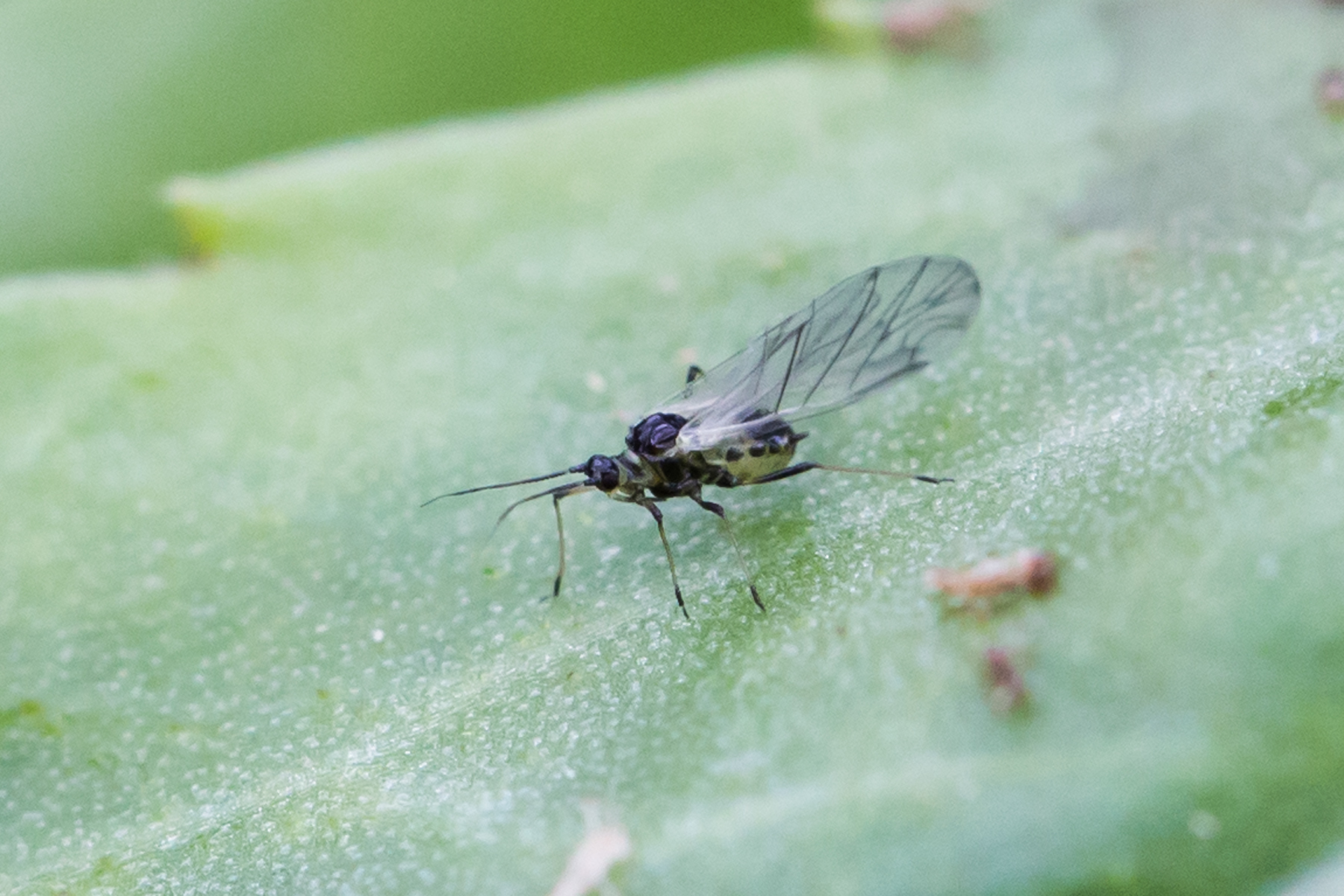
- Brachycaudus helichrysi, Pennsylvania

Scientific classification
- Domain: Eukaryota
- Kingdom: Animalia
- Phylum: Arthropoda
- Class: Insecta
- Order: Hemiptera
- Suborder: Sternorrhyncha
- Family: Aphididae
- Subfamily: Aphidinae
- Tribe: Macrosiphini
- Genus: Brachycaudus
- Species: B. helichrysi

Binomial name
- Brachycaudus helichrysi (Kaltenbach, 1843)

Synonyms
- Brachycaudus helichrysi (Kaltenbach, 1843)

= Brachycaudus helichrysi =

Species of true bug

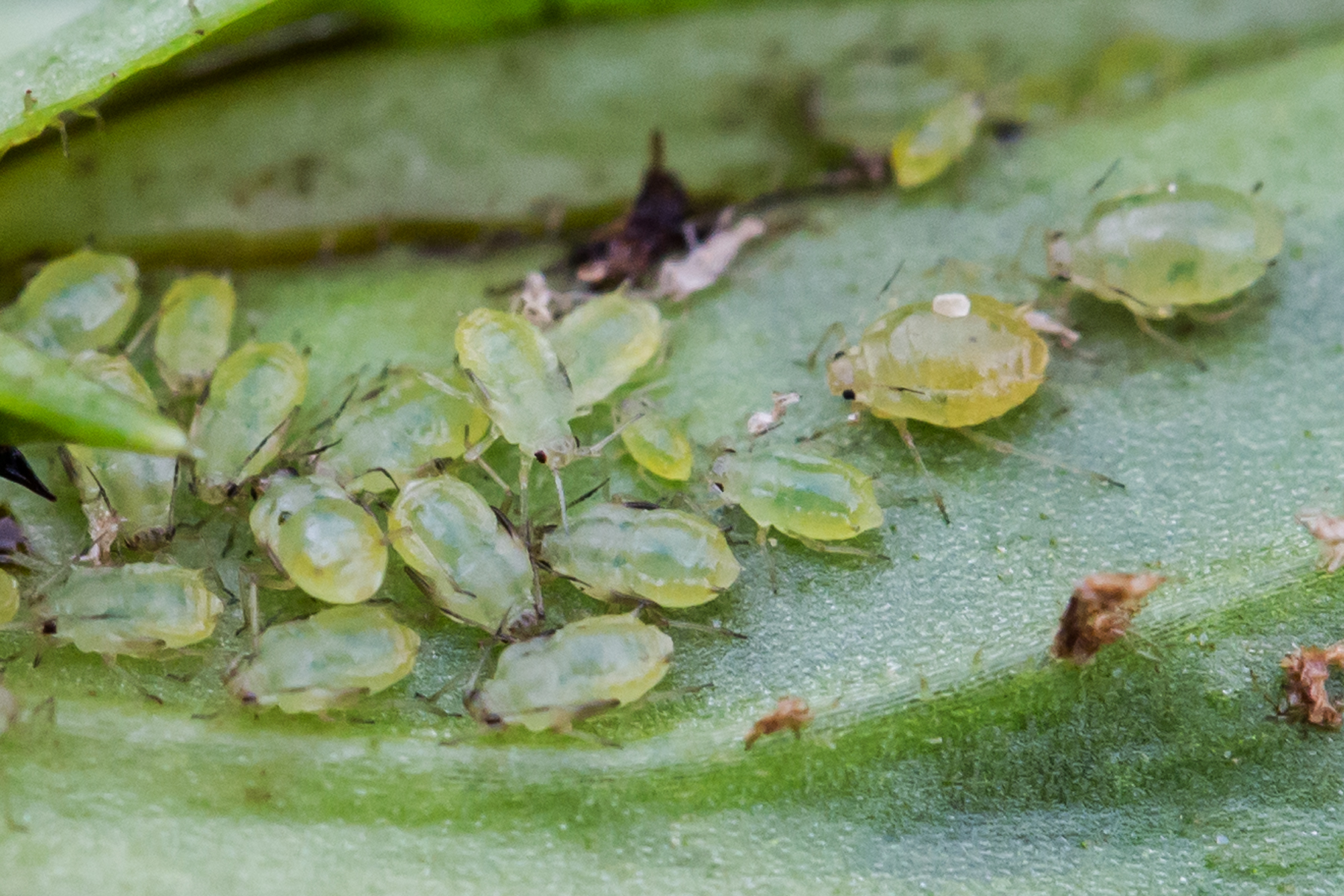
Brachycaudus helichrysi, Pennsylvania

Brachycaudus helichrysi is a species of aphid first described by the German naturalist Johann Heinrich Kaltenbach in 1843. Its common names include leaf curl plum aphid, and leaf-curling plum aphid, and it is a serious pest of plum and damson trees.

== Description ==
The viviparous wingless females have an oval or pear-shaped body and grow to a length of up to 2 mm (0.08 in). Early in the season they are brownish but later they are yellowish-green. The antennae are pale green and short, about half the length of the body. There is no dark, shining patch on the dorsal surface of the abdomen, a fact which distinguishes it from the otherwise similar thistle aphid (Brachycaudus cardui). The cauda (tail-like elongation) is bluntly rounded, the legs are pale except for the extremities, and the cornicles are pale-coloured, short and flanged. Winged females range from 1.3 to 1.8 mm (0.05 to 0.07 in) in length and have a blackish head with longer antennae, blackish thorax and a green abdomen with dark spots on the third to sixth segments. The overwintering eggs are black.

== Biology ==
Brachycaudus helichrysi overwinters as fertilised eggs which hatch during the winter or early spring, before the plum and damson trees on which they are laid come into leaf. The fundatrices (viviparous parthenogenetic females produced on the primary host) feed at first at the base of buds but as the buds begin to expand, they move on to softer tissues, and later on to the new shoots and underside of the foliage. By May, some winged forms are beginning to appear and these fly to secondary hosts, such as Asteraceae, Chrysanthemum and Trifolium, where they found new colonies. The colonies on the primary host gradually die out. Further generations develop on the secondary hosts and in the autumn, winged forms fly back to the primary host. Here sexual forms develop, mating takes place and eggs are laid on twigs and spurs of the plum and damson trees. Natural enemies include ladybirds, lacewings, soldier beetles and hoverflies.

== Damage ==
Brachycaudus helichrysi is a serious pest of stone fruits. It forms dense colonies on the underside of the leaves of the primary host causing curling, twisting and distortion of the foliage, the shedding of flowers and the dropping of young fruit. It is one of several species of aphid that can transmit the virus that causes plum pox.
