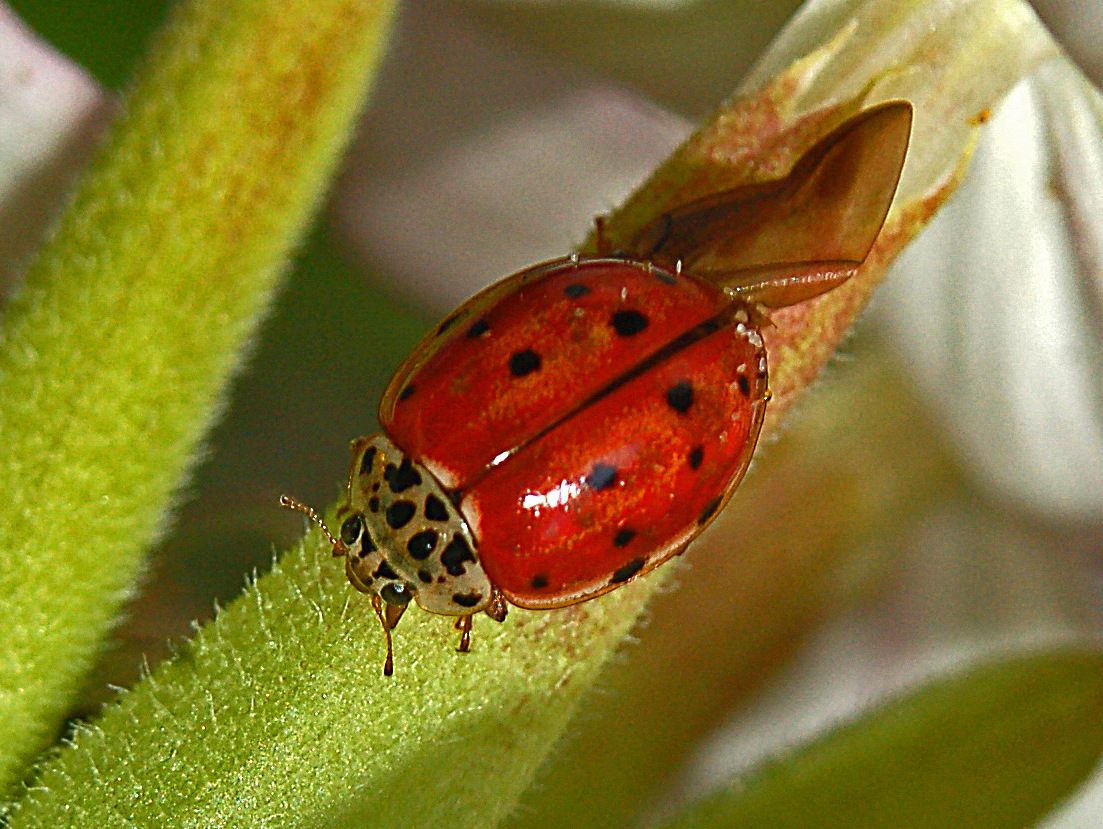

Scientific classification
- Kingdom: Animalia
- Phylum: Arthropoda
- Clade: Pancrustacea
- Class: Insecta
- Order: Coleoptera
- Suborder: Polyphaga
- Infraorder: Cucujiformia
- Family: Coccinellidae
- Genus: Harmonia
- Species: H. quadripunctata

Binomial name
- Harmonia quadripunctata (Pontoppidan, 1763)

Synonyms
- Coccinella quadripunctata Pontoppidan, 1763; Harmonia marginepunctata Schaller

= Harmonia quadripunctata =

Species of beetle

Harmonia quadripunctata, the cream-streaked lady beetle or four-spot ladybird, is a species of ladybird belonging to the family Coccinellidae.

== Description ==
Harmonia quadripunctata is a large Coccinellid with a length of 5.5–6 millimetres (0.22–0.24 in). The colouration is highly variable. The species is typically bright red, brown or yellow, although some individuals with greatly expanded dark patches appear almost completely black. The common name "cream-streaked" is in reference to the vertical pale lines present on many individuals. Although the base pattern consists of 18 black spots, many individuals do not show all 18 markings. The 2 marginal spots on each elytron frequently show even in the lightest marked individuals, hence the species epithet quadripunctata.

The pronotum is not very variable, with a consistent pattern of 11 markings, 5 of which are large and bold. The underside of H5 is dark with orange-brown sides, as in most Harmonia. Lighter specimens with limited spots may be similar to H. axyridis, but the pronotum and elytral pattern does not overlap.

The four-spot ladybird is a predator of various species of aphids such as Lachnus pinicola. The period of activity extend from March to October. These beetles over-winter in communities under the bark of various deciduous and coniferous trees such as pines and poplars.

== Distribution and habitat ==
Harmonia quadripunctata is widespread from northern to southern Europe. In the British Isles the four-spot ladybird is found only sporadically. The species is also present in the eastern Palearctic realm and in the Near East. These ladybirds live in pine forests from the lowlands to the hills.

Rare vagrant records of this species have historically occurred in coastal eastern North America. However a potential colony of this species was discovered in Massachusetts starting in 2014, where it has likely formed a sustainable population.

== Subspecies ==
- Harmonia quadripunctata var. sordida Weise, 1879
- Harmonia quadripunctata var. nebulosa Weise, 1879
- Harmonia quadripunctata var. abieticola Weise, 1885
- Harmonia quadripunctata var. pinastri Weise, 1879
- Harmonia quadripunctata var. rustica Weise, 1879
- Harmonia quadripunctata var. multimaculata Heyden
- Harmonia quadripunctata var. sedecimpunctata (Fabricius, 1781)

== Gallery ==
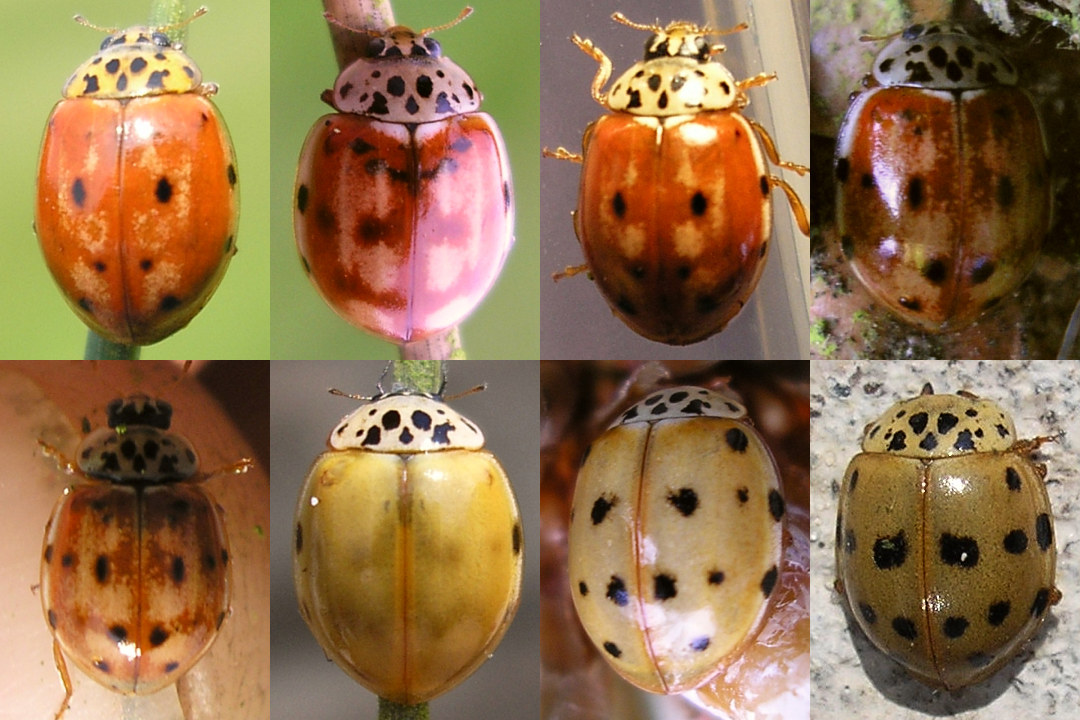
Variability of Harmonia quadripunctata

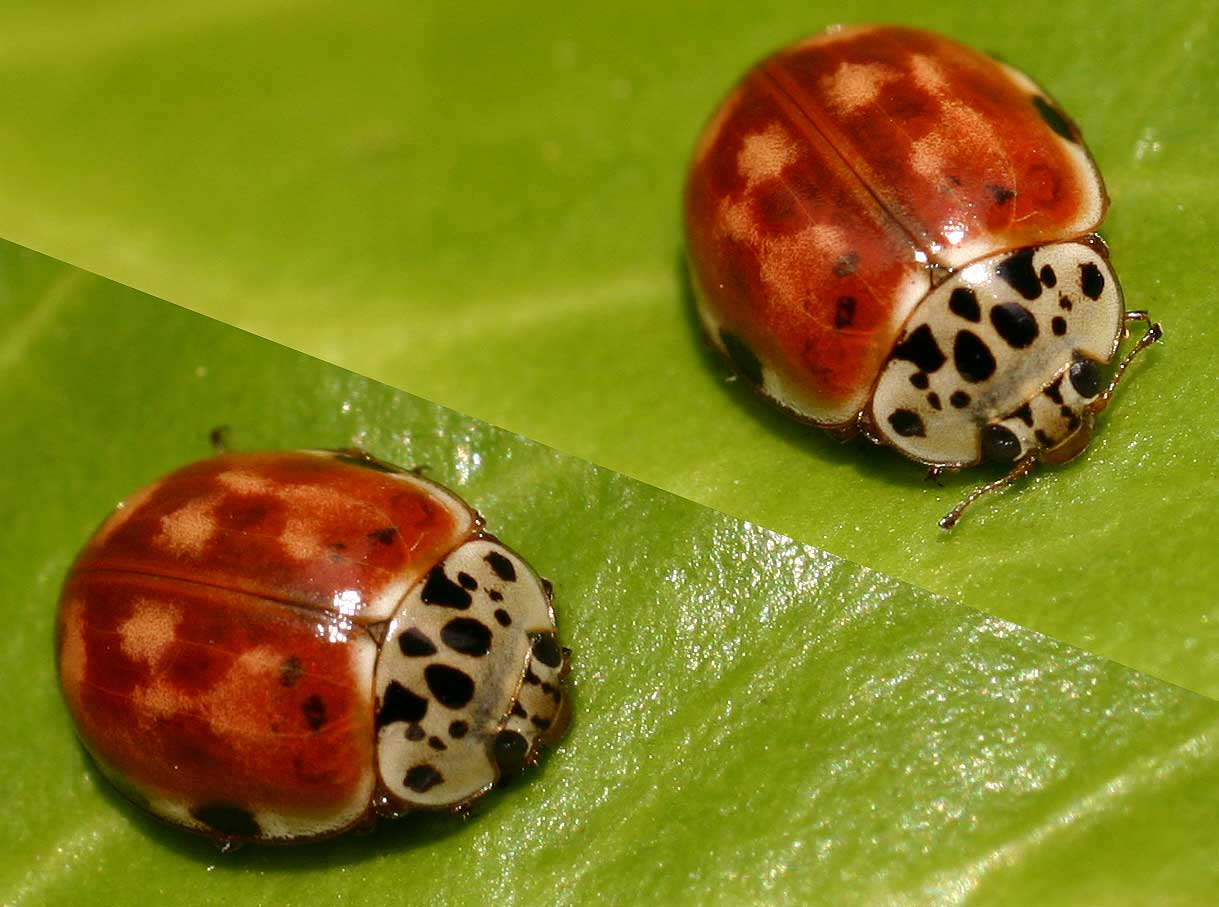
Harmonia quadripunctata – reddish form

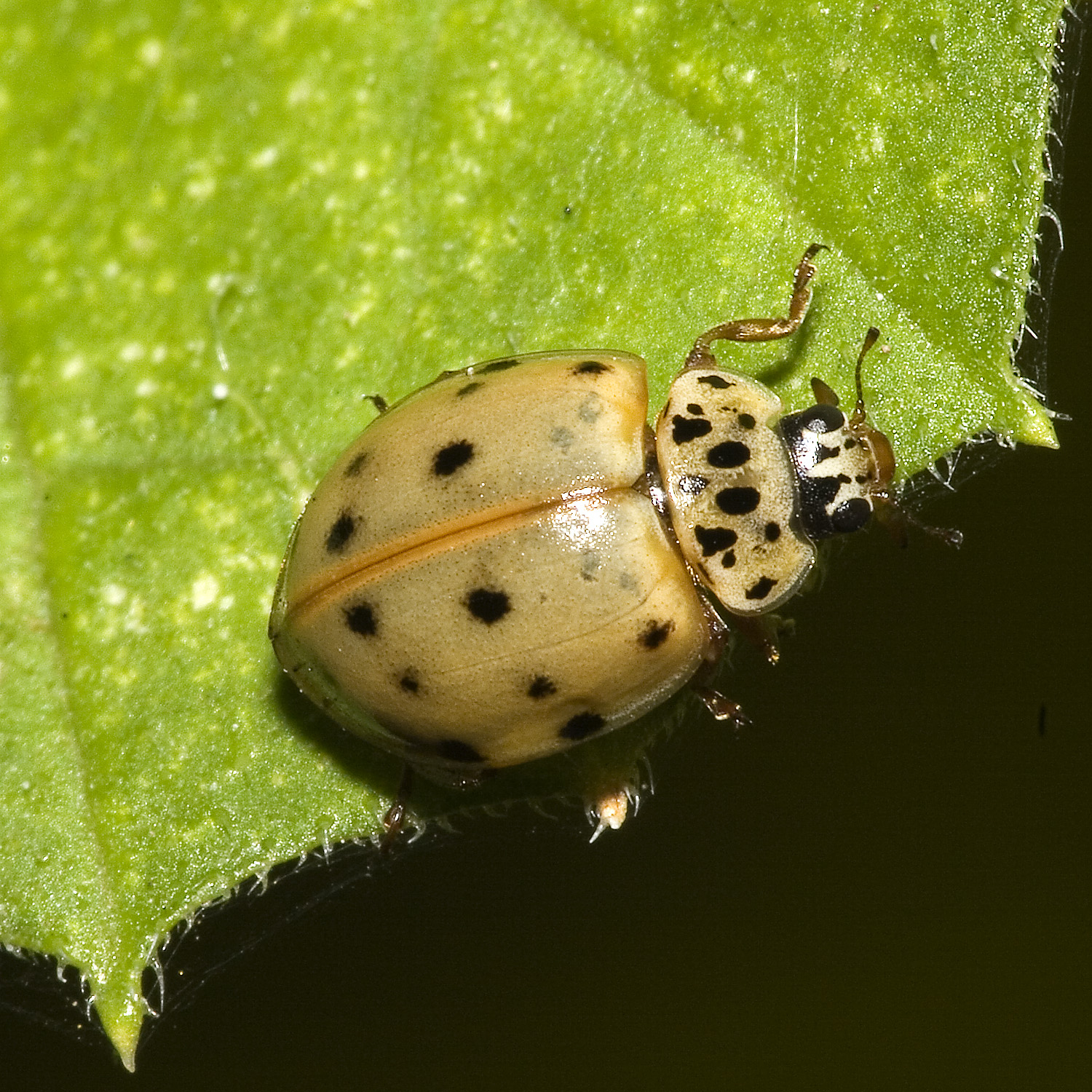
Harmonia quadripunctata – yellowish form

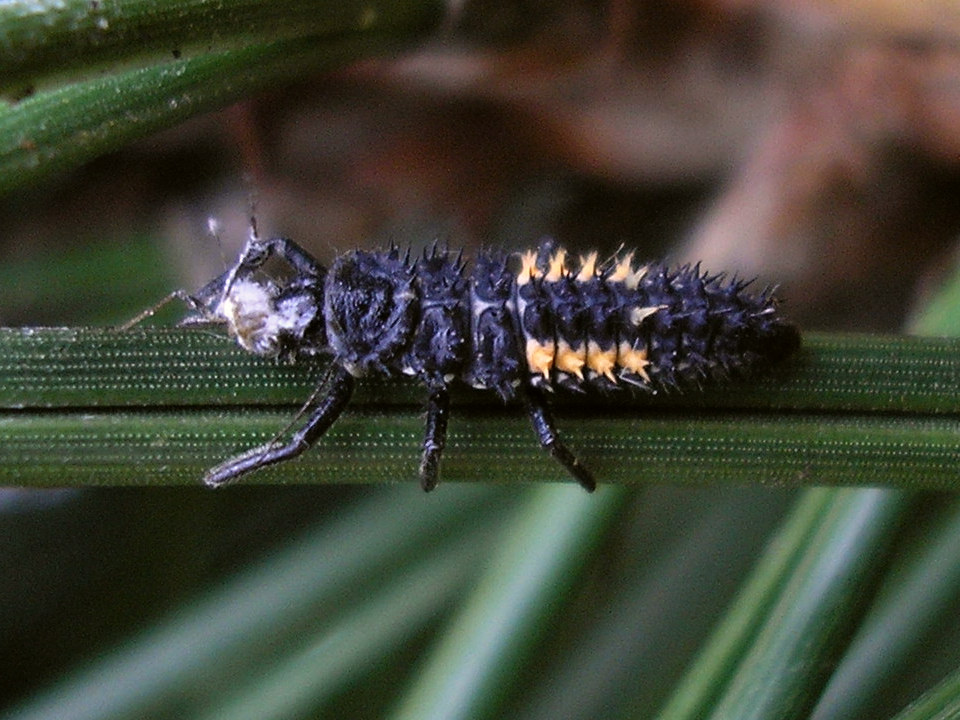
Larva of Harmonia quadripunctata

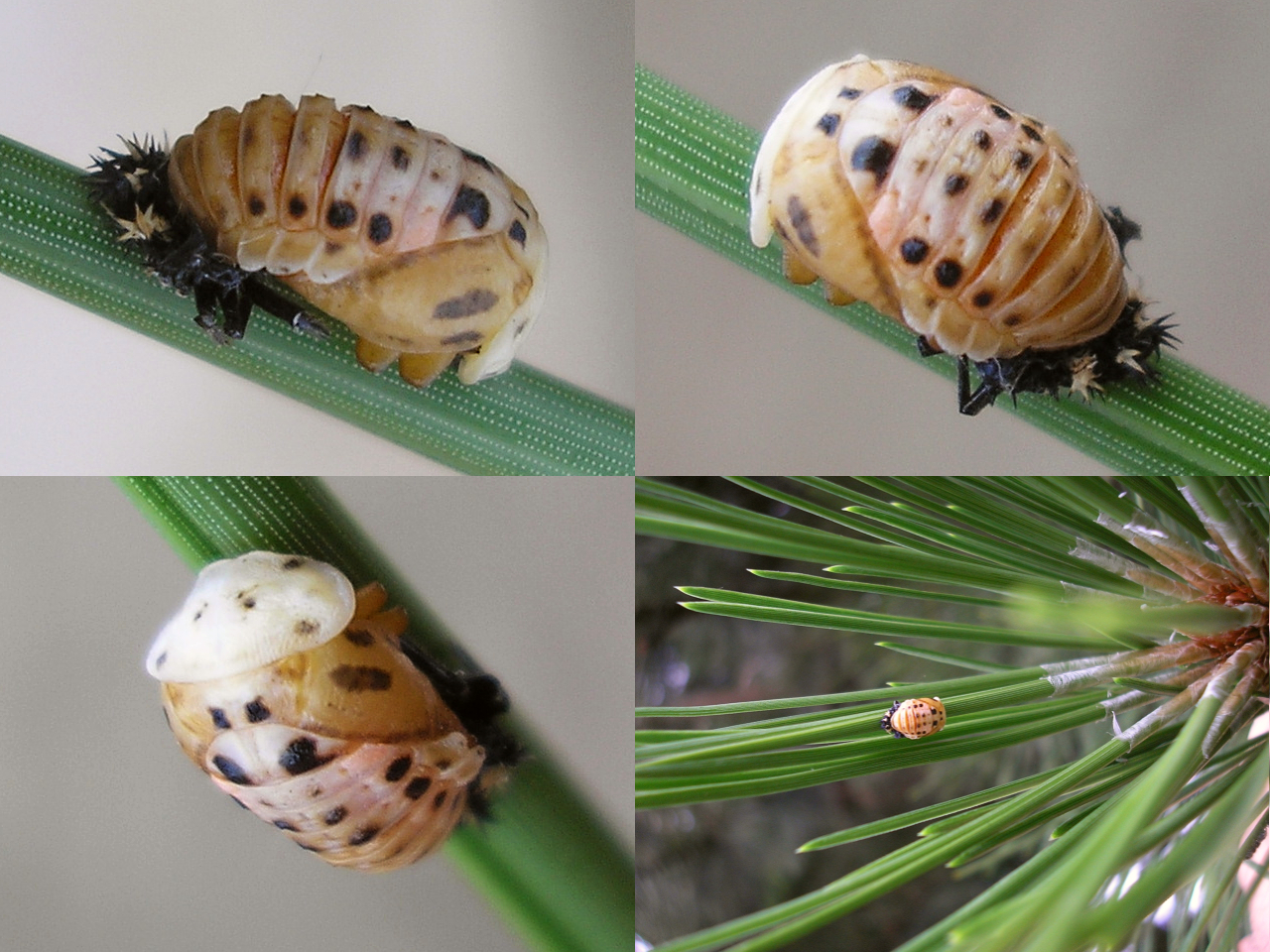
Pupa of Harmonia quadripunctata
