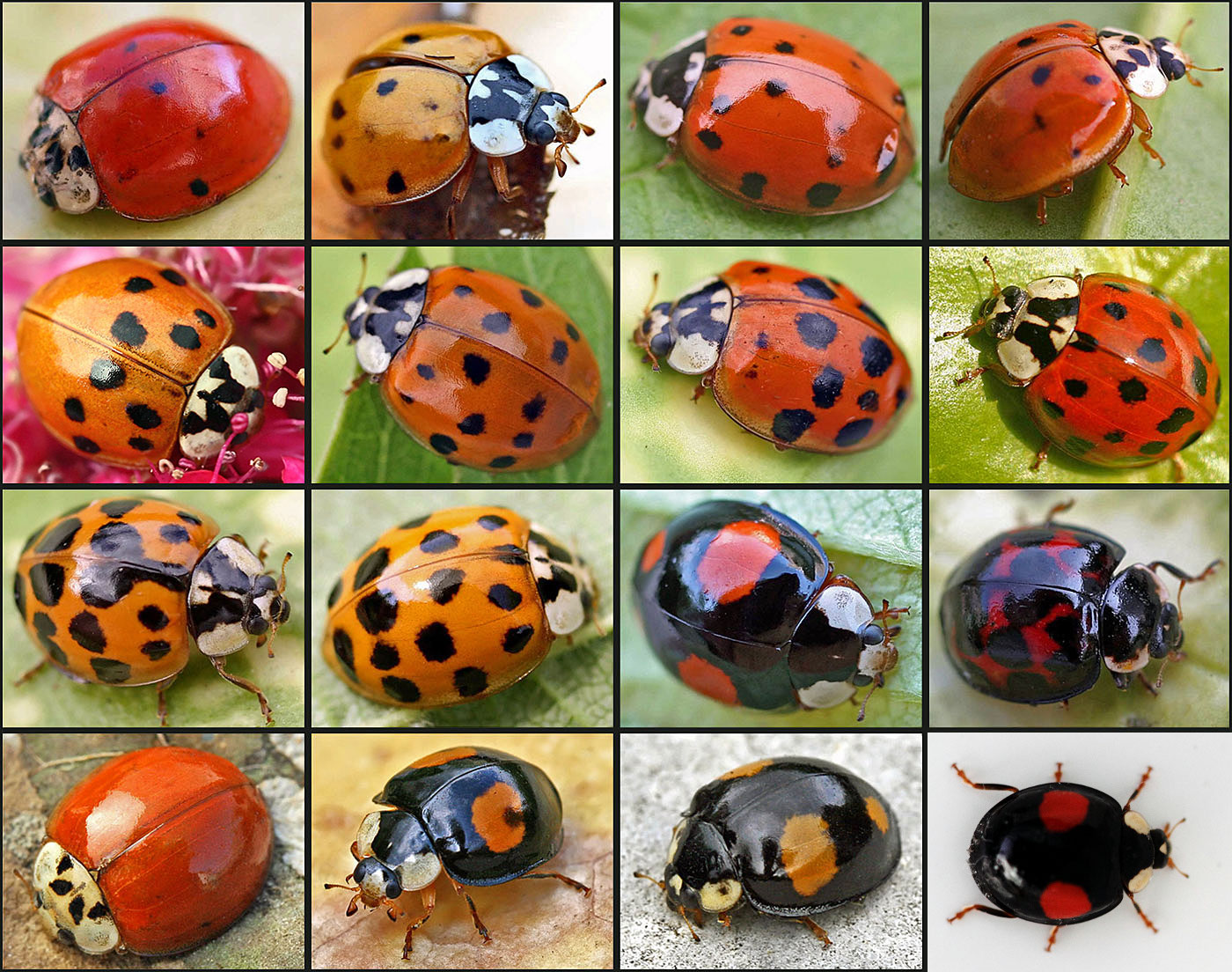

Scientific classification
- Kingdom: Animalia
- Phylum: Arthropoda
- Clade: Pancrustacea
- Class: Insecta
- Order: Coleoptera
- Suborder: Polyphaga
- Infraorder: Cucujiformia
- Family: Coccinellidae
- Genus: Harmonia
- Species: H. axyridis

Binomial name
- Harmonia axyridis (Pallas, 1773)

Synonyms
- Anatis circe Mulsant, 1850; Coccinella bisexnotata Herbst, 1793; Leis axyridis (Pallas); Ptychanatis axyridis (Pallas); Coccinella axyridis Pallas, 1773

= Harmonia axyridis =

Species of beetle

Harmonia axyridis collected from a flowering plant in Haddock, Georgia. Scale bar represents 1 cm (approx. ⅜ inch).

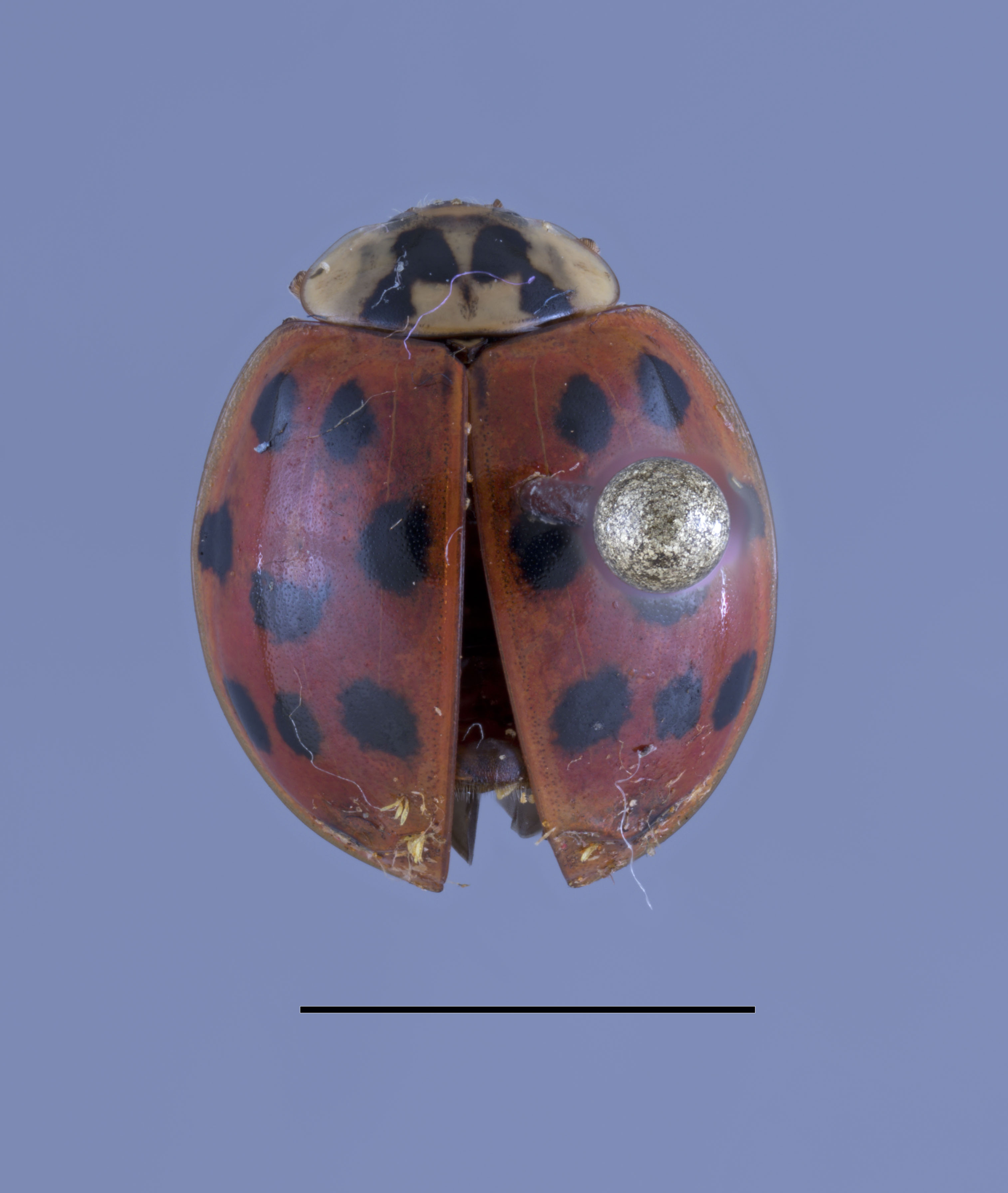
Harmonia axyridis. Scale bar represents 1 cm (approx. ⅜ inch). Collected inside a residence in Baldwin County, Georgia.

Harmonia axyridis is a lady beetle, ladybug, or ladybird species that is most commonly known as the harlequin, Asian, or multicolored Asian lady beetle. This is one of the most variable lady beetle species in the world, with an exceptionally wide range of color forms. It is native to eastern Asia, and has been artificially introduced to North America and Europe to control aphids and scale insects. It is now common, well known, and spreading in those regions, and has also become established in Africa and widely across South America.

This species is conspicuous in North America, where it may locally be known as the Halloween beetle, as it often invades homes during October to overwinter. Other names include multivariate, southern, Japanese, and pumpkin ladybird. Like other coccinellid beetles, this species may interchangeably be referred to as a lady beetle, ladybug, or ladybird, though entomologists prefer the names ladybird beetles or lady beetles to avoid confusion with true bugs. A widespread misconception exists that this species is not a ladybug due to confusion over common names.

== Description ==
Harmonia axyridis is a typical coccinellid beetle in shape and structure, being domed and having a "smooth" transition between its elytra (wing coverings), pronotum, and head. It ranges from 5.5 to 8.5 mm (0.22 to 0.33 in) in size.

The common color form, f. succinea, is orange or red in coloration with 0–22 black spots of variable size. The other usual forms, f. conspicua and f. spectabilis, are uniformly black with, respectively, two or four red markings. The pronotum is white with variable black patterning, ranging from a few black spots in an M formation to almost entirely black. The underside is dark with a wide reddish-brown border. Numerous other forms have also been recorded. Extreme forms may be entirely black, or feature complex patterns of black, orange and red. Color polymorphism is likely hereditary, regulated in many cases by a single gene; but this might also depend on the location and time of year in which the pupae are exposed to different temperatures. Darker color variations are more common in Asia than in North America.

Eggs range in shades of yellow depending on their age but turn black a day before they hatch. On average they are around 1.2 mm (1/20 inch) in length.

The large size of this beetle is usually the first clue to its identification. Despite variation, this species does not generally overlap in pronotal or elytral pattern with any other species, except in unmarked orange or red forms. In Europe it is similar to the much smaller Adalia decempunctata, while in America it is similar to the much smaller Mulsantina picta and spotless forms of Adalia bipunctata. When identification is difficult, the underside pattern usually enables a reliable conclusion. Identification is most simple for the common forms, while less common varieties may take longer to identify. They always have reddish-brown legs and are obviously brown on the underside of the abdomen, even in the melanic color forms.

== Range ==
Harmonia axyridis is native to eastern Asia, from central Siberia, Kazakhstan, and Uzbekistan in the west, through Russia south to the Himalayas and east to the Pacific coast, including Japan, Korea, Mongolia, China, and Taiwan.

As a voracious predator, it was identified as a biocontrol agent for aphids and scale insects. Consequently, it has been introduced into greenhouses, crop fields, and gardens in many countries, including the United States and parts of Europe. The species is now established in North America (United States, Canada, Mexico), Central America (Guatemala, Honduras, Costa Rica, Panama), South America (Brazil, Venezuela, Colombia, Ecuador, Peru, Argentina, Chile), Europe (Italy, Spain, the United Kingdom, Denmark, Sweden, Norway, Finland, the Netherlands, Belgium, Luxembourg, France, Germany, the Czech Republic, Slovakia, Hungary, Romania, Serbia, Croatia, Bosnia and Herzegovina, Poland), Israel, New Zealand, and South Africa.

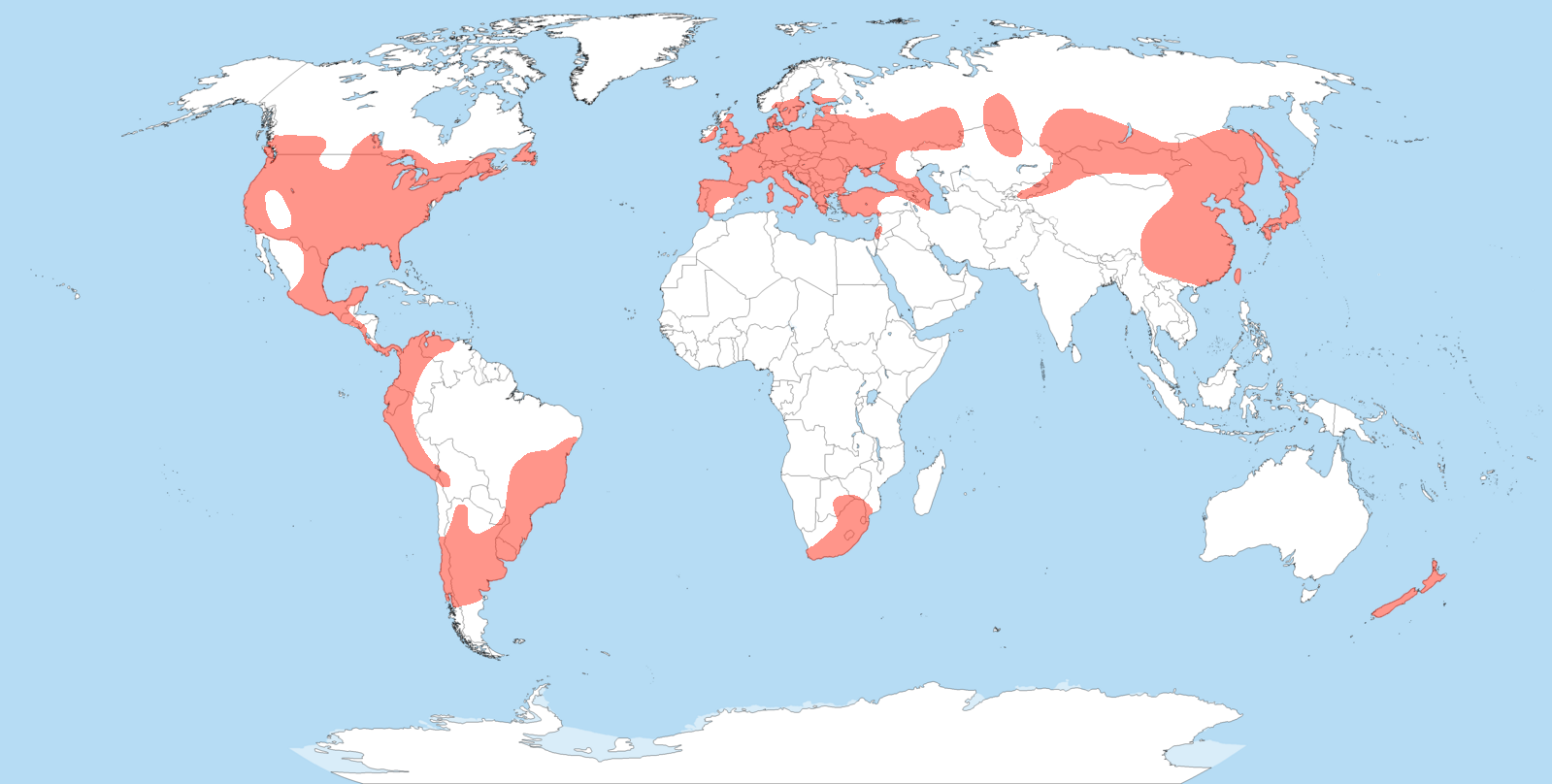
Asian lady beetle range (native and introduced)

=== North America ===
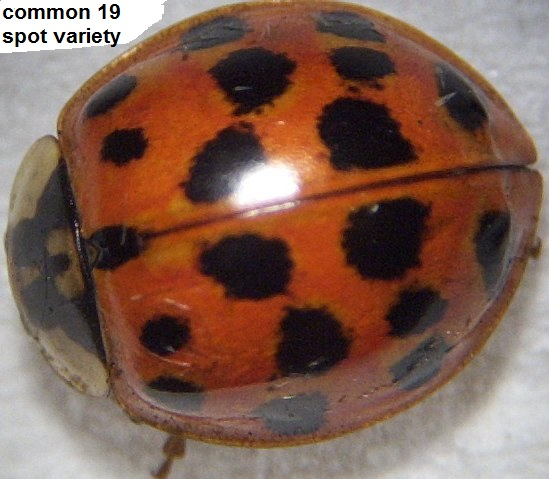
Typical H. axyridis specimen from northern California

This species spread across continents because of human-mediated processes. It became established in North America as the result of introductions into the United States in an attempt to control the spread of aphids. In the last three decades, this insect has spread throughout the US and Canada, and has been a prominent factor in controlling aphid populations. The first introductions into the US took place as early as 1916. The species repeatedly failed to establish in the wild after successfully controlling aphid populations, but an established population of beetles was observed in the wild near New Orleans, Louisiana, in about 1988. In the following years, it quickly spread to other states, being occasionally observed in the Midwest within five to seven years and becoming common in the region by about 2000. The species was also established in the Northwest by 1991, and the Northeast by 1994, aided by additional introductions from the native range, rather than just reaching there from the Southeast. Reportedly, it has heavily fed on soybean aphids (which recently appeared in the US after coming from China), supposedly saving farmers vast sums of money in 2001.

=== Worldwide propagation ===
Worldwide routes of propagation of H. axyridis were described with genetic markers in 2010. The populations in eastern and western North America originated from two independent introductions from the native range. The South American and African populations originated independently from eastern North America. The European population also originated from eastern North America, but with substantial genetic admixture with individuals of the European biocontrol strain (estimated at 40%).

The species is widely considered to be one of the world's most invasive insects, putting native ladybird species at risk by outcompeting them, eating their eggs, and poisoning them. The blood of H. axyridis contains the antibacterial chemical harmonine, which helps harlequins resist diseases that affect other ladybirds, and is toxic to most native ladybirds if they eat a harlequin's eggs. In addition, harlequins are carriers for a microsporidian parasite, which does not harm the harlequins but can infect and kill other species. Native ladybird species have experienced often dramatic declines in areas invaded by H. axyridis. In Europe, harlequins are currently increasing to the detriment of indigenous species; the harlequin's large range and longer reproductive period allow it to outcompete other ladybirds.In 2015, H. axyridis was declared the fastest-invading species in the UK, spreading throughout the country after the first sighting was confirmed in 2004.

The harlequin has a reputation as a household pest, due to its tendency to overwinter indoors and the unpleasant odor and stain left by their bodily fluids when frightened or crushed, as well as their tendency to bite humans. In addition, the harlequin has been reported to be a minor agricultural pest that has been inadvertently harvested with crops in Iowa, Ohio, New York, and Ontario, causing a detectable and distinctly unpleasant taste, known as "lady beetle taint". In particular, contamination of grapes by the beetle has been found to alter the taste of wine.

== Biology and behaviour ==
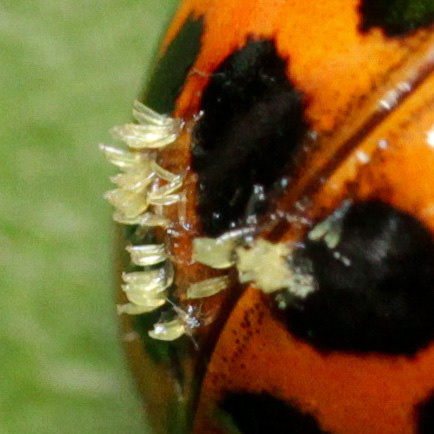
Parasitic fungus Hesperomyces harmoniae on Harmonia axyridis.

Harmonia axyridis becomes dormant in cooler months, though it will move around whenever the temperature reaches about 10 °C (50 °F). Because the beetles will use crevices and other cool, dry, confined spaces to overwinter, significant numbers may congregate inside walls if given a large enough opening.

Large aggregations are often seen in autumn. The beetles have pheromones to signal each other. However, many aggregation cues are visual, picking out sites at both long (light-colored structures that are distinct from their surroundings) and short (pre-existing aggregations to join) distances. Non-volatile long-chain hydrocarbons laid down by previous aggregations also play a significant role in site selection. Both visual and hydrocarbon cues are more important than volatile pheromones.

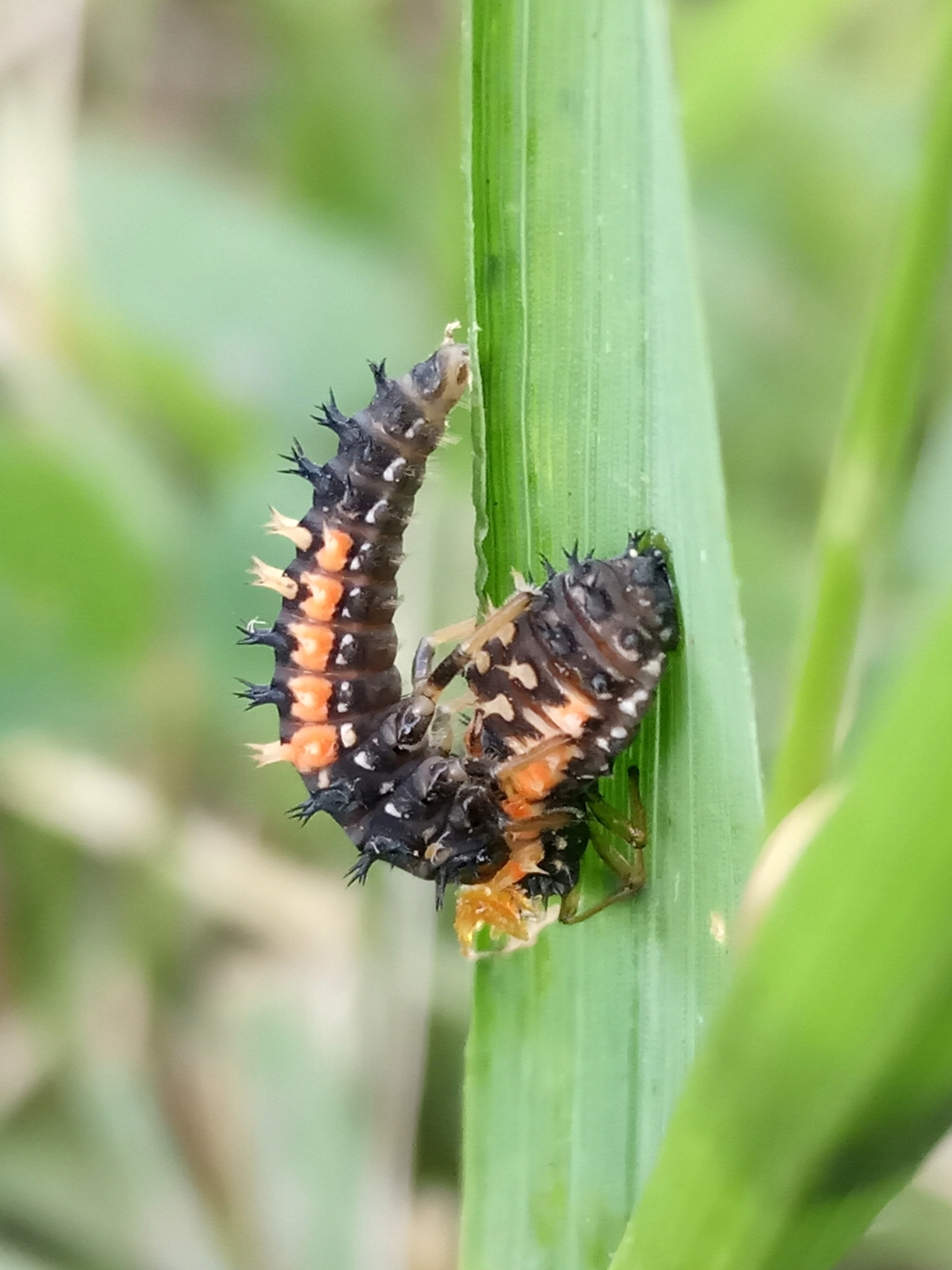
Larval cannibalism

They often congregate in sunlit areas because of the heat available, so even on fairly cold winter days, some of the hibernating beetles will "wake up" because of solar heating. Large populations can be problematic because they can form swarms and linger in an area for a long time. The beetles can form groups that stay in upper corners of windows. This beetle has been also found to be attracted to dark screening material for its warmth. It has good eyesight; it will return to a location from which it is removed, and is known to give a small bite if provoked.

Similar to most ladybeetles, H. axyridis is a primarily carnivorous species, eating Hemipteran insects such as aphids. However, the beetles also feed on fruits like grapes and raspberries; this switch to fruit-feeding, hypothesized to increase resources for overwintering, is unusual for Coccinellidae. Their generalist feeding preferences have contributed to their success as an invasive and agricultural pest around the world.

H. axyridis, like other ladybeetles or ladybirds, uses isopropyl methoxy pyrazine as a defensive chemical to deter predation, and also carries this chemical in its hemolymph at much higher concentrations than many other ladybeetle species, along with species- and genus-specific defensive compounds such as harmonine. These insects will "reflex bleed" when agitated, releasing hemolymph from their legs. The liquid has a foul odour (similar to that of dead leaves), a bitter taste, and can stain porous materials. Some people have allergic reactions, including allergic rhinoconjunctivitis when exposed to these beetles. Occasionally, the beetles will bite humans, presumably in an attempt to acquire salt, although many people feel a pricking sensation as a beetle walks across the skin. Bites normally do no more harm than cause irritation, although a small number of people are allergic to bites. Their natural predators include birds, spined soldier bugs, ants (including the also invasive Solenopsis invicta) and other coccinellids, including fellow Harmonia axyridis.

These beetles can be difficult to identify because of their variations in color, spot size, and spot count of the elytra. The easiest way to identify H. axyridis f. succinea is to look at the pronotum and see whether the black markings look like a letter "W" or "M". This species has more white markings on the pronotum than have most native North American species, though this feature is not useful when attempting to separate it from species in other parts of the world.

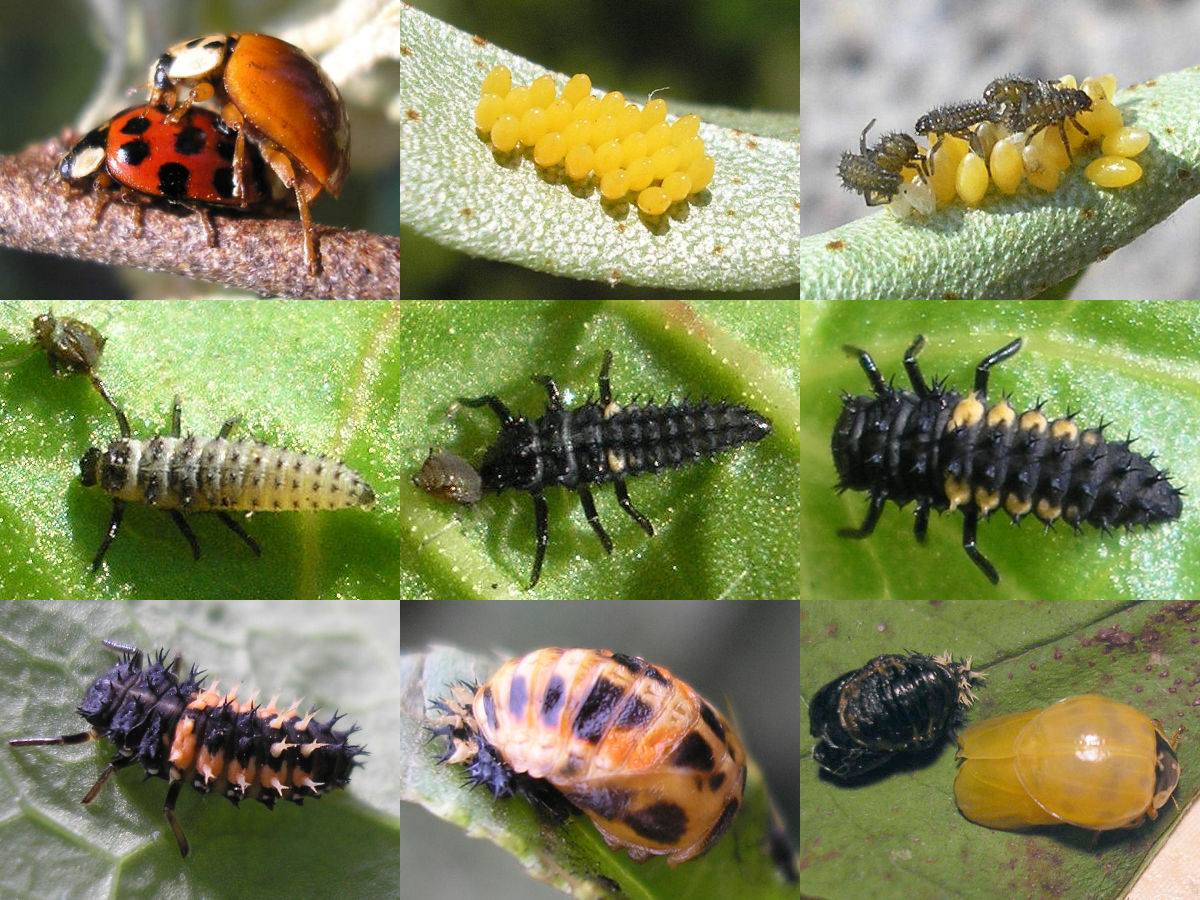
Life cycle: mating, eggs, five larval stages, pupa and newly emerged adult

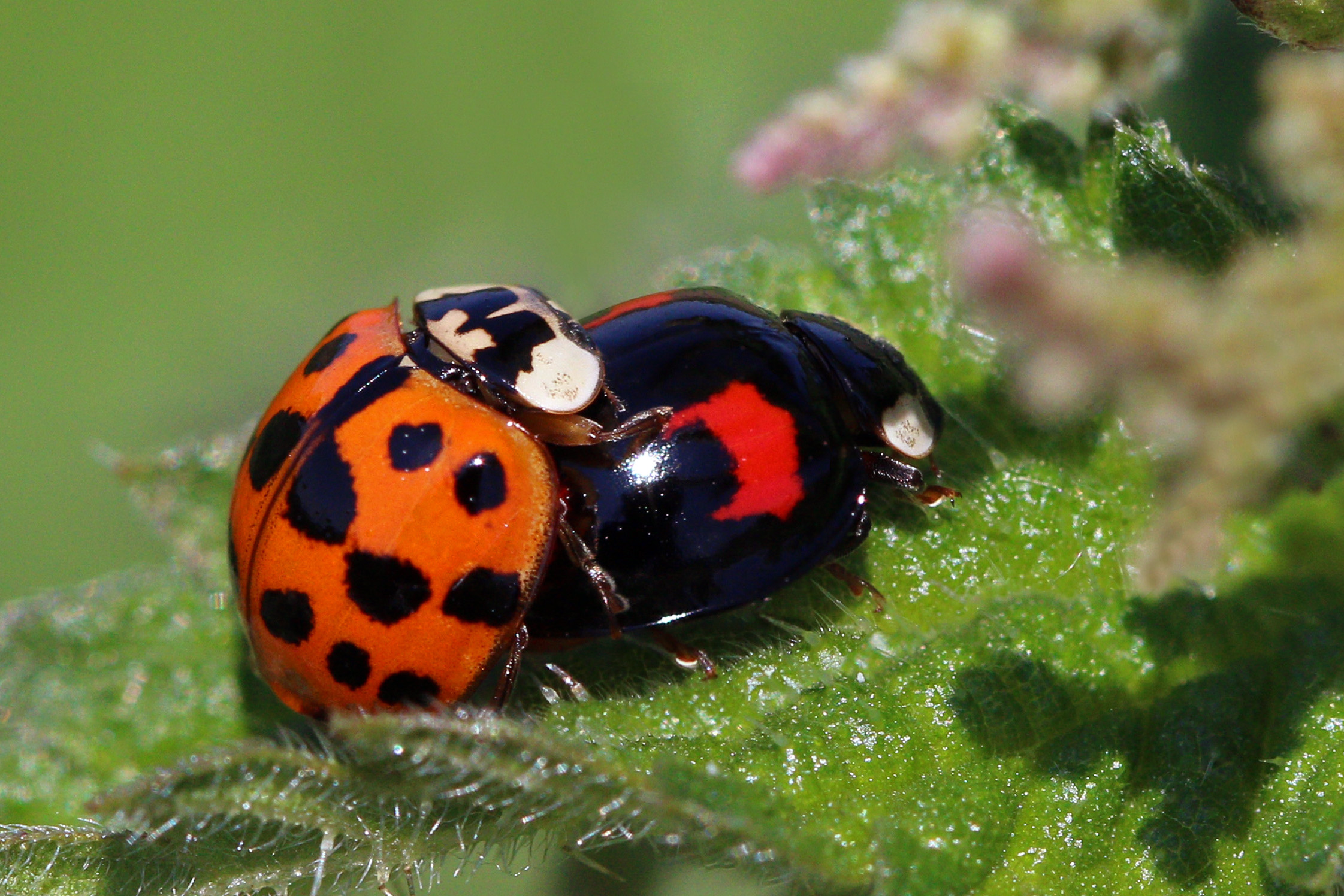
Mating

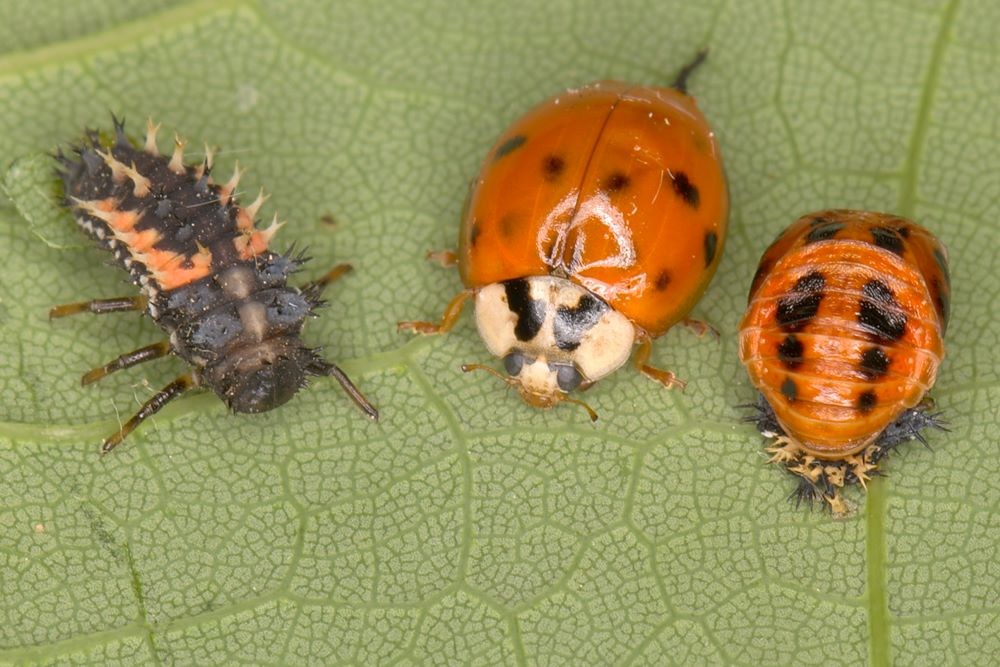
Larva (left), adult (center), and pupa (right)

Eclosing from pupal case

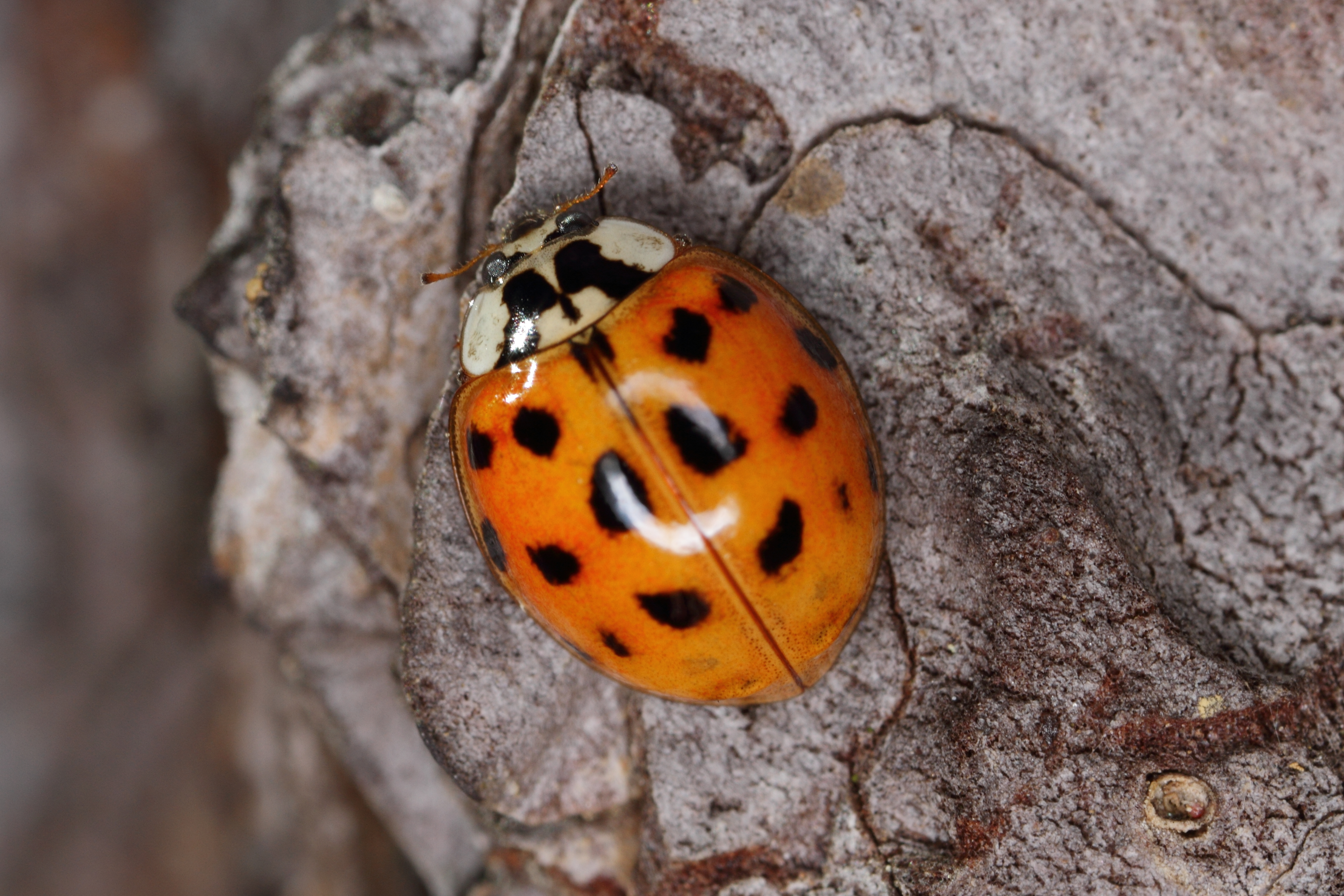
Spotted adult

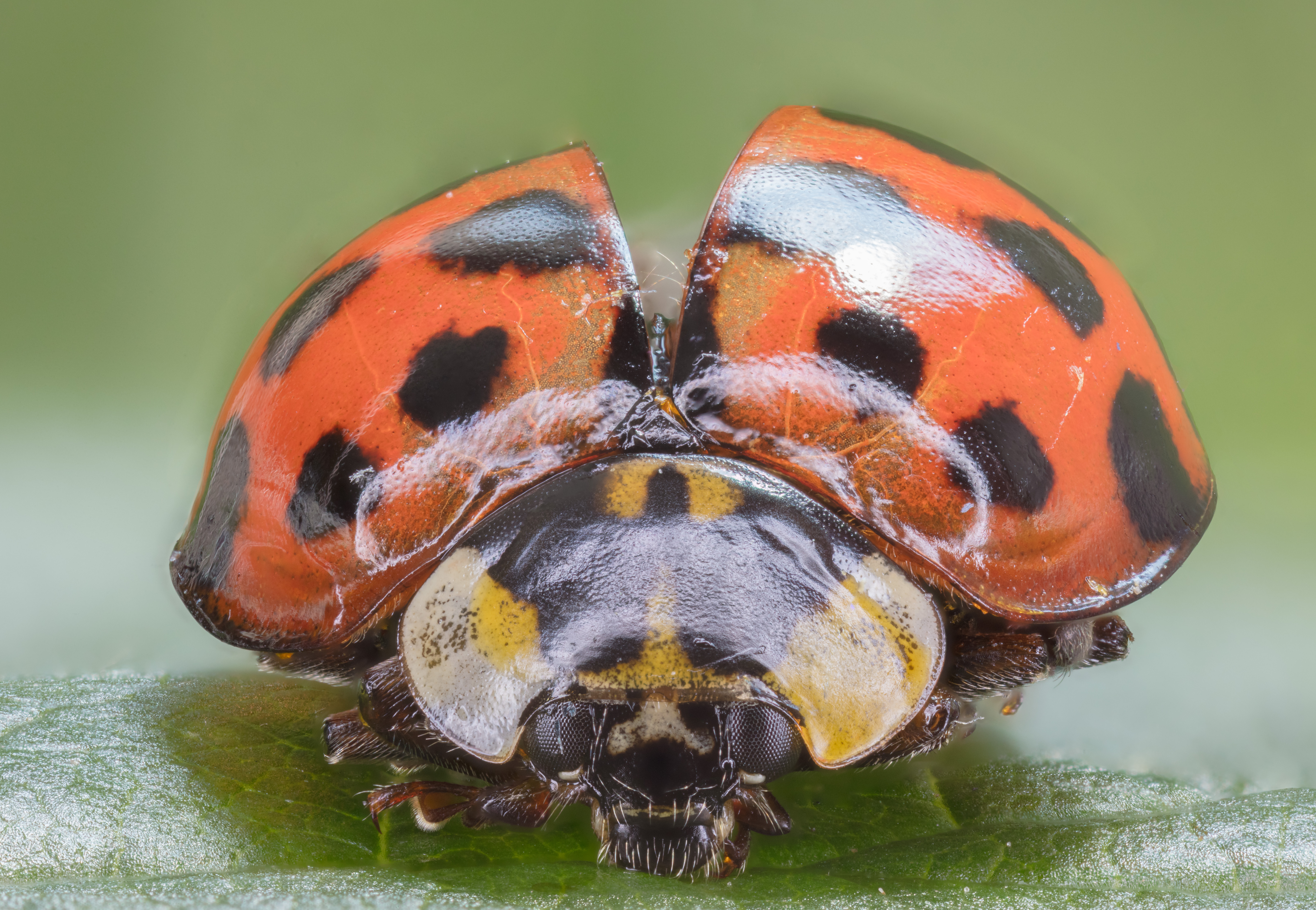
With elytra slightly open

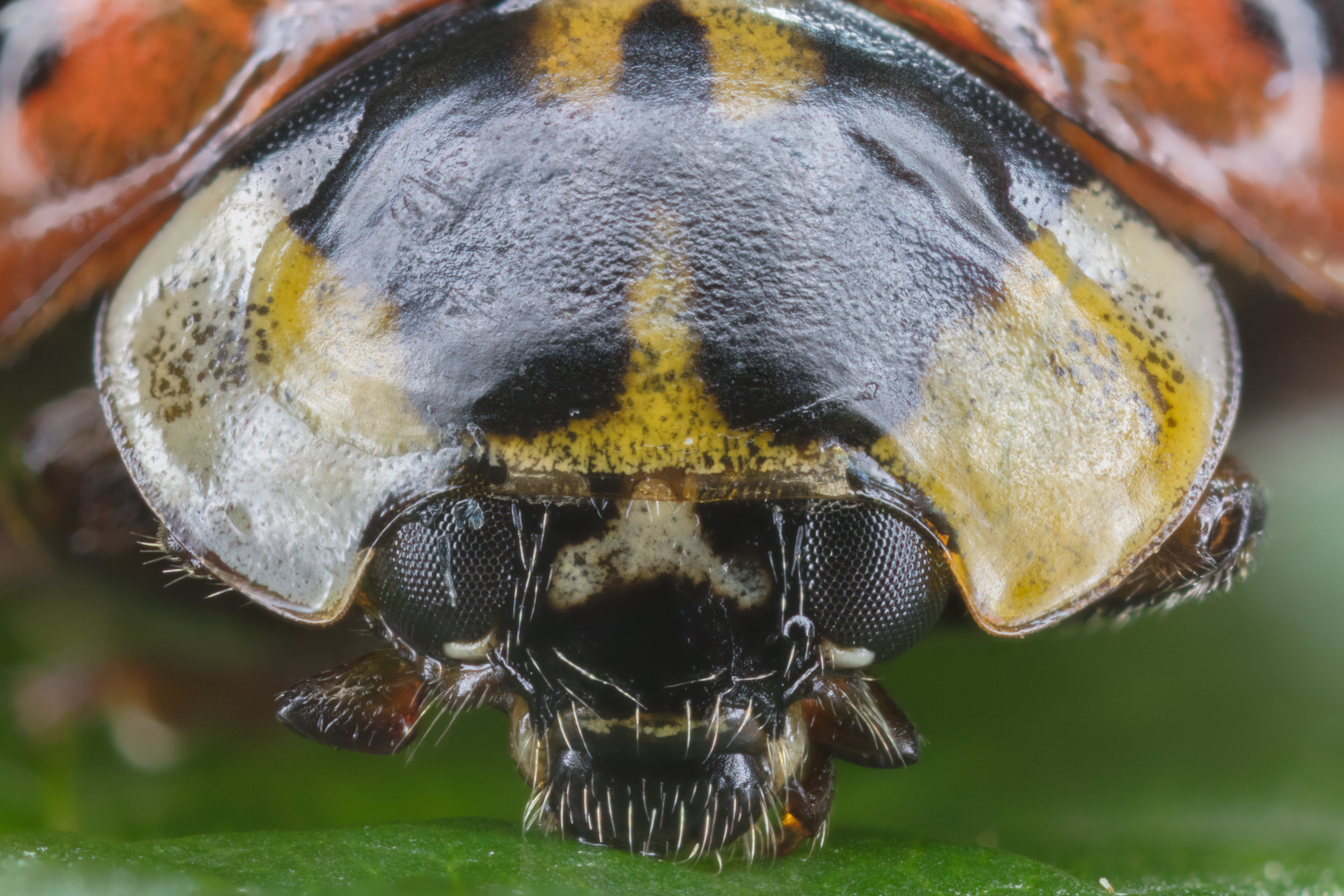
Detail of head and thorax

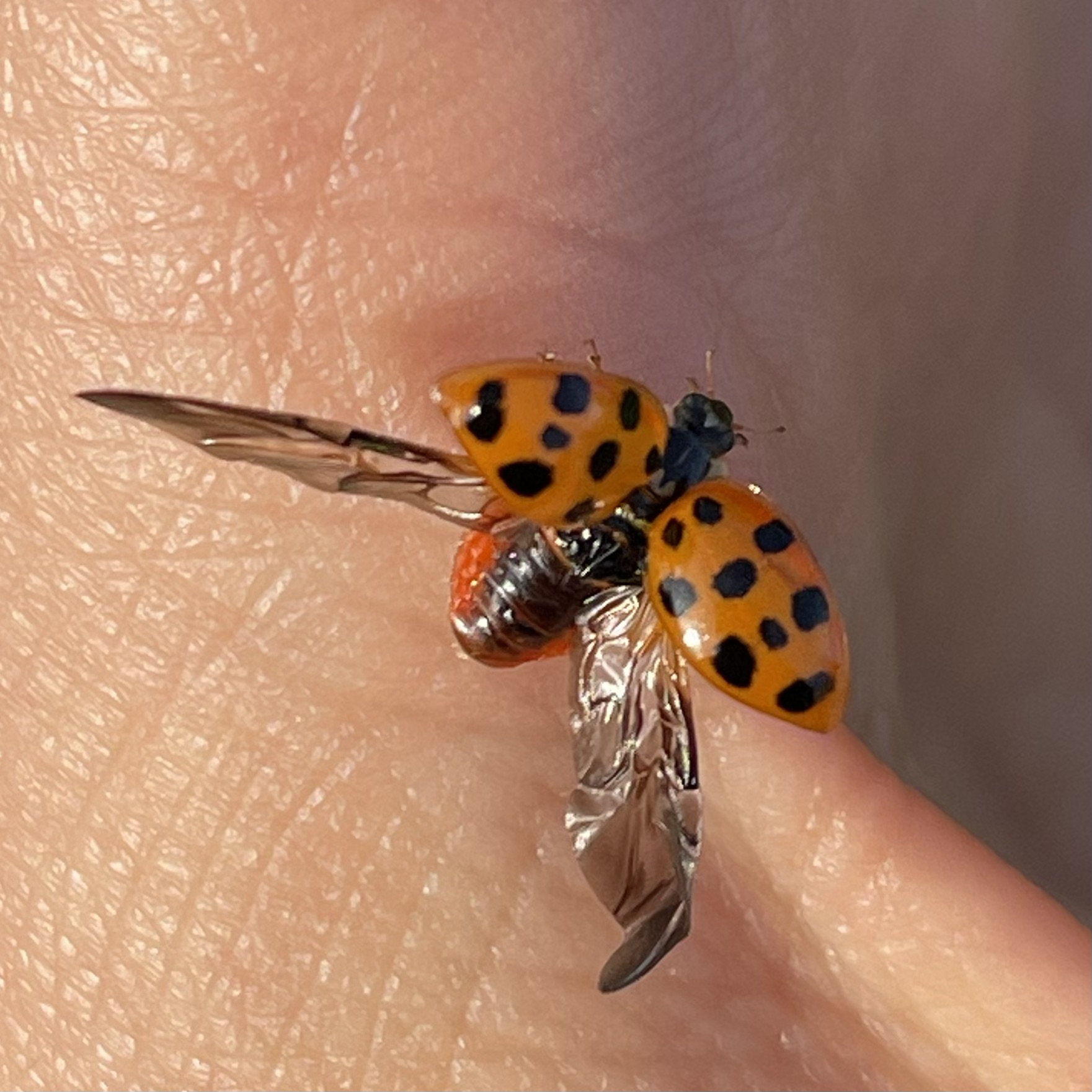
Wings spread out

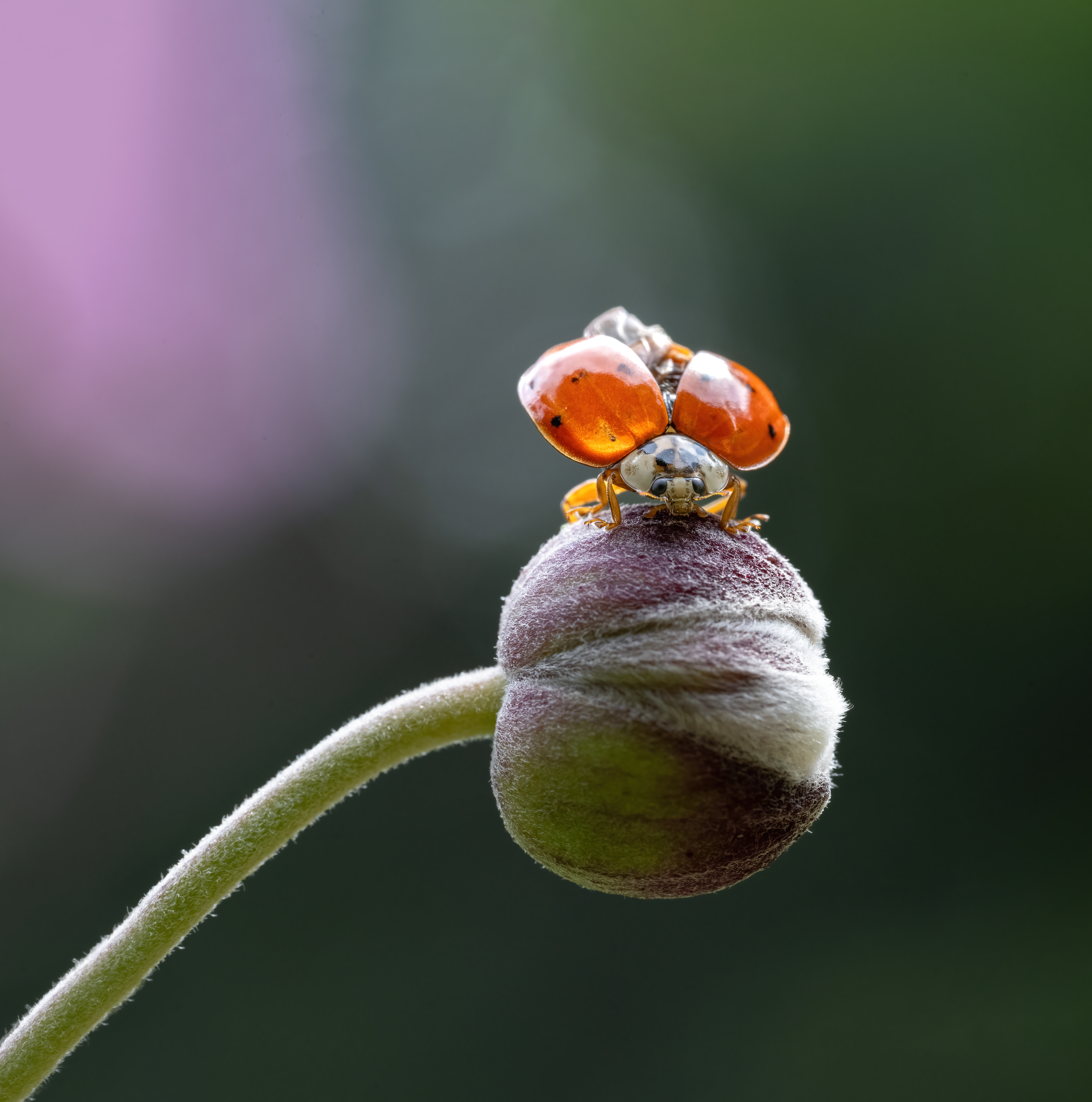
Ready for flight

== Control ==
Numerous methods of control have been investigated in areas where this beetle has been introduced and causes a threat to native species and biodiversity and to the grape industry. Methods of control include insecticides, trapping, removal of aggregates of beetles, and mechanically preventing entry to buildings. Methods under development involve the investigation of natural parasites and pathogens, including the use of parasitic sexually transmitted mites and fungal diseases.

The best methods for dealing with H. axyridis in private homes involve sealing openings they may enter. Sweeping and vacuuming are considered effective methods for removing them from homes, though this should be done carefully so as not to trigger reflex bleeding. A nylon stocking placed inside the vacuum cleaner's hose, secured with a rubber band, allows the beetles to be "bagged" rather than collected inside the machine. A trap designed for indoor use was developed which attracts the beetles with a light and seals them in a removable bag.

== Biochemistry ==
Harmonia axyridis secretes a number of defensive compounds, one of which, (9Z,17R)-9-Octadecene-1,17-diamine (harmonine) has been isolated from its hemolymph. This molecule has been reported to have broad-spectrum antimicrobial activity that includes human pathogens. Antibacterial activity is most pronounced against fast-growing mycobacteria and Mycobacterium tuberculosis, and the growth of both chloroquine-resistant Plasmodium falciparum strains is also inhibited; causative agents of tuberculosis and malaria respectively.
