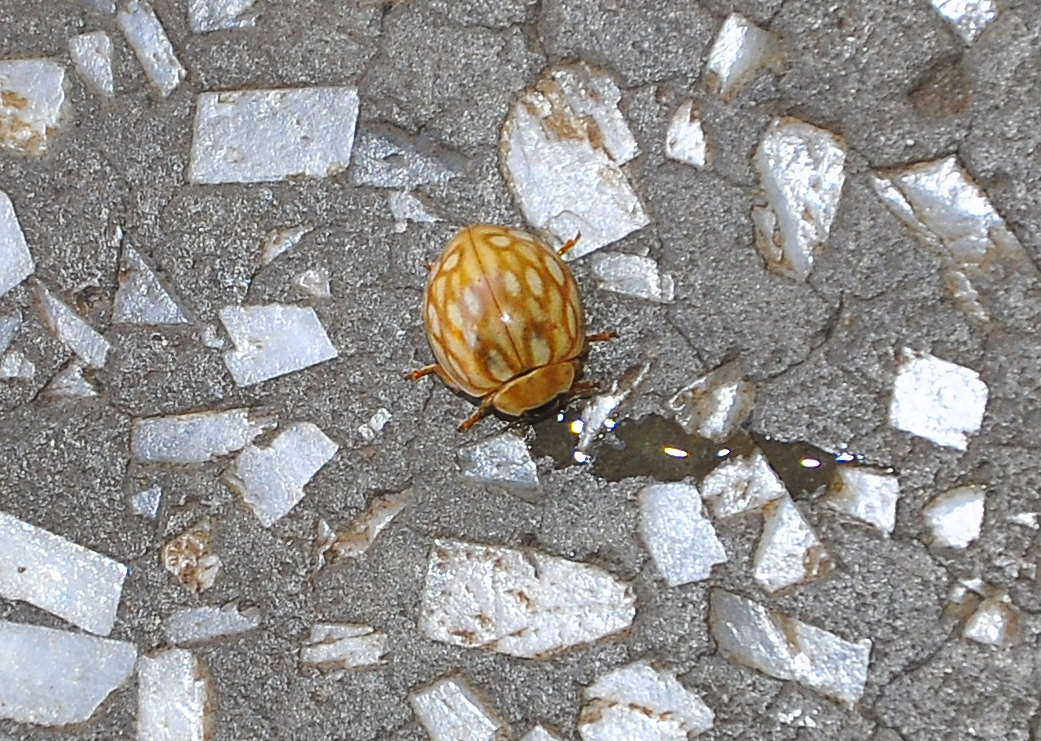

Scientific classification
- Kingdom: Animalia
- Phylum: Arthropoda
- Clade: Pancrustacea
- Class: Insecta
- Order: Coleoptera
- Suborder: Polyphaga
- Infraorder: Cucujiformia
- Family: Coccinellidae
- Genus: Harmonia
- Species: H. eucharis

Binomial name
- Harmonia eucharis (Mulsant, 1853)

Synonyms
- Ballia eucharis Mulsant, 1853; Coccinella basalis Kollar & Redtenbacher, 1844; Ballia christophori Mulsant, 1853; Ballia montivaga Mulsant, 1853; Ballia testacea Mulsant, 1853; Ballia dianae Mulsant, 1853; Ballia brahmae Mulsant, 1853; Ballia gustavii Mulsant, 1853; Pelina zephirinae Mulsant, 1866; Pelina mayeti Mulsant, 1866; Neda bayaderae Mulsant, 1866; Harmonia roubali Mader, 1931; Ballia korschefskyi Mader, 1933

= Harmonia eucharis =

Species of beetle

Harmonia eucharis is a species of beetle of the family Coccinellidae. It is found in India (Arunachal Pradesh, Assam, Himachal Pradesh, Jammu & Kashmir, Manipur, Meghalaya, Mizoram, Nagaland, Sikkim, Tripura, Uttarakhand, Uttar Pradesh), Pakistan, Bhutan and Nepal. It was introduced to North Carolina, but did not establish.

== Description ==
Adults reach a length of about 6.5–10.5 mm (0.26–0.41 in). The elytra are pale yellowish brown, mostly with 4–5 black spots, but the elytral pattern is highly variable.

== Life history ==
They have been recorded feeding on a wide range of aphids and scale insects.
