= Harmonia micra =

Scientific classification
- Kingdom: Animalia
- Phylum: Arthropoda
- Clade: Pancrustacea
- Class: Insecta
- Order: Coleoptera
- Suborder: Polyphaga
- Infraorder: Cucujiformia
- Family: Coccinellidae
- Genus: Harmonia
- Species: H. micra

Binomial name
- Harmonia micra Ślipiński, Li & Pang, 2020

Species of beetle

Harmonia micra is a species of beetle of the family Coccinellidae. It is found on the Solomon Islands (Bougainville).

== Description ==
Adults reach a length of about 7.8–9.8 mm (0.31–0.39 in). The head is yellow and the pronotum is orange with a black medial area. The scutellum is black and elytra are black, each elytron with two orange spots. The ventral surface is completely yellow in females, and mostly yellow in males. The legs are yellow.

== Etymology ==
The species name refers to its small size.
