= Harmonia andamanensis =

Scientific classification
- Kingdom: Animalia
- Phylum: Arthropoda
- Clade: Pancrustacea
- Class: Insecta
- Order: Coleoptera
- Suborder: Polyphaga
- Infraorder: Cucujiformia
- Family: Coccinellidae
- Genus: Harmonia
- Species: H. andamanensis

Binomial name
- Harmonia andamanensis Poorani, 2023

Species of beetle

Harmonia andamanensis is a species of beetle of the family Coccinellidae. It is found in India (Andaman Islands).

== Description ==
Adults reach a length of about 4.2 mm (0.17 in). They are dull straw yellow to yellow, the pronotum with a M-shaped macula. Each elytron has two dorsal and two lateral maculae enclosing a larger, roughly comma-shaped macula. The ventral surface is yellow.

== Etymology ==
The species name refers to its type locality, the Andamans.
