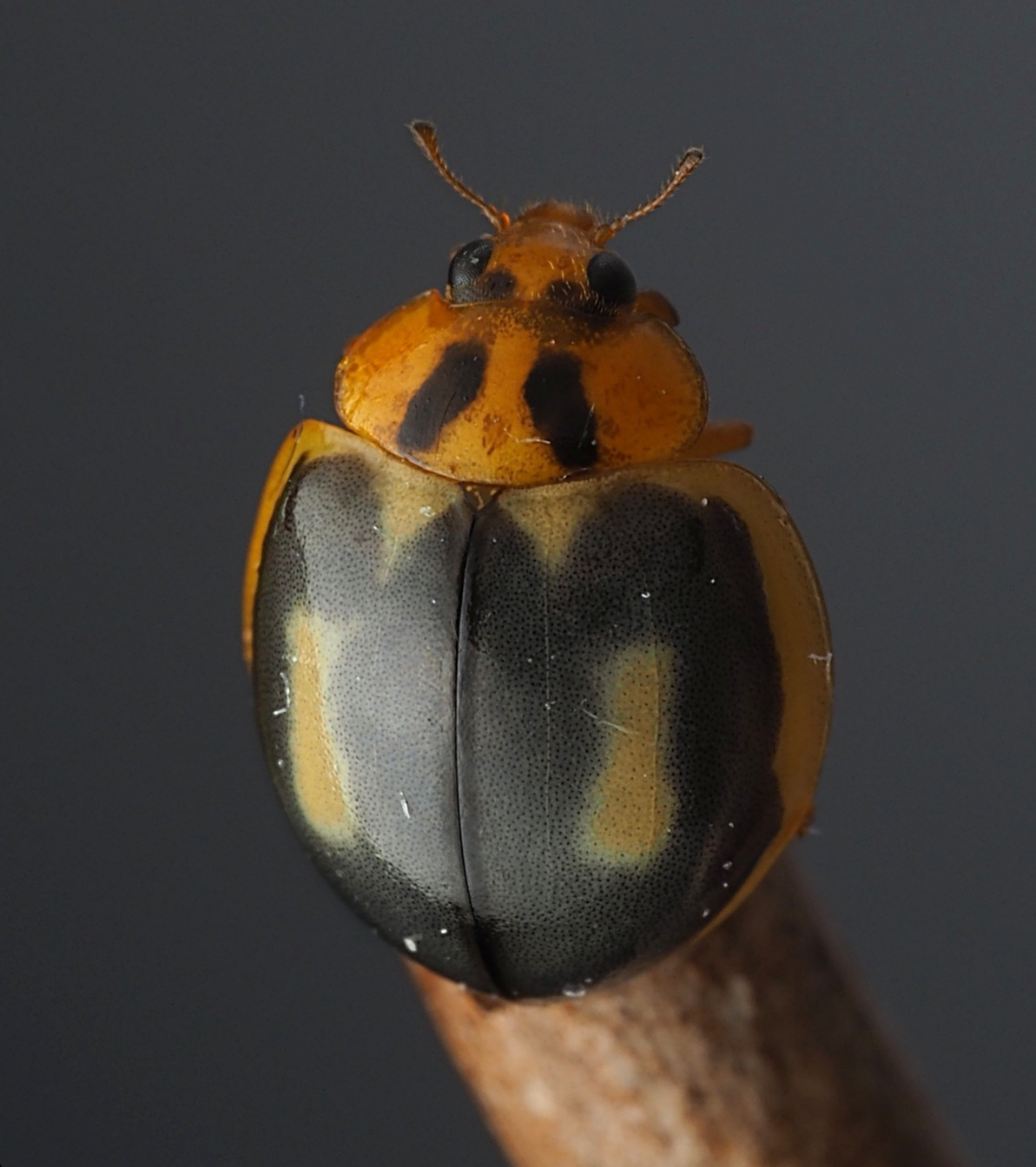

Scientific classification
- Kingdom: Animalia
- Phylum: Arthropoda
- Clade: Pancrustacea
- Class: Insecta
- Order: Coleoptera
- Suborder: Polyphaga
- Infraorder: Cucujiformia
- Family: Coccinellidae
- Genus: Harmonia
- Species: H. antipodum

Binomial name
- Harmonia antipodum (White, 1848)

Synonyms
- List: Coccinella antipodum White, 1848; Leis antipodum (White, 1848); Harmonia antipoda (White, 1848)

= Harmonia antipodum =

Species of beetle

Harmonia antipodum, known as the antipodean ladybird, is a species of ladybird beetle (family Coccinellidae) indigenous to New Zealand, though sometimes mistaken for a related non-native species, Harmonia conformis.

== Description ==
They are a brown colour, and about 3 mm long, while H. conformis is much larger and more conspicuously coloured.

== Diet ==
H. antipodum individuals have been observed eating other native and introduced insects, including Coccidae and psyllids.
