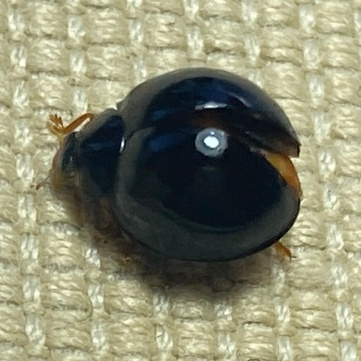

Scientific classification
- Kingdom: Animalia
- Phylum: Arthropoda
- Clade: Pancrustacea
- Class: Insecta
- Order: Coleoptera
- Suborder: Polyphaga
- Infraorder: Cucujiformia
- Family: Coccinellidae
- Genus: Harmonia
- Species: H. bicolor

Binomial name
- Harmonia bicolor (Blackburn, 1892)

Synonyms
- Neda bicolor Blackburn, 1892; Neda bicolor var. picturata Blackburn, 1895

= Harmonia bicolor =

Species of beetle

Harmonia bicolor is a species of beetle of the family Coccinellidae. It is found in Australia (northern Queensland).

== Description ==
Adults reach a length of about 5–7 mm (0.20–0.28 in). The frons and antennae are yellow or brown, while the pronotum is black with a small yellowish area. The scutellum is black and the elytra are either uniformly black or have an orange spot on each elytron. The ventral surface is mostly yellow or brown and the legs are usually brown.
