= Harmonia novaehebridensis =

Scientific classification
- Kingdom: Animalia
- Phylum: Arthropoda
- Clade: Pancrustacea
- Class: Insecta
- Order: Coleoptera
- Suborder: Polyphaga
- Infraorder: Cucujiformia
- Family: Coccinellidae
- Genus: Harmonia
- Species: H. novaehebridensis

Binomial name
- Harmonia novaehebridensis (Korschefsky, 1943)

Synonyms
- Coelophora novaehebridensis Korschefsky, 1943

Species of beetle

Harmonia novaehebridensis is a species of beetle of the family Coccinellidae. It is found in Vanuatu.

== Description ==
Adults reach a length of about 5.4 mm (0.21 in). The head, antennae, legs and pronotum are light reddish to light brown, while the scutellum is reddish with black borders. The elytra are reddish with three bands and reddish suture in males, while it is black in females. The ventral surface is mostly light in colour.
