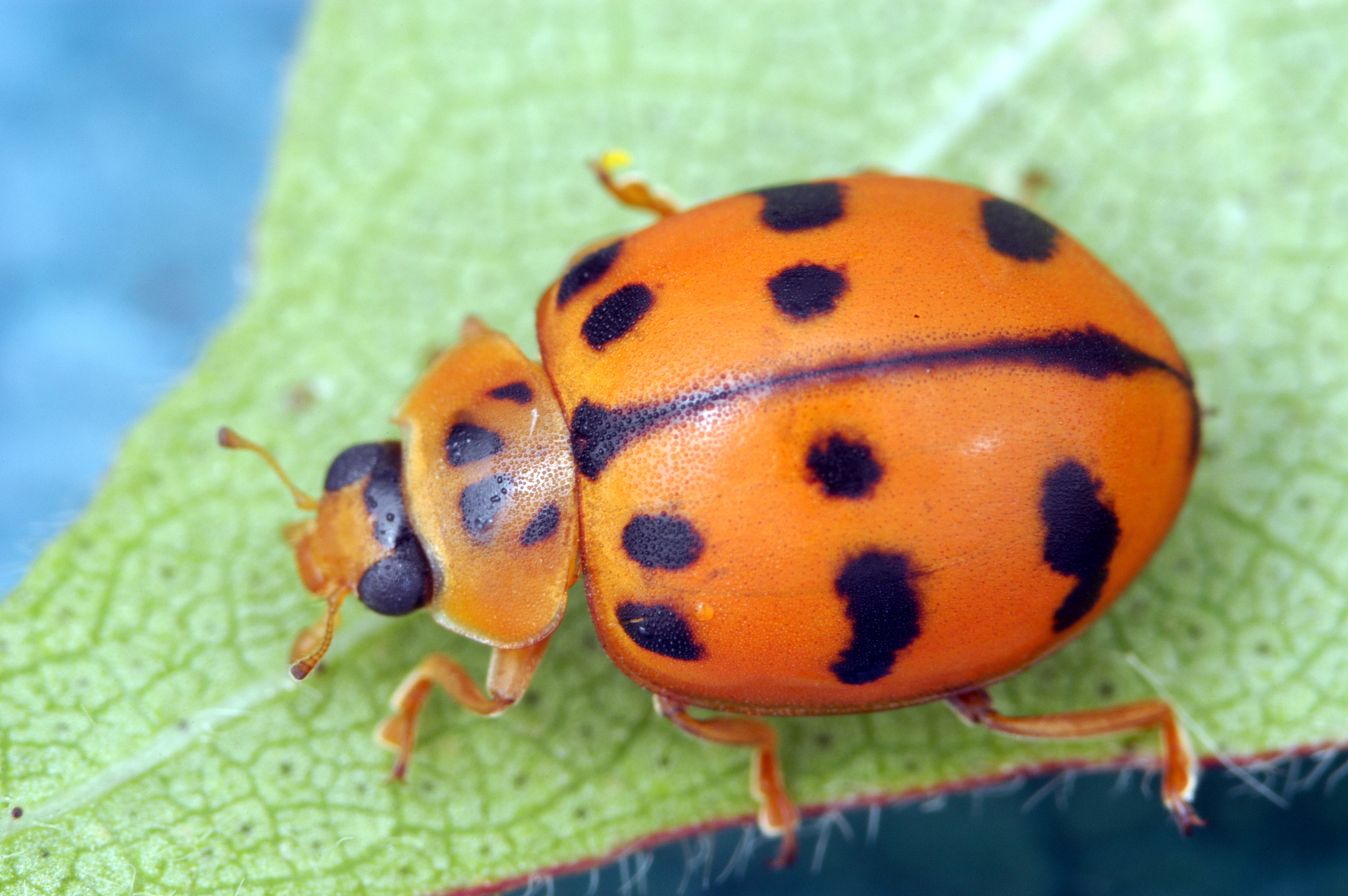

Scientific classification
- Kingdom: Animalia
- Phylum: Arthropoda
- Clade: Pancrustacea
- Class: Insecta
- Order: Coleoptera
- Suborder: Polyphaga
- Infraorder: Cucujiformia
- Family: Coccinellidae
- Genus: Harmonia
- Species: H. octomaculata

Binomial name
- Harmonia octomaculata (Fabricius, 1781)

Synonyms
- Coccinella octomaculata Fabricius, 1781; Coccinella arcuata Fabricii, 1787; Harmonia arcuata (Fabricius, 1787); Coccinella cingulata Fabricius, 1787; Coccinella ungulata Herbst, 1793; Coccinella duodecimnotata Fabricius, 1801; Coccinella rejiciens Walker, 1859; Harmonia soyabinii Sathe & Bhosale, 2002

= Harmonia octomaculata =

Species of beetle

Harmonia octomaculata is a species of ladybird of the family Coccinellidae. It is found throughout India, Pakistan, Nepal, Bangladesh, Sri Lanka, Micronesia, and Australia.

== Description ==
It is a rare species of ladybird which is about 8 mm long. Elytra is yellowish dark orange in color with black dots.

Adult female lays eggs singly or in cluster of 21 to 52 eggs on both surfaces of leaf, or sometimes on the dead aphid body. Eggs are yellowish, and oval shaped. With the development, the eggs turned to black and later become completely black before hatching. The length of eggs are about 1.25 to 1.37 mm. The incubation period varied from 3 to 4 days. After split open the eggs at the apical portion, grubs starts to wriggled out. The neonate grubs remained on egg case for some time and then moved towards prey for feeding. First instar larva is dark greyish and covered with spiny structures all over the body. Head with shiny dark head capsule. Legs are also darker in color which are comparatively longer and articulated with oval shaped body. Body length of the first instar is about 1.75 to 2.08 mm. Duration of first instar larva varies from 1 to 2 days.

Second instar larva is shining black with yellowish head capsule. Later it is turned to dark brown to black in color. Body completely covered with spiny structures. Legs are black. Two orange spots can be observed on darso-lateral side of first abdominal segment. Body ventrally flat and slightly convex dorsally. Average length of second instar is about 3.90 to 4.65 mm. Third instar larva is very similar to second instar larva except larger body size. The spiny structures slightly large. Freshly moulted third instar is dark grey to black with orange spots. These spots intensified on darso-lateral side of first abdominal segment. The length of third instar varies from 5.35 to 6.31 mm.

Fourth instar is deep black to dull black in color before pre pupation. A series of orange spots can be found on first and fourth abdominal segments. The length of fourth instar is about 8.04 to 9.98 mm. The total larval developmental period ranges from 8 to 11 days. The full grown fourth instar larva stops feeding and became sluggish with swollen body. It attaches its posterior abdominal segment with leaf surface. The shape gradually transformed into characteristic ‘C’ shape and becomes pupal stage within a short period of time. There are several orange colored spots on the body. The duration of pre-pupal stage varies from 1 to 2 days. Pupa is initially yellowish and shiny. But it later turns to pale orange yellow. Fully developed pupa is yellowish orange. There are black spots found symmetrically on each segment. Female pupa is comparatively larger than male pupa. Pupal stage lasted for about 3 to 5 days before becoming the adult.

During emergence, adult stays for few hours on the pupal case until the body gets hardened. During this period, it is yellowish orange in color. Newly emerged adults are soft, and yellowish in color. However there are no any markings in newly emerged adults. Later, adults turns to yellowish orange with black spots on pronotum and elytra. Male beetle is small, oval, dorsally convex and ventrally flat. Body length is about 5.22 to 6.20 mm. Pronotum yellowish orange with M-shaped black spots. Some males have been observed without black spots. Elyra yellowish orange with two to four black spots. Sometimes it is without black spots on each proximal end. Female similar to male, but large in size with an average body length from 6.20 to 6.88 mm. The last abdominal segment of female was pointed for egg laying, but the male has a round last abdominal segment. The total life cycle of male is about 42 to 49 days, whereas female is about 49 to 57 days.

== Biology ==
It is a predator of many whiteflies and aphids such as Aphis gossypii, Myzus persicae, Aphis craccivora, Acyrthosiphon pisum and Amrasca. It is also a known predator of Phenacoccus solenopsis a major pest on cotton, and the moth species, Spodoptera frugiperda.
