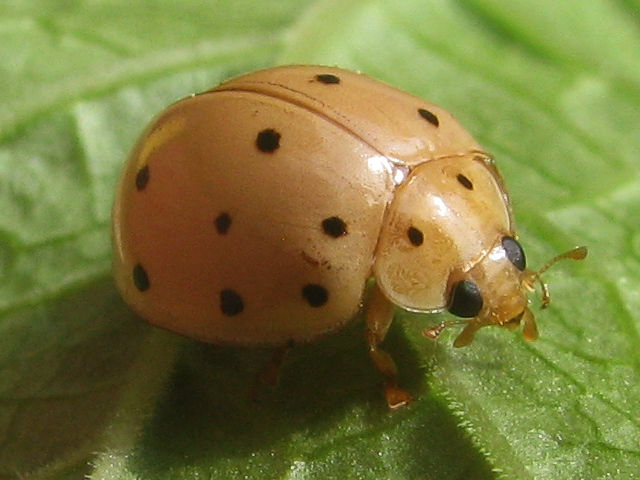

Scientific classification
- Kingdom: Animalia
- Phylum: Arthropoda
- Clade: Pancrustacea
- Class: Insecta
- Order: Coleoptera
- Suborder: Polyphaga
- Infraorder: Cucujiformia
- Family: Coccinellidae
- Genus: Harmonia
- Species: H. sedecimnotata

Binomial name
- Harmonia sedecimnotata (Fabricius, 1801)

Synonyms
- Coccinella sedecimnotata Fabricius, 1801; Callineda sedecimnotata (Fabricius, 1801); Daulis 16-notata (Fabricius, 1801)

= Harmonia sedecimnotata =

Species of beetle

Harmonia sedecimnotata is a species of beetle in the family Coccinellidae. The species is found in southern China, eastern India, Nepal and Southeast Asia. The species is predatory.

== Description ==
Adults reach a length of about 6–7 mm (0.24–0.28 in). They are ochraceous yellow to yellowish brown. The pronotum has two black spots and each elytron has eight black spots.
