= Harmonia areolata =

Scientific classification
- Kingdom: Animalia
- Phylum: Arthropoda
- Clade: Pancrustacea
- Class: Insecta
- Order: Coleoptera
- Suborder: Polyphaga
- Infraorder: Cucujiformia
- Family: Coccinellidae
- Genus: Harmonia
- Species: H. areolata

Binomial name
- Harmonia areolata Bielawski, 1968

Species of beetle

Harmonia areolata is a species of beetle of the family Coccinellidae. It is found in Papua New Guinea and Indonesia (Ambon and Western New Guinea).

== Description ==
Adults reach a length of about 4.2–4.9 mm (0.17–0.19 in). The frons and antennae are yellowish and the eyes are black. The pronotum is yellow with two black stripes. The scutellum is black and the elytra are yellow with a dark pattern and black borders and suture.
