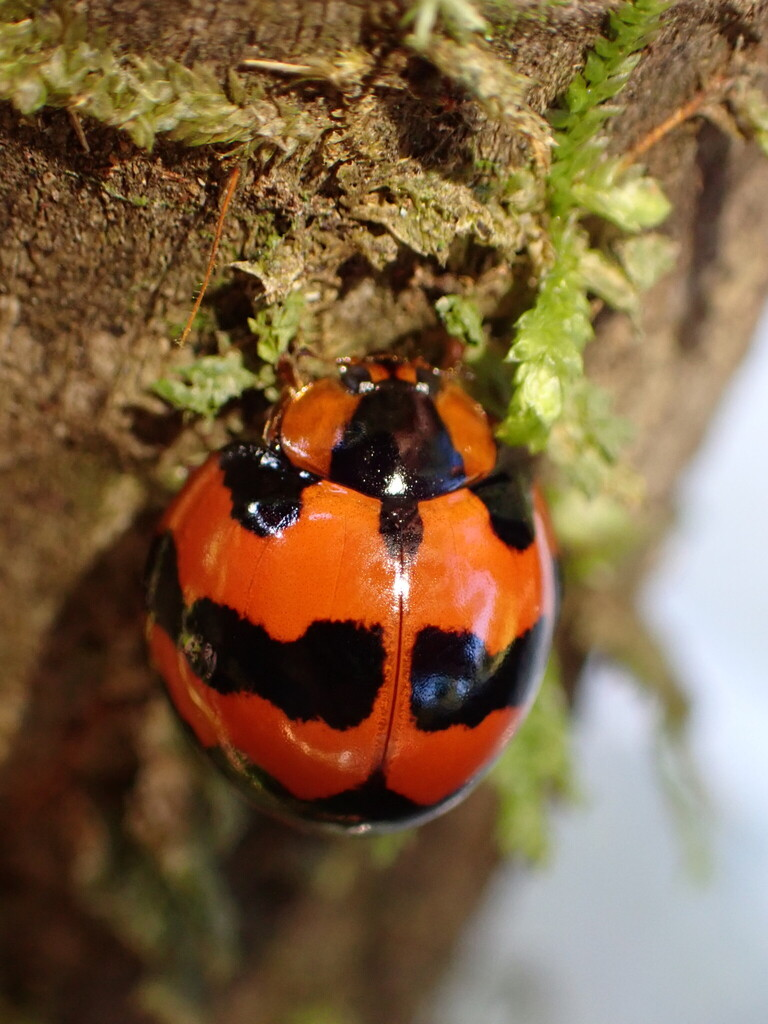

Scientific classification
- Kingdom: Animalia
- Phylum: Arthropoda
- Clade: Pancrustacea
- Class: Insecta
- Order: Coleoptera
- Suborder: Polyphaga
- Infraorder: Cucujiformia
- Family: Coccinellidae
- Genus: Harmonia
- Species: H. manillana

Binomial name
- Harmonia manillana (Mulsant, 1866)

Synonyms
- Caria manillana Mulsant, 1866; Leis atrocincta Mulsant, 1866; Neda paulinae Mulsant, 1866; Leis dunlopi Crotch, 1874; Leis cerasicolor Crotch, 1874; Leis aterrima Crotch, 1874; Leis papuensis Crotch, 1874

= Harmonia manillana =

Species of beetle

Harmonia manillana is a species of beetle of the family Coccinellidae. Its range extends from India (Arunachal Pradesh) and Malaysia to New Guinea.

== Description ==
Adults reach a length of about 7.8–9.8 mm (0.31–0.39 in). The dorsal colour pattern is variable, but the elytra are mostly yellowish or reddish with black spots or transverse bands. The head is reddish, sometimes with a black base. The colour of the pronotum varies from uniform yellow-reddish to black with a pale anterior area. The scutellum is always black.
