= Harmonia tobleri =

Scientific classification
- Kingdom: Animalia
- Phylum: Arthropoda
- Clade: Pancrustacea
- Class: Insecta
- Order: Coleoptera
- Suborder: Polyphaga
- Infraorder: Cucujiformia
- Family: Coccinellidae
- Genus: Harmonia
- Species: H. tobleri

Binomial name
- Harmonia tobleri Ślipiński, Li & Pang, 2020

Species of beetle

Harmonia tobleri is a species of beetle of the family Coccinellidae. It is found on the Solomon Islands.

== Description ==
Adults reach a length of about 6.5–8.5 mm (0.26–0.33 in). The head is reddish and the pronotum is black with a pale antero-lateral area. The scutellum is black and the elytra are black, each elytron with two yellowish or reddish markings, as well as with a large basal area and a smaller spot apically.

== Etymology ==
The species is named after James E. Tobler, who collected the holotype.
