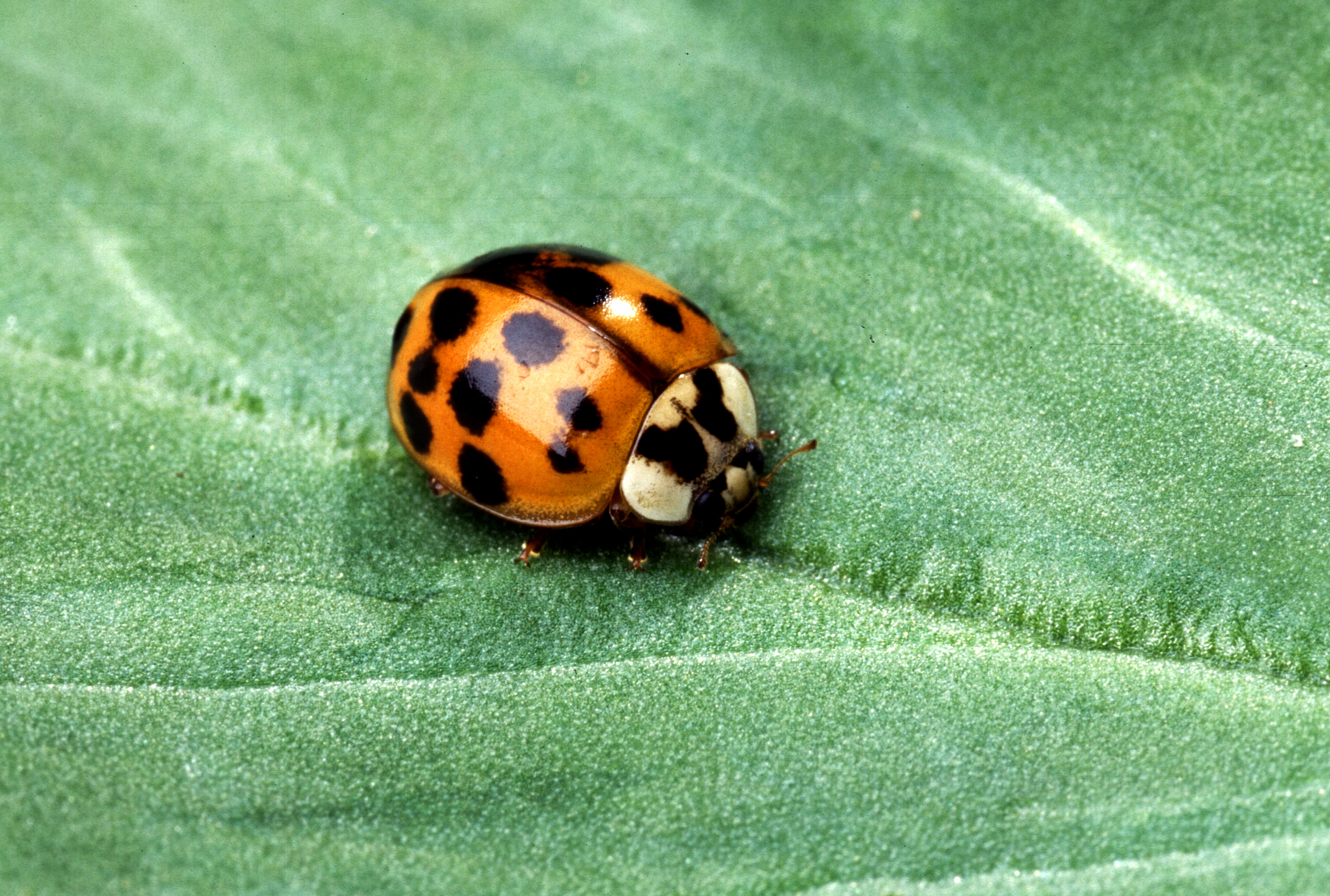
- Asian lady beetle, Harmonia axyridis
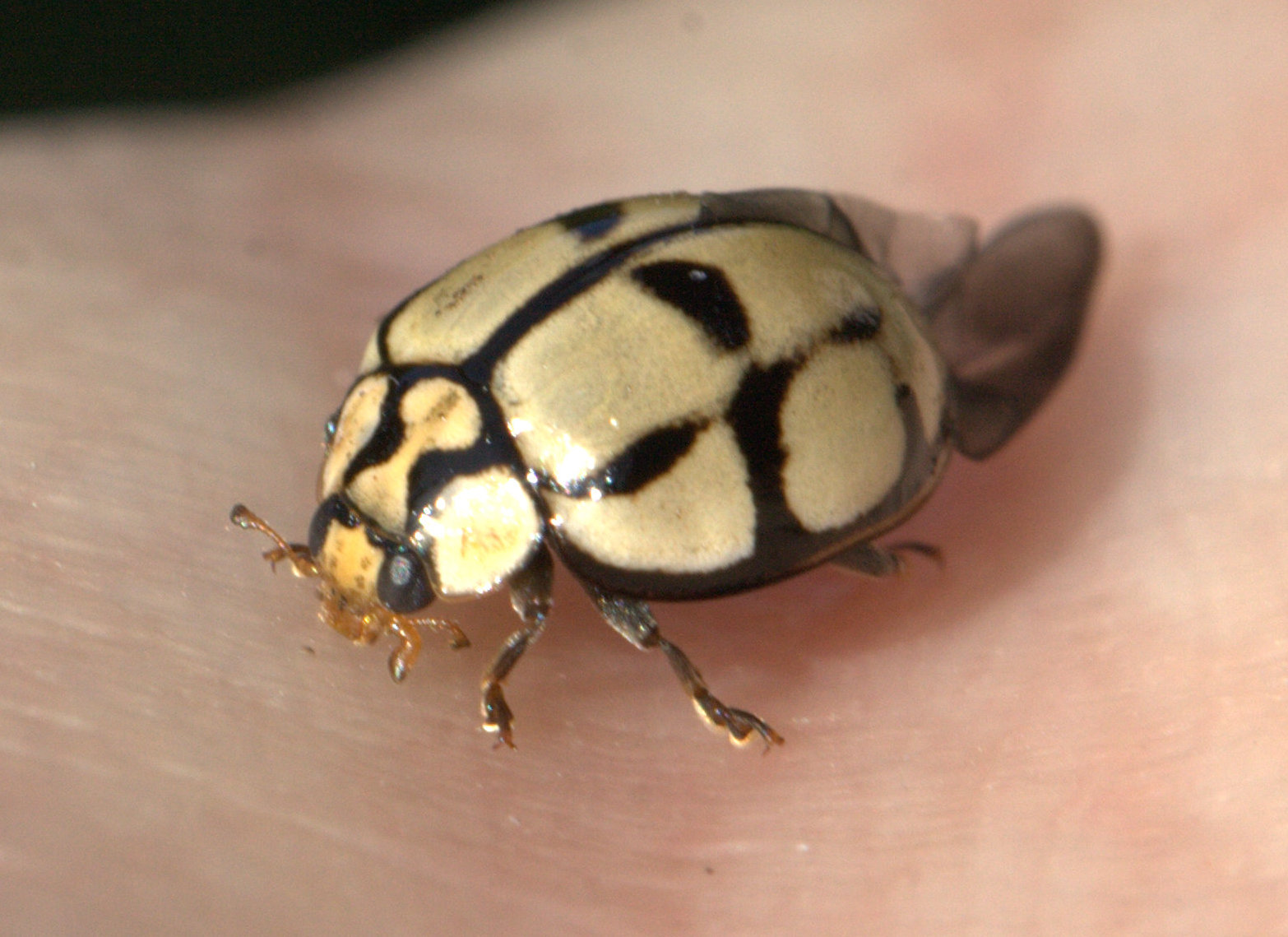
- Harmonia testudinaria

Scientific classification
- Kingdom: Animalia
- Phylum: Arthropoda
- Clade: Pancrustacea
- Class: Insecta
- Order: Coleoptera
- Suborder: Polyphaga
- Infraorder: Cucujiformia
- Family: Coccinellidae
- Tribe: Coccinellini
- Genus: Harmonia; Mulsant, 1846

Synonyms
- Ballia Mulsant, 1853; Callineda Crotch, 1871; Leis Mulsant, 1850; Ptychanatis Crotch, 1874; Rhopaloneda Timberlake, 1943; Stictoleis Crotch, 1874

= Harmonia (beetle) =

Genus of beetles

Harmonia is a genus of lady beetles belonging to the subfamily Coccinellinae.

== Description ==
The distinction of the individual species within the genus is often very difficult, and in some cases requires examination of the reproductive system. The coloring and drawing in the genus Harmonia are very variable, not only between species, but also within each species. The basic color of the elytra is usually red to orange with black spots. The patches can be linked together to form black bars. The species can reach a length of 3 to 7 mm. The rear edge of the pronotum is slightly curved. The antennae are a little shorter than the head and are composed of eleven segments. The three last segments are thickened at the tip and form a club.

== List of species ==
- Harmonia andamanensis Poorani, 2023
- Harmonia antipodum (White, 1848) – antipodean ladybird, endemic to New Zealand
- Harmonia areolata Bielawski & Chûjô, 1968
- Harmonia axyridis (Pallas, 1771) – Asian lady beetle, originally from Nepal, China, Taiwan, Japan, introduced to Western Europe and America
- Harmonia basinotata Bielawski, 1964 – New Guinea
- Harmonia bicolor (Blackburn, 1892) – Australia
- Harmonia boothi Ślipiński, Li & Pang, 2020
- Harmonia boulardi (Mulsant, 1850)
- Harmonia conformis (Boisduval, 1835) – common spotted lady beetle, Australia, introduced in New Zealand
- Harmonia coryphaea (Guérin-Méneville, 1844)
- Harmonia crucigera (Gyllenhaal, 1808)
- Harmonia decussata (Crotch, 1874)
- Harmonia deyrollii (Crotch, 1874)
- Harmonia dimidiata (Fabricius, 1781) – India, Pakistan, Nepal, Bhutan, China, Taiwan, Japan; introduced in North America
- Harmonia eucharis (Mulsant, 1850) – India, Pakistan, Myanmar, Nepal, Himalayan Region, South China
- Harmonia expallida (Weise, 1907) – India
- Harmonia fijiensis (Sicard, 1929)
- Harmonia gilvella Fürsch, 2001
- Harmonia instabilis (Mulsant, 1850)
- Harmonia lapeyrousei (Boisduval, 1835)
- Harmonia manillana (Mulsant, 1866)
- Harmonia micra Ślipiński, Li & Pang, 2020
- Harmonia nagaii Miyatake, 1980
- Harmonia nigromarginata Bielawski & Chûjô, 1968
- Harmonia novaehebridensis (Korschefsky, 1943)
- Harmonia ocellata (Mader, 1955)
- Harmonia octomaculata (Fabricius, 1781) – India, Pakistan, Nepal, Bangladesh, Sri Lanka, Micronesia, Australia
- Harmonia oculata (Hoang, 1983)
- Harmonia ohlmusi Ślipiński, Li & Pang, 2020
- Harmonia pardalina (Gerstäcker, 1871)
- Harmonia problematica (Fürsch, 1963)
- Harmonia quadripunctata (Pontoppidan, 1763) – cream-streaked lady beetle, Europe
- Harmonia rugulosa Sicard, 1912
- Harmonia sedecimnotata (Fabricius, 1801) – India, Nepal, Southeast Asia
- Harmonia shoichii Sasaji, 1988
- Harmonia testudinaria (Mulsant, 1850) – Indonesia, New Guinea, North Australia
- Harmonia thonningii (Mulsant, 1850)
- Harmonia tobleri Ślipiński, Li & Pang, 2020
- Harmonia tricolor (Korschefsky, 1944)
- Harmonia vigintiduomaculata (Fabricius, 1792)
- Harmonia yedoensis (Takizawa, 1917) (= H.fallaciosa) – Japan
