= Harmonia tricolor =

Scientific classification
- Kingdom: Animalia
- Phylum: Arthropoda
- Clade: Pancrustacea
- Class: Insecta
- Order: Coleoptera
- Suborder: Polyphaga
- Infraorder: Cucujiformia
- Family: Coccinellidae
- Genus: Harmonia
- Species: H. tricolor

Binomial name
- Harmonia tricolor (Korschefsky, 1944)

Synonyms
- Coelophora tricolor Korschefsky, 1944

Species of beetle

Harmonia tricolor is a species of beetle of the family Coccinellidae. It is found on the Solomon Islands.

== Description ==
Adults reach a length of about 5.7–7.8 mm (0.22–0.31 in). The frons and antennae are dark yellow and the pronotum is light yellow with a black central area and lateral borders. The scutellum is black and the elytra are red or yellow, with the shoulder area and central area black and the borders and suture yellow. The ventral surface is mostly black and the legs are yellow.
