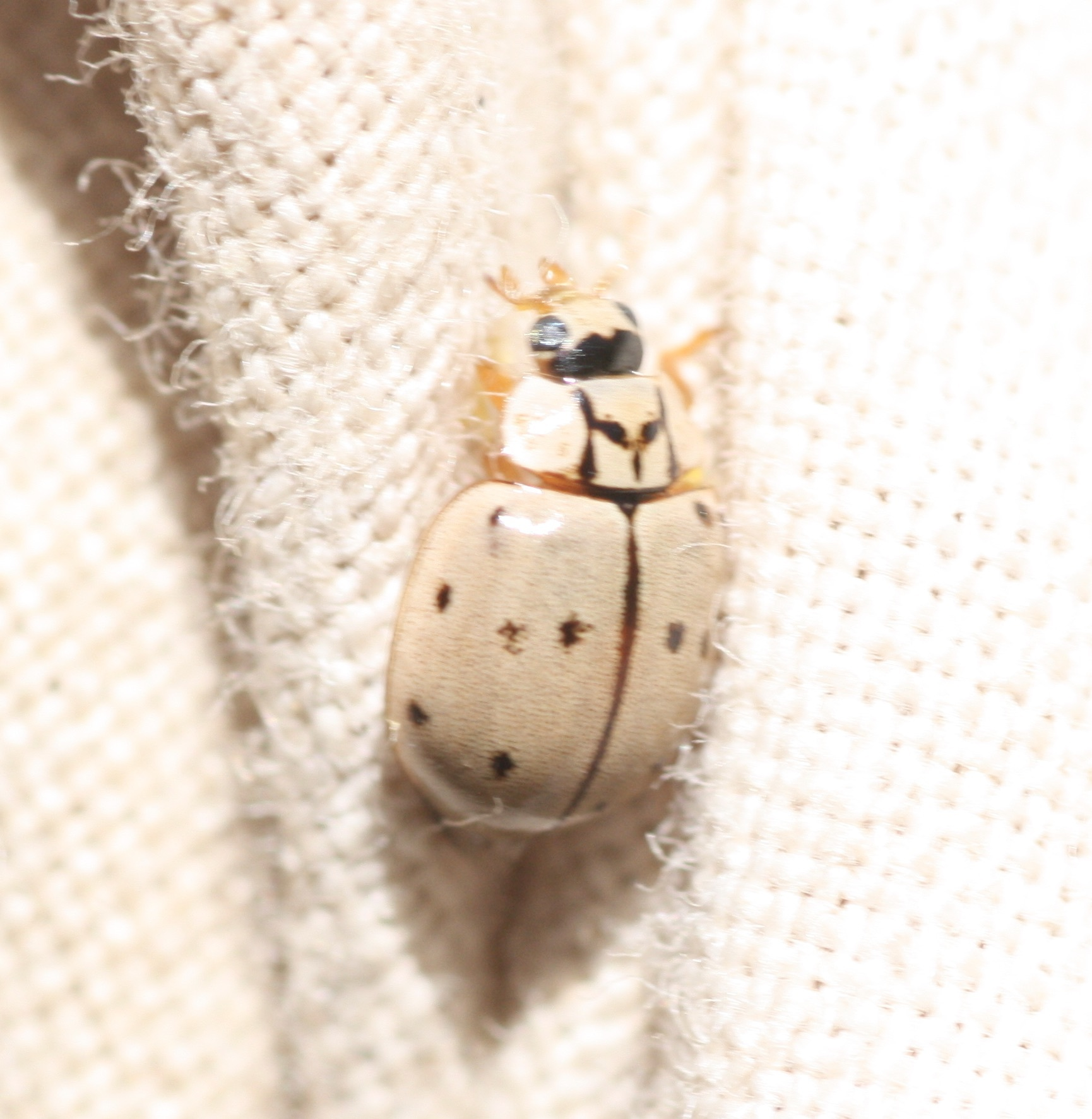

Scientific classification
- Kingdom: Animalia
- Phylum: Arthropoda
- Clade: Pancrustacea
- Class: Insecta
- Order: Coleoptera
- Suborder: Polyphaga
- Infraorder: Cucujiformia
- Family: Coccinellidae
- Genus: Mulsantina
- Species: M. cyathigera

Binomial name
- Mulsantina cyathigera (Gorham, 1891)

Synonyms
- Coccinella cyathigera Gorham, 1891

= Mulsantina cyathigera =

Species of beetle

Mulsantina cyathigera is a species of lady beetle in the family Coccinellidae. It is found in Central America and North America, from Guatemala through Mexico to southern United States.

== Description ==
It measures 3.3–4.7 mm (0.13–0.19 in) in length. Adults are yellow. The pronotum has a brown M-shaped marking. The elytron has six brown spots.
