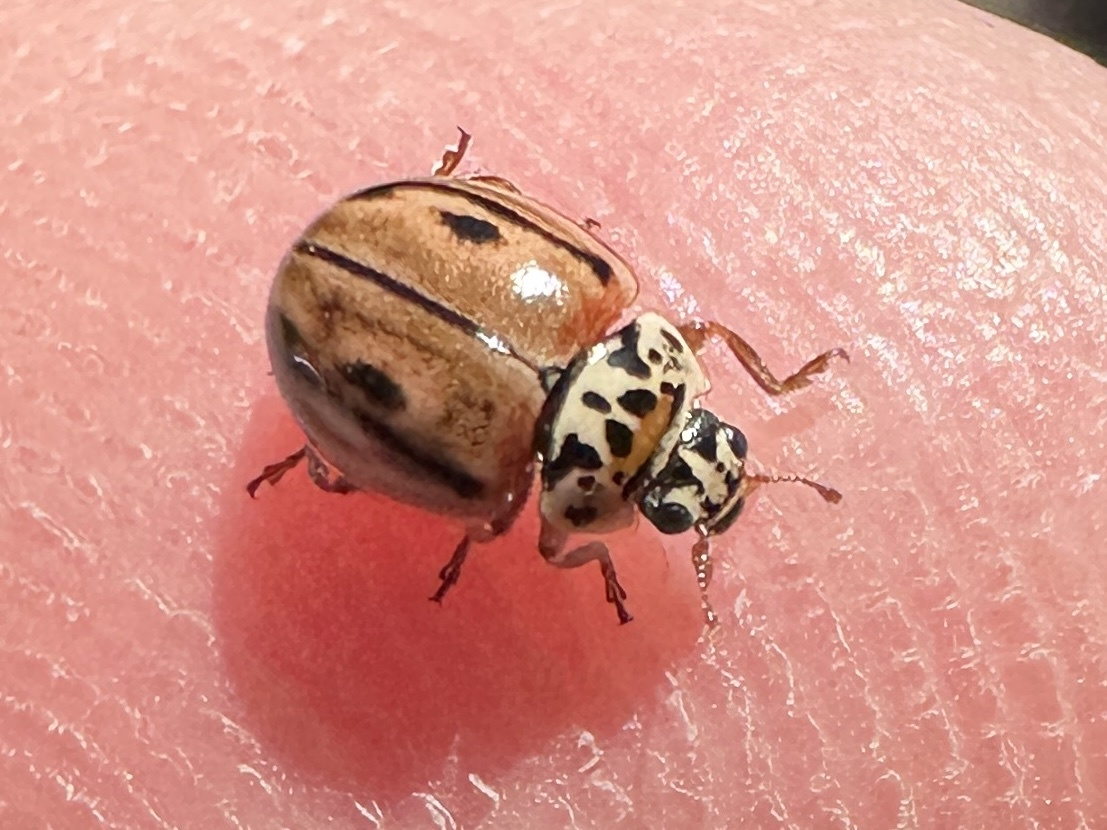

Scientific classification
- Kingdom: Animalia
- Phylum: Arthropoda
- Clade: Pancrustacea
- Class: Insecta
- Order: Coleoptera
- Suborder: Polyphaga
- Infraorder: Cucujiformia
- Family: Coccinellidae
- Genus: Mulsantina
- Species: M. hudsonica

Binomial name
- Mulsantina hudsonica (Casey, 1899)

Synonyms
- Cleis hudsonica Casey 1899

= Mulsantina hudsonica =

Species of beetle

Mulsantina hudsonica, the Hudsonian lady beetle, is a species of lady beetle in the family Coccinellidae. It is found in North America, where it has been recorded from Labrador to North Carolina, west to British Columbia.

== Description ==
It measures 3.5–5 mm (0.1–0.2 in) in length. Adults are yellow except with two black lines on the head. The pronotum has black spots forming an M-shape. The elytron has median brown vitta and two black spots.

== Biology ==
It has been recorded from various conifers and from willow; it is a predator of the balsam woolly adelgid (Adelges piceae).
