= Harmonia nigromarginata =

Scientific classification
- Kingdom: Animalia
- Phylum: Arthropoda
- Clade: Pancrustacea
- Class: Insecta
- Order: Coleoptera
- Suborder: Polyphaga
- Infraorder: Cucujiformia
- Family: Coccinellidae
- Genus: Harmonia
- Species: H. nigromarginata

Binomial name
- Harmonia nigromarginata Bielawski & Chûjô, 1968

Synonyms
- Harmonia rhopalocera Iablokoff-Khnzorian, 1982

Species of beetle

Harmonia nigromarginata is a species of beetle of the family Coccinellidae. It is found in Indonesia (Ambon, Seram and Sulawesi).

== Description ==
Adults reach a length of about 5.2–6.3 mm (0.20–0.25 in). The head and antennae are yellow and the pronotum is yellow with two black fasciae. The scutellum is black or dark brown and the elytra are yellow or brownish, with a black pattern and with dark borders and suture. The ventral surface is brown and the legs are yellow.
