= Mulsantina latifasciata =

Scientific classification
- Kingdom: Animalia
- Phylum: Arthropoda
- Clade: Pancrustacea
- Class: Insecta
- Order: Coleoptera
- Suborder: Polyphaga
- Infraorder: Cucujiformia
- Family: Coccinellidae
- Genus: Mulsantina
- Species: M. latifasciata

Binomial name
- Mulsantina latifasciata González, 2018

Synonyms
- Mulsantina mirifica González, 2015 148 (nec Mulsant, 1850)

Species of beetle

Mulsantina latifasciata is a species of beetle of the family Coccinellidae. It is found in Ecuador.

== Description ==
Adults reach a length of about 6.4 mm. Adults have a yellow head and the pronotum is yellow with a large black basal spot. The elytron is yellow with two black transverse stripes..
