= Harmonia expallida =

Scientific classification
- Kingdom: Animalia
- Phylum: Arthropoda
- Clade: Pancrustacea
- Class: Insecta
- Order: Coleoptera
- Suborder: Polyphaga
- Infraorder: Cucujiformia
- Family: Coccinellidae
- Genus: Harmonia
- Species: H. expallida

Binomial name
- Harmonia expallida (Weise, 1907)

Synonyms
- Coccinella quadripunctata var. expallida Weise, 1907; Harmonia quadripunctata var. expalliata Sicard, 1913; Harmonia breiti Mader, 1931

Species of beetle

Harmonia expallida is a species of beetle of the family Coccinellidae. It is found in India (Himachal Pradesh, Jammu & Kashmir, Uttarakhand), Bhutan, Nepal and Pakistan. It was introduced to North Carolina, but did not establish.

== Description ==
Adults reach a length of about 6–7.5 mm (0.24–0.30 in). The head is dull yellow to pale testaceous, with two black spots. The scutellum is yellow to black and the pronotum has two spots or two black stripes on either side of median line. The elytra are dull yellow, sometimes with black spots.

== Life history ==
They have been recorded preying on Dreyfusia knucheli, Dreyfusia joshii and Adelges abietispiceae, as well as Aphididae species.
