= Harmonia fijiensis =

Scientific classification
- Kingdom: Animalia
- Phylum: Arthropoda
- Clade: Pancrustacea
- Class: Insecta
- Order: Coleoptera
- Suborder: Polyphaga
- Infraorder: Cucujiformia
- Family: Coccinellidae
- Genus: Harmonia
- Species: H. fijiensis

Binomial name
- Harmonia fijiensis (Sicard, 1929)

Synonyms
- Synharmonia fijiensis Sicard, 1929

Species of beetle

Harmonia fijiensis is a species of beetle of the family Coccinellidae. It is found in Fiji.

== Description ==
Adults reach a length of about 5.3–6.5 mm (0.21–0.26 in). The frons, antennae and legs are yellow or orange, while the pronotum is orange with a medial black mark. The elytra are orange with a black stripe and two sets of spots.
