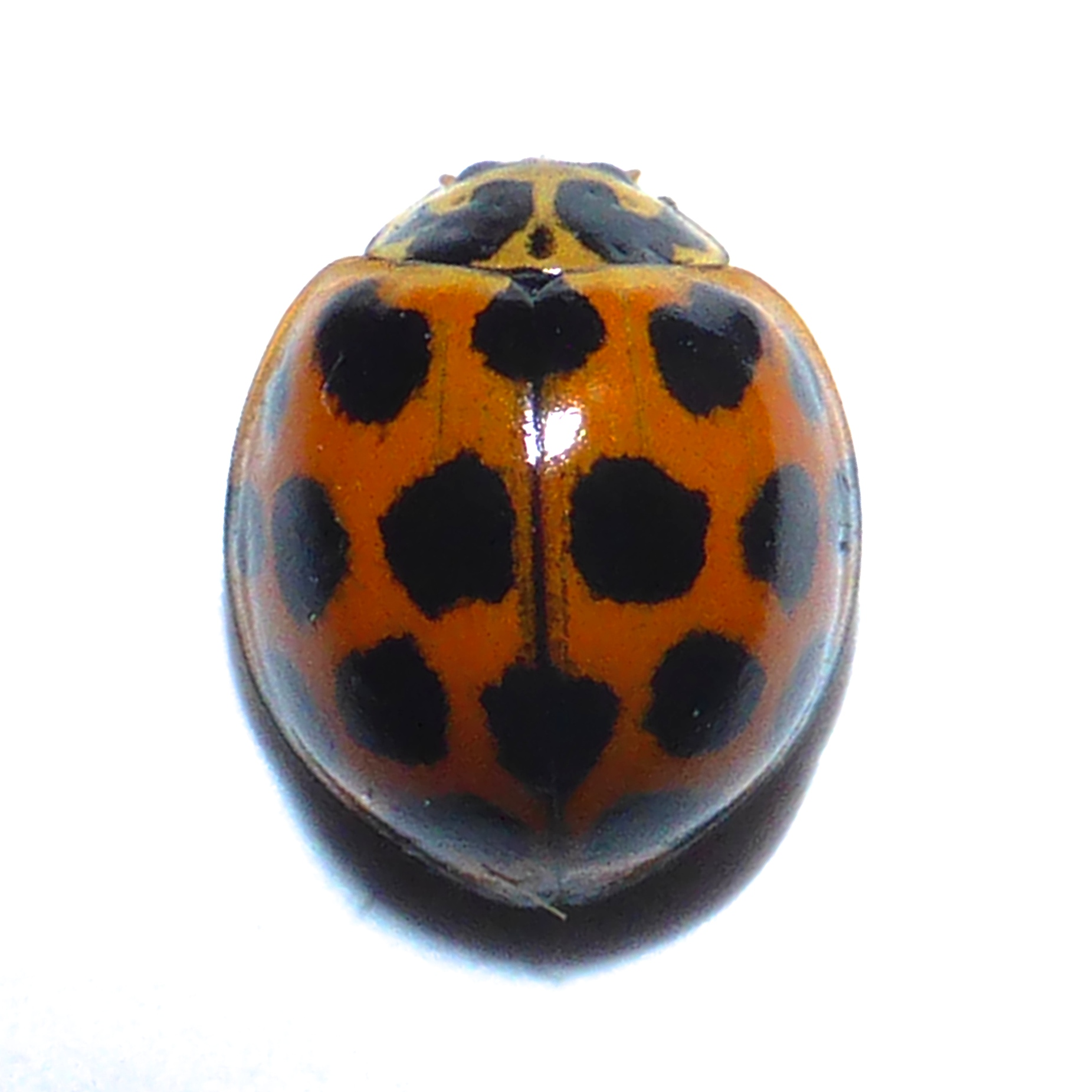

Scientific classification
- Kingdom: Animalia
- Phylum: Arthropoda
- Clade: Pancrustacea
- Class: Insecta
- Order: Coleoptera
- Suborder: Polyphaga
- Infraorder: Cucujiformia
- Family: Coccinellidae
- Genus: Harmonia
- Species: H. conformis

Binomial name
- Harmonia conformis (Boisduval, 1835)

Synonyms
- Coccinella conformis Boisduval, 1835; Leis conformis var. occidentalis Lea, 1902

= Harmonia conformis =

Species of beetle

Harmonia conformis, the large spotted ladybird, is a species of ladybird (the family Coccinellidae). It has a light reddish appearance and its colouration includes 20 large black spots, 18 of which are found on the elytra (wing covers). They are quite large for ladybirds, being about 6–7 mm long. It is a predator of other insects, eating aphids as both a larva and imago (adult). It is found in Australia, and has been introduced to New Zealand, where it is common in northern regions. Another member of the same genus, Harmonia antipodum, also occurs in New Zealand. This species, however, is a native and is much smaller and harder to find.

== Life cycle ==
This ladybird has annual cycle where the duration of each life stages is dependent on the temperature of the environment. Their life cycle begins with the deposition of yellow eggs by the female in an area where there are prey readily available for the larvae once they have hatched. As larvae, they proceed through four instars. The first instar is dark grey with black legs and prothorax, and the scoli (flesh extensions with setae) are black. The second instar instead has white-yellowish scoli. The third and fourth instars have variable colouration: the prothorax may be black or yellow, the scoli on the first and fourth abdominal segments are usually yellow, and the scoli on the fifth to seventh abdominal segments may be black or yellow. Once the larva is fully grown, it attaches itself to a plant to form its pupa. The adults then hatch from this pupa and begin to seek out mates.
