= Harmonia ohlmusi =

Scientific classification
- Kingdom: Animalia
- Phylum: Arthropoda
- Clade: Pancrustacea
- Class: Insecta
- Order: Coleoptera
- Suborder: Polyphaga
- Infraorder: Cucujiformia
- Family: Coccinellidae
- Genus: Harmonia
- Species: H. ohlmusi

Binomial name
- Harmonia ohlmusi Ślipiński, Li & Pang, 2020

Species of beetle

Harmonia ohlmusi is a species of beetle of the family Coccinellidae. It is found in Indonesia (Western New Guinea) and Papua New Guinea.

== Description ==
Adults reach a length of about 6–9 mm (0.24–0.35 in). The frons is brown, sometimes with dark brown lateral and anterior borders. The pronotum is black with two light yellow spots and with partially black lateral borders. The scutellum is black and the elytra are either completely black, or with two orange or reddish spots on each elytron. The venter surface is mostly black.

== Etymology ==
The species is named after Henry V. Ohlmus, who has collected the holotype of this species.
