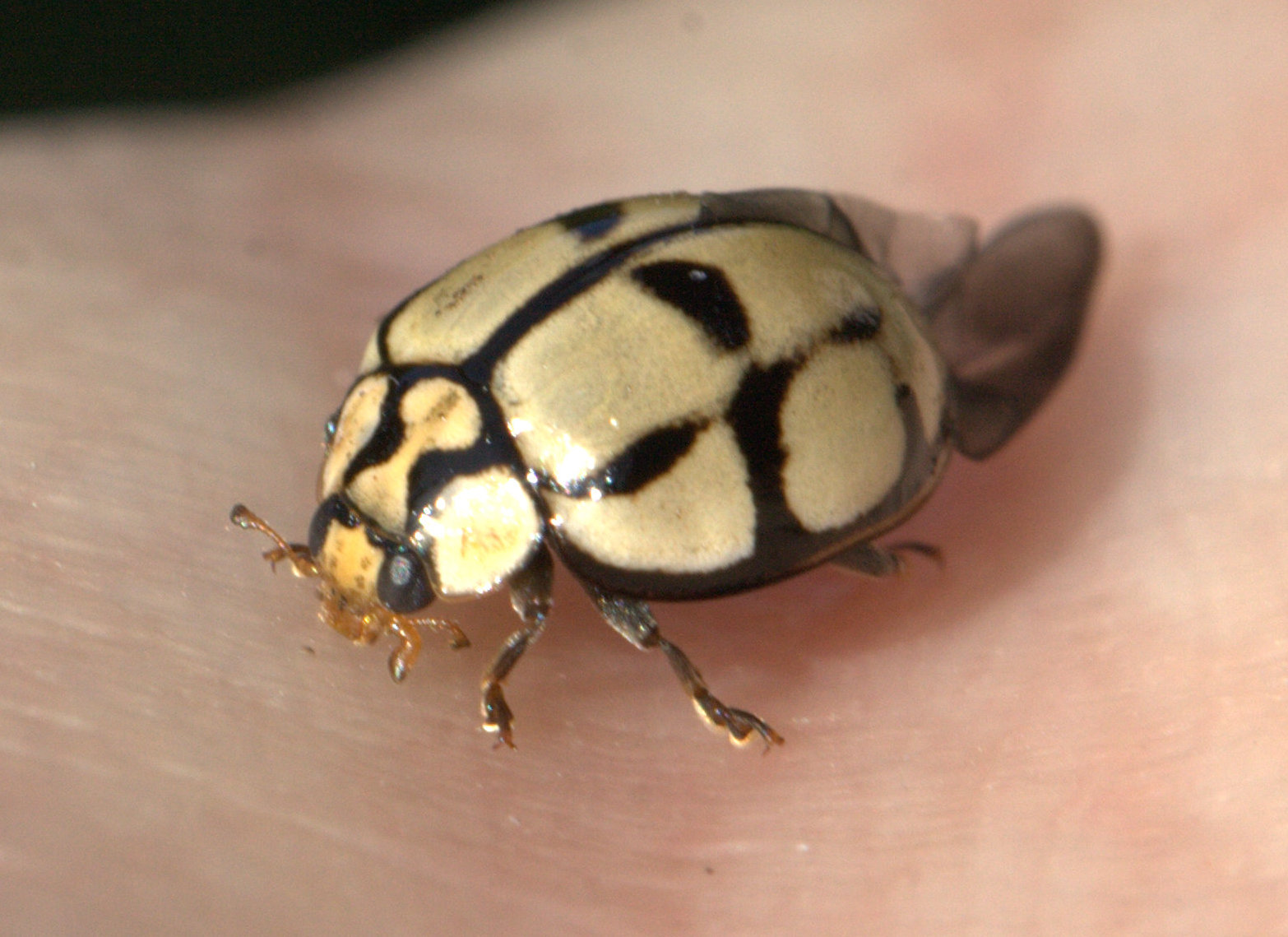

Scientific classification
- Kingdom: Animalia
- Phylum: Arthropoda
- Clade: Pancrustacea
- Class: Insecta
- Order: Coleoptera
- Suborder: Polyphaga
- Infraorder: Cucujiformia
- Family: Coccinellidae
- Genus: Harmonia
- Species: H. testudinaria

Binomial name
- Harmonia testudinaria (Mulsant, 1850)

Synonyms
- Daulis testudinaria Mulsant, 1850; Callineda testudinaria (Mulsant, 1850); Neda testudinaria (Mulsant, 1850)

= Harmonia testudinaria =

Species of beetle

Harmonia testudinaria, commonly known as the tortoise-shelled ladybird, is a species of ladybird belonging to the family Coccinellidae. The tortoise shelled-ladybird occurs in Australia, New Guinea, Indonesia and (via introduction) Hawaii.

== Description ==
Adult H. testudinaria are beetles about 6 mm long and yellow/light orange with a black net pattern on the elytra. There are also two black stripes running across the pronotum. Adults are entirely yellow when they first emerge, developing their black markings later. There is some intraspecific variation, with adults from New Guinea generally having elytra mostly of one colour except for a black suture and small black spots at the elytral bases.

The larvae are brownish with some creamy markings, while the pupae are orange-yellow.

== Habitat ==
This species can be found on the leaves and stems of plants.

== Diet ==
Tortoise-shelled ladybirds feed on aphids and other insects. One of their prey species is the giant willow aphid, Tuberolachnus salignus.

== Life cycle ==
Harmonia testudinaria begin their life cycle as eggs laid on suitable plants. These hatch into larvae, which moult several times before becoming pupae. After a few days, adults emerge from pupae.
