= Harmonia basinotata =

Scientific classification
- Kingdom: Animalia
- Phylum: Arthropoda
- Clade: Pancrustacea
- Class: Insecta
- Order: Coleoptera
- Suborder: Polyphaga
- Infraorder: Cucujiformia
- Family: Coccinellidae
- Genus: Harmonia
- Species: H. basinotata

Binomial name
- Harmonia basinotata Bielawski, 1964

Synonyms
- Harmonia uninotata Bielawski, 1964

Species of beetle

Harmonia basinotata is a species of beetle of the family Coccinellidae. It is found in Papua New Guinea.

== Description ==
Adults reach a length of about 5.5–7.1 mm (0.22–0.28 in). The frons is yellow with a black anterior margin and the antennae are dark. The pronotum is yellow with black paired patches. The scutellum is black and the elytra are yellow with two or six black spots on each elytron. The legs and ventral surface are black.
