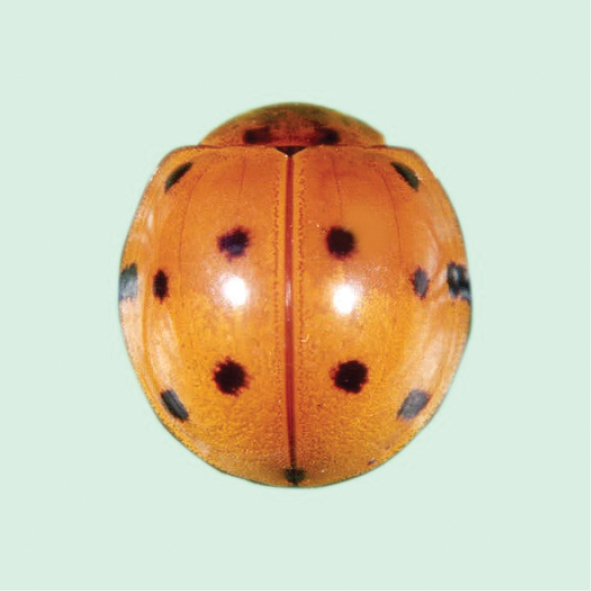

Scientific classification
- Kingdom: Animalia
- Phylum: Arthropoda
- Clade: Pancrustacea
- Class: Insecta
- Order: Coleoptera
- Suborder: Polyphaga
- Infraorder: Cucujiformia
- Family: Coccinellidae
- Genus: Harmonia
- Species: H. dimidiata

Binomial name
- Harmonia dimidiata (Fabricius, 1781)

Synonyms
- Coccinella dimidiata Fabricius, 1781; Coccinella quindecimmaculata Hope, 1831; Coccinella quindecimspilota Hope, 1831; Coccinella dimidia Hope, 1831; Coccinella bicolor Hope, 1831; Synonycha kikuchii Ohta, 1929

= Harmonia dimidiata =

Species of insect

Harmonia dimidiata is a species of lady beetle in the family Coccinellidae. It is found in North America and Southern Asia.

== Description ==
Adults reach a length of about 7.4-10 mm. Adults are reddish yellow with black markings.
