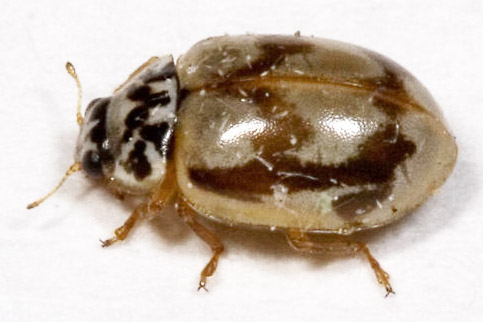
- Mulsantina picta

Scientific classification
- Kingdom: Animalia
- Phylum: Arthropoda
- Clade: Pancrustacea
- Class: Insecta
- Order: Coleoptera
- Suborder: Polyphaga
- Infraorder: Cucujiformia
- Family: Coccinellidae
- Tribe: Coccinellini
- Genus: Mulsantina; Weise, 1906

Synonyms
- Cleis Mulsant, 1850 (preocc.); Pseudocleis Casey, 1908

= Mulsantina =

Genus of beetles

Mulsantina is a genus of ladybugs (family Coccinellidae), found in North and Central America and in the Caribbean (Haiti).

The genus was named by entomologist Julius Weise after Étienne Mulsant, who in 1846 and 1850 published monographs that were very important to the development of modern coccinellid taxonomy. Mulsant had previously named this genus Cleis, but as this name was found to be already in use, Weise renamed it in Mulsant's honor.

== Species ==
There are about nine species:

- Mulsantina alejandroi Bustamante, Oróz & González, 2021
- Mulsantina curva J. Chapin, 1985
- Mulsantina cyathigera Gorham, 1891
- Mulsantina hudsonica Casey, 1899
- Mulsantina labyrinthica Sicard, 1929
- Mulsantina latifasciata González, 2018
- Mulsantina luteodorsa J. Chapin, 1973
- Mulsantina lynx Mulsant, 1850
- Mulsantina mexicana J. Chapin, 1985
- Mulsantina picta Randall, 1838
- Mulsantina quinquelineata Mulsant, 1850
