= Harmonia decussata =

Scientific classification
- Kingdom: Animalia
- Phylum: Arthropoda
- Clade: Pancrustacea
- Class: Insecta
- Order: Coleoptera
- Suborder: Polyphaga
- Infraorder: Cucujiformia
- Family: Coccinellidae
- Genus: Harmonia
- Species: H. decussata

Binomial name
- Harmonia decussata (Crotch, 1874)

Synonyms
- Callineda decussata Crotch, 1874; Harmonia flavomarginata Bielawski & Chûjô, 1968; Harmonia incognita Chazeau, 1989

Species of beetle

Harmonia decussata is a species of beetle of the family Coccinellidae. It is found in Indonesia (Western New Guinea, Ambon, Seram, Kai Islands), Papua New Guinea and the Solomon Islands.

== Description ==
Adults reach a length of about 5.3–6.7 mm (0.21–0.26 in). The head and antennae are yellow or reddish and the scutellum is black. The ventral surface is brown and the legs are yellow. There are two types of colour patterns on the pronotum and elytra. The typical form has a yellow pronotum with two black stripes. In this form, the elytra are yellow or reddish with a black suture and sometimes a black pattern. The other form has a reddish or yellow pronotum (sometimes with two vague black stripes) and the elytra are black or dark brown with a reddish or yellow spot and one or two basal reddish markings.
