= Harmonia boothi =

Scientific classification
- Kingdom: Animalia
- Phylum: Arthropoda
- Clade: Pancrustacea
- Class: Insecta
- Order: Coleoptera
- Suborder: Polyphaga
- Infraorder: Cucujiformia
- Family: Coccinellidae
- Genus: Harmonia
- Species: H. boothi

Binomial name
- Harmonia boothi Ślipiński, Li & Pang, 2020

Species of beetle

Harmonia boothi is a species of beetle of the family Coccinellidae. It is found in Indonesia (Seram).

== Description ==
Adults reach a length of about 8.7–10.2 mm (0.34–0.40 in). The frons and antennae are light yellow and the pronotum is light yellow with two black stripes. The elytra are light yellow and semi-transparent and have black humeral fascia and two black markings on each elytron. Furthermore, the borders are yellow or slightly brown and the suture is black. The scutellum is light yellow with black lateral borders.

== Etymology ==
The species is named after Roger G. Booth, who identified this species as undescribed in the BMNH collections.
