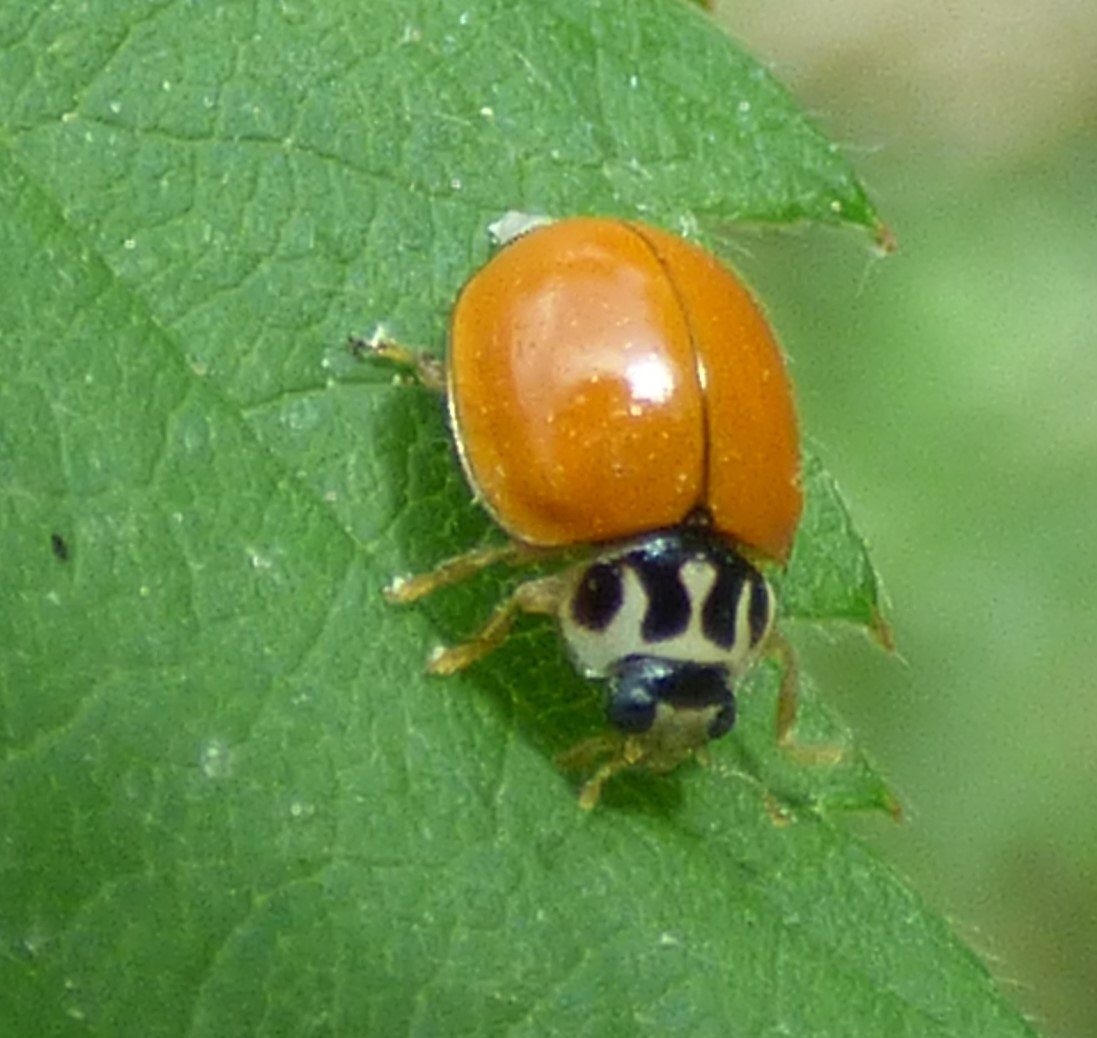

Scientific classification
- Kingdom: Animalia
- Phylum: Arthropoda
- Clade: Pancrustacea
- Class: Insecta
- Order: Coleoptera
- Suborder: Polyphaga
- Infraorder: Cucujiformia
- Family: Coccinellidae
- Genus: Mulsantina
- Species: M. luteodorsa

Binomial name
- Mulsantina luteodorsa J. Chapin, 1973

= Mulsantina luteodorsa =

Species of beetle

Mulsantina luteodorsa, the clay-colored lady beetle, is a species of lady beetle in the family Coccinellidae. It is endemic to southeastern United States.

== Description ==
It measures 3.8–4.6 mm (0.1–0.2 in) in length. The pronotum is yellow with two black vitta. The elytron is without any markings.
