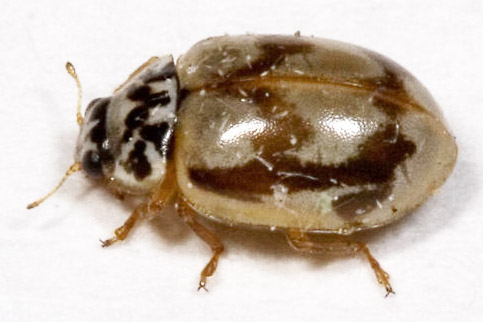

Scientific classification
- Kingdom: Animalia
- Phylum: Arthropoda
- Clade: Pancrustacea
- Class: Insecta
- Order: Coleoptera
- Suborder: Polyphaga
- Infraorder: Cucujiformia
- Family: Coccinellidae
- Genus: Mulsantina
- Species: M. picta

Binomial name
- Mulsantina picta (Randall, 1838)

Synonyms
- Coccinella picta Randall, 1838; Coccinella concinnata Melsheimer, 1847; Harmonia contexta Mulsant, 1850; Cleis minor Casey, 1899

= Mulsantina picta =

Species of beetle

Mulsantina picta (the painted lady beetle or pine lady beetle) is a species of ladybug belonging to the subfamily Coccinellinae.

== Description ==
Mulsantina picta is a small ladybug, typically 3.3–5.3 millimetres (0.13–0.21 in) long, and 2.2–4.0 millimetres (0.087–0.157 in) wide. The elytral markings are quite variable, and sometimes absent. The pronotal markings are more constant and recognizable.

== Distribution and habitat ==
Mulsantina picta is widespread across the United States and southern Canada. It is especially associated with pine forests, and is an aphid and adelgid predator. This makes M. picta a rather dominant species in older pine trees habitats (since they are a conifer specialist), which are known to have low aphid densities.
