= List of ladybirds and related beetle species recorded in Great Britain =

The following is a list of beetles in the family Coccinellidae recorded in Great Britain. The larger and more conspicuous species are commonly known as ladybirds. For other beetles, see List of beetle species recorded in Britain.

- Coccidula rufa (Herbst, 1783)
- Coccidula scutellata (Herbst, 1783)
- Rhyzobius chrysomeloides (Herbst, 1792)
- Rhyzobius litura (Fabricius, 1787)
- Rhyzobius lophanthae (Blaisdell, 1892)
- Rodolia cardinalis (Mulsant, 1850)
- Clitostethus arcuatus (Rossi, 1794)
- Stethorus punctillum (Weise, 1891)
- Scymnus femoralis (Gyllenhal, 1827)
- Scymnus frontalis (Fabricius, 1787)
- Scymnus interruptus (Goeze, 1777)
- Scymnus jakowlewi Weise, 1892
- Scymnus nigrinus Kugelann, 1794
- Scymnus rubromaculatus (Goeze, 1777)
- Scymnus schmidti Fürsch, 1958
- Scymnus auritus Thunberg, 1795
- Scymnus suturalis Thunberg, 1795
- Scymnus haemorrhoidalis Herbst, 1797
- Scymnus limbatus Stephens, 1832
- Nephus bisignatus (Boheman, 1850)
- Nephus quadrimaculatus (Herbst, 1783)
- Nephus redtenbacheri (Mulsant, 1846)
- Cryptolaemus montrouzieri Mulsant, 1853
- Hyperaspis pseudopustulata Mulsant, 1853
- Platynaspis luteorubra (Goeze, 1777)
- Chilocorus bipustulatus (Linnaeus, 1758)
- Chilocorus renipustulatus (Scriba, 1791)
- Exochomus quadripustulatus (Linnaeus, 1758)
- Coccinula quattuordecimpustulata (Linnaeus, 1758)
- Anisosticta novemdecimpunctata (Linnaeus, 1758)
- Tytthaspis sedecimpunctata (Linnaeus, 1761)
- Myzia oblongoguttata (Linnaeus, 1758)
- Myrrha octodecimguttata (Linnaeus, 1758)
- Propylea quatuordecimpunctata (Linnaeus, 1758)
- Calvia quatuordecimguttata (Linnaeus, 1758)
- Vibidia duodecimguttata (Poda, 1761)
- Halyzia sedecimguttata (Linnaeus, 1758)
- Psyllobora vigintiduopunctata (Linnaeus, 1758)
- Anatis ocellata (Linnaeus, 1758)
- Aphidecta obliterata (Linnaeus, 1758)
- Hippodamia tredecimpunctata (Linnaeus, 1758)
- Hippodamia variegata (Goeze, 1777)
- Coccinella hieroglyphica Linnaeus, 1758
- Coccinella magnifica Redtenbacher, 1843
- Coccinella quinquepunctata Linnaeus, 1758
- Coccinella septempunctata Linnaeus, 1758
- Coccinella undecimpunctata Linnaeus, 1758
- Adalia bipunctata (Linnaeus, 1758)
- Adalia decempunctata (Linnaeus, 1758)
- Harmonia axyridis (Pallas, 1773)
- Harmonia quadripunctata (Pontoppidan, 1763)
- Henosepilachna argus (Geoffory in Fourcroy, 1762)
- Subcoccinella vigintiquatuorpunctata (Linnaeus, 1758)
