= Coccinella johnsoni =

Scientific classification
- Kingdom: Animalia
- Phylum: Arthropoda
- Clade: Pancrustacea
- Class: Insecta
- Order: Coleoptera
- Suborder: Polyphaga
- Infraorder: Cucujiformia
- Family: Coccinellidae
- Genus: Coccinella
- Species: C. johnsoni

Binomial name
- Coccinella johnsoni Casey, 1908

Species of beetle

Coccinella johnsoni is a species of beetle of the family Coccinellidae. It is found in North America, where it has been recorded from Alaska to southern California.

Adults are similar to Coccinella californica, but the markings on the elytron are diffent.
