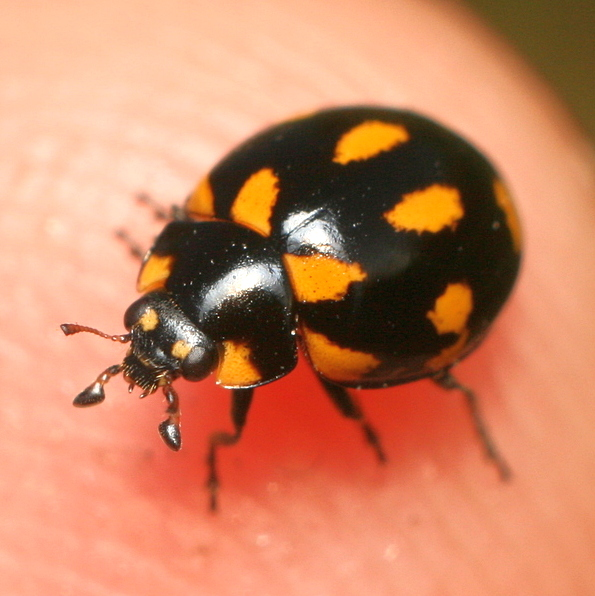

Scientific classification
- Kingdom: Animalia
- Phylum: Arthropoda
- Clade: Pancrustacea
- Class: Insecta
- Order: Coleoptera
- Suborder: Polyphaga
- Infraorder: Cucujiformia
- Family: Coccinellidae
- Genus: Coccinella
- Species: C. leonina

Binomial name
- Coccinella leonina (Fabricius, 1775)

Synonyms
- Coccinella leonina Fabricius, 1775; Coccinella tasmanii White, 1846; Coccinella coriacea Broun, 1893

= Coccinella leonina =

Species of ladybird native to New Zealand

Coccinella leonina, common name orange-spotted ladybird or pāpapa kōpure, is a species of ladybird native to New Zealand. It is black with orange spots. A predator species, it is present in a variety of habitats.

== Taxonomy ==
Coccinella leonina was first described using the modern system of nomenclature in 1775 by Danish zoologist Johan Christian Fabricius. He noted that the species was collected in "nova Hollandia" (Australia), but later authors regard this as an error. The type specimens (the specimens the species description is based on) are stored in the Natural History Museum of London. The species is commonly referred to as the orange-spotted ladybird.

== Description ==
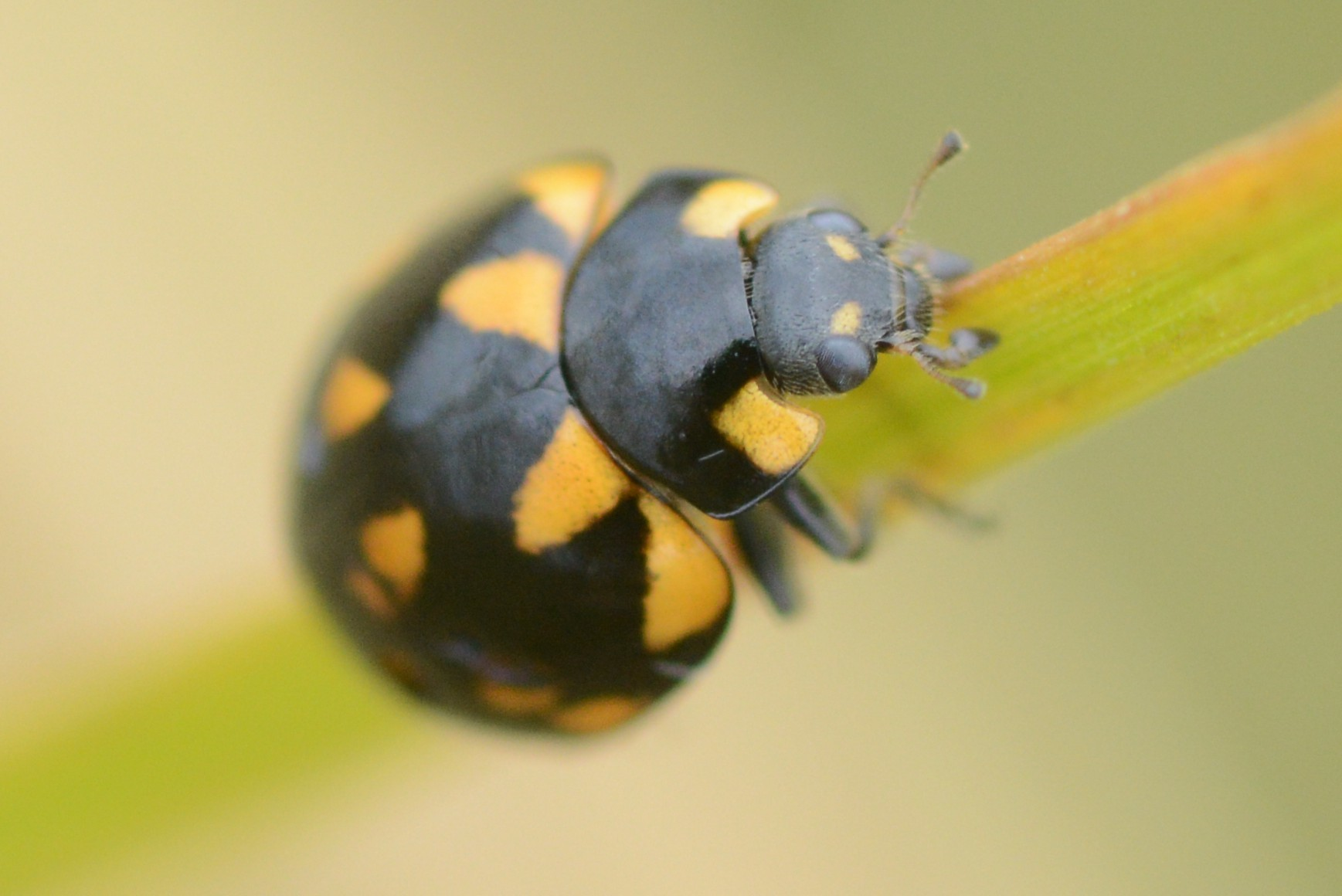

Coccinella leonina or as its common name of orange spotted ladybird suggests, has 16 yellow/orange spots on its black body, with a squarish yellow/orange spot on both sides above the pronotum on the thorax and then 14 other spots on its black elytra which are larger and mostly separated by 1 mm diameter of the black background at the most. It also has a paler blotch above its eyes. The legs and underside are black. Its length typically varies between 4.5 and 5.5 mm long. The elytra is an oval shape that is widest in the middle and the abdomen has slightly different shape between male and female. The abdomen is truncate in males and more rounded in females.

=== Larva ===
Coccinella leonina larva

The larva is dark grey with some small bright orange markings on the head and thorax regions. The first and fourth segments of the abdomen are coloured bright orange and yellow-orange. These markings can be used to distinguish it from the larvae of the eleven-spotted lady beetle (Coccinella undecimpunctata) and the two-spotted lady beetle (Adalia bipunctata), which are similar in appearance and also common in New Zealand.

== Distribution and habitat ==
C. leonina is endemic to New Zealand where it occurs throughout the North Island and South Island. They do not occur on the northern part of the mainland, nor on the mainland of Auckland, Coromandel or Northland. However, they are found on close offshore Islands to the North Island like Poor Knights Island, Hen Island and Chicken Islands, Mokohinau Islands, Great Barrier Island, Little Barrier Island, inner Hauraki Gulf islands, Mercury Island, Aldermen Island and Mayor Island.

It occurs from subalpine altitudes to as low as sea level and is common in areas where they live. It can be found in tussock grasslands and in vegetation that is low down. It is also found in native bush areas, pastures and crops.

== Diet ==
Like other ladybird species, C. leonina feeds on aphids. Some of the species it is known to prey upon includes the cowpea aphid (Aphis craccivora), leaf-curling plum aphid (Brachycaudus helichrysi), cabbage aphid (Brevicoryne brassicae) and woolly apple aphid (Eriosoma lanigerum).

== Predators and parasites ==
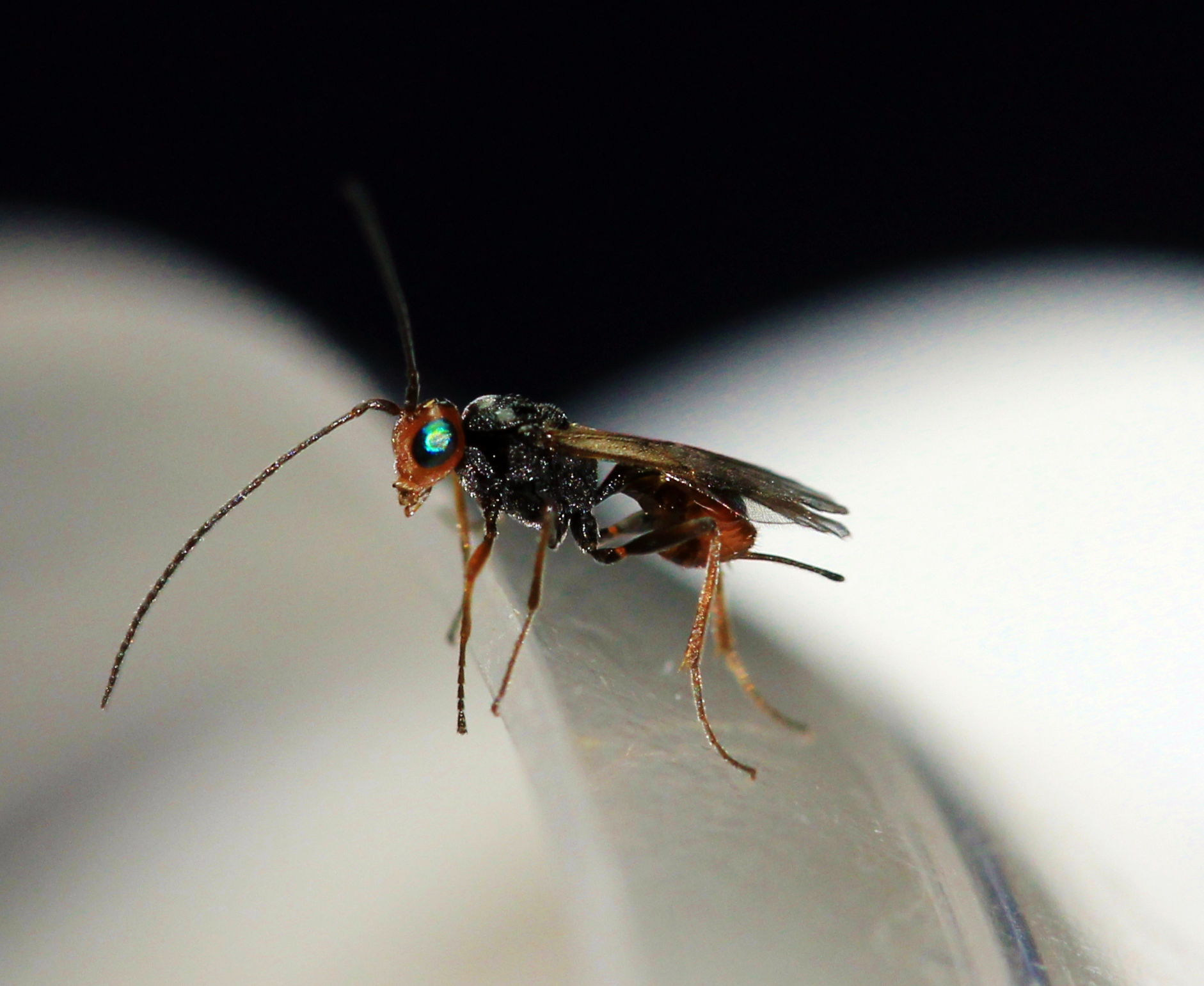
Dinocampus coccinellae, a species of wasp that parasitises Coccinella leonina

Like many other insects, one of the predators to the orange-spotted ladybird are birds. The shining bronze cuckoo (Chalcites lucidus) and the starling (Sturnus vulgaris) are examples that prey upon the species. The braconid wasp Dinocampus coccinellae, which is known to parasitise a wide range of ladybird beetles, is recorded as an parasitoid of C. leonina.
