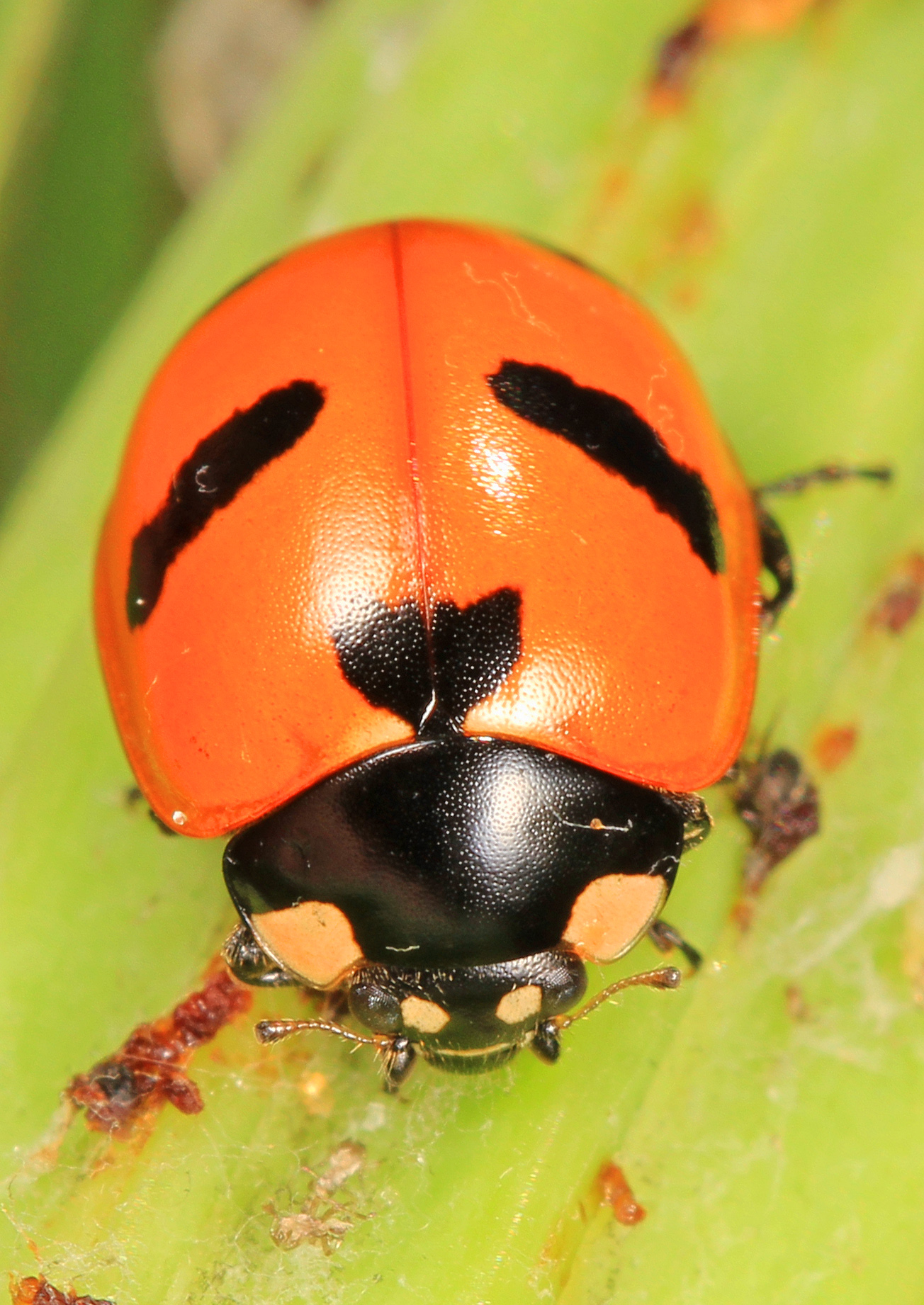

Scientific classification
- Kingdom: Animalia
- Phylum: Arthropoda
- Clade: Pancrustacea
- Class: Insecta
- Order: Coleoptera
- Suborder: Polyphaga
- Infraorder: Cucujiformia
- Family: Coccinellidae
- Genus: Coccinella
- Species: C. monticola

Binomial name
- Coccinella monticola Mulsant, 1850

Synonyms
- Coccinella lacustris LeConte, 1852; Coccinella nevadica Casey, 1899; Coccinella impressa Casey, 1899; Coccinella alutacea Casey, 1899

= Coccinella monticola =

Species of beetle

Coccinella monticola, commonly called the mountain lady beetle or Tamarack ladybug, is a species of lady beetle native to the western United States and Canada, south-eastern Canada and New England states.

== Description ==
This lady beetle ranges from lengths of 5.2 to 7 mm (0.20 to 0.28 in) long. It is a fairly recognizable species having two similar oval spots on either elytron, along with a single spot behind the head. The spots vary in size and roundedness. Though the forewings are generally red, they can be orange or yellow. This species can be confused with Coccinella difficilis.

== Range ==
Coccinella monticola can be found from the Yukon Territory south to New Mexico with Washington and Wisconsin being the berth of the range. A small population can be found from the Great Lakes to Nova Scotia and Massachusetts.
