= Coccinella fulgida =

Scientific classification
- Kingdom: Animalia
- Phylum: Arthropoda
- Clade: Pancrustacea
- Class: Insecta
- Order: Coleoptera
- Suborder: Polyphaga
- Infraorder: Cucujiformia
- Family: Coccinellidae
- Genus: Coccinella
- Species: C. fulgida

Binomial name
- Coccinella fulgida Watson, 1954

Species of beetle

Coccinella fulgida is a species of beetle of the family Coccinellidae. It is found in North America, where it has been recorded from British Columbia, Northwest Territories, Quebec and Alaska.

Adults reach a length of about 4.50–5.60 mm. Adults have a black head with two pale spots. The anterior margin of the pronotum is black and there is a small pale ventral spot, as well as a dorsal spot. The elytron has a small subbasal spot and a median spot.
