= Coccinella tibetina =

Scientific classification
- Kingdom: Animalia
- Phylum: Arthropoda
- Clade: Pancrustacea
- Class: Insecta
- Order: Coleoptera
- Suborder: Polyphaga
- Infraorder: Cucujiformia
- Family: Coccinellidae
- Genus: Coccinella
- Species: C. tibetina

Binomial name
- Coccinella tibetina Kapur, 1963

Species of beetle

Coccinella tibetina is a species of beetle of the family Coccinellidae. It is found in Tibet.

== Description ==
Adults reach a length of about 5.4–5.8 mm (0.21–0.23 in). The head is black with a two pale testaceous frontal spots. The pronotum is black with a pale testaceous spot at each anterior angle. The scutellum is black and the elytra are with a large, black, diamond-shaped marking and each elytron with three black maculae.
