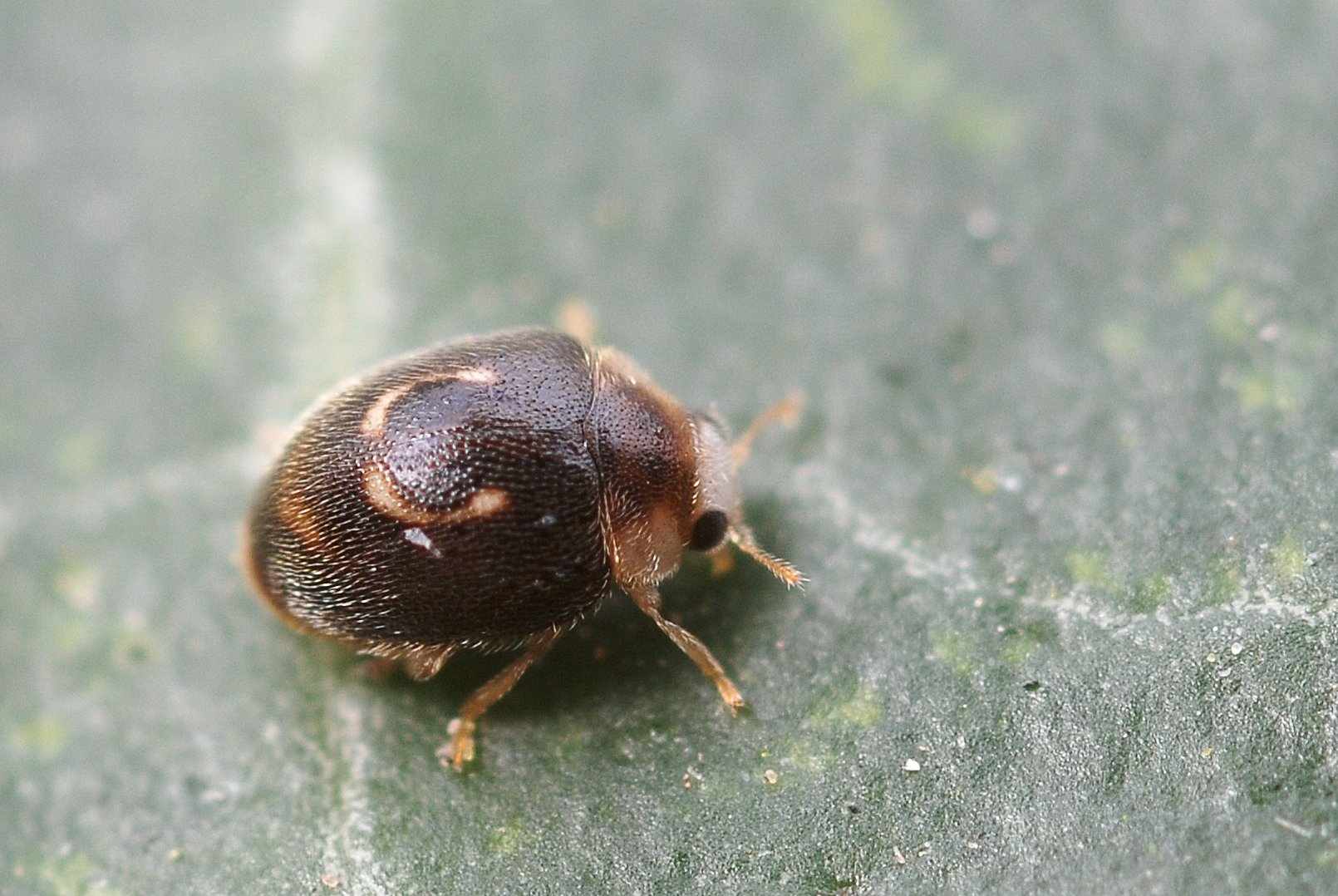
- Clitostethus arcuatus

Scientific classification
- Kingdom: Animalia
- Phylum: Arthropoda
- Clade: Pancrustacea
- Class: Insecta
- Order: Coleoptera
- Suborder: Polyphaga
- Infraorder: Cucujiformia
- Family: Coccinellidae
- Tribe: Coccidulini
- Genus: Clitostethus; Weise, 1885

= Clitostethus =

Genus of beetles

Clitostethus is a genus of dusky lady beetles in the family Coccinellidae.

== Species ==
- Clitostethus acutisiphonicus Peng, Ren & Pang 1998
- Clitostethus arcuatus (Rossi, 1794)
- Clitostethus bawanglingensis Peng, Ren & Pang 1998
- Clitostethus brachylobus Peng, Ren & Pang 1998
- Clitostethus flavotestaceus Mader, 1955
- Clitostethus lividipes Sicard, 1913
- Clitostethus neuenschwanderi Fürsch, 1987
- Clitostethus nigrifrons Yu, 1997
- Clitostethus sellatus Fürsch, 1995
- Clitostethus sternalis (Pang & Gordon, 1986)
- Clitostethus wenbishanus Yu in Yu, Montgomery & Yao, 2000

== Formerly placed here ==
- Clitostethus bicolor (Gordon, 1982)
- Clitostethus cocois (Gordon, 1972)
- Clitostethus convexus (Nunenmacher, 1937)
- Clitostethus dispar Sicard, 1929
- Clitostethus gorhami (Casey, 1899)
- Clitostethus indus (Gordon, 1996)
