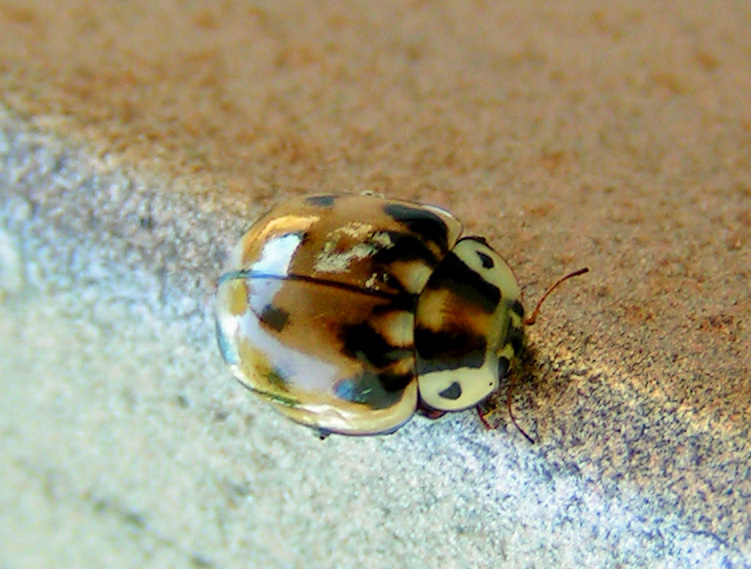

Scientific classification
- Kingdom: Animalia
- Phylum: Arthropoda
- Clade: Pancrustacea
- Class: Insecta
- Order: Coleoptera
- Suborder: Polyphaga
- Infraorder: Cucujiformia
- Family: Coccinellidae
- Genus: Myzia
- Species: M. pullata

Binomial name
- Myzia pullata (Say, 1826)

Synonyms
- Coccinella pullata Say, 1827; Coccinella notans Randall, 1838; Neomysia randalli Casey, 1899; Neomysia montana Casey, 1899

= Myzia pullata =

Species of beetle

Myzia pullata, the streaked lady beetle, is a species of lady beetle in the family Coccinellidae. It is found in North America, where it has been recorded from Labrador to South Carolina, west to Alberta and Colorado.

== Description ==
Adults reach a length of about 6.5-8 mm. Adults are pale brownish yellow. The pronotum is dark brown medially, and there is a white lateral border, as well as a dark brown median spot.
