= Coccinella amabilis =

Coccinella amabilis Temporal range: Sarmatian, 12.8–11.63 Ma

Scientific classification
- Kingdom: Animalia
- Phylum: Arthropoda
- Clade: Pancrustacea
- Class: Insecta
- Order: Coleoptera
- Suborder: Polyphaga
- Infraorder: Cucujiformia
- Family: Coccinellidae
- Genus: Coccinella
- Species: †C. amabilis

Binomial name
- †Coccinella amabilis Heer, 1864

Extinct species of ladybug

Coccinella amabilis is an extinct species of ladybug, family Coccinellidae. It was discovered in Oeningen, in Sarmatian age limestone of the Molasse basin in Germany.
