= Coccinella longifasciata =

Scientific classification
- Kingdom: Animalia
- Phylum: Arthropoda
- Clade: Pancrustacea
- Class: Insecta
- Order: Coleoptera
- Suborder: Polyphaga
- Infraorder: Cucujiformia
- Family: Coccinellidae
- Genus: Coccinella
- Species: C. longifasciata

Binomial name
- Coccinella longifasciata Liu, 1962

Synonyms
- Micraspis trilineata Weise, 1889 (preocc.); Coccinella nigrovittata Kapur, 1963

Species of beetle

Coccinella longifasciata is a species of beetle of the family Coccinellidae. It is found in Tibet.

== Description ==
Adults reach a length of about 3.2–5 mm (0.13–0.20 in). The head is black with a two pale testaceous or whitish spots. The pronotum is black with the anterior and lateral margins paler and yellowish and the scutellum is black. The elytra are yellowish-testaceous, with an elongate oval spot and each elytron with a black discal vitta.
