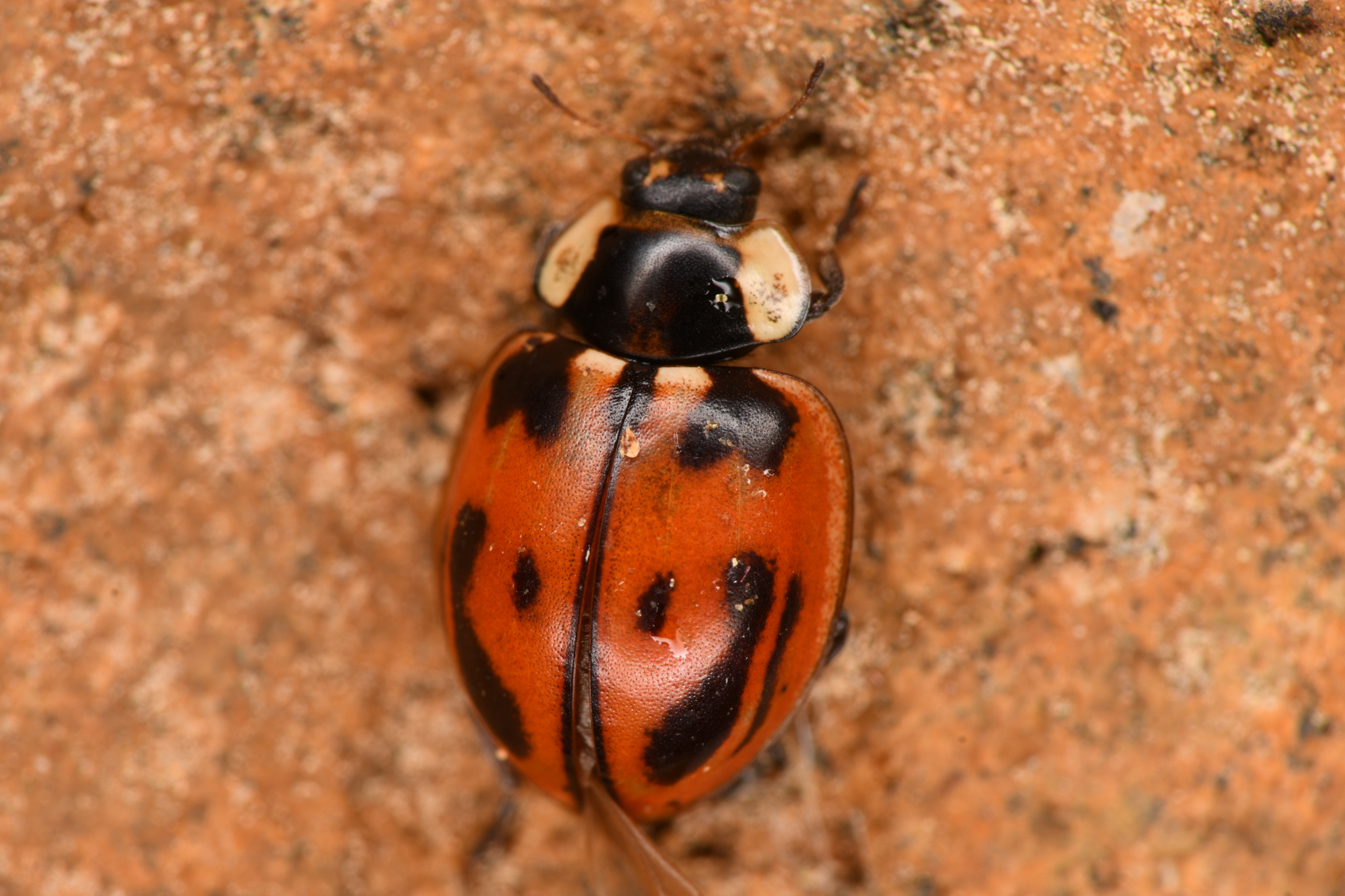

Scientific classification
- Kingdom: Animalia
- Phylum: Arthropoda
- Clade: Pancrustacea
- Class: Insecta
- Order: Coleoptera
- Suborder: Polyphaga
- Infraorder: Cucujiformia
- Family: Coccinellidae
- Genus: Myzia
- Species: M. subvittata

Binomial name
- Myzia subvittata (Mulsant, 1850)

Synonyms
- Mysia subvittata Mulsant, 1850; Mysia hornii Crotch, 1873; Neomysia oregona Casey, 1924

= Myzia subvittata =

Species of beetle

Myzia subvittata, the subvittate lady beetle, is a species of lady beetle in the family Coccinellidae. It is found in North America, where it has been recorded from British Columbia and Idaho south to southern California.

== Description ==
Adults reach a length of about 5.7-8 mm. Adults are yellowish brown. The pronotum is dark brown with a yellowish white lateral border and the elytron has dark brown vittae.
