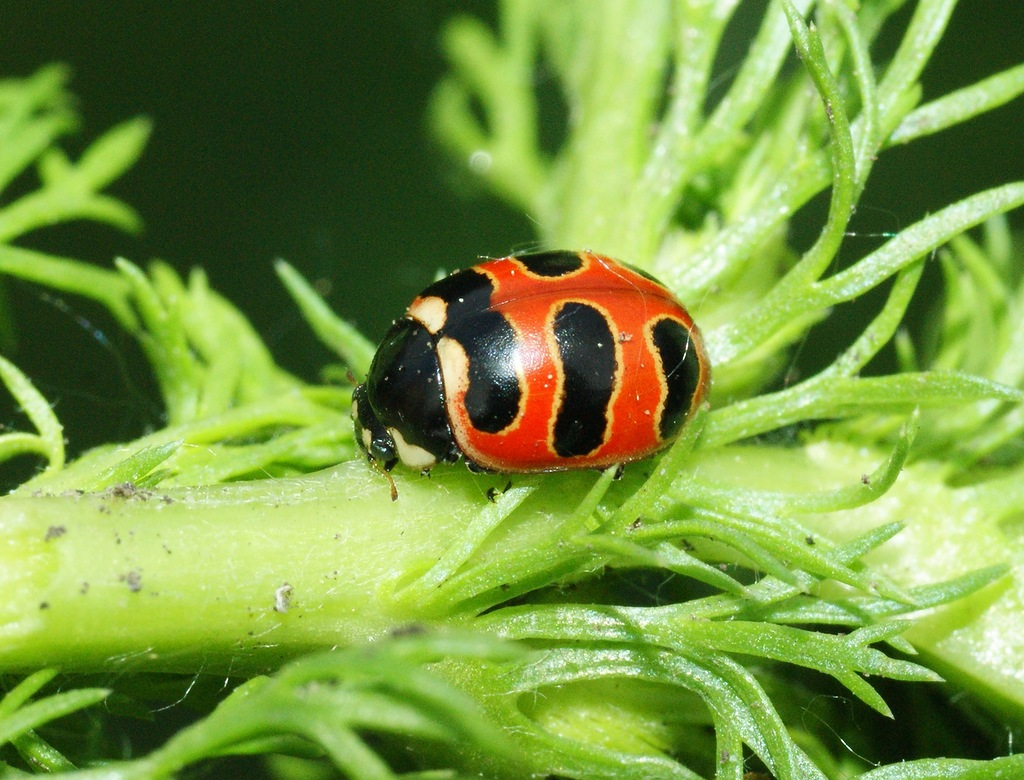

Scientific classification
- Kingdom: Animalia
- Phylum: Arthropoda
- Clade: Pancrustacea
- Class: Insecta
- Order: Coleoptera
- Suborder: Polyphaga
- Infraorder: Cucujiformia
- Family: Coccinellidae
- Genus: Coccinella
- Species: C. trifasciata

Binomial name
- Coccinella trifasciata (Linnaeus, 1758)

Synonyms
- Coccinella (Coccinella) trifasciata Linnaeus, 1758; Coccinella cimicifugae Pallas, 1773; Coccinella trifasciata var. fennica Weise, 1879; Coccinella subversa LeConte, 1854; Coccinella juliana Mulsant, 1856; Coccinella barda LeConte, 1859; Coccinella eugenii Mulsant, 1866; Coccinella perplexa Mulsant, 1850

= Coccinella trifasciata =

Species of beetle

Coccinella trifasciata, the three-banded lady beetle, is a species of lady beetle in the family Coccinellidae. It has a broad distribution, including Europe, Northern Asia (excluding China), Oceania, Southern Asia and North America.

== Subspecies ==
These three subspecies belong to the species Coccinella trifasciata:

- Coccinella trifasciata trifasciata
- Coccinella trifasciata perplexa Mulsant, 1850 (Labrador to New Jersey, west to Alaska and California)
- Coccinella trifasciata subversa LeConte, 1854 (British Columbia to California)
