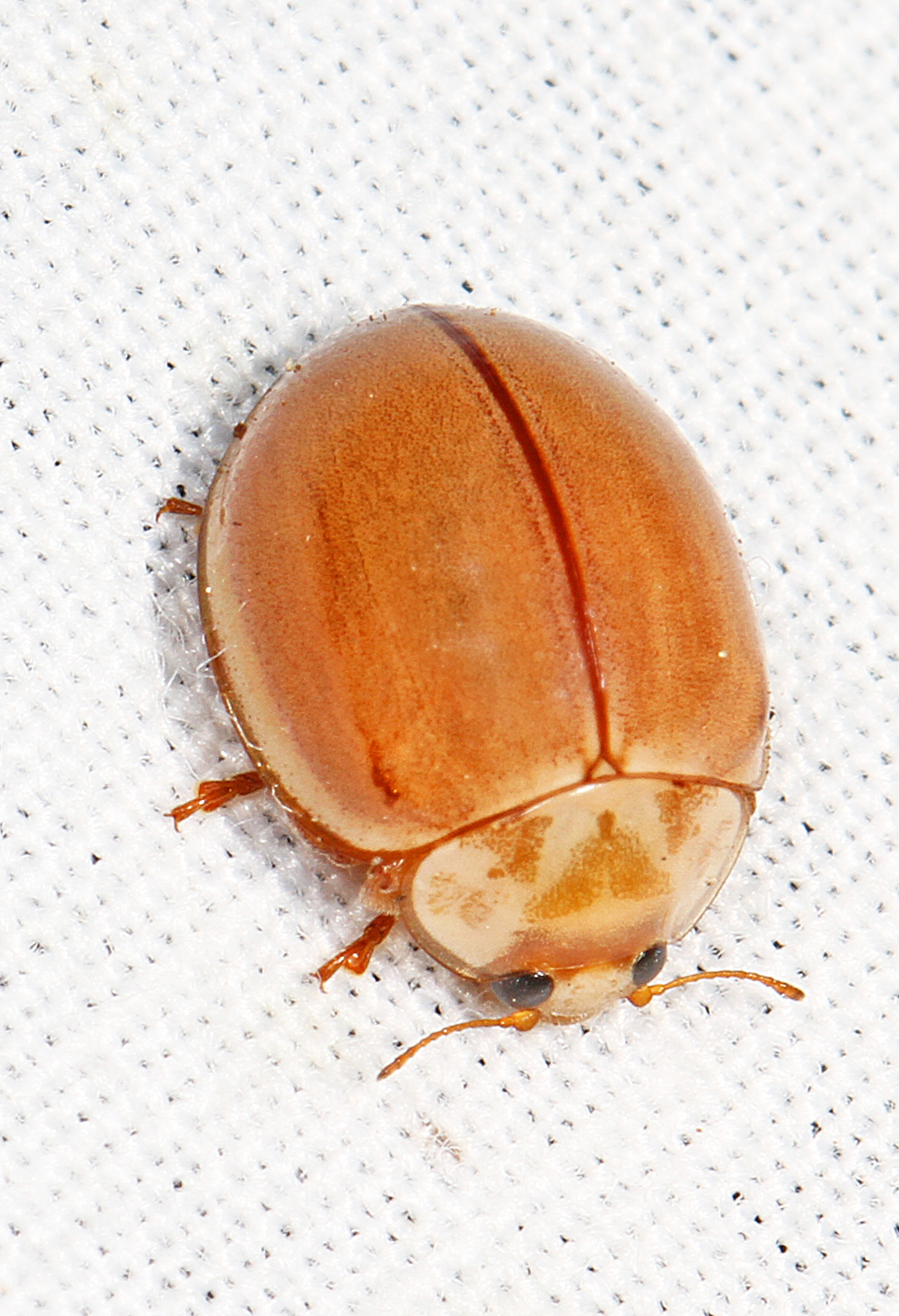
- Myzia interrupta

Scientific classification
- Kingdom: Animalia
- Phylum: Arthropoda
- Clade: Pancrustacea
- Class: Insecta
- Order: Coleoptera
- Suborder: Polyphaga
- Infraorder: Cucujiformia
- Family: Coccinellidae
- Tribe: Coccinellini
- Genus: Myzia; Mulsant, 1846

Synonyms
- Neomysia Casey, 1899; Paramysia Reitter, 1911

= Myzia =

Genus of beetles

Myzia is a genus of lady beetles in the family Coccinellidae. There are at least 8 described species in Myzia.

== Species ==
- Myzia bissexnotata (Jing, 1992)
- Myzia gebleri (Crotch, 1874)
- Myzia gerstaeckeri (Mulsant, 1866)
- Myzia interrupta (Casey, 1899) (broken-dashed lady beetle)
- Myzia oblongoguttata (Linnaeus, 1758)
- Myzia pullata (Say, 1826) (streaked lady beetle)
- Myzia sexvittata (Kitano, 2008)
- Myzia subvittata (Mulsant, 1850) (subvittate lady beetle)
