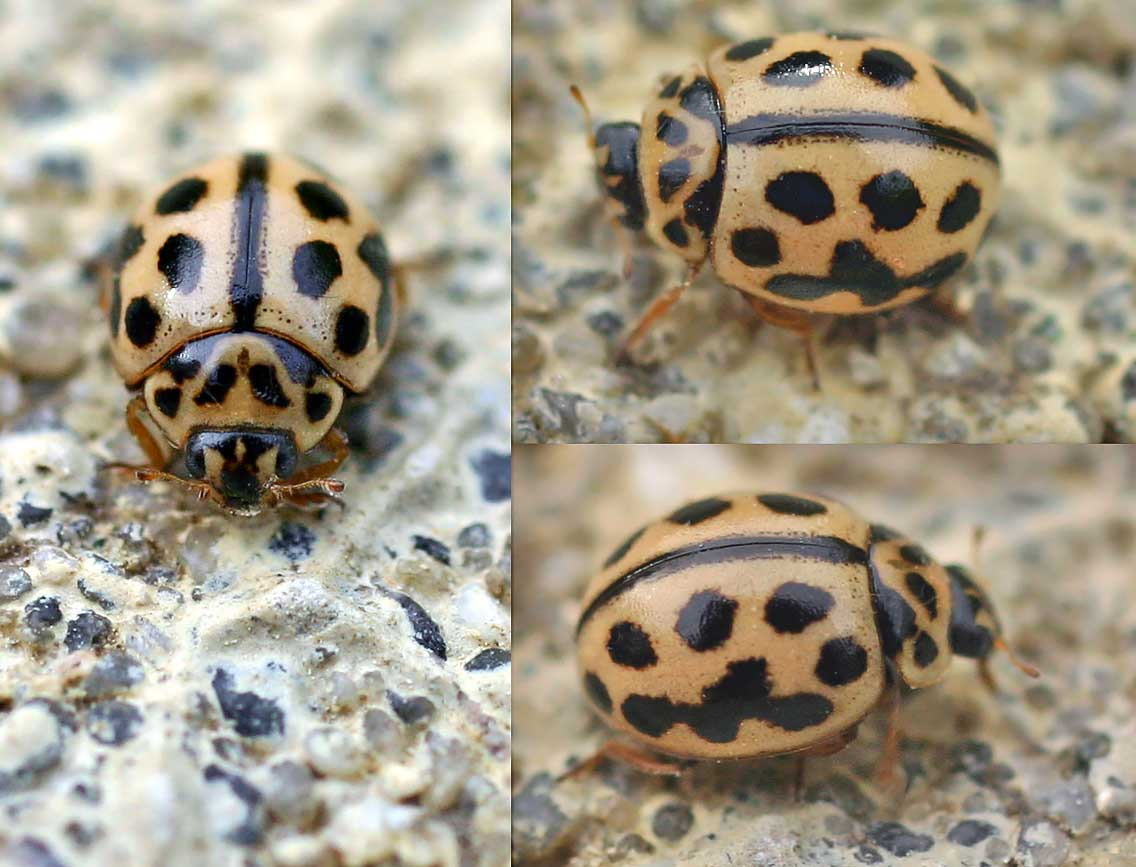
- Tytthaspis sedecimpunctata

Scientific classification
- Kingdom: Animalia
- Phylum: Arthropoda
- Clade: Pancrustacea
- Class: Insecta
- Order: Coleoptera
- Suborder: Polyphaga
- Infraorder: Cucujiformia
- Family: Coccinellidae
- Subfamily: Coccinellinae
- Genus: Tytthaspis; Crotch, 1874

= Tytthaspis =

Genus of beetles

Tytthaspis are a genus of ladybird beetles. They have comb-like structures on their mandibles with which they gather fungal spores. The genus contains two subgenera (Barovskia and Tytthaspis) and the following species:

- Tytthaspis gebleri (=Tytthaspis lineola)
- Tytthaspis phalerata
- Tytthaspis sedecimguttata
- Tytthaspis sedecimpunctata (=Tytthaspis 16-punctata)
- Tytthaspis 19-guttata
- Tytthaspis trilineata (see Coccinella nigrovittata)
- Tytthaspis univittata (see Pseudoverania univittata)
