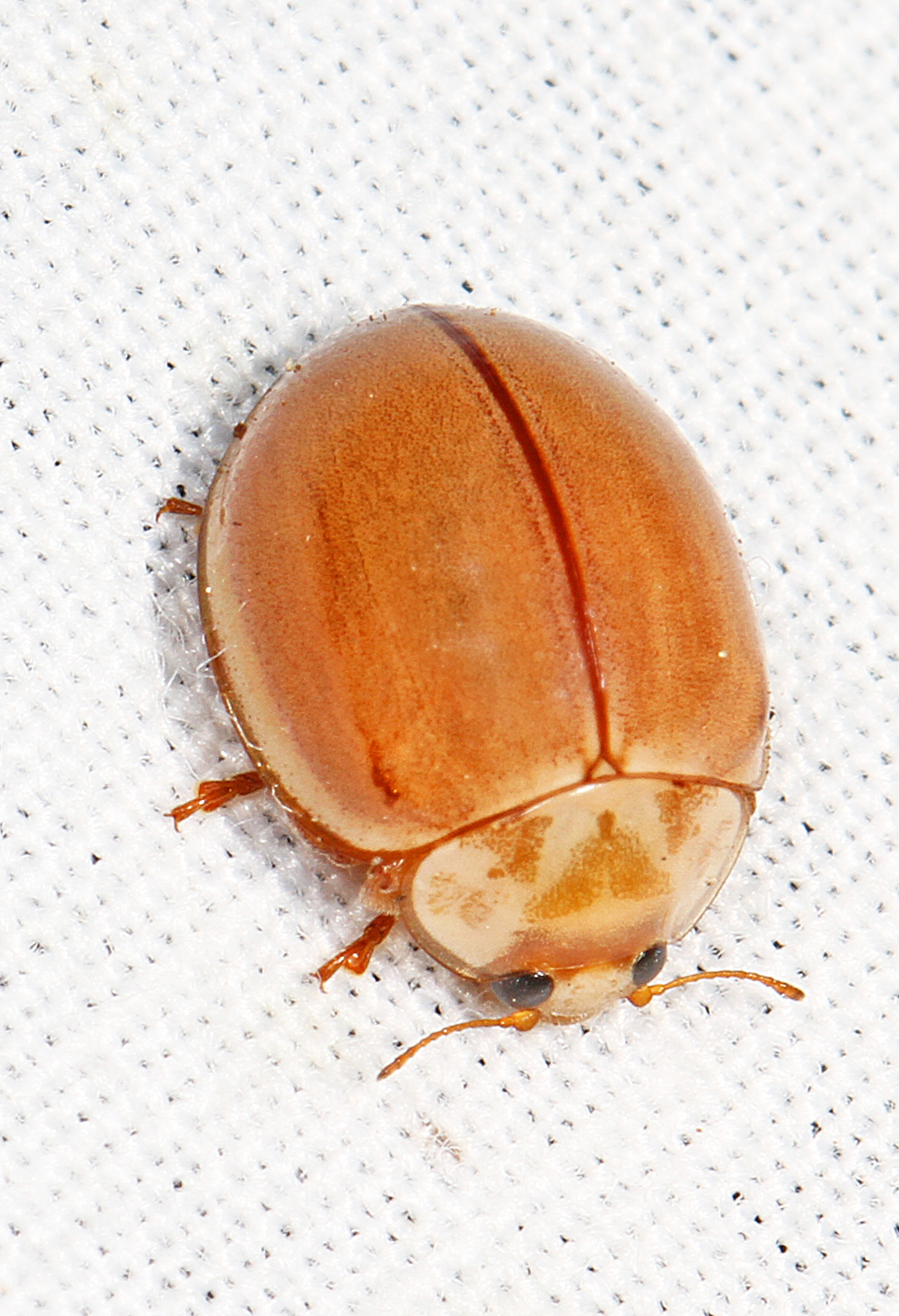
- Female in Nevada.

Scientific classification
- Kingdom: Animalia
- Phylum: Arthropoda
- Clade: Pancrustacea
- Class: Insecta
- Order: Coleoptera
- Suborder: Polyphaga
- Infraorder: Cucujiformia
- Family: Coccinellidae
- Genus: Myzia
- Species: M. interrupta

Binomial name
- Myzia interrupta (Casey, 1899)

Synonyms
- Neomysia interrupta Casey, 1899; Neomysia oblongoguttata caseyi Timberlake, 1943

= Myzia interrupta =

Species of beetle

Myzia interrupta, the broken-dashed ladybeetle, is a species of lady beetle in the family Coccinellidae. It is found in North America, where it has been recorded from Alberta to western Texas, west to British Columbia and California.

== Description ==
Adults reach a length of about 6.5-8 mm. Adults are pale yellowish brown, the pronotum with three light brown spots and the elytron usually with light brown vittae.
