= Coccinella lama =

Scientific classification
- Kingdom: Animalia
- Phylum: Arthropoda
- Clade: Pancrustacea
- Class: Insecta
- Order: Coleoptera
- Suborder: Polyphaga
- Infraorder: Cucujiformia
- Family: Coccinellidae
- Genus: Coccinella
- Species: C. lama

Binomial name
- Coccinella lama Kapur, 1963

Species of beetle

Coccinella lama is a species of beetle of the family Coccinellidae. It is found in Tibet.

== Description ==
Adults reach a length of about 4.5 mm (0.18 in). The head is black with a two white spots and the pronotum is black with a white area with a wavy margin. The scutellum is black and the elytra are reddish testaceous with a heart-shaped black macula with a whitish basal mark. Each elytron also has four black spots.
