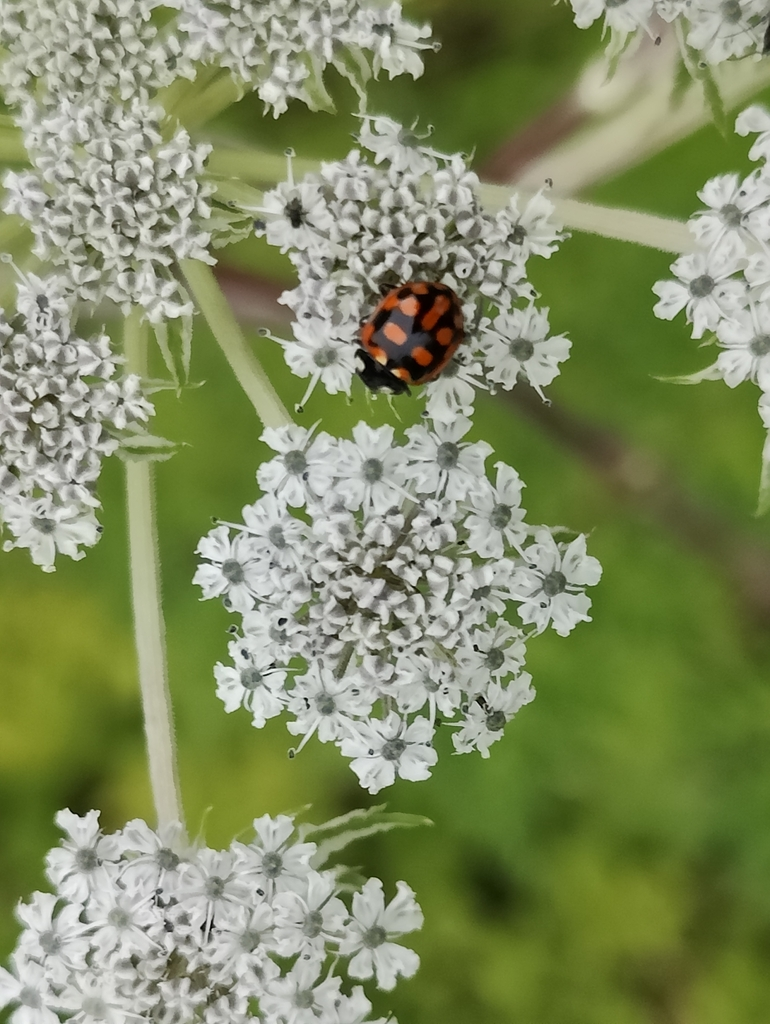

Scientific classification
- Kingdom: Animalia
- Phylum: Arthropoda
- Clade: Pancrustacea
- Class: Insecta
- Order: Coleoptera
- Suborder: Polyphaga
- Infraorder: Cucujiformia
- Family: Coccinellidae
- Genus: Coccinella
- Species: C. luteopicta

Binomial name
- Coccinella luteopicta (Mulsant, 1866)

Synonyms
- Adalia luteopicta Mulsant, 1866

= Coccinella luteopicta =

Species of beetle

Coccinella luteopicta is a species of beetle of the family Coccinellidae. It is found in India (Arunachal Pradesh, Himachal Pradesh, Jammu & Kashmir, Sikkim, Uttar Pradesh, Uttarkhand, West Bengal), Bhutan, Nepal, Tibet and China.

== Description ==
Adults reach a length of about 4.75–5.35 mm (0.187–0.211 in). The head is black with two pale yellow frontal spots. The pronotum is black with yellow anterolateral corners and the elytra are bright red with a black pattern.

== Life history ==
They have been recorded preying on various Aphidoidea species.
