= Clitostethus sternalis =

Scientific classification
- Kingdom: Animalia
- Phylum: Arthropoda
- Clade: Pancrustacea
- Class: Insecta
- Order: Coleoptera
- Suborder: Polyphaga
- Infraorder: Cucujiformia
- Family: Coccinellidae
- Genus: Clitostethus
- Species: C. sternalis

Binomial name
- Clitostethus sternalis (Pang & Gordon, 1986)

Synonyms
- Pseudoscymnus sternalis Pang & Gordon, 1986

Species of beetle

Clitostethus sternalis is a species of beetle of the family Coccinellidae. It is found in China (Guangdong).

== Description ==
Adults reach a length of about 1.5 mm. Adults have a yellow head and pronotum and the elytron is black with a yellowish apex.
