= Coccinella fossilis =

Scientific classification
- Kingdom: Animalia
- Phylum: Arthropoda
- Clade: Pancrustacea
- Class: Insecta
- Order: Coleoptera
- Suborder: Polyphaga
- Infraorder: Cucujiformia
- Family: Coccinellidae
- Genus: Coccinella
- Species: †C. fossilis

Binomial name
- †Coccinella fossilis von Heyden, 1866

Extinct species of ladybug

Coccinella fossilis is an extinct species of ladybug that lived from 28.4-23 million years ago in the Oligocene epoch of Germany.
