= Coccinella prolongata =

Scientific classification
- Kingdom: Animalia
- Phylum: Arthropoda
- Clade: Pancrustacea
- Class: Insecta
- Order: Coleoptera
- Suborder: Polyphaga
- Infraorder: Cucujiformia
- Family: Coccinellidae
- Genus: Coccinella
- Species: C. prolongata

Binomial name
- Coccinella prolongata Crotch, 1873

Synonyms
- Coccinella bridwelli Nunenmacher, 1913

Species of beetle

Coccinella prolongata, the prolongate lady beetle, is a species of lady beetle in the family Coccinellidae. It is found in North America, where it has been recorded from British Columbia, California, Colorado, Idaho, Montana, Nebraska, Nevada, Oregon, Washington and Wyoming.

== Description ==
Adults reach a length of about 5.7-7 mm and have a black head with two pale spots. The pronotum has a large anterolateral pale spot, as well as a ventral and dorsal spot. The elytron has two black spots and a scutellar spot.

== Subspecies ==
These three subspecies belong to the species Coccinella prolongata:

- Coccinella prolongata prolongata (British Columbia, California, Colorado, Idaho, Montana, Nebraska, Nevada, Oregon, Washington, Wyoming)
- Coccinella prolongata bridwelli Nunenmacher, 1913 (California)
- Coccinella prolongata sequoiae Dobzhansky, 1931 (California, Nevada)
