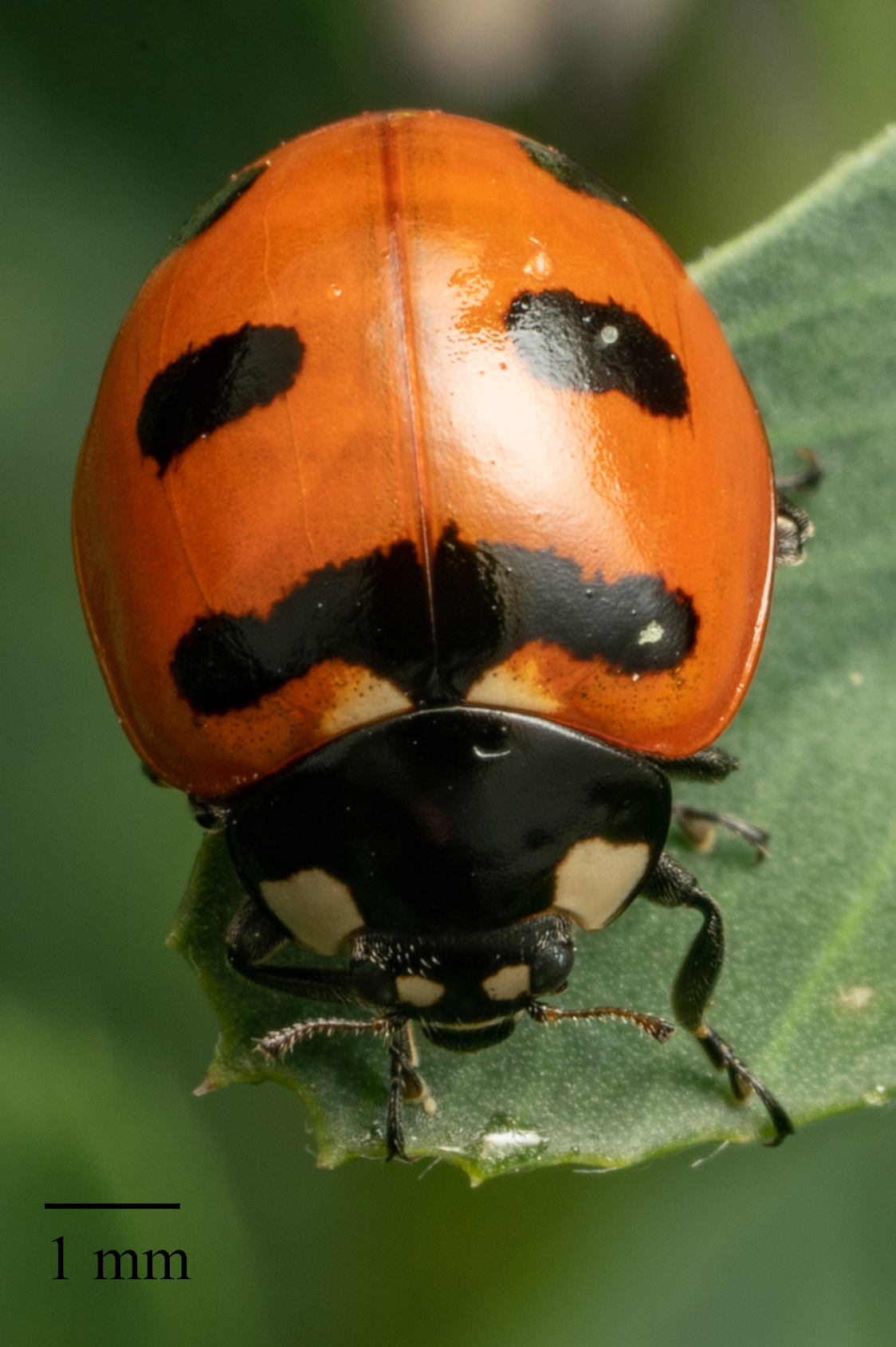
- Near Lyman, Utah

Scientific classification
- Kingdom: Animalia
- Phylum: Arthropoda
- Clade: Pancrustacea
- Class: Insecta
- Order: Coleoptera
- Suborder: Polyphaga
- Infraorder: Cucujiformia
- Family: Coccinellidae
- Genus: Coccinella
- Species: C. transversoguttata

Binomial name
- Coccinella transversoguttata Faldermann, 1835

Synonyms
- Coccinella ephippiata Zetterstedt, 1838; Coccinella trifasciata O. Fabricius, 1780 (preocc.); Coccinella quinquenotata Kirby, 1837 (preocc.); Coccinella transversalis Mulsant, 1850 (preocc.); Coccinella nugatoria Mulsant, 1850; Coccinella novemstigma Mulsant, 1850; Coccinella geminopunctata Liu, 1962

= Coccinella transversoguttata =

Species of beetle

Coccinella transversoguttata, the transverse ladybird, is a species of ladybird beetle occurring across Europe and North America. It is not to be confused with another species by the same common name, Coccinella transversalis, a widespread species across Australia and Asia.

== Description ==
Adults reach a length of about 5.7–7.3 mm (0.22–0.29 in). The head is black with two large white-yellow spots. The scutellum is black and the elytra are orange-red with 11 black spots.

== Subspecies ==
- Coccinella transversoguttata transversoguttata
- Coccinella transversoguttata ephippiata Zetterstedt, 1838 (Greenland)
- Coccinella transversoguttata richardsoni Brown, 1962 (Labrador to Virginia, west to Alaska and California)
