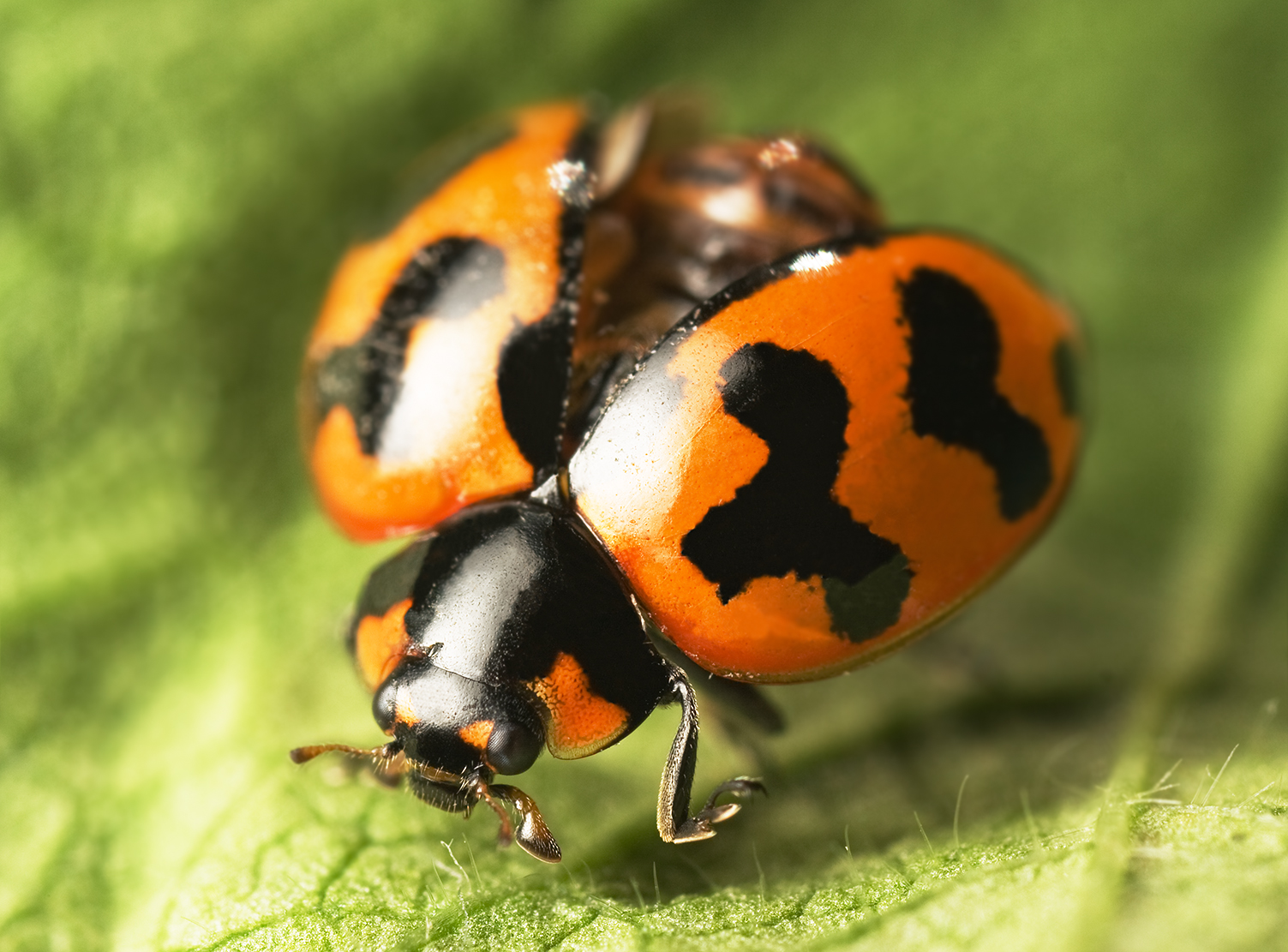
- Coccinella transversalis

Scientific classification
- Kingdom: Animalia
- Phylum: Arthropoda
- Clade: Pancrustacea
- Class: Insecta
- Order: Coleoptera
- Suborder: Polyphaga
- Infraorder: Cucujiformia
- Family: Coccinellidae
- Subfamily: Coccinellinae
- Genus: Coccinella; Linnaeus, 1758

Type species
- Coccinella septempunctata Linnaeus, 1758

Synonyms
- Spilota Billberg, 1820; Harmoniella Casey, 1908; Miliziella Filippov, 1961

= Coccinella =

Genus of beetles

Coccinella is the most familiar genus of ladybird (or, in North America, ladybug). The elytra of most species are of a red or orange colour, punctuated with black spots or bands. The genus occurs throughout the Northern Hemisphere, but has only 11 species native to North America, with far more in Eurasia.

Its name comes from Latin coccineus, referring to the color scarlet.

Adults and larvae are voracious predators of aphids, and some species (e.g. C. septempunctata) are used as biological control agents.

== Taxonomy ==
According to the Global Biodiversity Information Facility, 94 individual species of Coccinella are listed in the genus.

- Coccinella adalioides
- Coccinella ainu
- Coccinella alpigrada
- Coccinella alta
- †Coccinella amabilis
- †Coccinella andromeda
- †Coccinella antiqua
- Coccinella barovskii
- †Coccinella bituminosa
- Coccinella boletifera
- Coccinella californica
- †Coccinella colorata
- Coccinella compta
- Coccinella concinna
- Coccinella coriacea
- Coccinella difficilis
- Coccinella explanata
- †Coccinella fossilis
- Coccinella fulgida
- Coccinella genistae
- Coccinella gigantea
- †Coccinella haagi
- Coccinella hasegawai
- †Coccinella heeri
- †Coccinella hesione
- Coccinella hieroglyphica
- Coccinella hodeki
- Coccinella iranica
- Coccinella johnsoni
- †Coccinella krantzi
- Coccinella lama
- Coccinella leonina
- Coccinella leopoldi
- Coccinella longifasciata
- Coccinella luteipennis
- Coccinella luteopicta
- Coccinella magnifica
- Coccinella magnopunctata
- Coccinella marussii
- Coccinella miranda
- Coccinella monticola
- Coccinella nepalensis
- Coccinella nivicola
- Coccinella novemnotata
- †Coccinella perses
- †Coccinella ponomarenkoi
- †Coccinella prisca
- Coccinella prolongata
- Coccinella pteromelas
- Coccinella quichensis
- Coccinella quinquepunctata
- Coccinella reitteri
- Coccinella sachalinensis
- Coccinella saucerottii
- Coccinella sedakovii
- Coccinella sedecimpustulata
- Coccinella septempunctata
- †Coccinella sodoma
- Coccinella sonorica
- Coccinella tibetina
- Coccinella transversalis
- Coccinella transversoguttata
- Coccinella trifasciata
- Coccinella turkestanica
- Coccinella undecimpunctata
- Coccinella venusta
- Coccinella weisei
- Coccinella whitiangii
