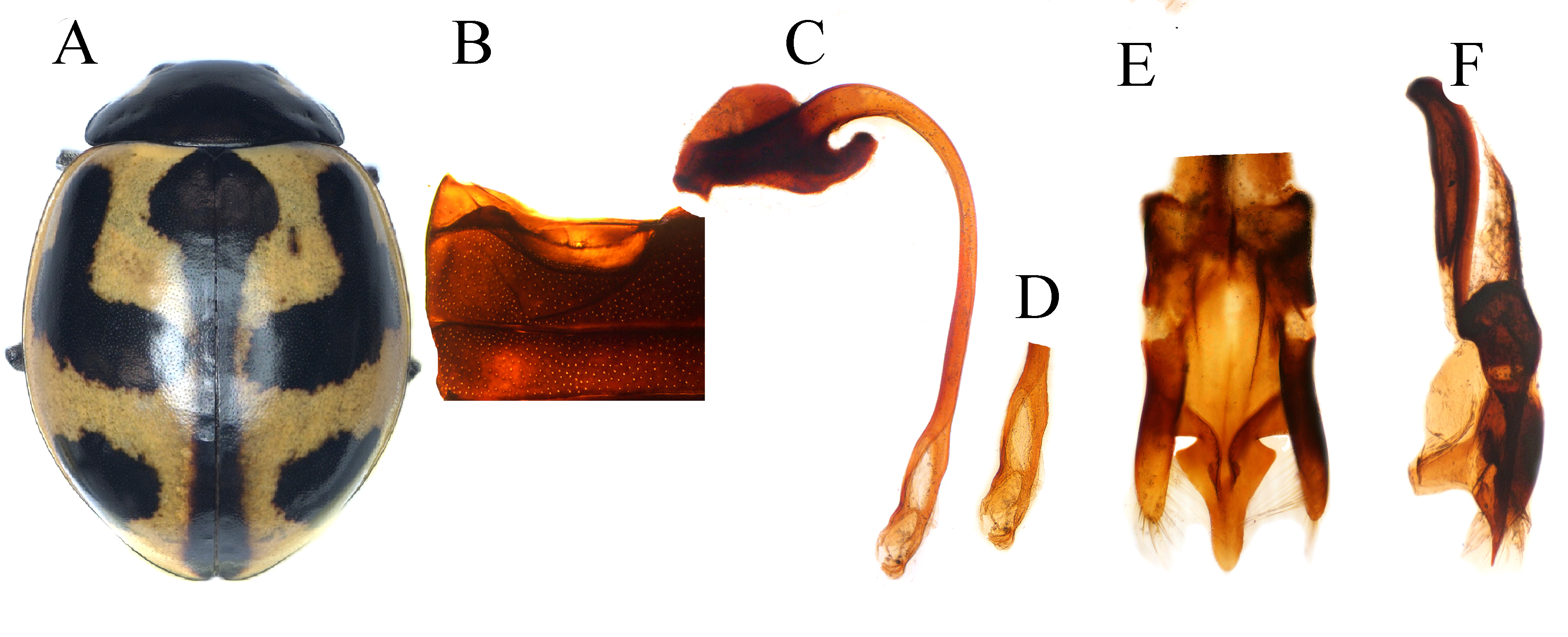

Scientific classification
- Kingdom: Animalia
- Phylum: Arthropoda
- Clade: Pancrustacea
- Class: Insecta
- Order: Coleoptera
- Suborder: Polyphaga
- Infraorder: Cucujiformia
- Family: Coccinellidae
- Genus: Coccinella
- Species: C. marussii

Binomial name
- Coccinella marussii Kapur, 1973

= Coccinella marussii =

Species of beetle

Coccinella marussii is a species of beetle of the family Coccinellidae. It is found in north-western India (Kashmir), northern Pakistan and the Karakoram range.

== Description ==
They have a moderately convex body and are smaller in size but otherwise similar to Coccinella septempunctata.
