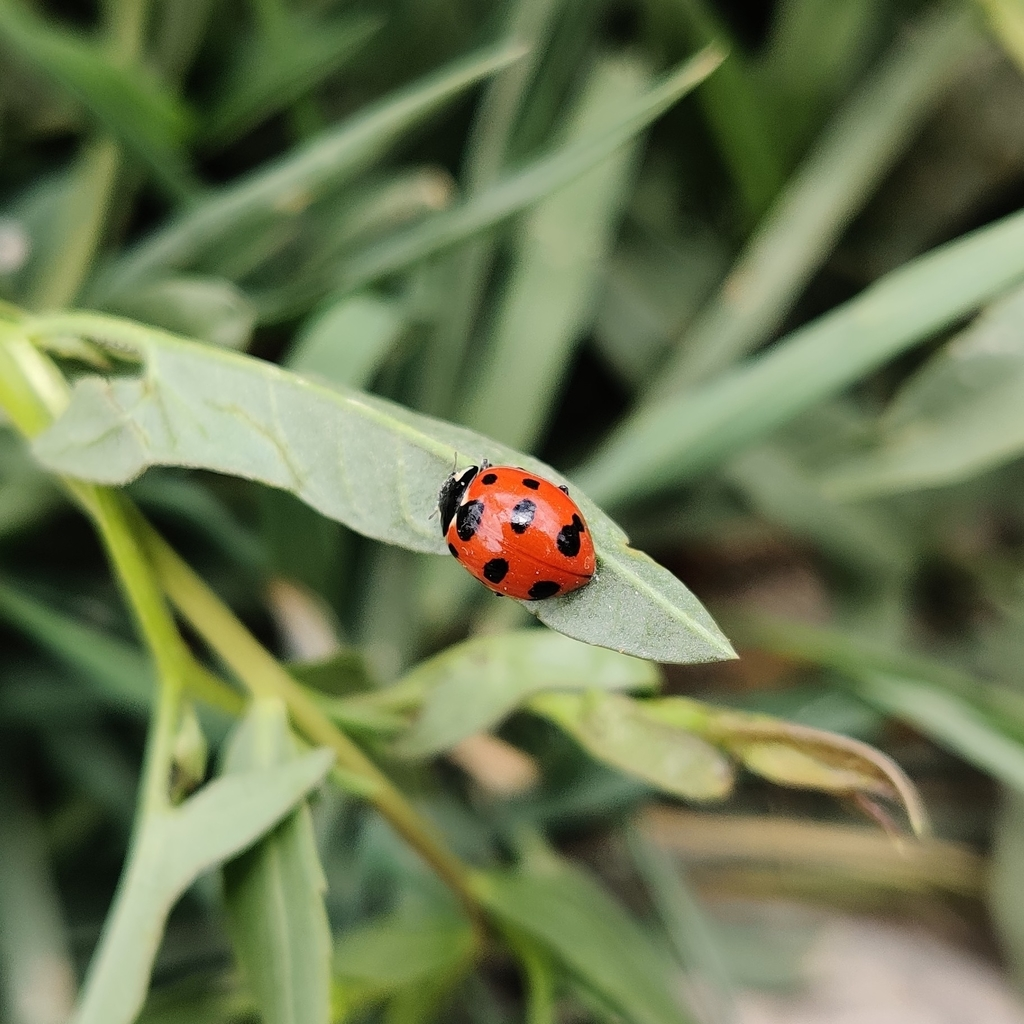

Scientific classification
- Kingdom: Animalia
- Phylum: Arthropoda
- Clade: Pancrustacea
- Class: Insecta
- Order: Coleoptera
- Suborder: Polyphaga
- Infraorder: Cucujiformia
- Family: Coccinellidae
- Genus: Coccinella
- Species: C. magnopunctata

Binomial name
- Coccinella magnopunctata (Rybakow, 1889)

Synonyms
- Coccinella undecimpunctata var. magnopunctata Rybakow, 1889; Coccinella semenowi Weise, 1889

= Coccinella magnopunctata =

Species of beetle

Coccinella magnopunctata is a species of beetle of the family Coccinellidae. It is found in India (Kashmir), Nepal, China, Tibet, Mongolia, Russia and Iran.

== Description ==
Adults reach a length of about 5.5–7 mm (0.22–0.28 in). The head is black with two large yellow-white frontal spots. The pronotum is black with small ochraceous-white spots. The scutellum is black and the elytra are orange-red with 11 black spots.
