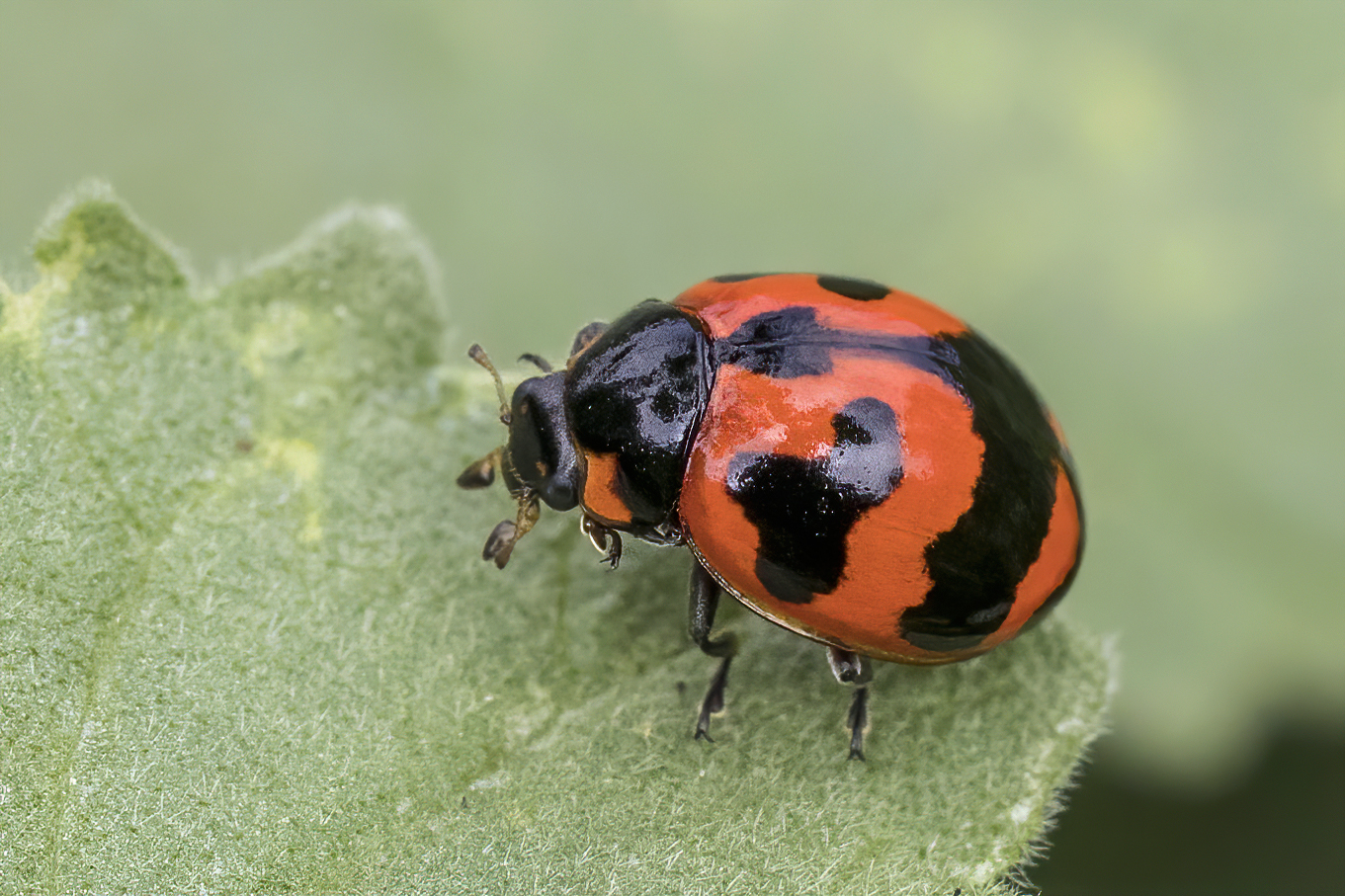
- In Chinnar Wildlife Sanctuary, Kerala
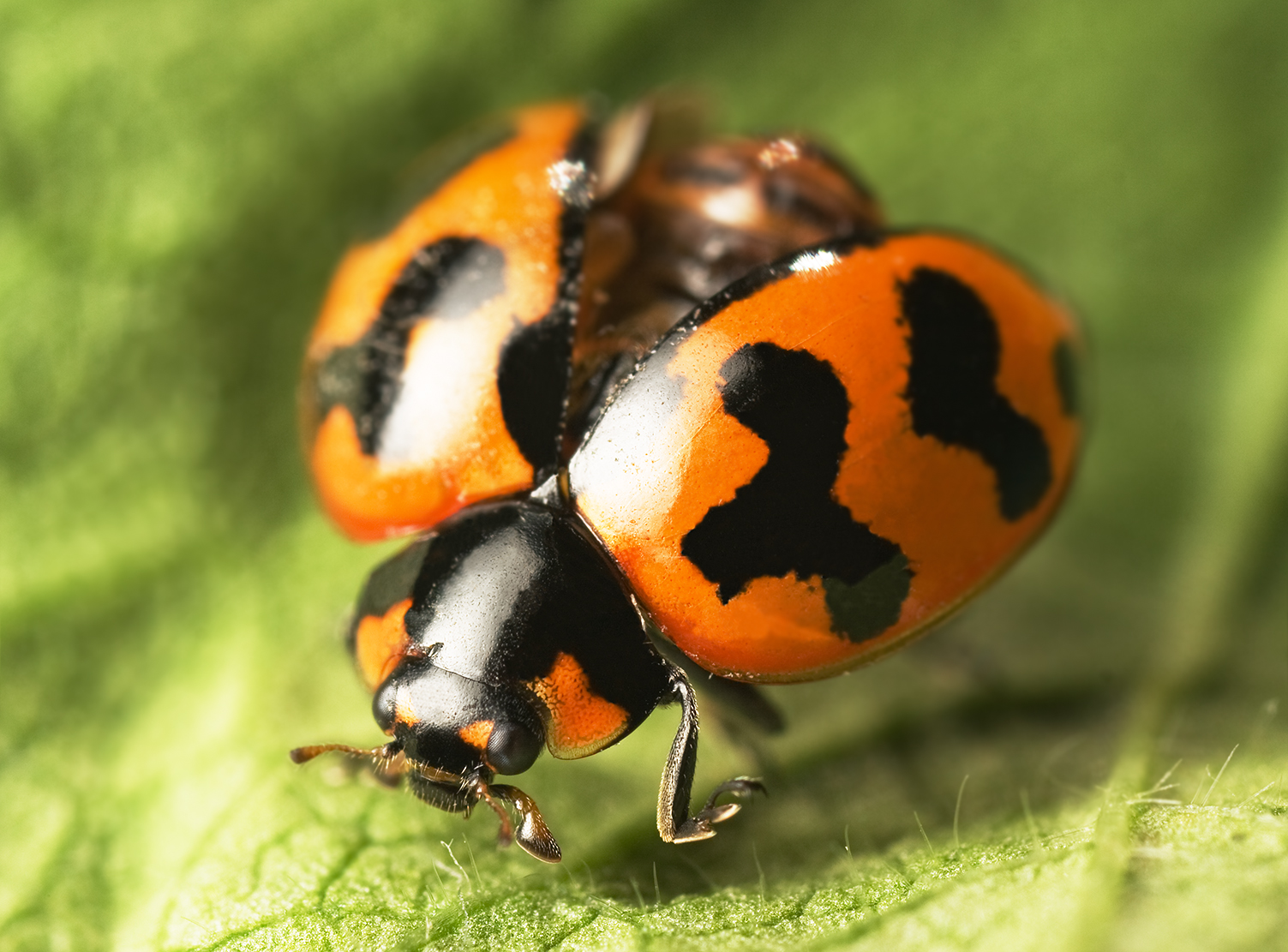
- Near Austins Ferry, Tasmania

Conservation status
- Least Concern (IUCN 3.1)

Scientific classification
- Kingdom: Animalia
- Phylum: Arthropoda
- Clade: Pancrustacea
- Class: Insecta
- Order: Coleoptera
- Suborder: Polyphaga
- Infraorder: Cucujiformia
- Family: Coccinellidae
- Genus: Coccinella
- Species: C. transversalis

Binomial name
- Coccinella transversalis Fabricius, 1781

Synonyms
- Coccinella repanda Thunberg, 1781; Coccinella contempta Boisduval, 1835

= Coccinella transversalis =

Species of beetle

Coccinella transversalis, commonly known as the transverse ladybird or transverse lady beetle, is a species of ladybird beetle found from India across southern and southeastern Asia to Malesia and Australia. It is not to be confused with Coccinella transversoguttata, a widespread species in Europe and North America also known as the transverse ladybird. The alternative vernacular of small transverse ladybird may be used for C. transversalis in instances where these two species are discussed together.

The transverse ladybird was first described by Danish zoologist Johan Christian Fabricius in 1781 as Coccinella transversalis and still bears its original name. Fabricius' description predated Carl Peter Thunberg's naming of this species as C. repanda by several months.

== Description ==
Measuring 3.8 to 6.7 millimetres (0.15 to 0.26 in) long and 3.3 to 5.45 millimetres (0.130 to 0.215 in) wide, the transverse ladybird shows little variation across its wide range. It has a black head with predominantly bright red or orange elytra boldly marked with a black band down the midline and two lateral three-lobed markings.

== Prey ==
Like many species of ladybirds, the transverse ladybird plays an important role in agriculture as it preys on a wide array of plant-eating insects which damage crops, particularly early in the growing season. Among those insects hunted include many species of aphids, including the pea aphid (Acyrthosiphon pisum), Aphis affinis, cowpea aphid (Aphis craccivora), cotton aphid (Aphis gossypii), milkweed aphid (Aphis nerii), spirea aphid (Aphis spiraecola), leafcurling plum aphid (Brachycaudus helichrysi), cabbage aphid (Brevicoryne brassicae), Cervaphis quercus, Cervaphis rappardi indica, turnip aphid (Lipaphis pseudobrassicae), Macrosiphoniella yomogifoliae, potato aphid (Macrosiphum euphorbiae), rose aphid (Macrosiphum rosae), Melanaphis donacis, Melanaphis sacchari, Myzus nicotianae, green peach aphid (Myzus persicae), Pentalonia nigronervosa, corn aphid (Rhopalosiphum maidis), Sitobion rosaeiformis, Taoia indica, Toxoptera aurantii, Therioaphis ononidis, Therioaphis trifolii, Uroleucon compositae and Uroleucon sonchi, species of leafhopper including Empoascanara indica and Idioscopus clypealis, the scale insect species Orthezia insignis, the Asian citrus psyllid (Diaphorina citri), the cotton bollworm (Helicoverpa armigera), and oriental leafworm moth (Spodoptera litura).
