= Coccinella ainu =

Scientific classification
- Kingdom: Animalia
- Phylum: Arthropoda
- Clade: Pancrustacea
- Class: Insecta
- Order: Coleoptera
- Suborder: Polyphaga
- Infraorder: Cucujiformia
- Family: Coccinellidae
- Genus: Coccinella
- Species: C. ainu

Binomial name
- Coccinella ainu Lewis, 1896

Species of ladybug

Coccinella ainu is a species of ladybug native to Asia in areas such as Russia, China and Japan.
