= Coccinella alta =

Scientific classification
- Kingdom: Animalia
- Phylum: Arthropoda
- Clade: Pancrustacea
- Class: Insecta
- Order: Coleoptera
- Suborder: Polyphaga
- Infraorder: Cucujiformia
- Family: Coccinellidae
- Genus: Coccinella
- Species: C. alta

Binomial name
- Coccinella alta Brown, 1962

Synonyms
- Coccinella suturalis Casey, 1899 (preocc.)

Species of beetle

Coccinella alta is a species of beetle of the family Coccinellidae. It is found in North America, where it has been recorded from Alberta, Utah, Colorado and California.

Adults reach a length of about 4.80–5.30 mm. Adults have a black head with pale spots. The anterior margin of the pronotum is black and there is a small pale ventral spot, as well as a dorsal spot. The elytron has a blackish sutural margin and two black spots.
