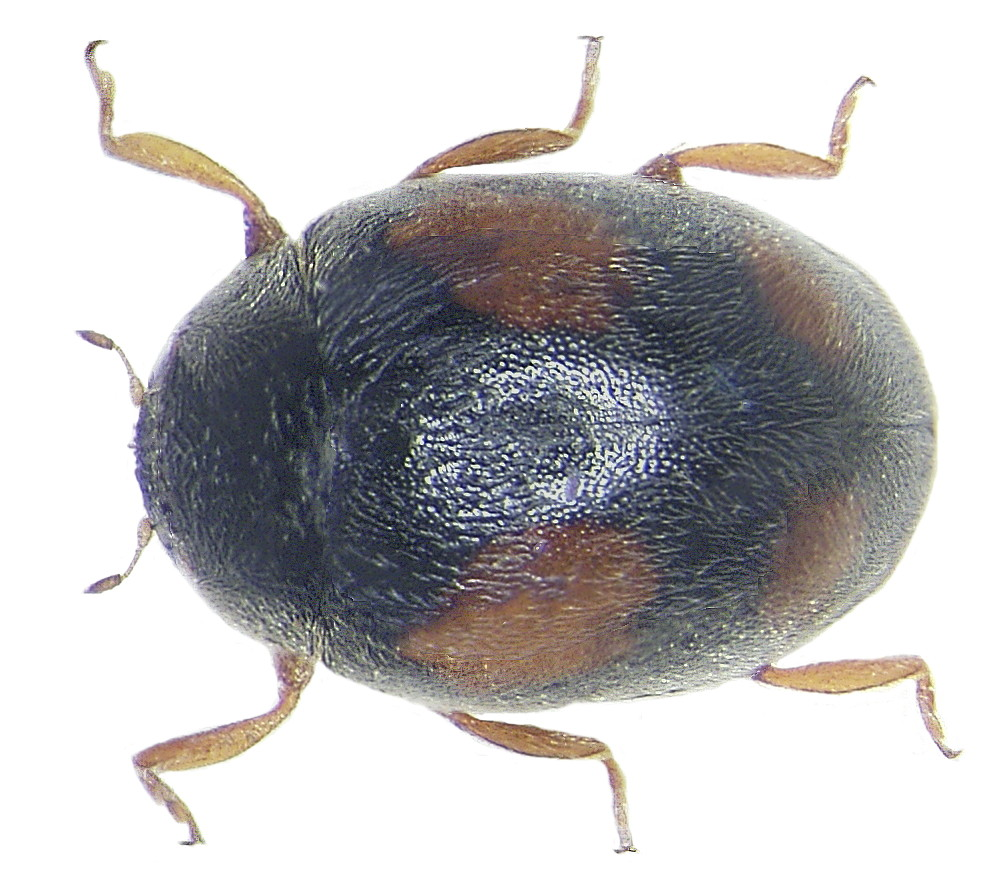

Scientific classification
- Kingdom: Animalia
- Phylum: Arthropoda
- Clade: Pancrustacea
- Class: Insecta
- Order: Coleoptera
- Suborder: Polyphaga
- Infraorder: Cucujiformia
- Family: Coccinellidae
- Genus: Scymnus
- Species: S. frontalis

Binomial name
- Scymnus frontalis (Fabricius, 1787)

Synonyms
- Coccinella frontalis Fabricius, 1787; Chrysomela altica Schrank, 1781; Scymnus bipustulatus Panzer, 1794; Coccinella humeralis Panzer, 1795 (preocc.); Scymnus bimaculatus Thunberg, 1795; Scymnus didymus Herbst, 1797; Coccinella flavilabris Paykull, 1798; Coccinella oblongopustulata Müller in Germar, 1818; Scymnus affinis Redtenbacher, 1843; Scymnus bisbisignatus Redtenbacher, 1843; Scymnus (Scymnus) quadrivulneratus Mulsant, 1850; Scymnus (Scymnus) flavellus Savoyskaya, 1969

= Scymnus frontalis =

Species of beetle

Scymnus frontalis, the angle-spotted ladybird, is a species of beetle in the family Coccinellidae. It is found in from Europe (including southern Britain) east to China (Fujian, Hebei, Shandong, Xinjian).

== Description ==
Adults reach a length of about 2.7-2.9 mm. Males have a red head and a anterolateral yellowish red spot and yellowish red anterior margin. Females have a black head and pronotum. The elytron of both sexes is black with two yellowish red spots.

== Biology ==
They feed on aphids and live in low growing vegetation. They are typically 2.6 to 3.2 mm in length.
