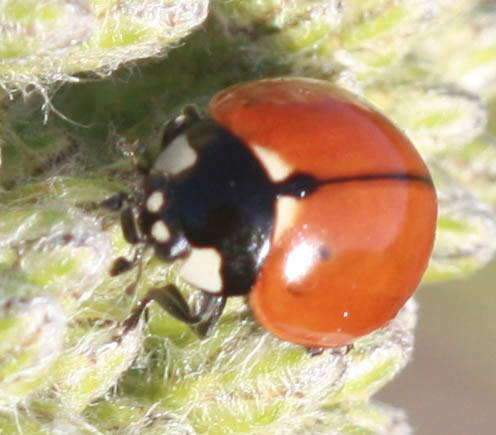

Scientific classification
- Kingdom: Animalia
- Phylum: Arthropoda
- Clade: Pancrustacea
- Class: Insecta
- Order: Coleoptera
- Suborder: Polyphaga
- Infraorder: Cucujiformia
- Family: Coccinellidae
- Genus: Coccinella
- Species: C. californica

Binomial name
- Coccinella californica Mannerheim, 1843

Synonyms
- Coccinella californica melanocollis Johnson, 1910

= Coccinella californica =

Species of beetle

Coccinella californica is a ladybird beetle found in California commonly known as the California lady beetle. It has a red elytra that is usually spotless and a mostly black thorax. Its range is the coastal counties north of the Transverse Ranges.

== Description ==
Adults reach a length of about 5.10-6.80 mm. Adults have a black head with two pale spots. The anterior margin of the pronotum is black and there is a pale ventral spot and a dorsal spot. The elytron has small scutellar spot and the sutural margin is dark brown.
