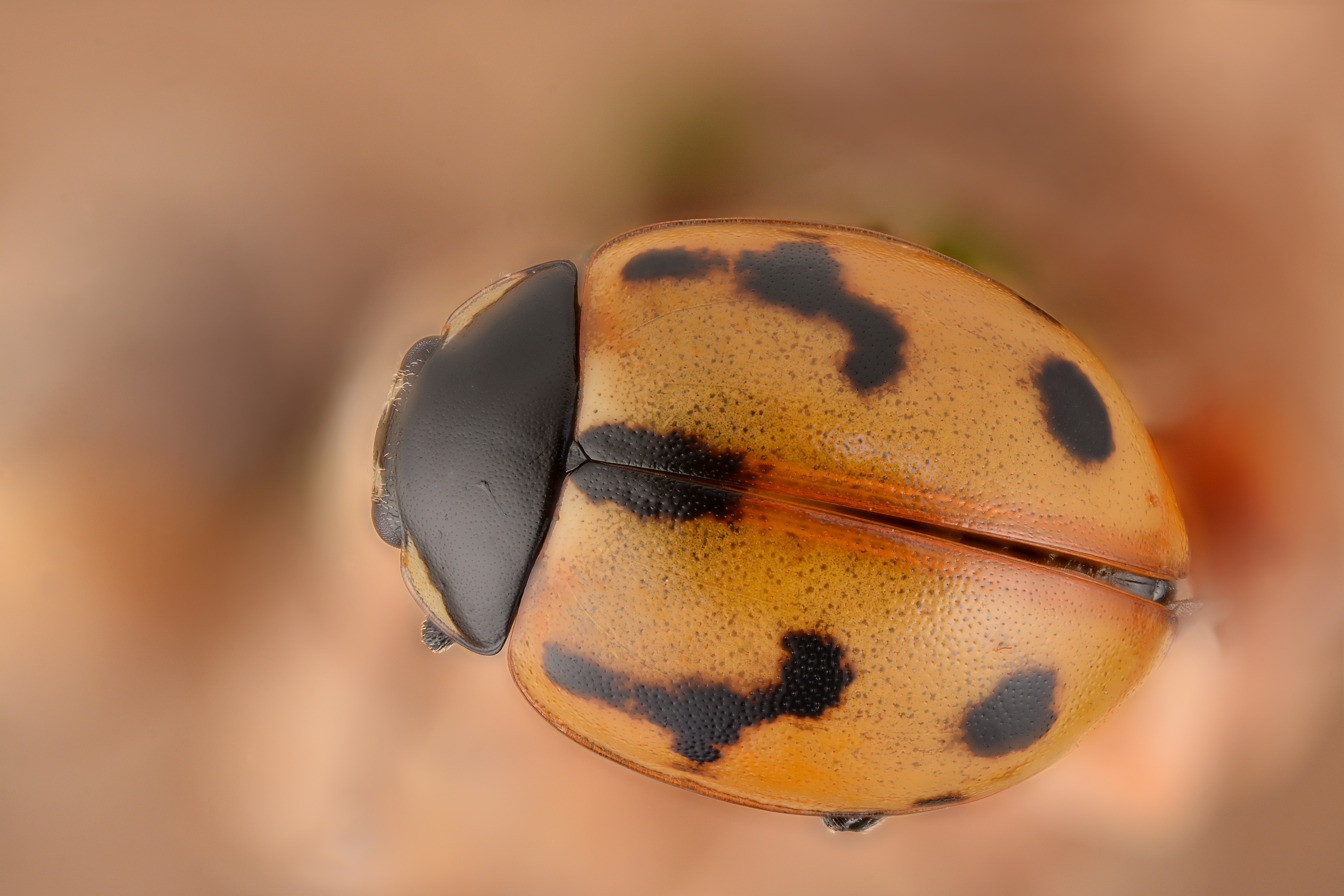

Scientific classification
- Kingdom: Animalia
- Phylum: Arthropoda
- Clade: Pancrustacea
- Class: Insecta
- Order: Coleoptera
- Suborder: Polyphaga
- Infraorder: Cucujiformia
- Family: Coccinellidae
- Genus: Coccinella
- Species: C. hieroglyphica

Binomial name
- Coccinella hieroglyphica Linnaeus, 1758

Synonyms
- Coccinella flexuosa Fabricius, 1777; Coccinella trilineata Herbst, 1783; Coccinella marginemaculata Brahm, 1790; Coccinella ribis Scriba, 1791; Coccinella sinuata Næzén, 1792; Coccinella areata Panzer, 1794; Coccinella octopustulata Thunberg, 1795; Coccinella lineolata Marsham, 1802; Coccinella sinuosa Marsham, 1802; Coccinella impustulata var. rufocincta Haworth, 1812; Coccinella mannerheimii Mulsant, 1850; Coccinella tricuspis Kirby, 1837 (preocc.); Coccinella kirbii Crotch, 1871; Coccinella humboldtiensis Nunenmacher, 1912

= Coccinella hieroglyphica =

Species of beetle

Coccinella hieroglyphica, the hieroglyphic ladybird, is a species of beetle in the family Coccinellidae. It is found in the Palearctic.

Coccinella hieroglyphica is found in Europe, European Russia, Siberia, the Russian Far East, Belarus, Ukraine, Kazakhstan, Mongolia, China, and Korea. In Europe, it is found in the north beyond the Polar circle, and in the south to Northern Italy. They live in heath and moorland habitats to heights of 1,200 m (3,900 ft), on different Ericaceae, feeding on aphids. Other, less preferred, habitats are wet meadows, marshes, wastelands, and mixed forests. Other host plants are Pinus abies and other Pinus species and various Betula species.

Their populations vary greatly from year to year. They fly from May to October and overwinter in coarse woody debris under pines and birches. In the former USSR, it is aphidophagous on Salix species, birches, and Alnus and Poaceae.

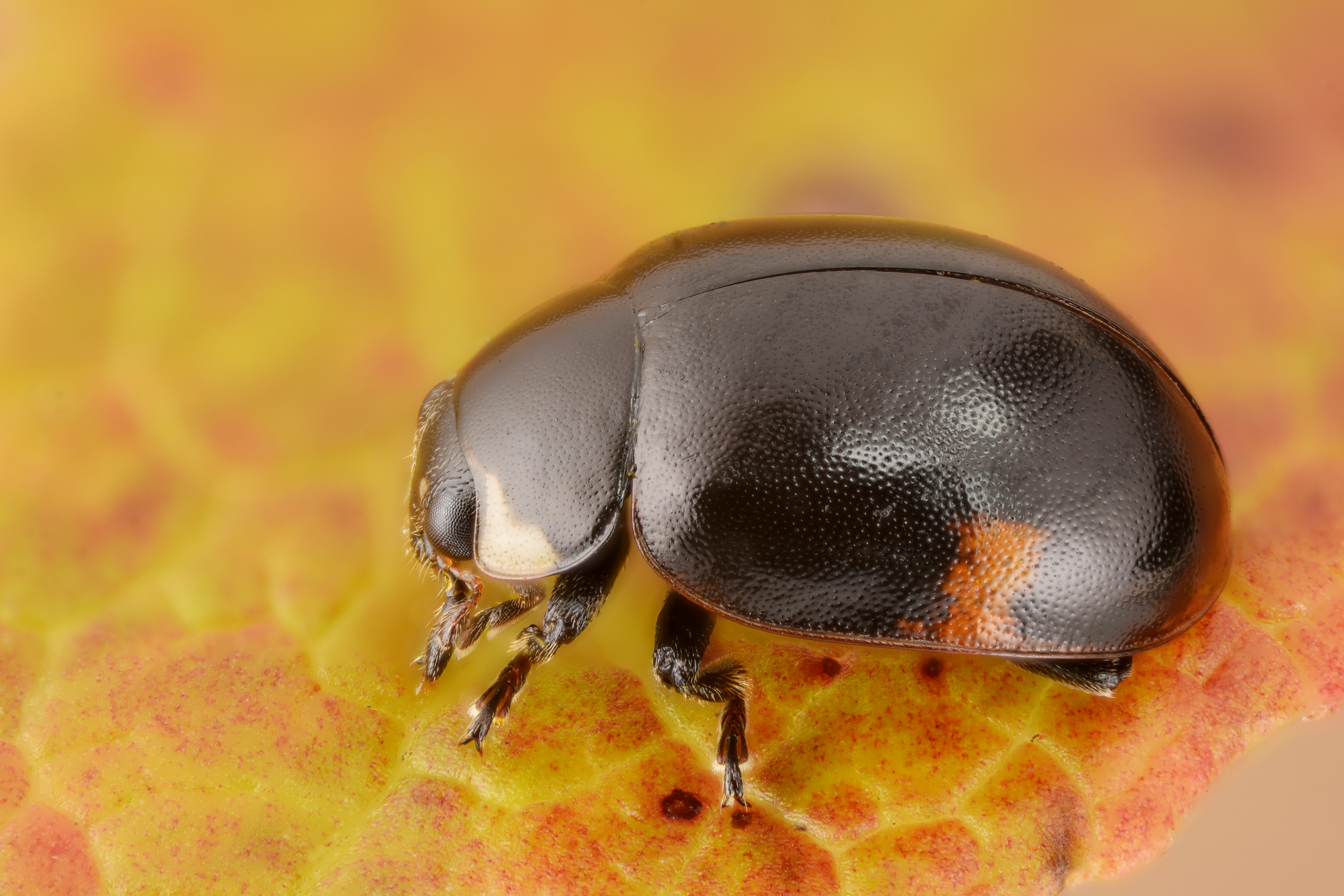

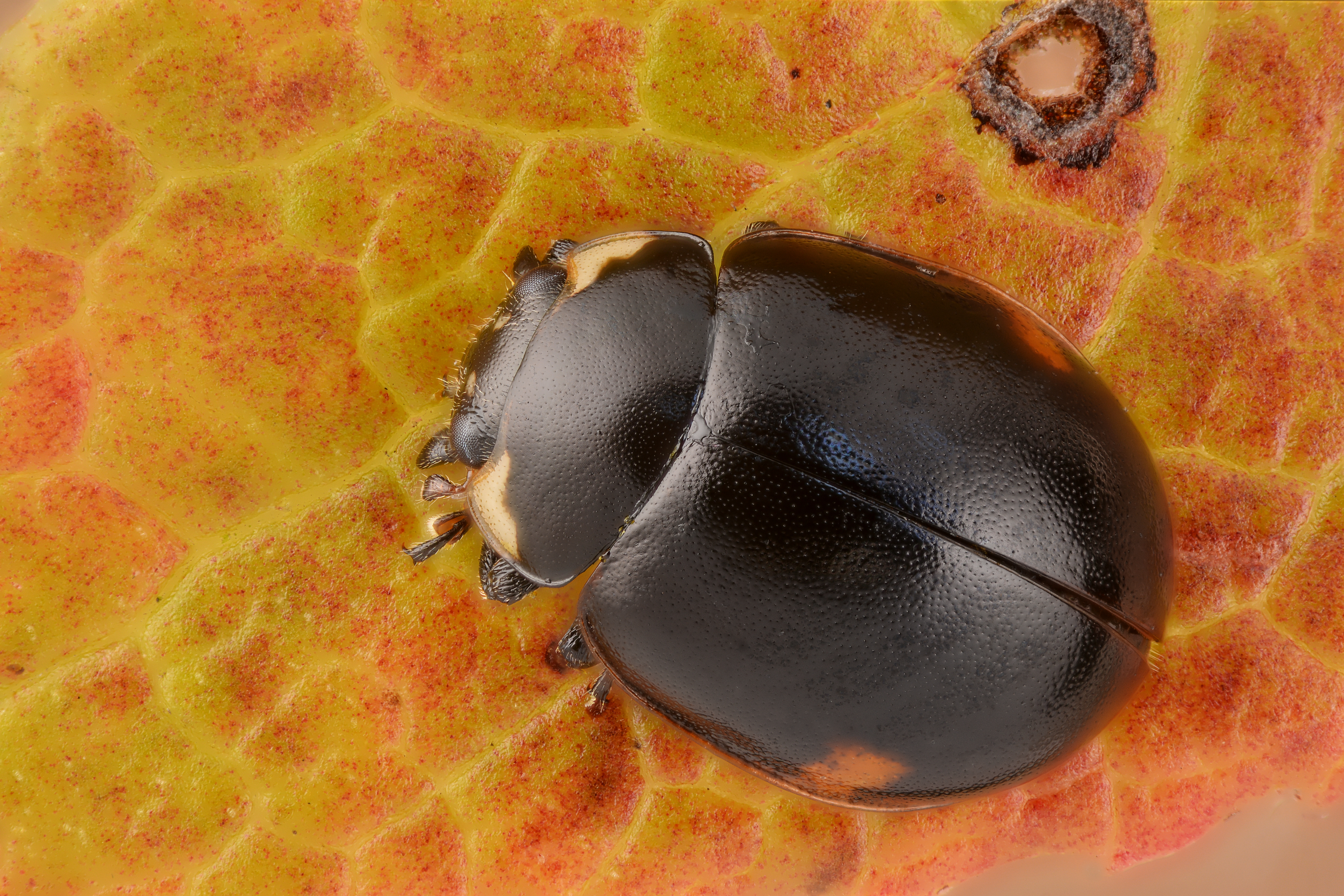
