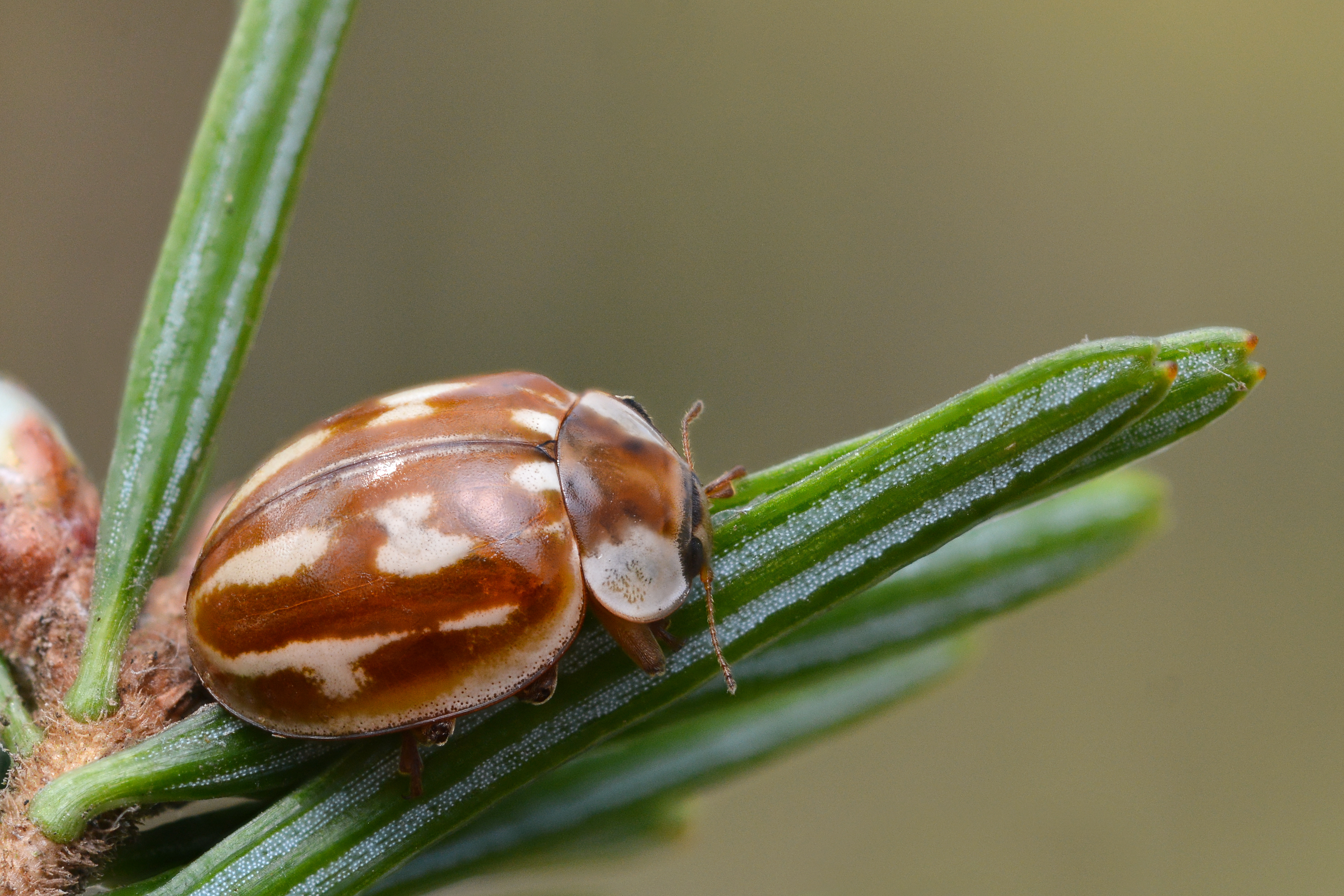

Scientific classification
- Kingdom: Animalia
- Phylum: Arthropoda
- Clade: Pancrustacea
- Class: Insecta
- Order: Coleoptera
- Suborder: Polyphaga
- Infraorder: Cucujiformia
- Family: Coccinellidae
- Genus: Myzia
- Species: M. oblongoguttata

Binomial name
- Myzia oblongoguttata (Linnaeus, 1758)

Synonyms
- Coccinella oblongoguttata Linnaeus, 1758; Neomysia nipponica Yuasa, 1963; Mysia oblongoguttata var. abbreviata Walter, 1882; Mysia oblongoguttata var. fleischeri Walter, 1882; Mysia oblongoguttata var. maculata Walter, 1882; Mysia oblongoguttata var. mixta Walter, 1882; Mysia oblongoguttata var. leprieuri Pic, 1895; Coccinella octoguttata Fabricius, 1787 (nec Thunberg, 1781); Coccinella camschatcensis Gmelin, 1790; Coccinella bisignata Fischer von Waldheim, 1842; Mysia vogelii Schaufuss, 1862; Mysia mulsantii Schaufuss, 1862; Mysia lignicolor Mulsant 1866

= Myzia oblongoguttata =

Species of beetle

Myzia oblongoguttata, commonly known as the striped ladybird, is a species of beetle in family Coccinellidae. It is found in the Palearctic (Europe, North Africa, Asia Minor, European Russia, Caucasus, Siberia, Russian Far East, Belarus, Ukraine, Transcaucasia, Kazakhstan, Middle Asia, Mongolia, North and South Korea, Japan).

== Biology ==
Myzia oblongoguttata occurs only in coniferous and mixed forests (Sarmatic mixed forests) and in birch forest, birch taiga and montane birch forest and grasslands and coastal conifer forests. Adults are found on Pinus sylvestris, Picea abies, Picea obovata, and Betula pendula, most frequently when they are producing pollen. They feed on aphids. The beetles overwinter under peeled-off bark and in coniferous litter. The adults occur from spring to late summer. The new generation usually emerges in August. This is a common species.

== Subspecies ==
- Myzia oblongoguttata oblongoguttata
- Myzia oblongoguttata nipponica (Yuasa, 1963) (Japan)
