= Coccinella difficilis =

Scientific classification
- Kingdom: Animalia
- Phylum: Arthropoda
- Clade: Pancrustacea
- Class: Insecta
- Order: Coleoptera
- Suborder: Polyphaga
- Infraorder: Cucujiformia
- Family: Coccinellidae
- Genus: Coccinella
- Species: C. difficilis

Binomial name
- Coccinella difficilis Crotch, 1873

Synonyms
- Coccinella vandykei Nunenmacher, 1909

Species of beetle

Coccinella difficilis is a species of beetle of the family Coccinellidae. It is found in North America, where it has been recorded from Arizona, California, Nevada, Utah, Oregon, Colorado, Montana, Idaho and Wyoming.

Adults reach a length of about 5–6 mm. Adults have a black head with two pale spots. The anterior margin of the pronotum is black and there is a small pale ventral spot, as well as a dorsal spot.
