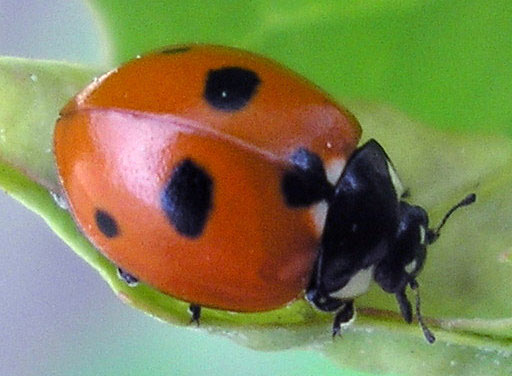

Scientific classification
- Kingdom: Animalia
- Phylum: Arthropoda
- Clade: Pancrustacea
- Class: Insecta
- Order: Coleoptera
- Suborder: Polyphaga
- Infraorder: Cucujiformia
- Family: Coccinellidae
- Genus: Coccinella
- Species: C. quinquepunctata

Binomial name
- Coccinella quinquepunctata Linnaeus, 1758

Synonyms
- Coccinella tripunctata Rossi, 1790

= Coccinella quinquepunctata =

Species of ladybird beetle

Coccinella quinquepunctata is a species of ladybird beetle described by Carl Linnaeus in 1758. Its common names in English include five-spot ladybird. The species overwinters in the pine trees of the Netherlands.
