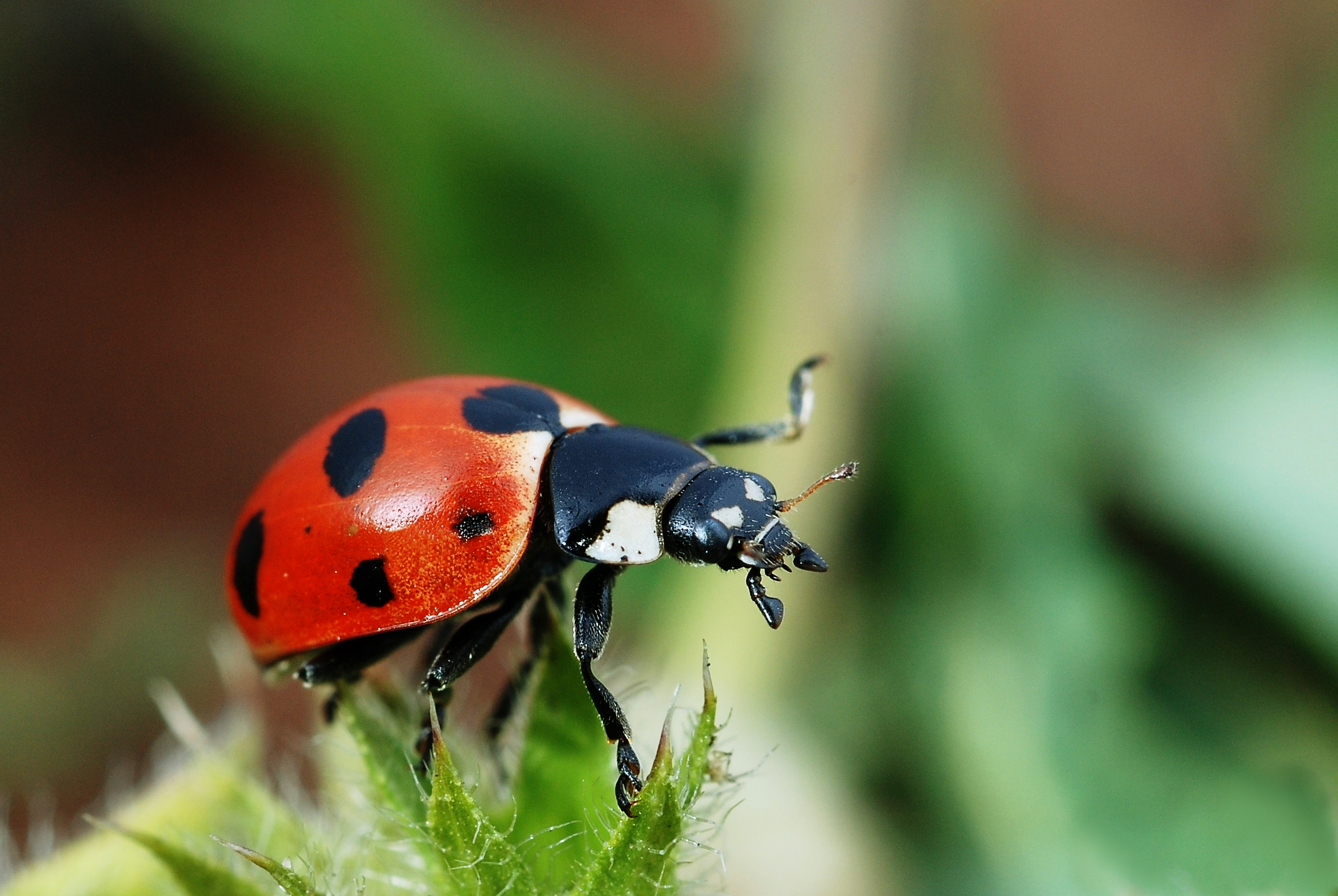

Scientific classification
- Kingdom: Animalia
- Phylum: Arthropoda
- Clade: Pancrustacea
- Class: Insecta
- Order: Coleoptera
- Suborder: Polyphaga
- Infraorder: Cucujiformia
- Family: Coccinellidae
- Genus: Coccinella
- Species: C. magnifica

Binomial name
- Coccinella magnifica Redtenbacher, 1843

Synonyms
- Coccinella distincta Faldermann, 1837; Coccinella labilis Mulsant, 1846; Coccinella dobzhanskii Wu, 1937

= Coccinella magnifica =

Scarce seven-spotted ladybird

Species of beetle

Coccinella magnifica, also known as the scarce seven-spot ladybird, is a species of beetle in the family Coccinellidae. Both the adults and larvae are predators. They are known for their diet of aphids, but will eat many other pests such as soft-scale insects, spider mites, mealybugs, and the eggs of many others. A single larvae will eat about 400 medium size aphids during its development to pupal stage. An adult will eat about 300 aphids before it lays its eggs. Approximately 3 to 10 aphids are eaten for each egg laid, and a female will lay from 50 to 300 eggs in her lifetime. More than 5,000 aphids may be eaten by a single adult ladybug in its lifetime. The scarce 7-spot is often found along with nests of wood ants.

== Distribution ==
It is present in Great Britain, where it is scarce in southern England.
