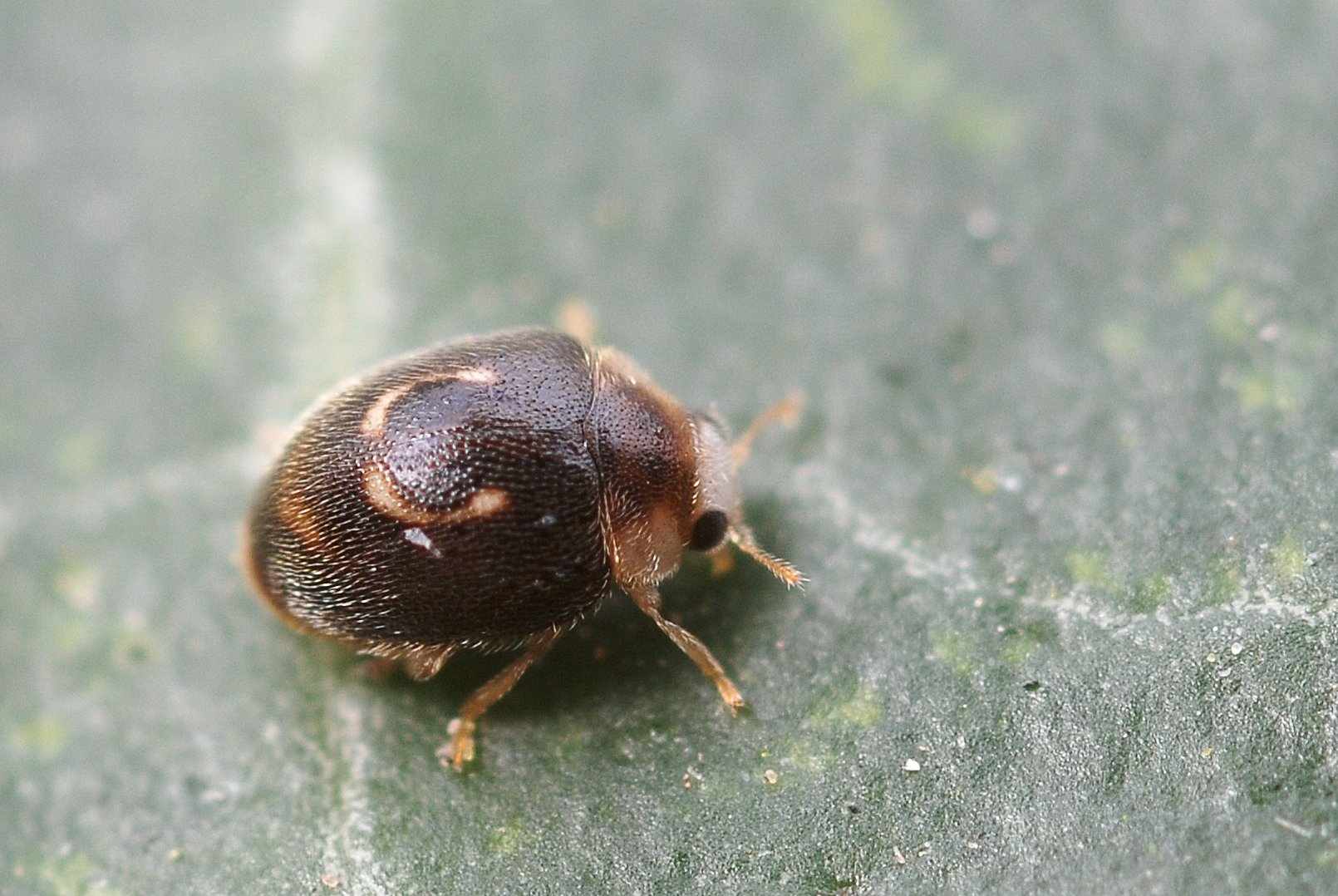

Scientific classification
- Kingdom: Animalia
- Phylum: Arthropoda
- Clade: Pancrustacea
- Class: Insecta
- Order: Coleoptera
- Suborder: Polyphaga
- Infraorder: Cucujiformia
- Family: Coccinellidae
- Genus: Clitostethus
- Species: C. arcuatus

Binomial name
- Clitostethus arcuatus (Rossi, 1794)

Synonyms
- Coccinella arcuata Rossi, 1794; Scymnus (Pullus) abeillei Weise, 1884

= Clitostethus arcuatus =

Species of beetle

Clitostethus arcuatus is a species of beetle of the family Coccinellidae. It is native to Europe and parts of the Middle east including Israel. it has also been reported from Bermuda.

== Description ==
Adults reach a length of about 1.3–1.5 mm. Adults are black to light brown. The lateral area of the pronotum is yellow and the elytron has a yellow band and a dark discal spot.

== Biology ==
They prey on whitefly species.
