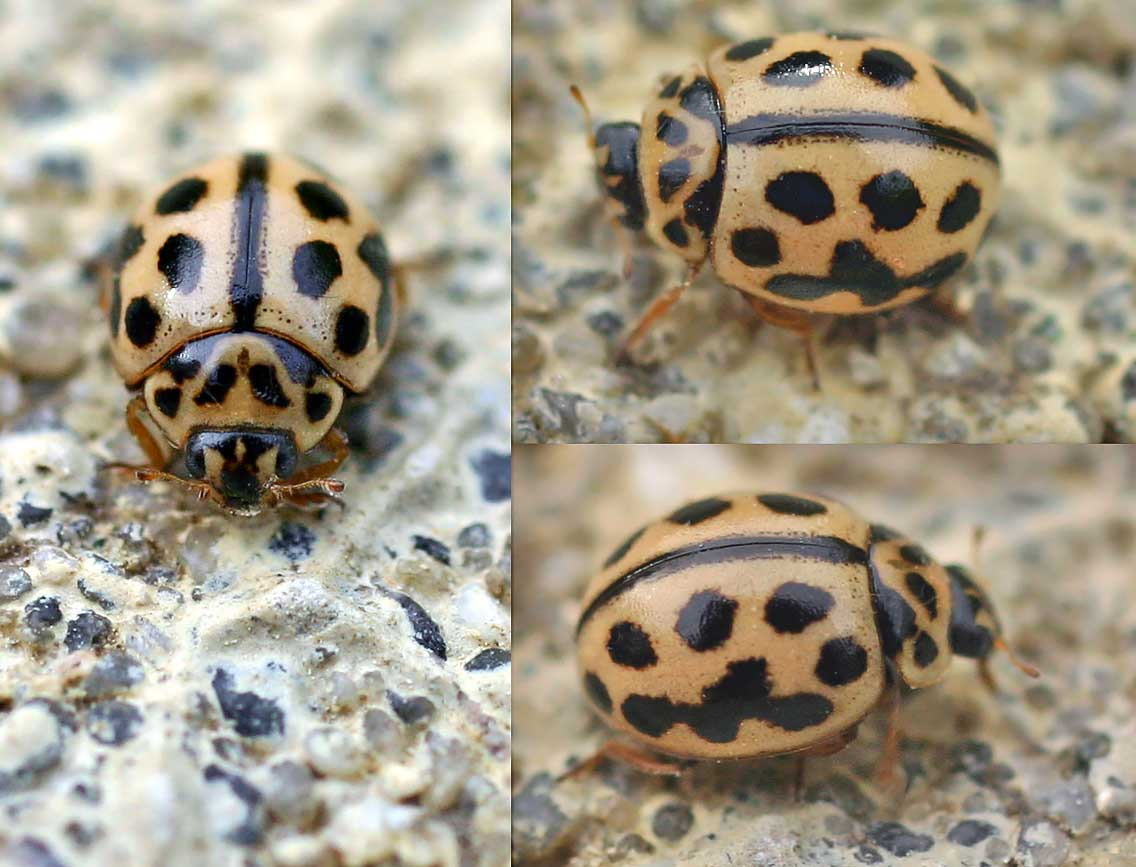

Scientific classification
- Kingdom: Animalia
- Phylum: Arthropoda
- Clade: Pancrustacea
- Class: Insecta
- Order: Coleoptera
- Suborder: Polyphaga
- Infraorder: Cucujiformia
- Family: Coccinellidae
- Genus: Tytthaspis
- Species: T. sedecimpunctata

Binomial name
- Tytthaspis sedecimpunctata (Linnaeus, 1761)

= Tytthaspis sedecimpunctata =

Species of beetle

Tytthaspis sedecimpunctata is a species of beetle in the family Coccinellidae. Its common English name is the sixteen-spot ladybird. It is found in the Palearctic - Europe, North Africa, European Russia, the Caucasus, Belarus, Ukraine, Moldova, Transcaucasia, Northern Kazakhstan, Western Asia and Northwest China. It is an inhabitant of the grass layer occurring on dunes, inland dunes, sandy shores and bodden, in Eurasian steppe or on wastelands and dry meadows and occasionally in marshy meadows. It is recorded as feeding on aphids but also on Pucciniales and powdery mildew, on the pollen on Gramineae, Compositae, and Convolvulaceae, and also on mites and thrips (Thysanoptera)

The 16-spot frequently forms very large aggregations on tree trunks, fence posts, logs and so on during winter. It is a small ladybird of around 2-3mm. It is usually a cream or beige colour, although darker forms do occur. It has a distinctive dark line on the middle of its elytra, and its spots are often fused, with three fused spots often forming a line on either side of the ladybird.

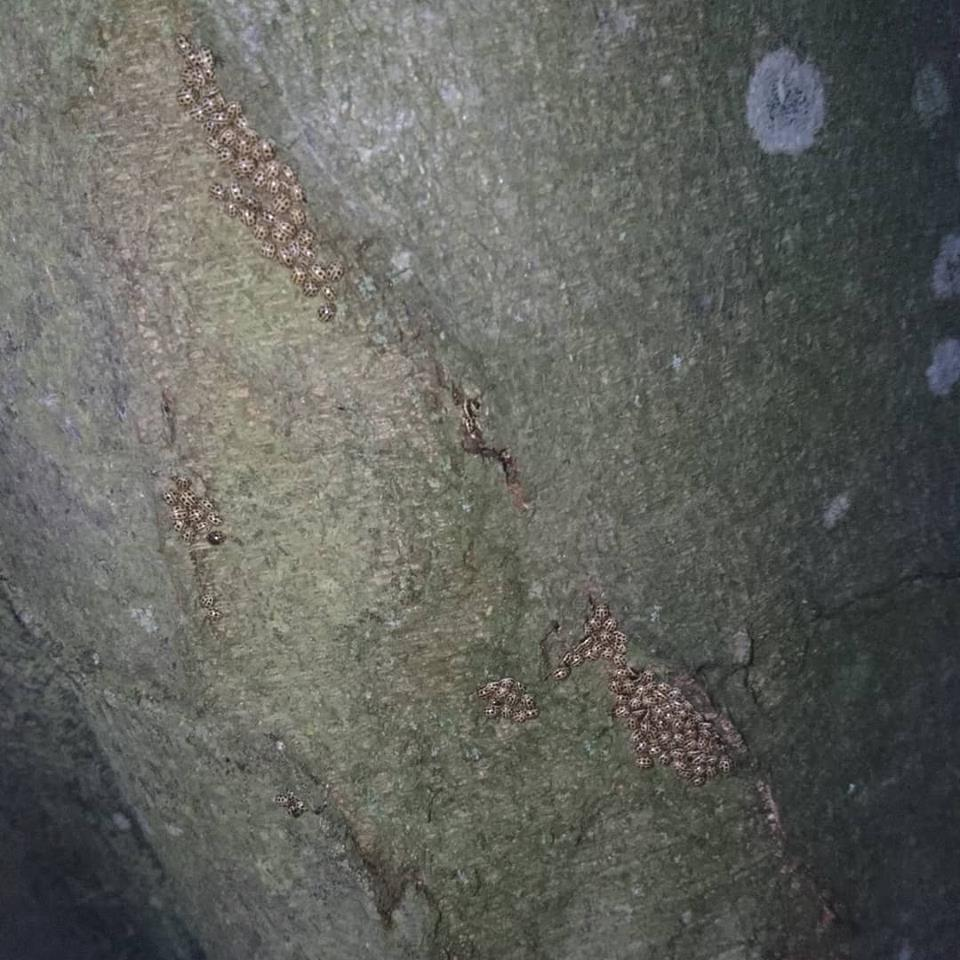
A large group of Tytthaspis sedecimpunctata ladybirds on a tree trunk.
