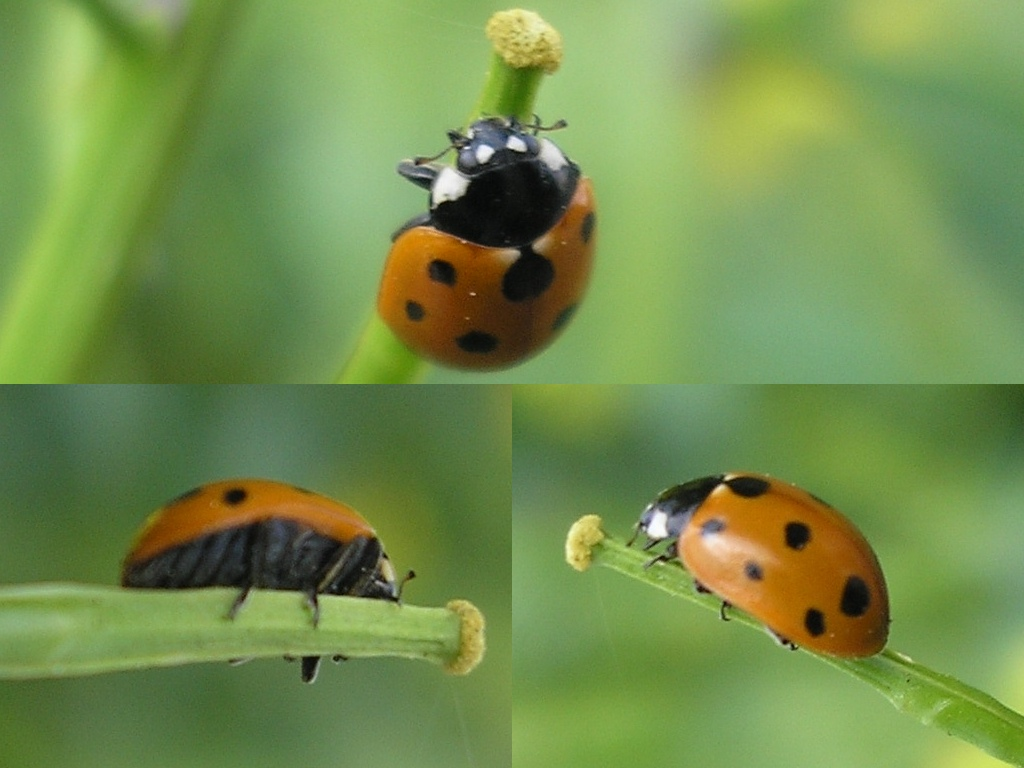

Scientific classification
- Kingdom: Animalia
- Phylum: Arthropoda
- Clade: Pancrustacea
- Class: Insecta
- Order: Coleoptera
- Suborder: Polyphaga
- Infraorder: Cucujiformia
- Family: Coccinellidae
- Genus: Coccinella
- Species: C. undecimpunctata

Binomial name
- Coccinella undecimpunctata (Linnaeus, 1758)

Synonyms
- Coccinella undecimpunctata Linnaeus, 1758; Coccinella undecimpunctata var. confluens Donisthorpe, 1902 (preocc.); Coccinella menetriesi Mulsant, 1850; Coccinella aegyptiaca Reiche, 1861; Coccinella undecimpunctata arabica Mader, 1931; Coccinella undecimpunctata f. bagdadensis Roubal, 1932; Coccinella tripunctata Linnaeus, 1758; Coccinella pontica Dobzhansky, 1927; Coccinella novempunctata Linnaeus, 1758; Coccinella quadrimaculata Fabricius, 1787 (preocc.); Coccinella nigrofasciata Rossi, 1790; Coccinella oculata Thunberg, 1795; Coccinella triangularis Thunberg, 1795; Coccinella collaris Paykull, 1799; Coccinella oblonga Motschulsky, 1849; Coccinella novaezealandiae Colenso, 1888; Coccinella undecimpunctata f. inscutellata Roubal, 1931

= Coccinella undecimpunctata =

Eleven-spot Ladybird

Species of beetle

Coccinella undecimpunctata, the eleven-spot ladybird or eleven-spotted lady beetle, it is native to central Asia, though commonly found in Europe, and formerly North America as its populations are decreasing. It is of the family Coccinellidae, commonly referred to as ladybugs or lady beetles.

== Description ==
C. undecimpunctata is a lady beetle with eleven black spots found on its red/orange elytra. Its size can range from around 4.0 to 5.0mm. It may look as if this beetle has six spots on each elytron, but the black spot in the center of the elytra, just behind the pronotum, counts as just one.

== Distribution ==
Endemic to the Palearctic - Europe, North Africa, European Russia, the Caucasus, Siberia, the Russian Far East, Ukraine, Moldova, Kazakhstan, Middle Asia, Western Asia, Afghanistan, Mongolia, China, Pakistan, and North India. C. undecimpunctata has been introduced to Australia as a biological control agent. It has been said that C. undecimpunctata was introduced to New Zealand as a form of pest control as well, but this has proven to be false.

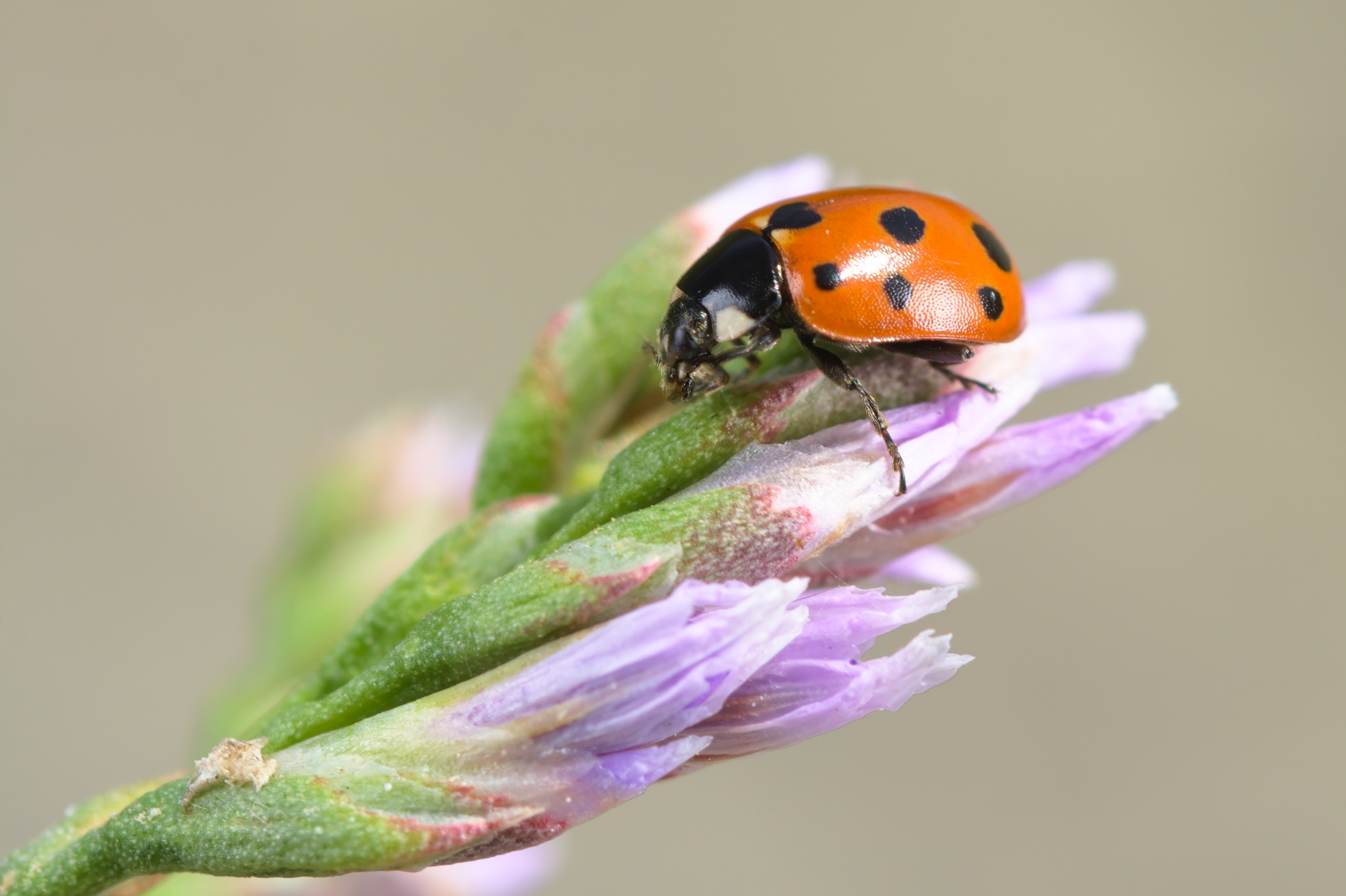
C. undecimpunctata

== Habitat and diet ==
C. undecimpunctata feeds on aphids associated with grasses - in fields, in ruderal biotopes, on steppe (including Pannonian steppe), stone quarries, wastelands, dry forest edges in meadows and coastal meadow, in open habitats with grasses, and near rivers. Frequently in biotopes with Ammophila arenaria it also occurs on alluvial soils, detritus, on dead grass and in biotopes with Salix purpurea. It is salt-resistant and can feed on aphids inhabiting Atriplex tatarica and other grasses associated with saline areas.

== Biology ==
=== Reproduction ===
C. undecimpunctata reproduce sexually, and have a tendency to cannibalize other individuals'/pairs' eggs. They do this because it improves their own eggs' viability, increases their fecundity, and decreases development time of remaining offspring. However, these benefits depend on which sex is cannibalizing eggs—paternal cannibalization increases fecundity and egg viability, whereas maternal cannibalization only increases egg viability. If both parents cannibalize eggs, pupation and general developmental time decreases.

== Symbionts ==
=== Wolbachia ===
Wolbachia is a genus of maternally inherited bacteria that infects mainly arthropods. This bacteria kills male offspring in the egg, favoring female offspring—If host eggs are exposed to a heat treatment, the bacteria dies and leaves no molecular trace.

== Relationship to humans ==
=== As a form of pest control ===
Lady beetles are used as a form of pest control for various pests as well as by various modes, whether they be used within a house for hobby plants, in a garden for food, or for more industrial-like settings. Biological forms of pest control are used because they are less harmful than insecticides, which can have negative or even dangerous effects on the plant, beneficial insects, and even humans. C. undecimpunctata has been proven to be an excellent measure of pest control for cotton mealybugs (Phenacoccus solenopsis), though females tend to eat more over their lifespan than males do. Another pest, C. undecimpunctata, is known for being used as pest control for aphids. Rather than just using the beetles as adults for pest control, it has been shown that they eat just under 1.5 times more in their fourth instar than they do as adults. It is best to release C. undecimpunctata populations when pest populations are low.

=== Insecticides ===
While some prefer to use biological pest control such as releasing predators into an area to get rid of pests, insecticides are still used widely. Sometimes biological and chemical pest control are used simultaneously, or the natural fauna in the area are not accounted for when insecticides are used—chlorpyrifos, deltamethrin, and spinosad are insecticides used on a common prey of C. undecimpunctata, the cabbage aphid (Brevicoryne brassicae). While these insecticides are much more effective on the prey, B. brassicae, both chlorpyrifos and spinosad are still much more unsafe for C. undecimpunctata than deltamethrin. Other insecticides like pirimicarb and pymetrozine are recommended as they do not have a significant impact on C. undecimpunctata, where buprofezin, when sprayed on larvae, decreased survival rate to adulthood by 33%.

== Subspecies ==
- Coccinella undecimpunctata undecimpunctata
- Coccinella undecimpunctata boreolitoralis Donisthorpe, 1918
- Coccinella undecimpunctata menetriesi Mulsant, 1850
- Coccinella undecimpunctata tripunctata Linnaeus, 1758
