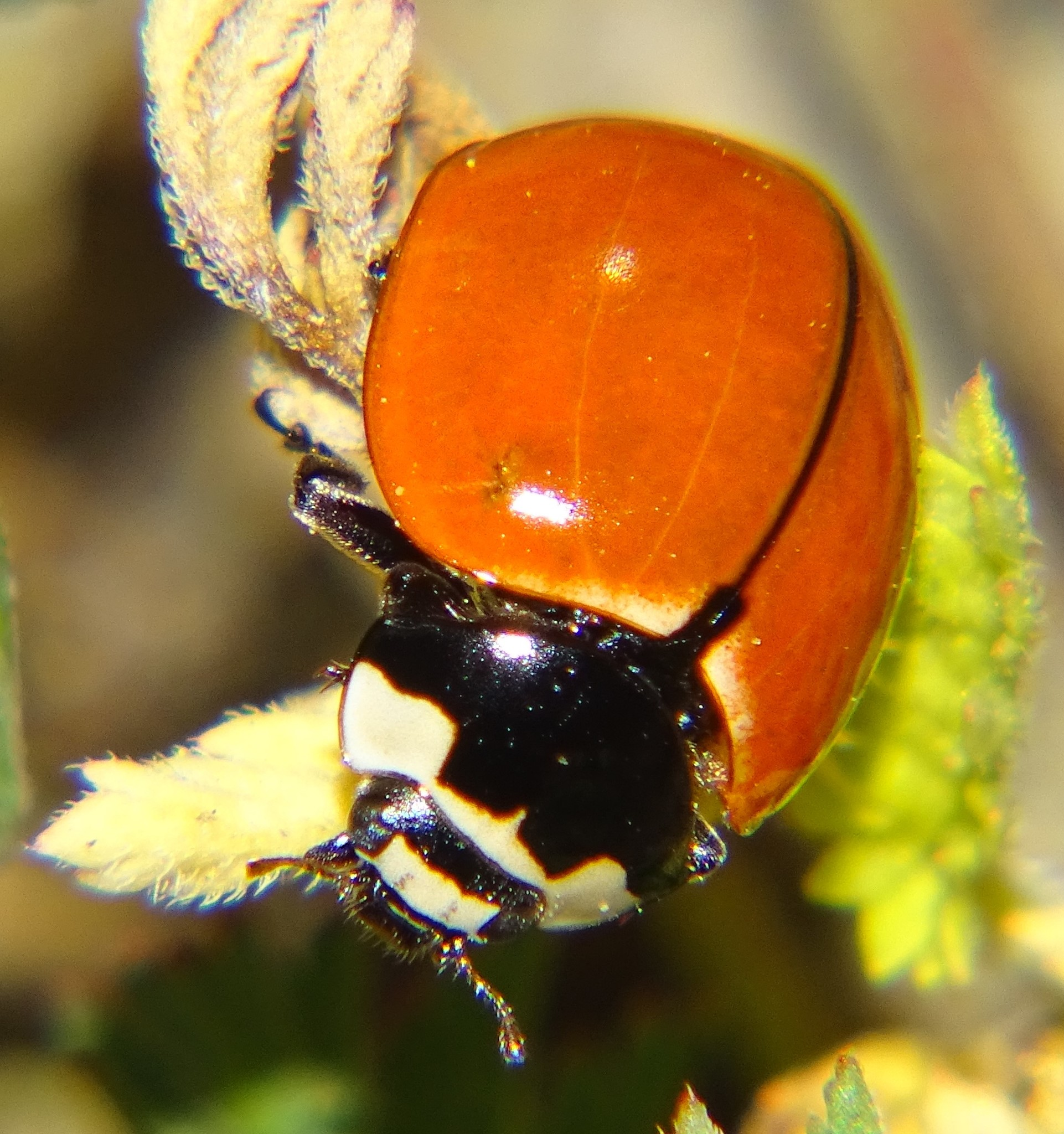

Scientific classification
- Kingdom: Animalia
- Phylum: Arthropoda
- Clade: Pancrustacea
- Class: Insecta
- Order: Coleoptera
- Suborder: Polyphaga
- Infraorder: Cucujiformia
- Family: Coccinellidae
- Genus: Coccinella
- Species: C. novemnotata

Binomial name
- Coccinella novemnotata Herbst, 1793

Synonyms
- Coccinella franciscana Mulsant, 1853; Coccinella degener Casey, 1899

= Coccinella novemnotata =

Species of beetle

Coccinella novemnotata, the nine-spotted ladybug or nine-spotted lady beetle or C9, is a species of ladybug in the family Coccinellidae native to North America. This beetle was once ubiquitous across the continent but it experienced a sharp and drastic decline around the 1960s. As a rare species, the nine-spotted ladybug has received much attention from researchers who wish to understand the causes of its decline and restore the population of this charismatic beetle to benefit from their aphidophagous nature as biocontrol agents in agriculture.

== Taxonomy ==
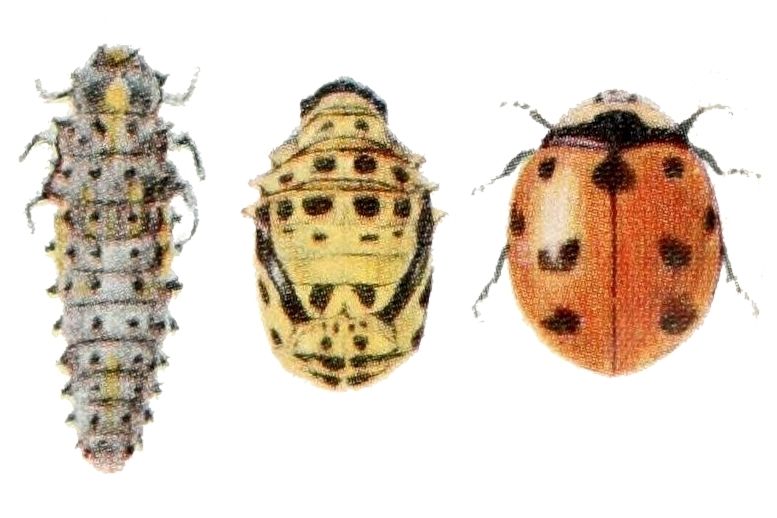
Larval Instar, Pupa, and Adult Coccinella novemnotata Diagram

Although this family has been the focus of many studies in the 19th and 20th century to delineate the subfamily and tribe relations, there is no consensus as most studies based on morphology contradict. However, a 2011 study based on molecular sequencing data has clarified and produced a few detailed phylogenetic trees. Coccinella novemnotata belongs to the subfamily Coccinellinae under family Coccinellidae. This family falls under the superfamily Cucujoidea and suborder Polyphaga. A number of molecular phylogeny studies agree with pre-existing morphology-based relationships that Coccinellidae are a monophyletic group within Cucujiformia in the Cerylonid series, sister to a clade in Endomychidae or Corylophidae. Further molecular phylogenetics studies are needed to delineate and establish subfamilies. Two studies presented evidence that Coccinellinae is the only monophyletic subfamily within Coccinellidae, as opposed to Coccidulinae, Epilachninae, Scymninae and Chilocorinae which are paraphyletic groups. In addition, there was evidence of the tribe Chilocorini being sister to Coccinellinae.

== Description and identification ==
The nine-spotted ladybug can be identified by the four black spots on each of its elytra, a single spot split between the elytra, and a black suture between the elytra. Its pronotum is black, with two connected white marks at the front of its head. They range from 4.7 to 7.0 millimeters (0.19-0.28 inches) long and the elytra can range from yellow to orange and spotted or spotless. Males can be distinguished by a spot on their anterior coxae and stripe on the femora.

== Life cycle and behavior ==
Coccinella novemnotata is a holometabolous bivoltine species. Diapauses are dependent on photoperiod length, temperature, and prey availability. Adults enter diapause through the summer and winter and emerge in the autumn and early spring, respectively. They reproduce in early spring and oviposit in early autumn. Adult females determine the oviposition sites and eggs are laid in clutches attached to thin branches, leaves, or other surrounding material. The C9 holometabolous life cycle begins at an egg, larvae (4 instars), prepupa, pupa, and adult stages. C. novemnotata and other beetles in the subfamily Coccinellinae lack a covering during the pupal stage; instead, the larval skin is shed off. The two most significant sources of mortality are interspecific predation and cannibalism. Larvae are documented to prey on smaller, earlier instar larvae. Adults consume eggs, pupae, and molting individuals which are significantly more vulnerable during these sessile states. In times of general prey scarcity, intraguild predation is shown to increase as eggs are better sources of nutrients crucial for larval development compared to their main diet of aphids. Some studies show evidence that C. novemnotata suffers from higher rates of egg predation by other species like the Coccinella septempunctata and cannibalism of its own eggs.

== Habitat ==
The nine-spotted ladybeetles are nomadic and can thrive in a great variety of habitats across the continent, based on factors such as aphid or prey density, mate distribution, and seasonal availability of herbaceous material to facilitate breeding. Within agricultural landscapes, Coccinella novemnotata exist in cotton, alfalfa, corn, and soybean fields as a candidate for biological control of aphids. In addition, they can be found in suburban parks and gardens. In more natural settings, they are found in open areas with shrubbery and small trees (deciduous or coniferous), meadows, prairie grassland, and riparian zones.

== Historic and extant distribution ==
C. novemnotata has historically been native in North America— the United States and southern Canada. In the 1970s–1980s, Coccinella novemnotata was reported to be one of the most prevalent species in the Northeastern and continental US, and the southern regions of Canada. In Canada, the nine-spotted ladybeetle was once abundant from Vancouver Island to Quebec. One paper from 1998 also reported sightings in Guatemala and Mexico.

C. novemnotata has become rare across its native range. It was once the most commonly collected coccinellid in the Northeastern United States until the early 1990s with the last individuals collected from Maryland, Pennsylvania, and Delaware between 1986 and 1988, and another collection in Maine in 1992. A prominent effort of citizen science originating from Cornell University in New York has reported tens of sightings of the rare beetle in western states of the US, with nearly no sighting on the eastern side. In 2006, a singular C9 was located in Washington, DC after 14 years. In 2008, over 40 individual C. novemnotata and over 30 live specimens were collected exclusively from the western states. More recently, C. novemnotata has only been collected sporadically in the Midwest and west coast of the United States. A 2015 Canadian report shows larger populations in provinces of British Columbia and Alberta, and smaller sightings in Ontario.

== Conservation status ==
Invasive coccinellid species and changing agricultural habitats have been considered as possible explanations for their drastic decline, but recent studies do not suggest a correlation between C. novemnotata densities and invasive species density and land-use change.

NatureServe conferred a G5 global rank on Coccinella novemnotata as a secure species at a low possibility of extinction. The Committee on the Status of Endangered Wildlife in Canada (COSEWIC) and Canadian Species at Risk Act (SARA) listed the nine-spotted lady bug as endangered in 2016 and 2023, respectively. Canada NatureServe ranks the beetle as N2 or imperiled. Coccinella novemnotata is not protected by the U.S. Endangered Species Act.

While numerous contributors to their stark decline were hypothesized, no singular cause has been identified so far. The introduction and establishment of the nonnative Harmonia axyridis (HA) and Coccinella septempunctata (C7) has come to dominate up to 90% of the coccinellid population in some U.S. states. In general, nonnative species compete for resources and are a significant source of intraguild predation. However, many population dynamic studies agree that the boom in invasive species only slightly coincides with the C9 decline. Pesticides like neonicotinoids and pyrethroid-based regulators have synergistic negative effects on lady beetles if they contact or consume these substances through prey or plant material. Other than pesticides, habitat loss through abandoned agricultural plots and further urbanization could further hinder the successful reproduction and survival of these ladybeetles.

While efforts to document the nine-spotted ladybug are extensive compared to other declining species, their mobile and generalist nature hinder concerted efforts at conservation. Although they only exist in low abundance compared to other species within the aphidophagous body of coccinellids, it is hypothesized that the local and minute differences in dietary or environmental niches of other, more popular species like C7 or HA allow for a small population of Coccinella novemnotata to coexist. Land heterogeneity, even the introduction and establishment of non-native weeds capable of supporting aphids, combined with their generalism may contribute to their continued presence. Although evidently less abundant, populations of Coccinella novemnotata may be more stable despite their significant decline.

== State insect of New York ==
The nine-spotted ladybug has been the state insect of New York since 1989, though its numbers have declined as the numbers of introduced species such as the seven-spotted ladybug and Asian lady beetle have increased. It was for some time thought extinct in New York, so in 2006, the state considered designating the pink spotted ladybug as state insect instead, but the bill did not pass the Senate. In 2006 the nine-spotted ladybug was rediscovered in Virginia with the first East Coast sighting in 14 years. In 2011, about 20 of these ladybugs were found on a farm in Amagansett, New York, the first such sighting in the state since 1982.
