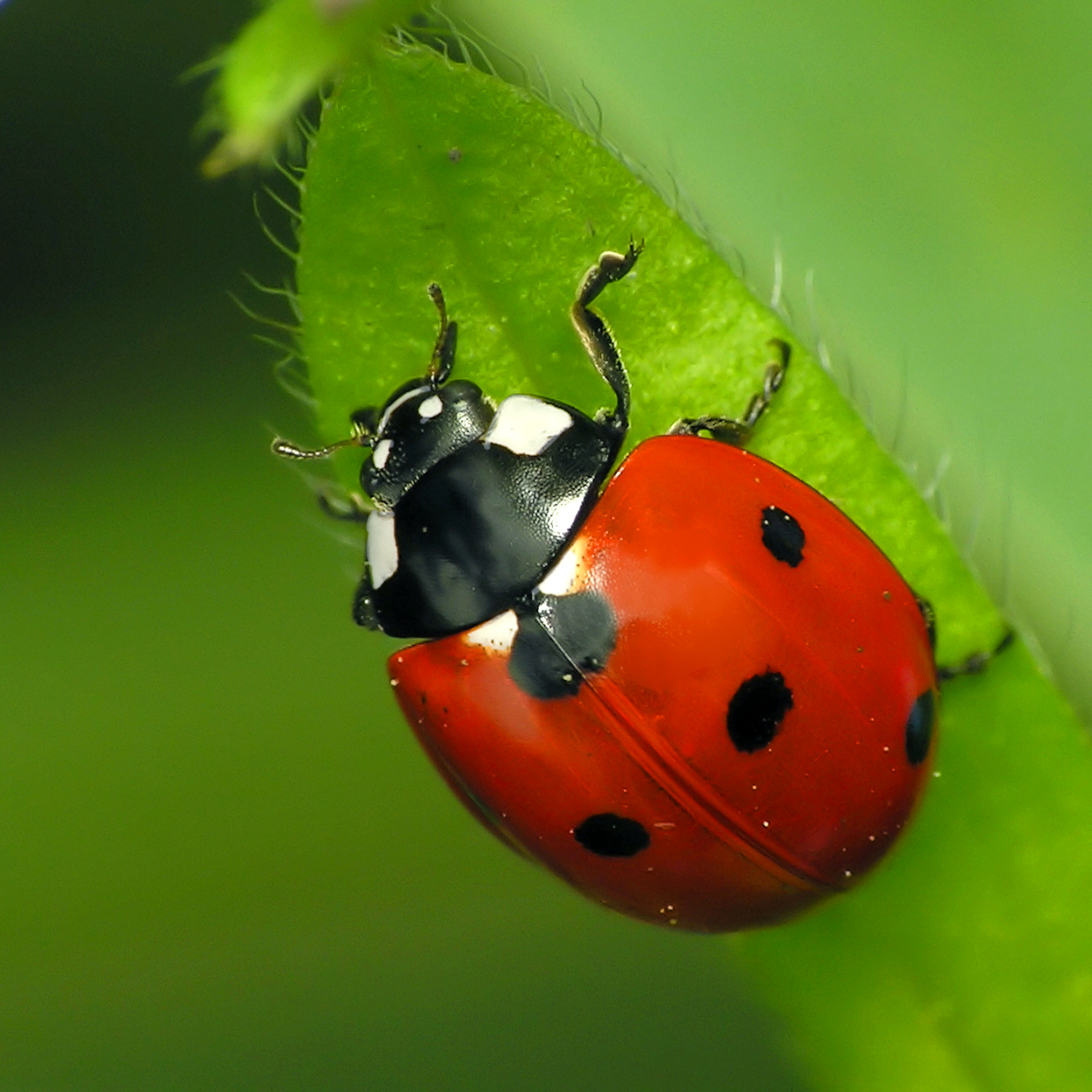

Scientific classification
- Kingdom: Animalia
- Phylum: Arthropoda
- Clade: Pancrustacea
- Class: Insecta
- Order: Coleoptera
- Suborder: Polyphaga
- Infraorder: Cucujiformia
- Family: Coccinellidae
- Genus: Coccinella
- Species: C. septempunctata

Binomial name
- Coccinella septempunctata (Linnaeus, 1758)

Synonyms
- Coccinella (Coccinella) septempunctata Linnaeus, 1758; Coccinella algerica Kovář, 1977; Coccinella brucki Mulsant, 1866; Coccinella divaricata Olivier, 1808; Coccinella confusa Wiedemann, 1823

= Coccinella septempunctata =

Species of beetle

Coccinella septempunctata, commonly known as the seven-spot ladybird (Note: Claire Beverley states that "seven-spot ladybird" is the "preferred common name".) (in North America, seven-spotted ladybug, seven-spotted lady beetle), often abbreviated C-7, is a carnivorous beetle native to Europe, most of Asia, and North Africa. It inhabits many regions with a temperate climate. The beetle has been introduced to several other areas, including North America as a biological pest control agent to combat aphid infestations. It is one of approximately 5,000 species of ladybird worldwide. Tatia Bauer states that C. septempunctata's ability to adapt to many different habitats makes it "one of the most successful aphidophagous insects".

C. septempunctata was first described and named in 1758 by the Swedish biologist Carl Linnaeus. Coccinella, the name of the genus, comes from the Latin coccineus for the colour "scarlet". The common name is reflected in the Latin name for the species, septem meaning "seven" and punctata meaning "spotted".

C. septempunctata's elytra is red in colour, with three black spots on each wing. A further spot appears where the two wings join, giving a total of seven black spots. Their principal diet is aphids, on which they also depend for development and reproduction. When aphids are scarce, seven-spot ladybirds will survive on alternative food sources such as pollen, nectar, thrips and whitefly, but they cannot reproduce during that time. Predators of C. septempunctata include birds, small mammals, spiders, and other Coccinellidae.

== Description ==
The adult Coccinella septempunctata has an oval, convex shape. It has a body length of 6.5–7.8 mm (0.26–0.31 in) and a width of about 4 mm (0.16 in), with orange-red elytra (forewings) and seven black spots on the elytra. There is one black spot next to the beetle's scutellum where the two elytra meet. There are also two white patches on the elytra just ahead of this black spot. The remaining six black spots are distributed across the elytra, three on each. The size and position of these six spots on the elytra may vary between individuals. Spot fusions and melanic forms are rare. Additionally, C. septempunctata has two white spots on the front of the pronotum on each side of the inner edge of its eyes. The underside of the beetle's abdomen, the pronotum, and the legs are black.

Sexual dimorphism exists in C. septempunctata, although the differences are subtle and microscopic. The shape of the seventh abdominal segment (sternite) is different in males and females. Males have four types of setae on their front legs that are used for traction, whereas females only have three. Females have a greater mass and are slightly broader than males. Males have an average of 18 chemosensory (sensory receptor) basiconic sensilla on their labial palps, while females have only 16. Examining the appearance of the seventh sternite has been found to be a reliable method of determining the sex of C. septempunctata specimens.

=== Larval instars ===
C. septempunctata eggs are 1 mm (0.04 in) long, orange or yellow in colour, and spindle shaped. The newly hatched larva of the first instar is 1–2 mm (0.04–0.08 in) long, but increases to about 8 mm (0.31 in) after four instars. They are highly segmented and can vary in colour depending on the temperature, although they are generally dull black with a pale brown line along the dorsal side of the abdomen. The tubercules and hairs are sparse and small. The relatively long legs lighten towards the end. The fourth instar is dark grey to black with black tubercles emitting fine hairs. On the first and fourth abdominal segments, the dorso- and ventro-lateral tubercles are orange, and the meso- and metathorax are a pale grey.

Pupae are about 6 mm (0.24 in) long, and the colour usually varies from grey to black, but can often be pale orange with dark triangle-shaped marks across the middle, with four dark spots on the anterior surface. The black pigment in the pupa decreases as the temperature changes during its development. The pupa's hard exoskeleton develops during the fourth instar, and is roughly the same size as a full-grown seven-spot ladybird.

== Reproduction and lifecycle ==
Coccinella septempunctata has a four-stage life cycle: egg to four larval instars, to pupa, to adult. The cycle time from egg through to adult ladybird is about six weeks. C. septempunctata can breed up to five generations per year.

The breeding season begins towards the end of spring, and reproduction occurs through copulation. Ladybirds start breeding as soon as they reach sexual maturity, which occurs ten to fourteen days after they emerge as adults. Courtship is initiated by male ladybirds, but immature females or females ready to lay eggs will resist a male's advances. Females release volatile sex pheromones ("calling behaviour") to attract males. Females that have recently mated are less likely to call than unmated females, and the presence of other ladybirds does not appear to influence calling frequency. The seven-spot ladybird breeding is polygynandrous; female ladybirds mating with multiple males increases fecundity, the viability of the eggs, and the percentage of successful offspring.

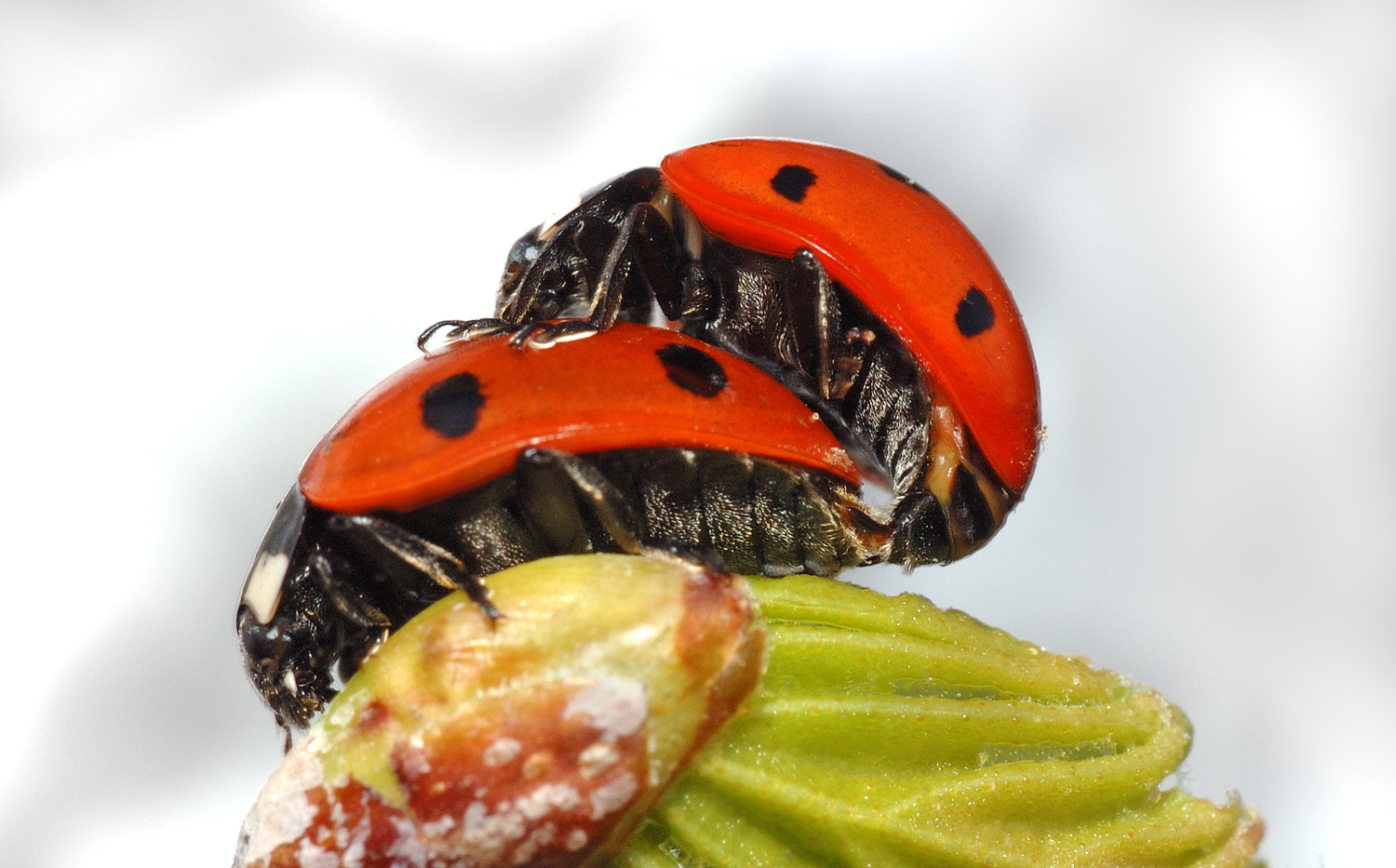
Seven-spot ladybirds mating

In summer, female C. septempunctata with fertilized eggs will start laying them in clusters of about ten to thirty, on leaves, stems and other vegetation. Using olfactory signals, they avoid laying them in areas that already have C. septempunctata eggs. This species often produces more eggs than the environment can support, which increases offspring mortality, but this is beneficial when aphid populations are high. On average, female ladybirds lay between 250 and 500 eggs in their lifetime.

C. septempunctata larvae hatch from the eggs after about four days, although this timeframe depends on ambient temperatures. This species has four progressively larger instars, the length of which is influenced by temperature and the availability of aphids. The larvae begin by eating their own eggshells, and then any infertile eggs nearby. When the fourth instar is ready to pupate, it stops feeding for a day and attaches its abdomen to the substrate. The C. septempunctata pupal stage lasts for about eight days, after which the ladybird emerges with soft elytra and no pigmentation. The black and red colours of the beetle's elytra develop from melanins, and the lighter colours evolve from carotenes.

C. septempunctata do not provide any parental care for their young. The role of male ladybirds is purely to impregnate females, while the role of female ladybirds is only to produce eggs and deposit them on safe substrates with sufficient food for the larvae. Adult C. septempunctata have a lifespan of about one to two years, which is dependent on whether they survive through the winter.

== Behavior and ecology ==
Coccinella septempunctata has motility and can fly. It is active during the day and dormant at night. During hibernation, seven-spot ladybird adults gather in clusters for warmth and protection, and to ensure that when they exit diapause, they will already have potential mates for breeding. When preparing to hibernate, C. septempunctata emit a pheromone to attract other ladybirds to their overwintering site. This particular chemical cue has been identified as 2-isopropyl-3-methoxy-pyrazine. C. septempunctata also detects chemical cues to locate prey. Aphids release a pheromone to warn other aphids of predators, and some plants release particular chemicals when they are infested with aphids. Seven-spot ladybirds are attracted to both types of cues.

=== Diet ===
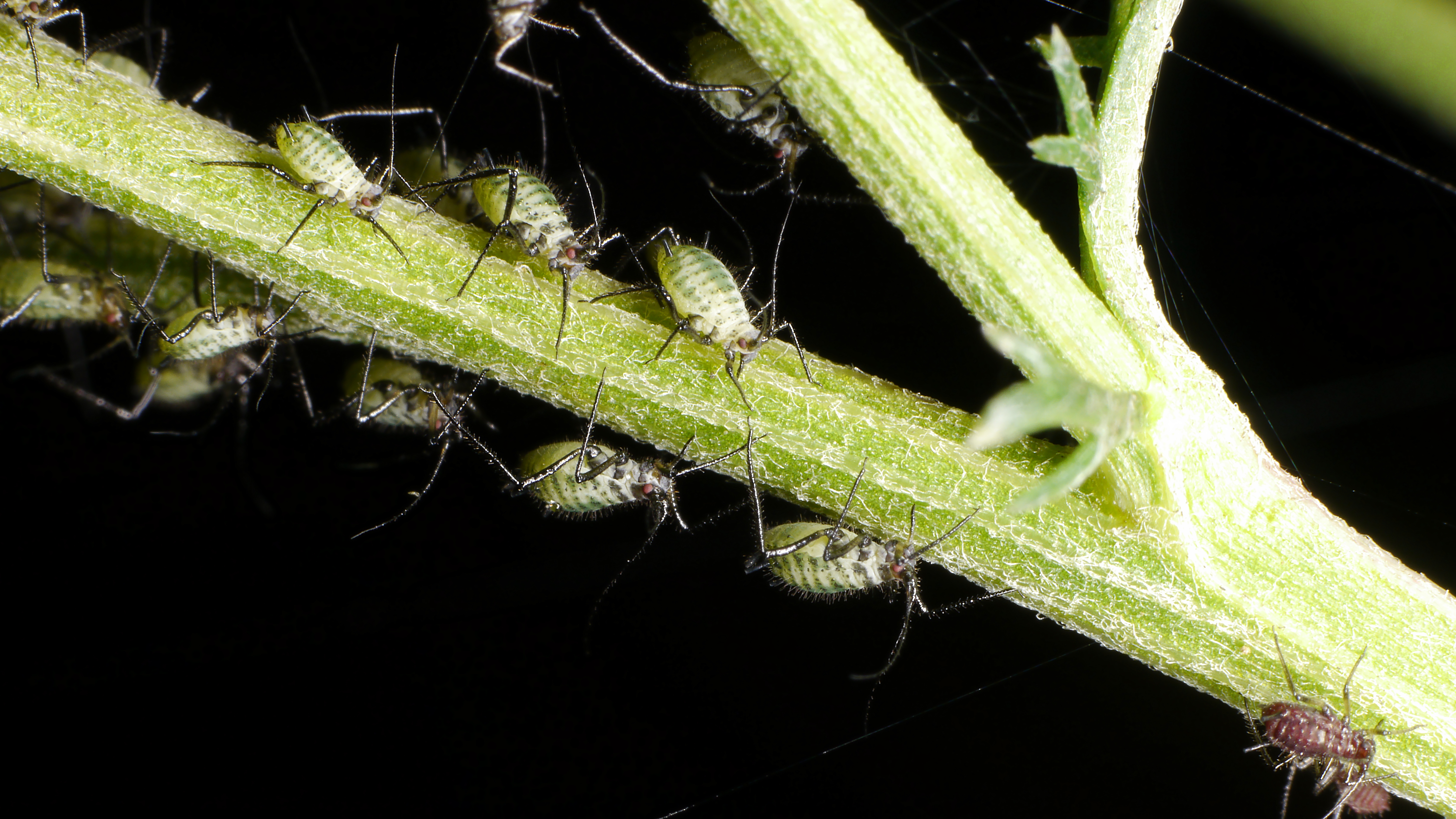
Aphids on a plant host; aphids are the seven-spot ladybird's staple diet

The adult and larval stages of Coccinella septempunctata feed on aphids, which are essential for their own development and reproduction. They consume at least twenty-four different species of aphid. Some aphid species, such as the lupin aphid (Macrosiphum albifrons), are harmful to seven-spot ladybirds. M. albifrons feed largely on alkaloid-rich lupin plants, and absorb compounds from the host plant that are toxic to some coccinellid species. Gruppe and Roemer stated that these aphids "have a narcotizing effect when eaten by C. septempunctata". Christy Finlayson et al. stated that studies showed that M. albifrons consumed by C. septempunctata interfere with the ladybird's development. C. septempunctata generally avoids M. albifrons, particularly in areas where the seven-spot ladybird has been introduced and not previously exposed to these aphids. Coccinellids native to those areas, for example Coccinella trifasciata, have evolved to tolerate the toxic compounds; they consume M. albifrons without competing with introduced species for prey.

C. septempunctata is carnivorous and polyphagous, although not as broadly polyphagous as other ladybug species like Harmonia axyridis and Coleomegilla maculata, which can successfully develop and reproduce on a diet of non-aphid food. Aphid populations are seasonal, and peak in spring and early summer. When aphids become scarce, C. septempunctata will switch to alternative sources of food, on which they can survive, but not reproduce. Alternate food sources include nectar, pollen, whitefly and thrips. C. septempunctata larvae will also feed on other coccinellidae larvae if there is a shortage of aphids. Some adult seven-spot ladybirds will even resort to eating conspecific eggs and larvae. Bauer states that "Intraguild predation and cannibalism are major pressures in this species and family."

C. septempunctata is generally euryphagous in its ability to eat alternative sources of food. In preparation for overwintering, and when aphid populations have declined, seven-spot ladybirds feed on the pollen of flowering plants in the Compositae and Umbelliferae families, as well as on fungal spores, in order to build up energy reserves in the form of body fat to survive the winter. When C. septempunctata emerge from diapause in response to rising temperatures, they feed on the nectar of flowering plants such as Prunus spinosa.

Some species of ants are beneficial to C. septempunctata because they farm aphids. Aphids secrete a sugary honeydew from the terminations of their alimentary canals, which the ants feed on. Ants will also "milk" aphids by stroking them with their antennae. During the winter months, ants gather and store aphid eggs in their nests. In spring, when the aphid eggs have hatched, the ants carry the young aphids to plants where they suck sap from them and secrete honeydew.

=== Predators and parasites ===
Known predators of Coccinella septempunctata are birds, small mammals, spiders and other Coccinellidae. Other insects, such as lacewings, will feed on ladybird eggs. C. septempunctata's fourth larval instar is particularly vulnerable to predation, and many larvae are lost during this stage. But adult C. septempunctata have few enemies in nature due to effective anti-predator adaptations. Their distinctive high contrast black and orange spots and conspicuous colours deter potential predators. The species also has a defense mechanism called reflex bleeding, whereby it emits a foul-tasting alkaloid fluid from its leg joints. When threatened, a ladybird sometimes secretes the foul-tasting substance for protection. The toxic alkaloids that C. septempunctata synthesizes are N-oxide coccinelline and the alkaloid's free base, precoccinelline. The colour of the seven-spot ladybird's elytra and its spots size are an indicator of how toxic it is to predators. The diet and sex of the seven-spot ladybird do not influence the spot size.

Often C. septempunctata become hosts to a number of parasites. Parasitic wasps, in particular Dinocampus coccinellae and Perilitus coccinellae, regularly target the larvae of seven-spot ladybirds. P. coccinellae synchronises its development with C. septempunctata larvae, and even enters and exits diapause in step with its host. D. coccinellae deposits its eggs in body cavities of female C. septempunctata, which hatch and consume the ladybird's eggs. These wasp larvae remain in the host, often in a ladybird's leg, until they pupate and emerge nine days later. It has been reported that some adult C. septempunctata are able to recover from this parasitism and resume their lifecycle.

== Distribution, habitat and status ==
Coccinella septempunctata was first described and named in 1758 by Swedish biologist Carl Linnaeus in the tenth edition of his Systema Naturae. The species has a broad ecological range, and inhabits regions with a temperate climate, abundant vegetation, and concentrations of aphids to feed on. The beetle originated in many areas across the Palearctic realm, and is currently found throughout Europe (including the British Isles and European Russia), most of Asia (including the Middle East, China, Japan, the Koreas, India and Pakistan), and North Africa. The seven-spot ladybird has also been introduced to several areas, including North America (the United States and Canada) and South Africa.

In some areas, especially in Europe, populations of C. septempunctata are in decline due to the proliferation of the harlequin or Asian ladybird (Harmonia axyridis). This invasive species is more disease-resistant than C. septempunctata, outcompetes the native ladybirds for resources, and even preys on them. In the United Kingdom, the Asian ladybeetle first arrived on the English south coast in 2004. It had been introduced to the Netherlands, Belgium and France as a pest control agent, but it began to multiply uncontrollably. The UK Ladybird Survey has been monitoring the harlequin's expansion across England and has reported that it could potentially wipe out the indigenous seven-spot ladybirds.

The seven-spot ladybird has a wide variety of habitats, particularly where large numbers of aphids are present. These include forests, grasslands, agricultural fields, marshes, and suburban parks and gardens. Host plants can include herbaceous plants, crops, and many types of trees and shrubs. They have been found at elevations ranging from sea level to an altitude of 1,500 m (4,900 ft). C. septempunctata adults are active during spring and summer, and become dormant during the colder months. They overwinter or hibernate anywhere they can find shelter, but generally prefer elevated areas like hilltops. Overwintering sites include under tree bark and boulders, in hedgerows, densely packed grass, and leaf litter in parks and gardens as well as at forest edges. Adults emerge from their shelters as ambient temperatures begin to rise; the timing can vary depending on the degree of shelter from the elements that each hibernation site provides.

C. septempunctata's conservation status has not been evaluated, and it does not appear on the IUCN Red List or in any of the CITES databases. It is distributed widely across Europe and Asia, and is regarded as an invasive species in areas where it has been introduced.

== Gallery ==
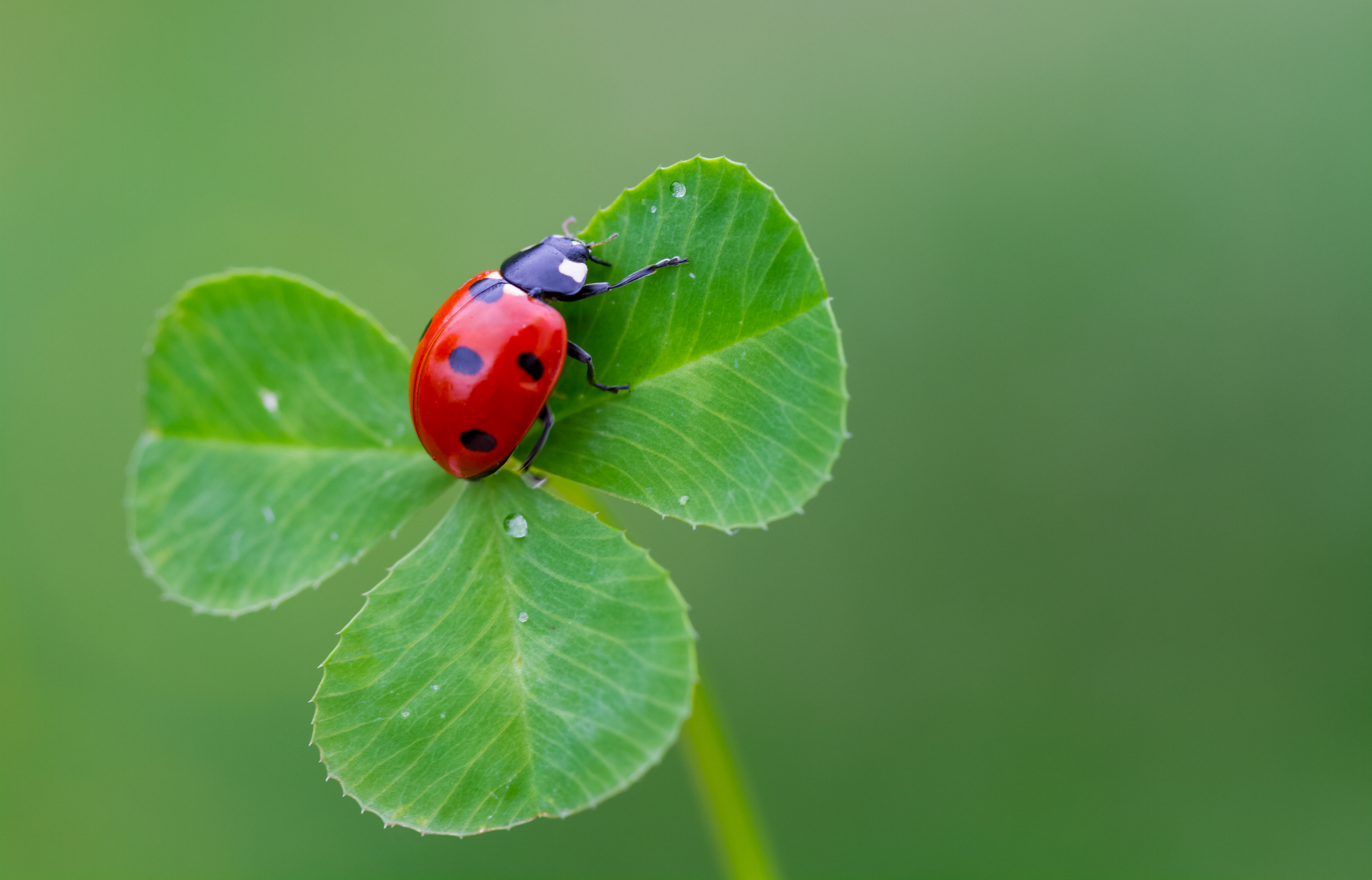
Coccinella septempunctata in Turkey

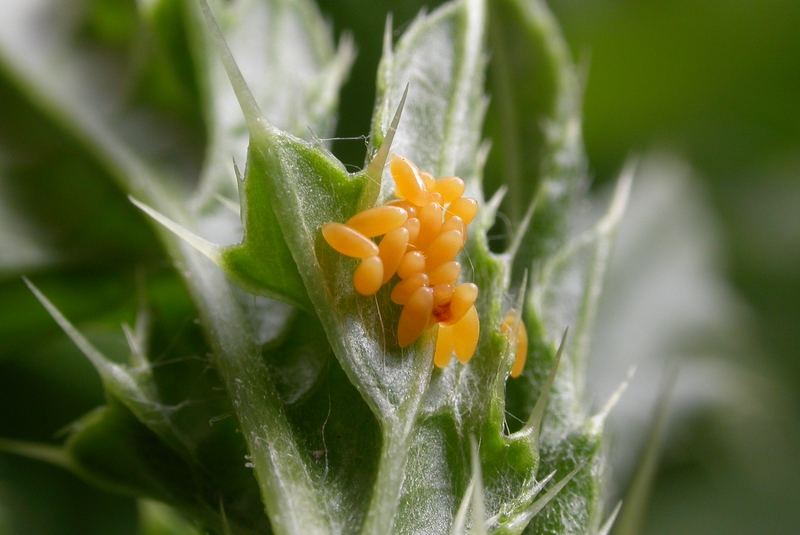
C. septempunctata eggs

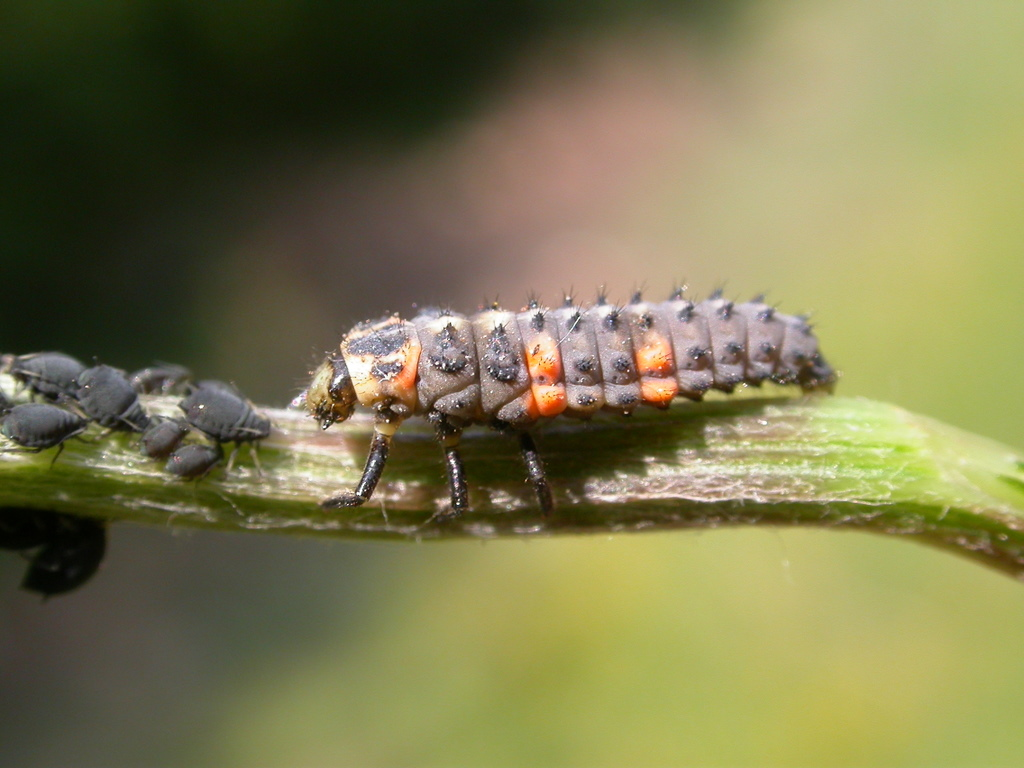
C. septempunctata larva eating aphids in Belgium

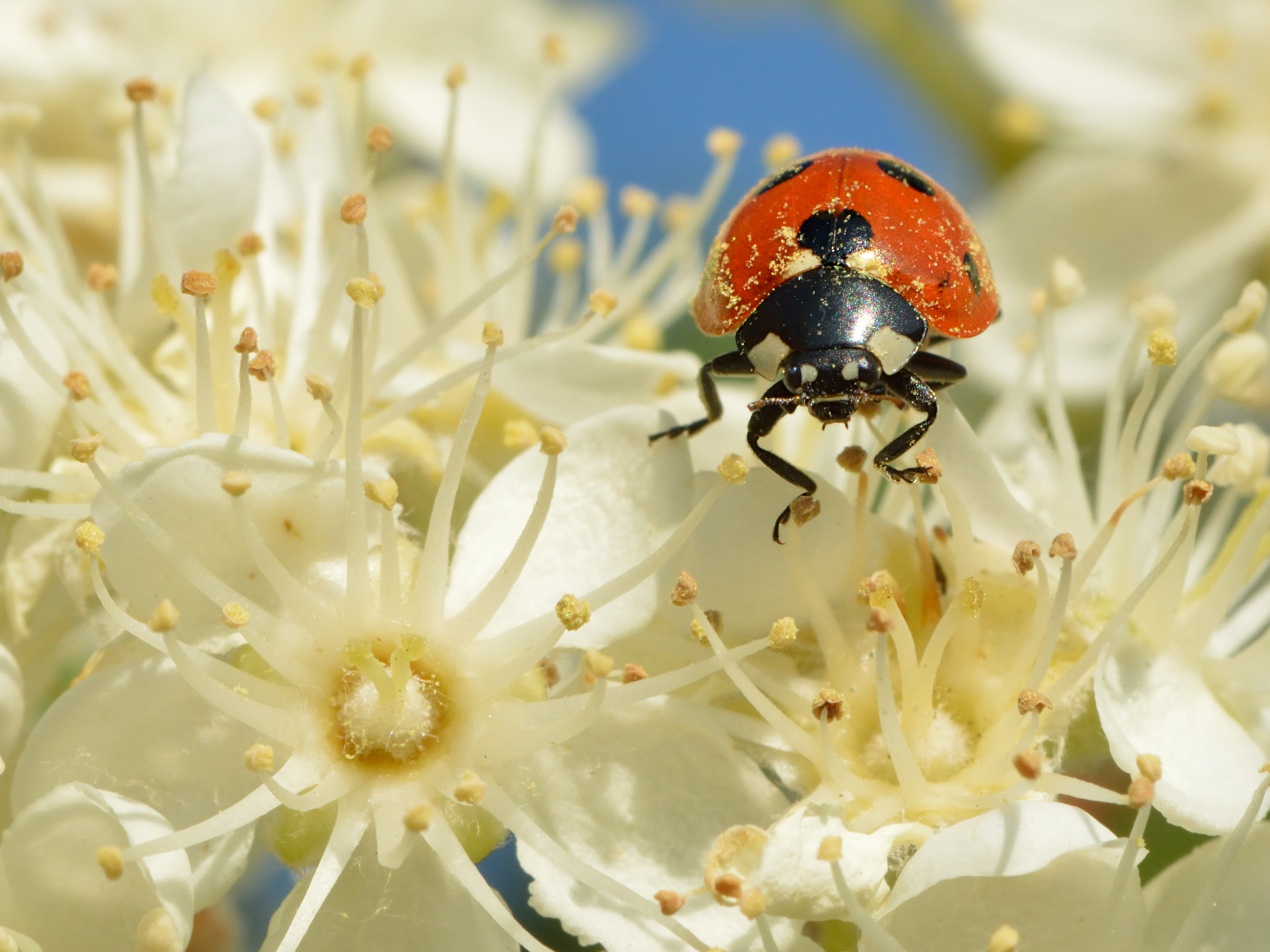
In addition to aphids, seven-spot ladybirds consume pollen and nectar

== Interaction with humans ==
=== Introductions and biological control ===
A number of attempts were made to introduce Coccinella septempunctata to North America between 1956 and 1971 as a biological pest control agent to reduce aphid numbers. The species was not found to have permanently established itself in the United States until June 1973, when a population of them was spotted in New Jersey, apparently having been introduced accidentally via waste from John F. Kennedy International Airport dumped nearby. Since then, the seven-spot ladybird has spread across the entire United States and southern Canada.

C. septempunctata breeding programs have been established around the world to mass-rear seven-spot ladybirds for release on agricultural land to control aphids. The beetles are typically reared on a natural diet of aphids, which also involves having to rear aphids, or on an artificial diet of proteins like rape pollen beetle, honey and shrimp. Using a natural diet is the preferred approach because it generally produces healthier ladybirds with good fecundity, although research into improving artificial diets is ongoing. C. septempunctata breeding normally takes place in controlled environments with regulated temperatures, humidity and light conditions. Problems of ladybirds eating their own eggs and larval instar are overcome by regularly moving egg masses and larvae to separate areas.

The introduction of non-native ladybird species such as C. septempunctata and the harlequin or Asian ladybeetle (Harmonia axyridis) to regions such as North America has led to a sharp decline in many native species, including other Coccinella. These invasive species have outcompeted the native species for resources, and in many instances, they engage in intraguild predation. While beneficial in controlling aphid infestations, the introduction of these non-native species is suspected to have impacted the area's ecosystem health, and the hidden benefits of these displaced native species are lost.

Another negative impact of C. septempunctata and H. axyridis is their increasing presence in vineyards around the world. They sometimes get harvested with the grapes and taint the resulting wine, referred to as a "ladybug taint". The compound released by the ladybirds responsible for this tainting is 2-isopropyl-3-methoxypyrazine, which gives the wine a "green, bell pepper-, and peanut-like aroma and flavor". This contamination has devalued wines from affected regions, and these ladybirds have been labelled "one of the greatest threats to the industry". Several approaches have been adopted to prevent this tainting, including eliminating the beetles from the vineyards, and treating the wine to counteract the invasive alkyl-methoxypyrazines.

=== Population explosions ===
The population of C. septempunctata in England increased dramatically during a heatwave in 1976. The British Entomological and Natural History Society estimated that by late July that year, 23.65 billion seven-spot ladybirds swarmed across the country's eastern and southern coasts. The population explosion occurred because of a warm spring that resulted in an increase in the number of aphids, the ladybirds' main source of food. As the hot weather dried the plants on which the aphids fed, the aphid populations declined, which caused the ladybirds to swarm to try to find food elsewhere. The swarms congregated at the coast because they were unable to cross the sea. Healthy ladybirds can normally fly up to 120 km (75 mi) at an altitude of 1,000 m (3,300 ft), and crossing the English Channel would not have been a problem. But in this instance, they were too exhausted and hungry to travel any further. Locals called 1976 "the year of the ladybird". One holidaymaker recalled that "everywhere one put one's foot, it was thick with ladybirds. The posts along the sea-front holding up the chains were completely smothered." People were also bitten by ladybirds, which the UK Centre for Ecology & Hydrology explained were attempts by the beetles to rehydrate themselves.

The British Entomological and Natural History Society stated that population explosions of the seven-spot ladybird generally happen "about once every 15 years". The weather conditions in 1990 were conducive for another large swarm, but a parasite had destroyed large numbers of ladybird pupae, and no swarm happened. The biggest swarms since 1976 occurred in English coastal towns in July 2025. The "very high numbers" of ladybirds were attributed to the hot weather and the increase in the aphid population. The insects briefly disrupted play at a test cricket match between England and India on 10 July at Lord's. The English vice-captain Ollie Pope called the interruption "a first in sport" and added, "I've never seen that ... That's a first that the crowd have got that today." But numbers of ladybirds seen on this occasion were nowhere near those seen in 1976 due to improved stability of the crops.

=== In culture ===
According to some legends, farmers in the Middle Ages called upon the Virgin Mary to help protect their crops against insects. Red beetles with black spots arrived and ate the destructive insects. Farmers called the beetles "helpers" and "The Beetle of Our Lady", which became "ladybug" and "ladybird". It was believed that the red wings of the beetles represented the red cloak that the Virgin Mary is often seen wearing in paintings, and the seven spots represented the seven joys and sorrows of Mary.

In Malta, the ladybird is believed to have been born when the Virgin Mary pricked her finger with a rose thorn at the crucifixion. A black beetle flew under Mary's finger and turned red when a drop of her blood landed on it. Then seven of Mary's tears washed away some of the blood, leaving behind seven spots on its back. The Maltese originally called ladybirds kola, but changed it to nannakola after a nursery rhyme "Nanna Kola" (Grandmother Kola) became popular in the early 20th century. In Sweden, ladybirds are called nyckelpiga, or "key helper", because it was believed that their seven spots represented the seven virtues, and that they held the keys to unlock the kingdom of heaven for the Virgin Mary. In Spain, ladybirds are called mariquita or marieta, names derived from Maria, the Virgin Mary.

C. septempunctata is designated the national insect of Finland. The seven-spotted ladybug is also the official insect in five states in the United States, namely, Massachusetts, New Hampshire, Delaware, Ohio and Tennessee. New York state has another species of ladybug as their official state insect, the nine-spotted ladybug (C. novemnotata).

C. septempunctata is featured on postage stamps from many countries, including Switzerland, Finland, Malta, Croatia, Algeria, Israel, Iraq, China and India.

== Subspecies ==
Three subspecies of Coccinella septempunctata have been described:

- Coccinella septempunctata septempunctata (Linnaeus, 1758)
- Coccinella septempunctata brucki (Mulsant, 1866)
- Coccinella septempunctata algerica (Kovář, 1977)

C. s. septempunctata is found in Europe, C. s. brucki in Japan, and C. s. algerica in Algeria. C. s. brucki and C. s. algerica were originally considered to be the distinct species, Coccinella brucki and Coccinella algerica respectively, but were later found to be subspecies of C. septempunctata.

== See also ==
- The Year of the Ladybird – a 2013 novel that references the vast numbers of seven-spot ladybirds in England in 1976
