= C13H23N =

The molecular formula C_{13}H_{23}N (molar mass: 193.33 g/mol) may refer to:

- Adapromine
- Precoccinelline
