= St. Arnaud Fire Station =

Heritage listed building in Victoria, Australia

Former St. Arnaud Fire Station
- Location within Australia
- 36.616753°S 143.258501°E
- Location: 12 Napier Street, St. Arnaud, Northern Grampians Shire

Victorian Heritage Register

The St. Arnaud Fire Station in St. Arnaud, Victoria, Australia, is a former fire station which has been registered as a historic place on the Victorian Heritage Register. It has also been known as the Old Fire Station, as Former St. Arnaud Fire Station and as Turcock's Residence.

It was listed by the Heritage Victoria.

It was listed by Northern Grampians Shire with the statement that the station "has significance as an unusual, intact, rural fire station with attached Victorian residence." It was built in 1883 and was operated by the local fire brigade until 1916. It was also deemed architecturally significant for demonstrating "original design qualities of a Victorian style. These qualities include the single storey hipped roof that traverses the site (the residence), together with a gable roof form that projects towards the street frontage (the fire brigade station). Other intact qualities include the originally unpainted brick wall construction, rendered and scored side wall construction, unpainted and lapped galvanised corrugated iron roof cladding, unpainted brick chimney with a corbelled top, narrow eaves, timber framed, double hung and two paned windows, four panelled timber door, arched vertically boarded double doors, timber verandah columns, cast iron verandah valances and brackets, timber flag pole finial, timber bargeboards, three courses of brick voussoirs forming the arched double door opening and the oculus ventilator. The timber picket fence, exotic street tree, standpipe and post box also contribute to the significance of the place."

It was also noted that the station's " locally made bricks illustrate a technological process no longer in practice."

See also on related standpipe).
