= 1955 United Kingdom heatwave =

Set of severe weather events

The 1955 United Kingdom heatwave and associated drought were severe weather events that occurred over all parts of the country. The drought was the seventh worst recorded in Yorkshire and worse than that of the 1976 United Kingdom heat wave. It followed a period of extreme rain, mitigating its effects by water table and reservoir reduction.

July 1955 was a very dry month in the UK. Much of the south and east of England saw little rain; for instance, Bury St Edmunds saw no rain at all in the whole month. However, on 18 July, Martinstown, Dorset saw unusually heavy rain, with 11 inches (280 mm) recorded in the village over a nine-hour period.

The extreme winter of January and February, the summer heatwave followed by very heavy rainfall are amongst the monthly reports chronicled by amateur meteorologist, Trevor Harley.

== See also ==
- Drought in the United Kingdom
