= 1976 British Isles heatwave =

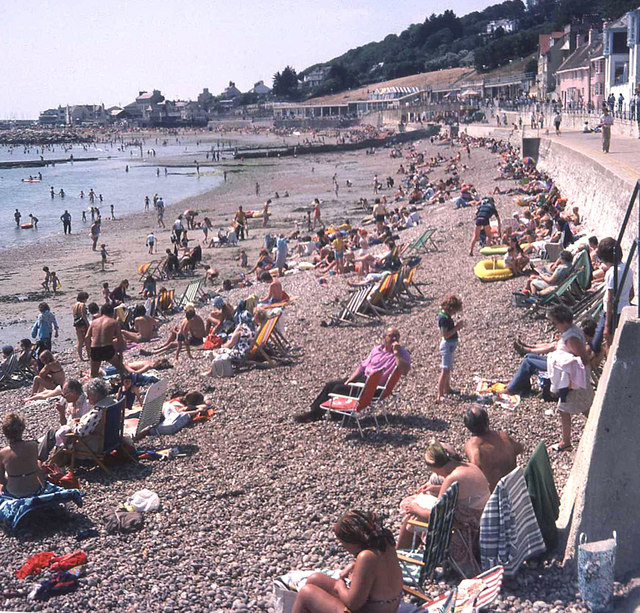
- Lyme Regis Beach, Dorset, August 1976

Meteorological history
- Duration: 23 June 1976 - 27 August 1976
- Heat event
- Max temp: 35.9 °C (96.6 °F), recorded at Cheltenham, Gloucestershire on 3 July 1976

Overall effects
- Areas affected: British Isles

A period of unusually hot summer weather occurred in the British Isles during the summer of 1976. At the same time, there was a severe drought on the islands of Great Britain and Ireland. It was one of the driest, sunniest and warmest summers (June/July/August) in the 20th century, although the summer of 1995 is now regarded as the driest. Only a few places registered more than half their average summer rainfall.

The health effects of the heat contributed to mortality displacement during the year. Wildlife and vegetation effects were also observed. The British government implemented water rationing to mitigate the impact of the drought. Crops were badly hit, with £500 million worth of crops failing and food prices subsequently increased by 12%.

In the Central England temperature record, it was the warmest summer in the series only equalled by 2025. It was the warmest summer in the Aberdeen area since at least 1864, and the driest summer since 1868 in Glasgow. It remains a reference point for unusually hot summers in the country.

== Heatwave and drought effects ==
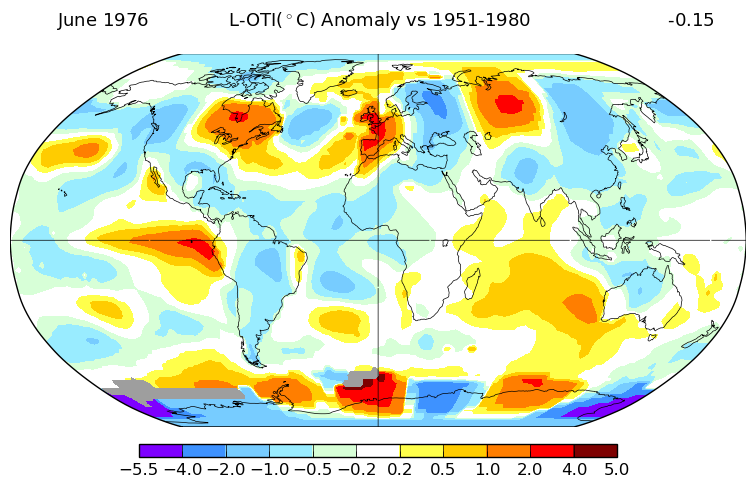
June 1976 GISS Surface Temperature Analysis Global Maps from GHCN v3 Data

Heathrow had 16 consecutive days with daily maxima over 30 °C (86 °F) from 23 June to 8 July and for 15 consecutive days from 23 June to 7 July temperatures reached 32.2 °C (90 °F) somewhere in the United Kingdom. Furthermore, five days saw temperatures exceed 35 °C (95 °F). On 28 June, temperatures reached 35.6 °C (96.1 °F) in Southampton. The hottest day of all was 3 July, with temperatures reaching 35.9 °C (96.6 °F) in Cheltenham.

The great drought was due to a very long dry period. The summer and autumn of 1975 were very dry, and the winter of 1975–76 was exceptionally dry, as was the spring of 1976; indeed, some months during this period had no rain at all in some areas.

The drought was at its most severe in August 1976 and in response Parliament passed the Drought Act 1976 to ration water. Parts of the south west went 45 days without any rain in July and August. As the hot and dry weather continued, devastating heath and forest fires broke out in parts of Southern England. 50,000 trees were destroyed at Hurn Forest in Dorset. Crops were badly hit, with £500 million worth of crops failing. Food prices subsequently increased by 12%.

In the last week of August 1976, days after Denis Howell was appointed Minister for Drought, severe thunderstorms brought rain to some places for the first time in weeks. September and October 1976 were both very wet months, bringing the drought to an end.

The Haweswater Reservoir had only 10% of its water left; people walked dryshod on its bed 60 feet (18 m) below its normal water level. The site of the flooded village of Mardale Green was dry. Ladybower Reservoir in Derbyshire dried out and revealed the flooded villages of Ashopton and Derwent.

In Ireland the temperature reached 32.5 °C (90.5 °F) in County Offaly on 29 June 1976. There were also gorse fires in County Wicklow.

== Health impact ==
The 1976 heatwave is understood to have been the cause of 20% excess deaths and there was a significant increase in hospital emergency admissions from 24 June to 8 July 1976 compared with the same period in 1975 or 1974. This compares to 59% excess deaths for the 2003 heatwave.

== Ecological impact ==
Massive swarms of seven-spotted ladybirds occurred across the country, with the British Entomological and Natural History Society estimating that by late July 23.65 billion of them were swarming across the southern and eastern coasts of England. The population explosion occurred because a warm spring had meant there were many aphids, the ladybirds' prey; as the hot weather dried the plants on which the aphids fed, the aphid populations collapsed, causing the ladybirds to swarm to try to find food elsewhere.

The extensive fires paradoxically helped preserve many areas of heathland that had been becoming scrubland through natural succession because of reduced grazing pressure; the only long-term effect of the fires on Dorset heathlands was a change in the composition of scrub. The impacts of the extended drought on mature trees, especially beech, were still evident in UK woodlands in 2013.

== Government response ==
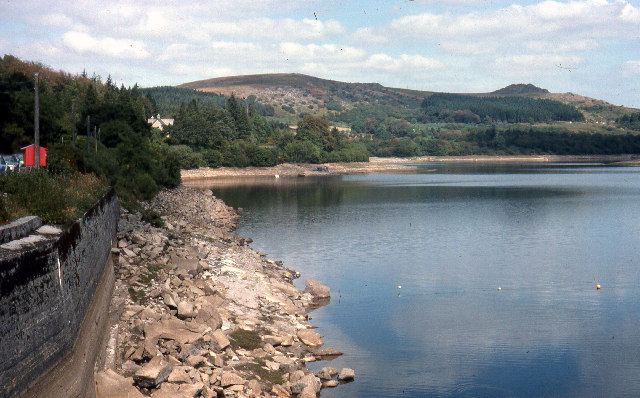
Burrator Reservoir in Devon, July 1976. Many reservoirs, like this one, were at a very low level.

The effect of the heatwave on domestic water supplies led to the passing of a Drought Act by Parliament and Minister for Drought, Denis Howell, was appointed. There was some water rationing and public standpipes in some affected areas. Reservoirs were at an extremely low level, as were some rivers. The rivers Don, Sheaf, Shire Brook and Meers Brook (all in Sheffield) all ran completely dry, as well as Frecheville Pond and Carterhall Pond.

Longer term, the UK Department of the Environment realised it needed more information about the storage capacity and other properties of British aquifers, as sources of groundwater.

== Comparisons ==
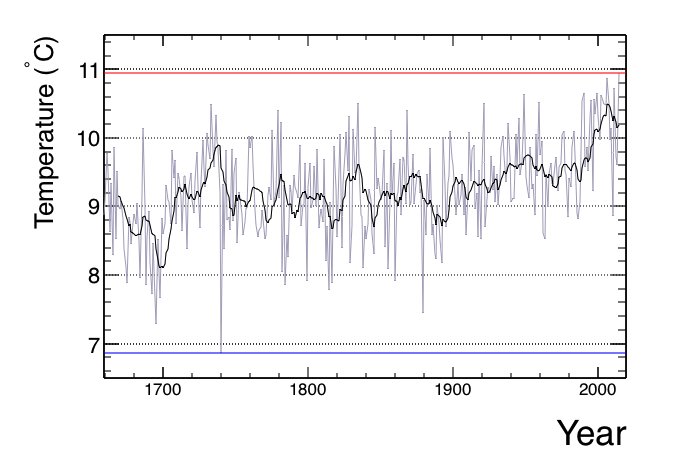
Graph showing Central England temperature dataset, 1659 to 2014

The highest temperature during the 1976 heatwave was 35.9 °C (96.6 °F), 0.8 °C below the record at the time of 36.7 °C (98.1 °F) set on 9 August 1911. As of 2022, 1976 has the 13th hottest day in UK history. In the Central England Temperature series, 1976 is the second hottest summer for more than 350 years after 2025. The average temperature over the whole summer (June, July, August) was 17.77 °C (63.99 °F), compared to the average for the unusually warm years between 2001 and 2008 of 16.30 °C (61.34 °F). As of 2025, the hottest years in the series are 2003, 2006, 2014 and 2022.

The summer became embedded in the national psyche, with subsequent heatwaves in later years, such as 1995, 1997, 2003, 2006, 2022, and 2026 all using 1976 as a benchmark. The 1976 heatwave was a rarity within its decade. Heatwaves in the UK and worldwide have since become more frequent and intense due to climate change.

== In popular culture ==
- The heatwave is mentioned in the 2014 song "Hollow Ponds" by English singer Damon Albarn.
- "Where were you in '76, the long hot summer? You wanna be a rebel, Then turn your hosepipes on." is a lyric in the title track of Born in the U.K., a 2006 album by English musician Badly Drawn Boy.

== See also ==
- Drought in the United Kingdom
- 1976 European heatwave
- 1955 United Kingdom heatwave

== Bibliography ==
- The Great Drought of 1976. Evelyn Cox (1978). Hutchinson, Readers Union Group, ISBN 978-0091332006
