= Drought in the United Kingdom =

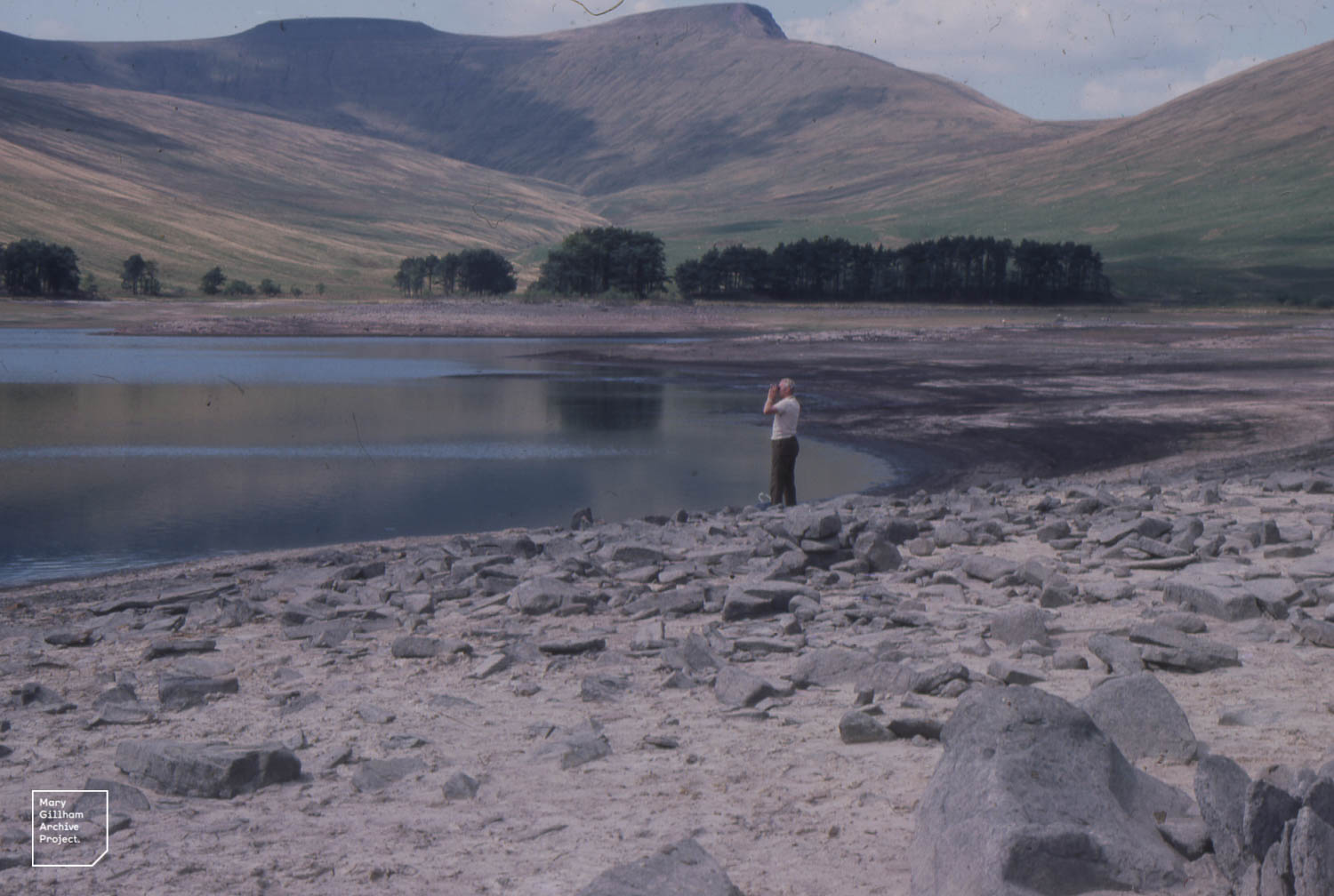
Low water in Upper Neuadd Reservoir in the intense drought of 1976

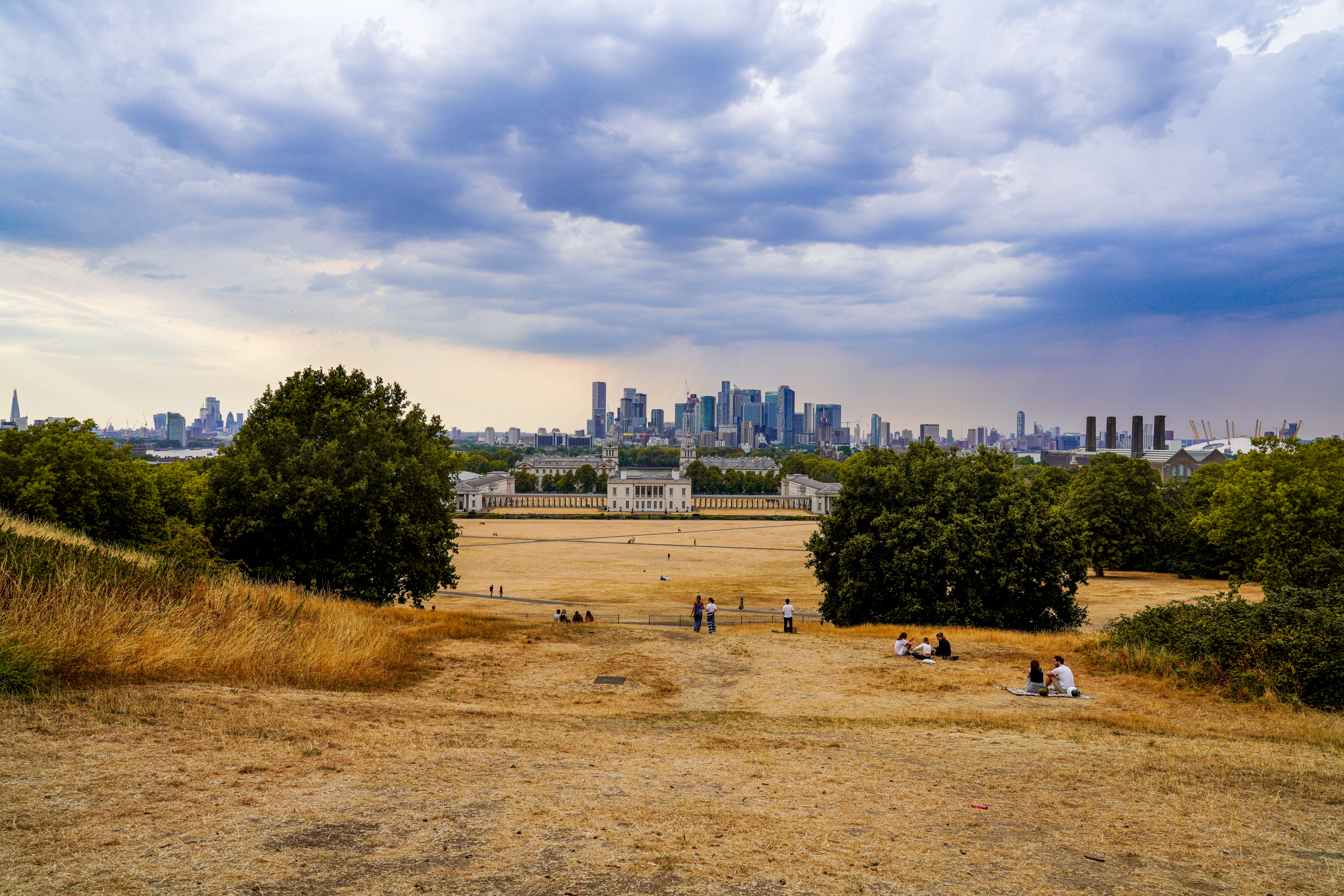
Greenwich Park, London, at the end of the August 2022 drought

Droughts are a relatively common feature of the weather in the United Kingdom, with one around every 5–10 years on average. These droughts are usually during the summer, when a blocking high causes hot, dry weather for an extended period.

Droughts cause issues across sectors, with impacts extending to ecosystems, agriculture and the wider economy in cases of severe drought. The south east of the country usually suffers most, as it has the highest population (and therefore demand) and the lowest average precipitation per year. Even in these areas in severe droughts, the definition, impacts, effects and management are all small in comparison to drought-prone areas such as Australia and parts of the United States. Droughts have continued to occur in recent times, with spring 2011, July 2013, summer 2018, spring 2020, spring and summer 2022 and May and June 2023 all featuring excessively dry periods for part or all of the UK. Most recently, spring 2025 was historically dry and warm, and after a historically hot June that again saw below average rainfall for much of England, North West England and Yorkshire are officially in a state of drought.

Climate change in the UK may lead to an increase in drought frequency, as higher temperatures increase evaporation levels. Dry soils also tend to heat up faster, leading to additional evaporation. Summers are expected to become drier in the south of England, and it is expected that rainfall will happen more in bursts, with longer dry periods between more heavy rainfall.

== Definition and comparison with other countries ==
A drought is a period where there is a shortfall of water after a period of low rainfall. In an environmental drought, there are very low groundwater levels, not enough moisture in the soil, and less water in rivers. An agricultural drought occurs when there is insufficient water for crops and irrigation. These two types of drought often occur simultaneously. A water supply drought occurs when there are concerns that there may not be enough water for customers of water companies.

In the United Kingdom an absolute drought is currently defined "as a period of at least 15 consecutive days when there is less than 0.2 mm (0.008 inches) of rainfall", although before the 1990s a drought was defined as "15 consecutive days with less than 0.25 mm (0.01 inches) rain on any one day". This previous definition sometimes led to confusion, as many argued, "if less than 0.25 mm of rain each day fell in 30 days, is that 2 droughts? And if 0.26 mm fell after 25 days, is the drought over?".

Compared to other countries, the United Kingdom definition of a drought is much less severe. In Libya in the Sahel region, a drought is usually only recognized after two years without any measurable rainfall. If this were to happen in the United Kingdom, the consequences would be disastrous.

In the case of a hydrological or agricultural drought, there can be moisture in the soil, but little is getting to vegetation, either because it is frozen (which can occur in severely cold winters in the United Kingdom) or because of very high temperatures which mean that the rate of evapotranspiration exceeds the rate of uptake of water from the plant (which can be seen in the United Kingdom, on hot days, when plants wilt as their stores of water are depleted).

A hydrological drought can occur after a relatively dry winter, when the soil moisture storage, reservoirs and water table have not risen enough to counteract the warm summer weather. These sorts of conditions can persist over several years, even with above average rainfall, as the rainfall only slowly percolates through the water stores and replenishes them.

== Causes ==
The main cause for a long spell of dry weather in the United Kingdom is usually a blocking anticyclone (often the Azores High) system that forces other low-pressure systems around it, usually to the northwest. This can happen any time of year, but brings hot sunny weather in summer and dry, cold and foggy weather in winter. This is why in dry spells, the northwest of the United Kingdom actually often receives above average rainfall, as depressions and associated fronts are pushed towards the north.

A severe drought in the United Kingdom needs to have the high pressure in charge of the weather for an extended period, commonly for weeks or even months at a time. Most often sea surface temperature anomalies in the Atlantic and intensification of the mid latitude westerlies in the Pacific can bring a stable anticyclone, meaning that the pressure can remain above average for weeks, or even months at a time, allowing the heat to build and dry weather to continue during the anticyclonic system.

As of March 2019, according to the Environment Agency, due to the impact of climate change, England's anticipated demand for water will exceed its supply around the year 2045. Leaks in water supply lose water and investment in plugging leaks is needed. Tom Bradshaw of the National Farmers’ Union called for increased investment in water irrigation, reservoirs on farms and an improved plan to manage water resources. Martin Baxter of the Institute of Environmental Management and Assessment said, "What we are seeing now is that climate impacts in terms of more extreme weather events are happening more frequently and at a greater magnitude than was anticipated. We have really got to become more resilient to what we know is on the way."

== Notable events ==
Several notable droughts in the United Kingdom have occurred in recorded history, some of these in the 21st century. They can be divided into two categories, the meteorological drought where little or no rain fell over a relatively short period and the hydrological drought, where below average rainfall has occurred over an extended period.

=== Meteorological droughts ===
==== 1976 drought ====
One of the most severe meteorological droughts in recent times was in 1976, when a dry 1975 winter was followed by one of the hottest and driest summers since records began; the 1976 drought's worst precedent took place 250 years prior.

With low temperatures and therefore low evaporation rates during the winter, the below average rainfall did not present an immediate problem. As the dry winter ended and was followed by the hot and particularly dry summer of 1976, the drought became one of the most famous in United Kingdom history.

The drought became a serious problem in late spring. In April, no rain fell in parts of Cornwall; and then in June, no rain fell over Devon and Kent. In August no precipitation was measured in North Wales. This meant that in some places, less than half the average rainfall was measured from October 1975 to August 1976. For example, in Kew, just 235 mm (9.25 inches) of rain was measured over that period, which was 43% of the average, meaning the amount of rainfall was comparable to a semi-arid climate. In Devon and Dorset, some locations received no rainfall for 45 consecutive days through July and August, another United Kingdom record. This was on top of another three periods of absolute drought, totalling 58 days with no measurable precipitation.

The lack of rain can be attributed to the high-pressure system over the United Kingdom at the time, which meant average pressure was 5 millibars (⅐ inHg) above the expected for the summer months.

This drought was intensified by the exceptional heat that continued through it. Records were set for the heat as well as the lack of rain, resulting in very high evaporation rates. From 23 June, temperatures were over 32 °C (90 °F) for two consecutive weeks around the United Kingdom, peaking at 35.6 °C (96.1 °F) on 28 June at Mayflower Park in Southampton. The highest temperature in the summer was 35.9 °C (96.6 °F) at Cheltenham on 3 July. The effects of the drought included substantial and long-lasting changes to the tree composition of forests. The European beech was severely affected by the drought and took around twenty years to recover. To date, its growth has failed to recover completely, reaching only about 75% of their pre-drought growth rates, even decades after the drought. Additionally, death due to drought resulted in the loss of around 15% of the mature beech trees in the forest. In contrast, the sessile oak did not suffer any death or growth suppression due to drought, but instead benefited from reduced competition with beech. Sessile oak growth increased suddenly after the drought and remained unusually high until the 1990s, when beech recovered and regained dominance. European beech dominates temperate forests over large areas of Europe, but is considered to be particularly drought-sensitive and is predicted to be outcompeted by more drought-tolerant species in many regions as the climate warms.

==== 2003 drought ====
The 2003 drought saw a long period of low rainfall, but the overall impacts were quite moderate compared to 1976. This was also notable for the temperatures, with 100 °F (38 °C) being hit in the United Kingdom for the first time since records began, with a top temperature of 38.5 °C (101.3 °F) recorded in Faversham, Kent, and some places recording up to, or above, 40 °C (104 °F) unofficially. This drought and the associated heat wave affected the whole of Europe, not just the United Kingdom, as with the 1976 event. The average temperature was the highest since 1868, measured over February to September. This added to the severity of the drought, with high rates of evaporation. The summer ranked as the 4th highest for potential evaporation since 1961, and this evaporation alone exceeded rainfall totals across a third of the United Kingdom.

The United Kingdom had its driest February to October period since 1921. Over the whole of the United Kingdom, the rainfall totals were the 3rd lowest since records began in 1900, and in some regions only 25% of the average rainfall fell in this period. Scotland suffered during this period as it had its driest spell since the 1955 drought, and coupled with a dry winter here (England and Wales had relatively wet winters as depressions were forced south) this led to a hydrological drought here too. Also, with several local convective thunderstorms missing specific areas, some localities had exceptionally low rainfall totals, compared to the average, with some places having their driest February to October since 1697. The drought ended in October when a low-pressure system finally arrived to bring substantial rain to the United Kingdom. Some areas in Southern England had more rain in this 6-day period than they had received in the previous 3 months. Fortunately the preceding winter of 2002–2003 was relatively wet, which reduced the severity of the drought greatly, unlike the dry 1975–76 winter which led into 1976.

==== 2026 drought ====
The following descibes the situation in England, leaving out the rest of the UK (Wales, Scotland, Northern Ireland).

The 2026 drought saw a rapid escalation into a severe meteorological and hydrological drought following an extraordinarily dry and hot summer. Although high winter rainfall across late 2025 and early 2026 had initially replenished water storage levels, conditions changed abruptly in June as persistent high-pressure systems settled over the country, triggering four consecutive heatwaves across July and August.

The drought was driven by extreme rainfall deficits during midsummer. Nationally, July 2026 recorded just 7% of its long-term average rainfall, dropping to less than 1% across parts of southern and eastern England. Absolute drought conditions were recorded across large swathes of the country, with locations in Devon and Hampshire recording 50 and 49 consecutive days without measurable precipitation, respectively. Extreme summer heat exacerbated the lack of rainfall, with high rates of evapotranspiration depleting soil moisture and accelerating a "flash drought" effect. High temperature records were broken, including a new national June record of 38.0C (100.0F).

On 29 July 2026, the Environment Agency (EA) officially declared drought status across seven of its fourteen operational regions, encompassing more than half of England's land area. Unlike the 2003 drought, where a wet preceding winter mitigated the impact on long-term water supplies, the rapid drying out of river basins in 2026 caused severe hydrological stress. By late July, river flows in 78% of English rivers had fallen below normal levels, with one-sixth classed as exceptionally low. Key reservoirs saw capacity fall rapidly, with national storage reaching 75.3%. In response, seven water companies introduced Temporary Use Bans (hosepipe bans) affecting around 23 million customers.

=== Hydrological droughts ===
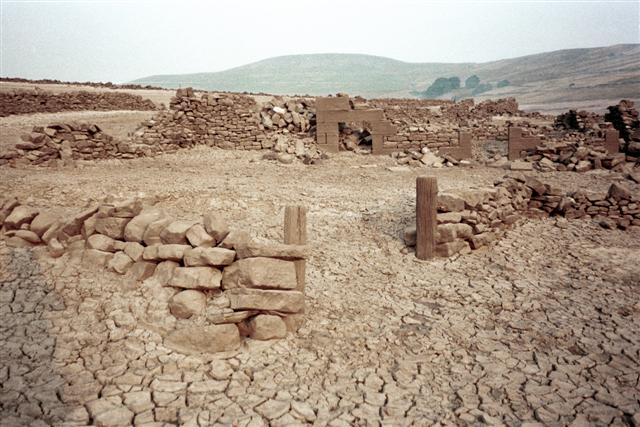
Ruined buildings on the bed of Scar House Reservoir, revealed during the drought of August 1995

A significant hydrological drought occurred in the United Kingdom between 1995 and 1998, when the warm, dry summers were followed by dry, cool winters. This meant that over the three years, the lack of winter precipitation failed to counteract the dry summers, so slowly the water table fell, and reservoir water levels began to fall. Water levels were only replenished after some exceptionally wet years from 1999 to 2002. Similar conditions were felt between 2003 and 2006, with only the record breaking rainfall of 2007 and 2008 replenishing the water levels.

Between 2010 and 2012, England recorded its driest 18-month period in 100 years. Around 20 million people were subject to bans to use water for things like hosepipes. The drought stopped swiftly in the summer of 2012, with the wettest April to September ever recorded. Both events strongly impacted agriculture.

In 2022, there was very low rainfall between March and August, leading to drought over much of the UK. This summer saw temperatures exceed 40°C (104°F), and was the warmest on record. Nationally, water levels were down to 49% of capacity towards the end of summer. There were fish kills, incidents with low flow on rivers, and algal blooms. Cornwall and Devon continued to experience drought into late 2023.

In 2025, most of England experienced persistently dry and warm conditions that have led to low water levels. Spring 2025 was the sixth-driest on record in a nationwide series dating back to 1836, and June was the second-hottest on record in a nationwide series dating back to 1884. Along with this, England again widely saw below average levels of rainfall over the hot June. Alongside ongoing infrastructural issues, the very dry and warm weather led to notably low river flows and reservoir levels in several areas, with Northern and Eastern England and Scotland being particularly badly affected. As of early July 2025, some rivers were flowing at levels as low as previous drought years, including 1976. Satellite imagery showed a significant drying out of flora comparable to July 2022 in Eastern and Central England. Further heatwaves and persistently dry weather forecast over July threatened to exacerbate current dry conditions into a much more widespread drought. Due to the relentlessly dry and warm weather since March, the 2025 United Kingdom wildfires season was already the worst since official records began in 2012 by April.

== Impact ==
United Kingdom droughts have similar consequences to other droughts elsewhere in the world. The first of these is river and reservoir levels begin to drop as rainfall fails to counteract evaporation.

As drought conditions continue, groundwater levels drop and this provides excellent conditions for fires to develop. With hot, dry weather and no moisture underground, trees lose moisture and become very flammable in dry conditions. This leads to wildfires which usually is the main impact of drought in the United Kingdom, with moorland vegetation such as heather badly affected as the peat bogs dry out. Also, these fires can continue, even when seemingly put out, as the smoldering peat re-ignites the dry vegetation. However, during severe droughts, many trees can burn, and people's lives can be at risk, as in the 1976 drought when a fire encroached on a hospital, and only a wind direction change saved the patients' lives. As embers can be transported easily, and if drought is severe enough, fires can start miles away from their original position as they are transported by wind and even dust devils. With these situations, roads are often closed to prevent loss of life and further damage. These fires also can destroy wildlife habitats, and this can also threaten wildlife.

Often, in severe droughts, crops can fail as the soil does not contain sufficient moisture to keep them alive and this is usually the largest economic impact with £500 million ($830 million) worth of damage from failed crops in 1976. Another, more subtle impact is the insurance claims from damage to houses and businesses from fire and subsidence (caused by the dry and shrunken soil), sometimes amounting to over £50 million ($83 million) in severe droughts.

== Responses and management ==
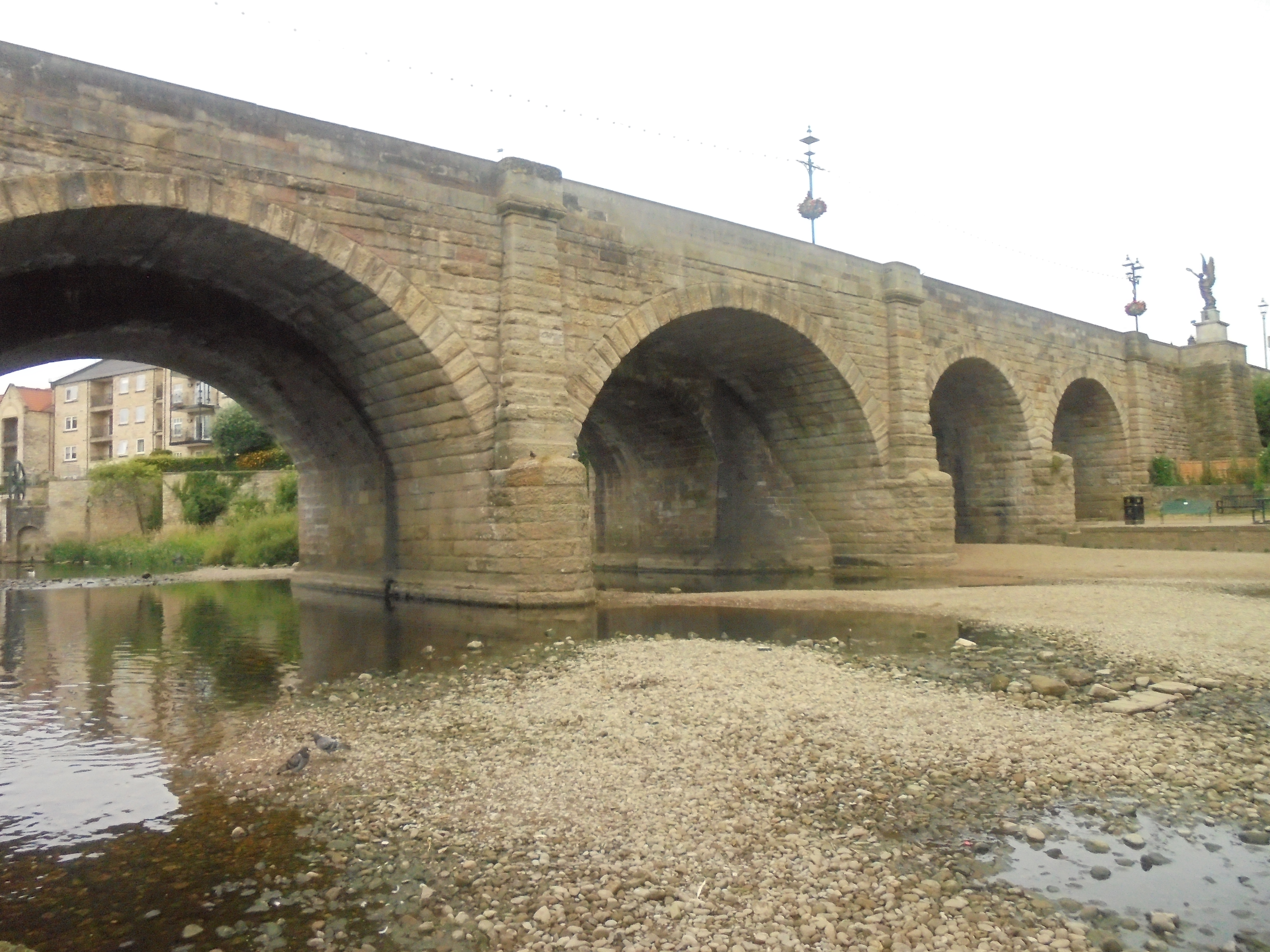
Wetherby Bridge over a dried up River Wharfe, July 2018

The responses to drought in England are managed by the Environment Agency. There are four stages to drought management, applying to both businesses and homes.

The first of these is a media campaign, urging people to save water and thus avoid the need to take specific measures. For example, use a water butt to collect any rainfall.

If drought continues, and water levels continue to decrease, further measures are brought in to save water. This includes a hosepipe ban, which forbids the use of hosepipes, and can be applied to hot tubs, pressure washers and other similar devices in a future drought. These measures were brought in, particularly the ban on hosepipes, in 1976 and 2006.

The third stage involves conserving any non-essential supplies of water. These measures are brought in when no precipitation is forecast and water supplies are already very low. The options include:

- widening the hosepipe bans, to include sprinklers,
- drastic measures such as banning cleaning of buildings, vehicles and windows or the filling of swimming pools.

These measures were also brought in during the 1976 drought.

The fourth and final stage involves drastic measures of water rationing to all businesses and homes in the United Kingdom in an emergency drought order. The measures are brought in only in exceptional conditions of extended periods with little or no rainfall. This means no water supplies at certain times of the day, or allowing water for a specific amount of time. Standpipes and water tankers can be used as a last resort to have only set amounts of water given to each household in a neighbourhood. Again, these measures were used during the 1976 drought.

Also, each area in the United Kingdom has its own drought plan, for the event of any future drought.

== Forecasted events ==
As of March 2019, according to the Environment Agency, due to projected population growth and the impact of climate change, England's anticipated demand for water will exceed its supply around the year 2045.

Climate change in the UK may lead to an increase in drought frequency, as higher temperatures increase evaporation levels. Dry soils also tend to heat up faster, leading to additional evaporation. Summers are expected to become drier in the south of England, and it is expected that rainfall will happen more in bursts, with longer dry periods between more heavy rainfall.

== See also ==
- Sahel drought
- 2003 European heat wave
- 1976 British Isles heat wave
- 2006 European heat wave
- 2022 European drought
- 2023 European drought
