= 1976 European heatwave =

Weather event in Western Europe

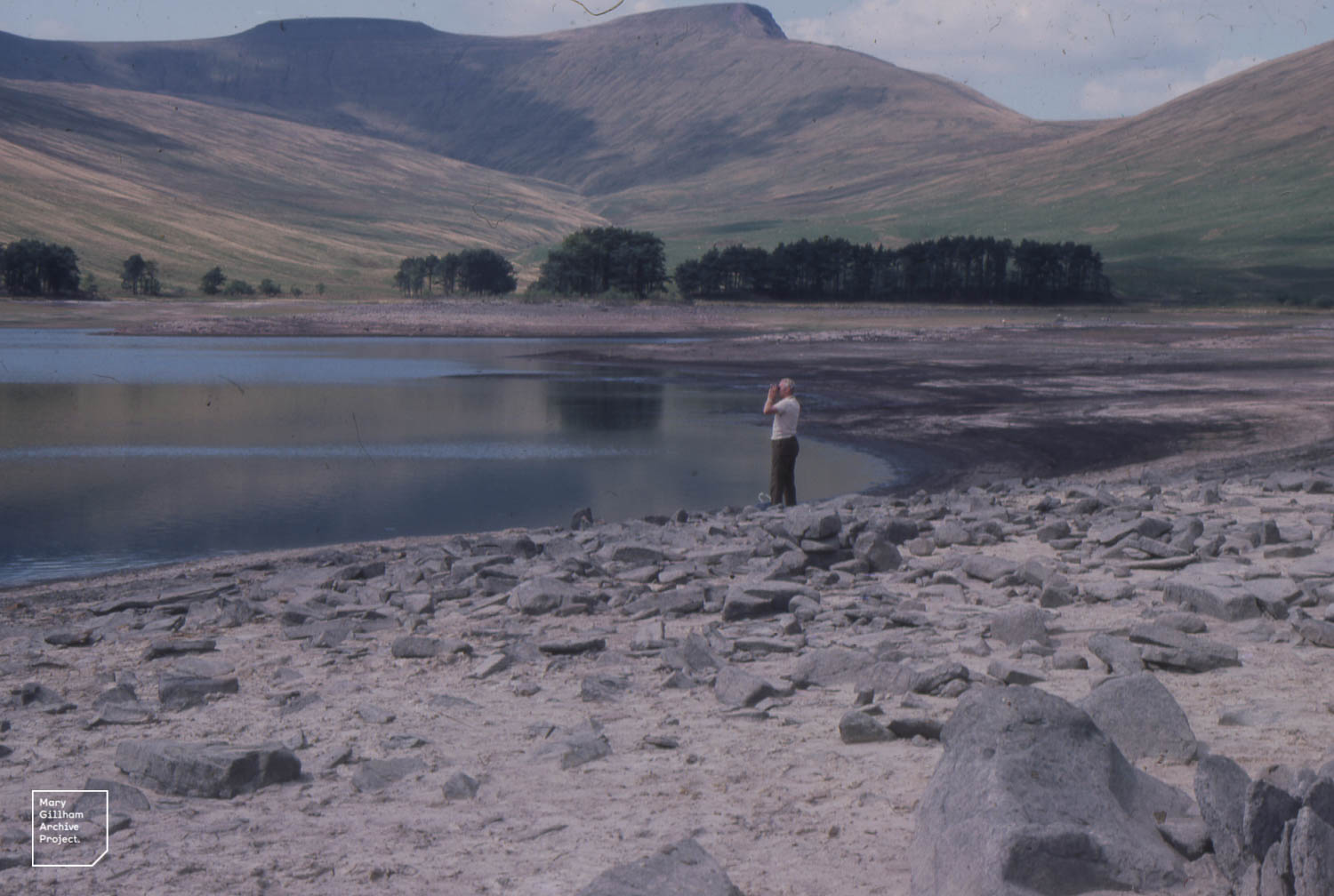
Low water in Upper Neuadd Reservoir, Wales in the drought of 1976.

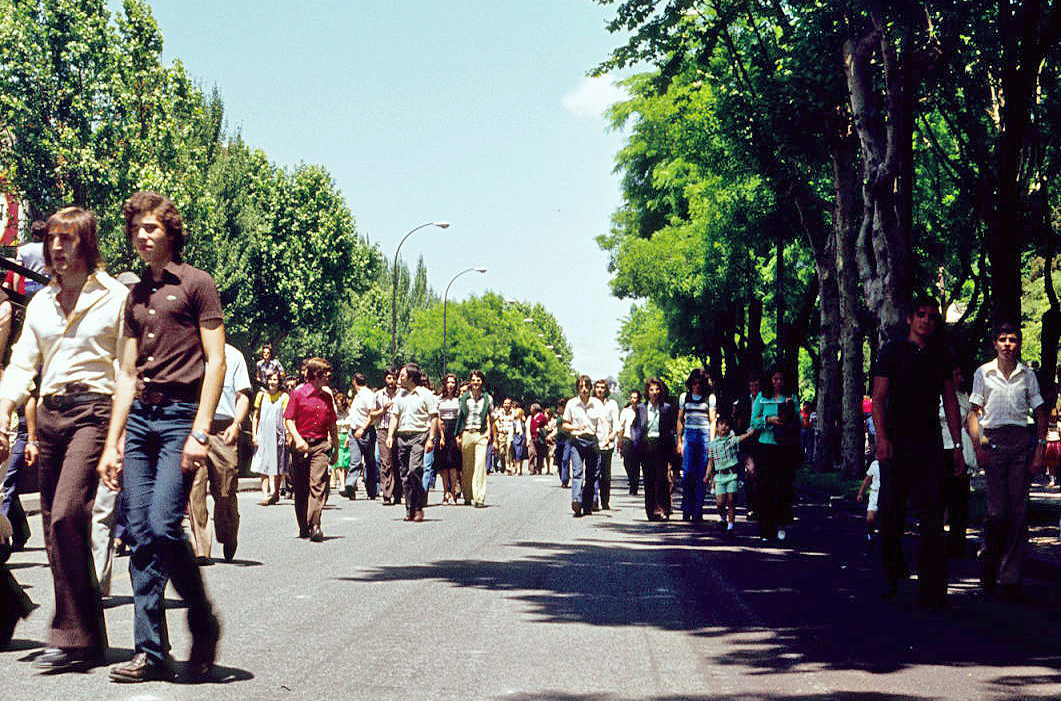
People on Paseo del Prado, Madrid in June 1976.

The 1976 European heatwave was considered to be the hottest summer in Europe, and especially the United Kingdom, during the 20th century. A large high-pressure area dominated most of Europe for all of the summer months. The pressure system moved into place in late May 1976 and remained until the first traces of rain were recorded on 27 August. Rainfall throughout the July–August period was down by half the annual average. During this spell of hot weather temperatures exceeded 32 °C (89.6 °F) at several weather stations within the United Kingdom every day and the town of Cheltenham had eleven, including seven successive days from 1 July - recording 35.9 °C (96.6 °F) on 3 July.

For the entire period much of Europe was bathed in continual sunshine with the United Kingdom seeing an average of more than 14 hours of sunshine per day. 1976 was dubbed "the year of the ladybird" in that country due to the rise in the mass numbers of the insect brought on by the long hot period. In the United Kingdom, the summer coincided with a 16-week dry spell, the longest recorded over England and Wales since 1727.

The summer of 1976 is by now an established reference point for discussion in the UK of contemporary hot spells.

== See also ==
- 1976 British Isles heatwave
- The Year of the Ladybird – a novel by Graham Joyce
