= Precoccinelline =

Names
- IUPAC name (1R,5S)-3-methyl-13-azatricyclo[7.3.1.05,13]tridecane
- Other names Precoccinelline; Alkaloid 193C; 38211-56-2; (3abeta,6abeta,9abeta)-Dodecahydro-2alpha-methylpyrido[2,1,6-de]quinolizine; Pyrido(2,1,6-de)quinolizine, dodecahydro-2-methyl-, (2alpha,3abeta,6aalpha,9abeta)-

Identifiers
CAS Number	38211-56-2
3D model (JSmol)	Interactive image
ChemSpider	157944
PubChem CID	181570
- InChI: InChI=1S/C12H23N/c1-10-8-12-6-2-4-11-5-3-7-13(9-10)14(11)12/h10-13H,2-9H2,1H3/t10?,11?,12-,13+ Key: MOQNYBQLQBMEKL-BPNZPQAUSA-N
- SMILES: CC1C[C@H]2CCCC3N2[C@H](C1)CCC3

Properties
Chemical formula	C_{13}H_{23}N
Molar mass	193.334 g·mol^{−1}
- Except where otherwise noted, data are given for materials in their standard state (at 25 °C [77 °F], 100 kPa). Infobox references

Precoccinelline is an alkaloid produced by the Coccinella septempunctata, also known as the seven-spot ladybird. The alkaloid is released from the joints in C. septempunctata legs when it is provoked to deter predators such as ants or birds. It binds to both insect and mammalian nicotinic acetylcholine receptors, giving it use as an insecticide or as a therapy to treat drug dependence.

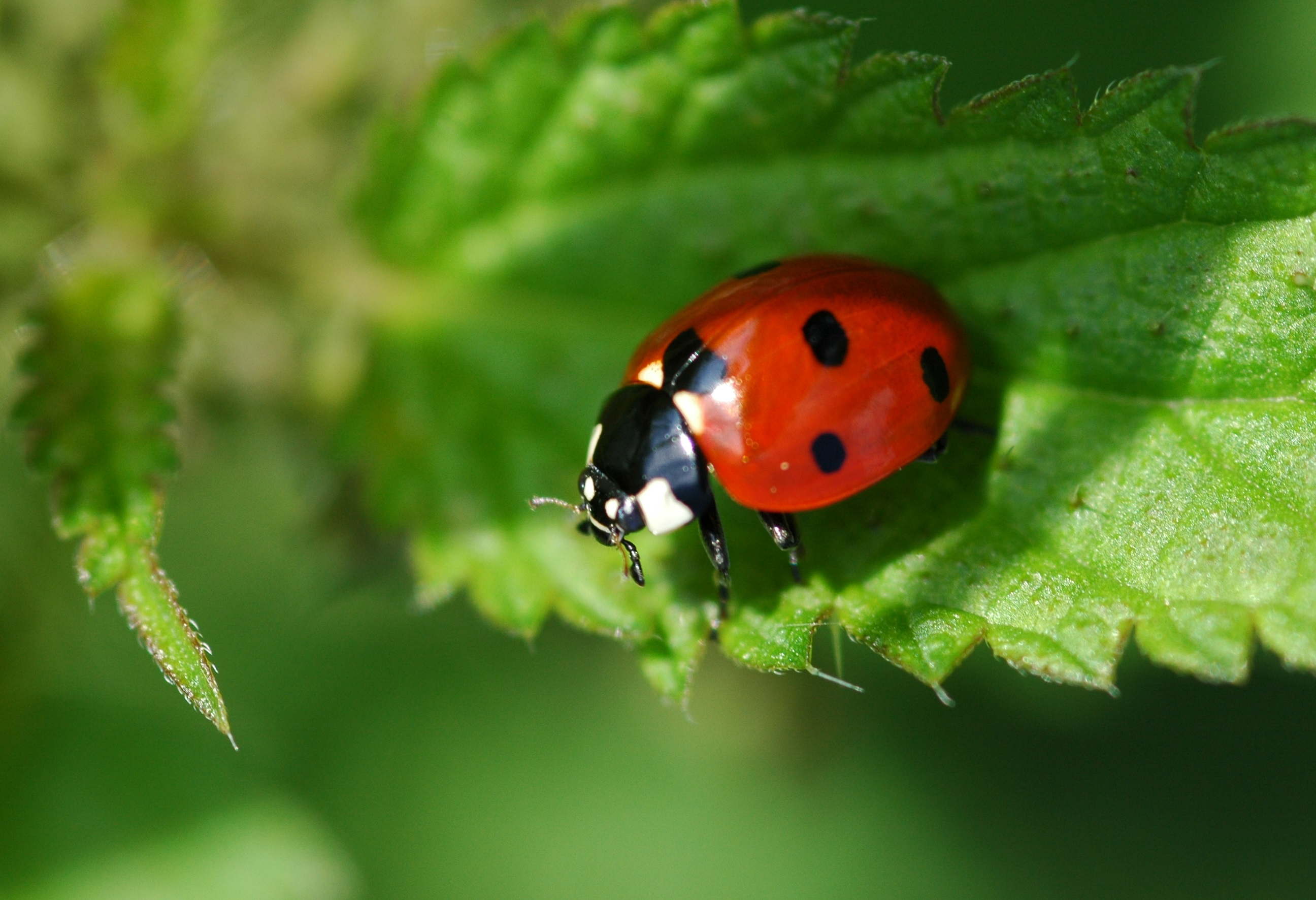
C. septempunctata

== Biosynthesis ==
It was determined that precoccinelline is produced de novo in the C. septempunctata as their diet, which is composed of aphids, does not contain this alkaloid. While the exact biosynthesis has not been fleshed out, precoccinelline is thought to be of polyketide origin. The hypothesized biosynthesis involves condensation of six acetates and methyl addition.

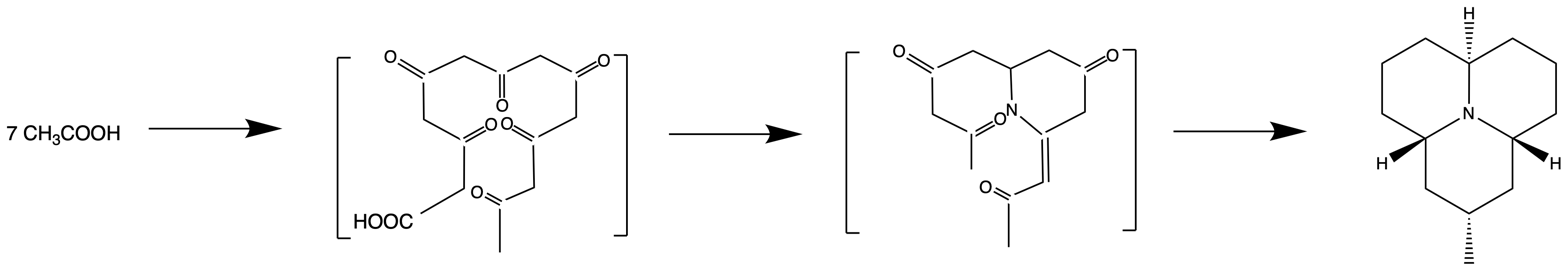
Hypothesized precoccinelline biosynthesis

== Chemical synthesis ==
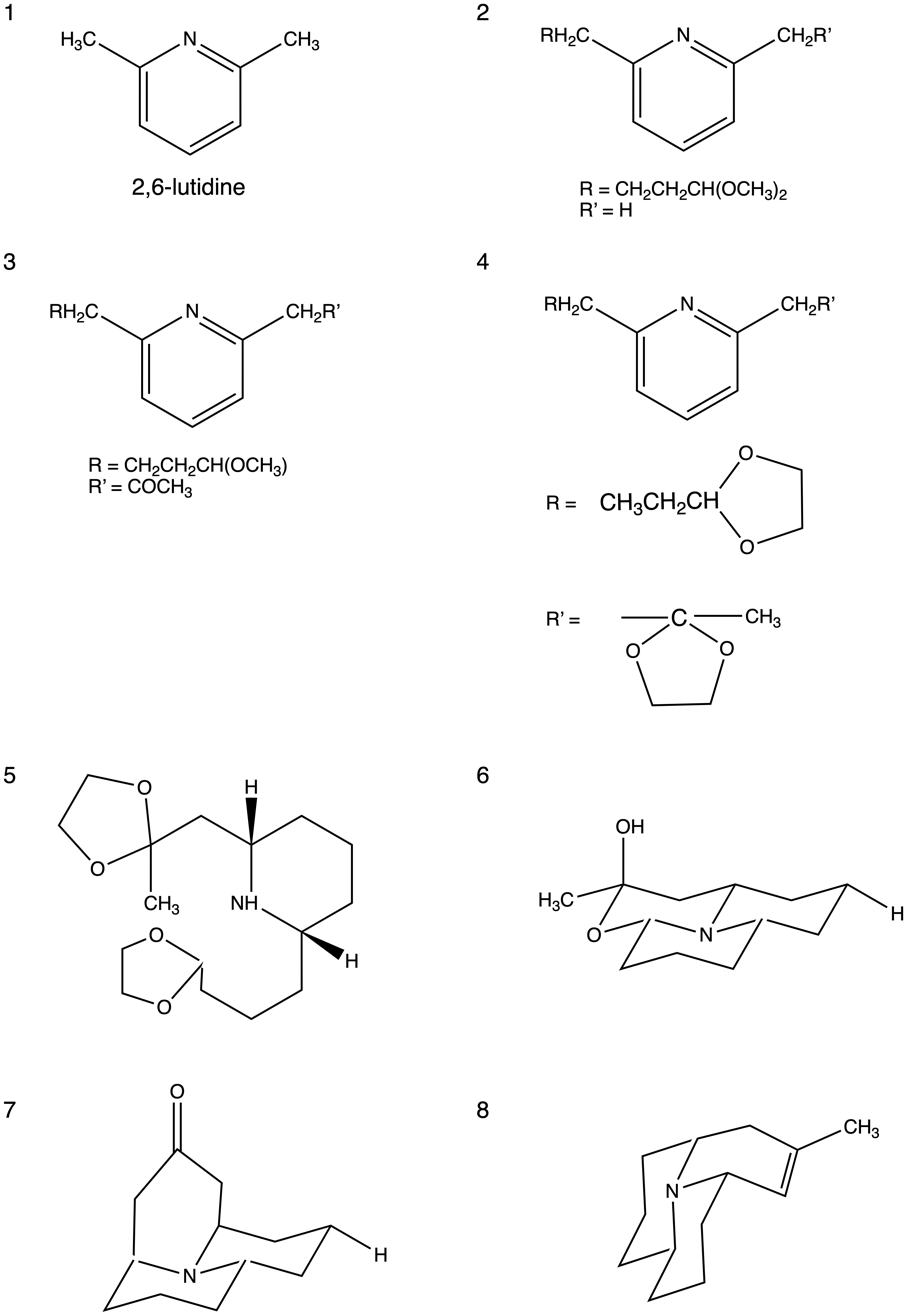
Chemical synthesis of precoccinelline

2,6-lutidine (1) is used as starting material, and its treatment with β-bromo-propionaldehyde dimethyl acetal in ether produces a monolithium derivative. In the presence of 2,6-lutidine in excess, the monolithium derivative becomes an acetal (2). Treatment of the acetal with phenyl-lithium and then adding an ethereal solution of acetonitrile produces the crude ketone (3), followed by immediate transformation into the diacetal (4). Using sodium-isoamyl alcohol, the diacetal can be reduced to give the cis piperidine (5). The trans-isomer of the cis piperidine can be isolated and hydrolyzed using aqueous hydrochloric acid to yield the ketol (6). The ketol can then be cyclized with the use of acetic acid and pyrrolidine in refluxing tetrahydrofuran which gives a mixture of ketones. Separation of structure 7 from the mixture and then treatment with methyllithium in ether to produce a carbinol (8). Dehydrating the carbinol with thionyl chloride in methylene chloride gives olefin which can be hydrogenated to produce precoccinelline.

== Mechanism of action ==
Precoccinelline is an alkaloid which acts as an inhibitor of nicotinic acetylcholine receptors (nAChRs). It binds to an allosteric site on nAChRs― a site separate from the ACh recognition site. Of the secreted ladybird alkaloids, precoccinelline was the most potent inhibitor, acting via a non-competitive mechanism.

Targeting nAChRs has several implications including developing insecticides and modulating drug dependence relating to the reward pathway in the brain.
