= Standpipe (street) =

Freestanding water pipe with tap

A standpipe is a freestanding pipe fitted with a tap which is installed outdoors to dispense water in areas which do not supply running water to buildings.

== Use ==
In some Middle Eastern, Caribbean and North African countries a standpipe is used as a communal water supply for neighbourhoods which lack individual housing water service. In areas such as Morocco, standpipes often yield unreliable service and lead to water scarcity for large numbers of people.

In the United Kingdom, an "Emergency Drought Order" permits a water company to shut off the primary water supply to homes, and to supply water instead from tanks or standpipes connected to fire hydrants in the streets. This was done in some areas during the 1976 heat wave, for example.

== Freeze resistance ==
In areas where temperatures sometimes go below freezing, some standpipes are equipped with a feature whereby the mechanism that opens the water valve also uncovers a drainage hole (the 'weep hole') at the base of the pipe so that when the standpipe is closed, the column of water drains into the ground rather than remaining in the pipe where it might freeze, bursting the plumbing. Standpipes equipped with this feature are sometimes called 'frost-free hydrants' although frost buildup can still occur.

== Gallery ==
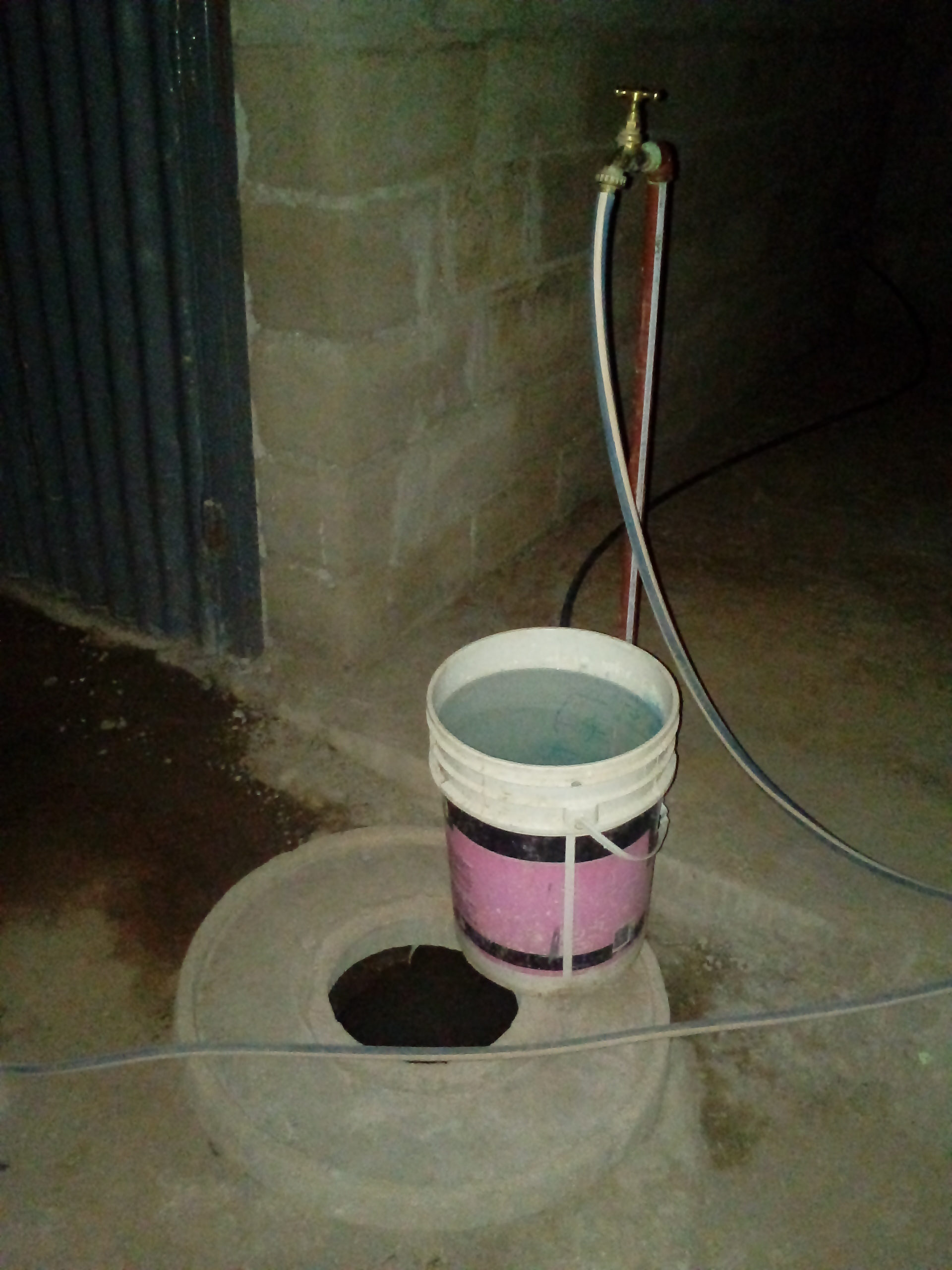
Standpipe at a backyard in Argentina

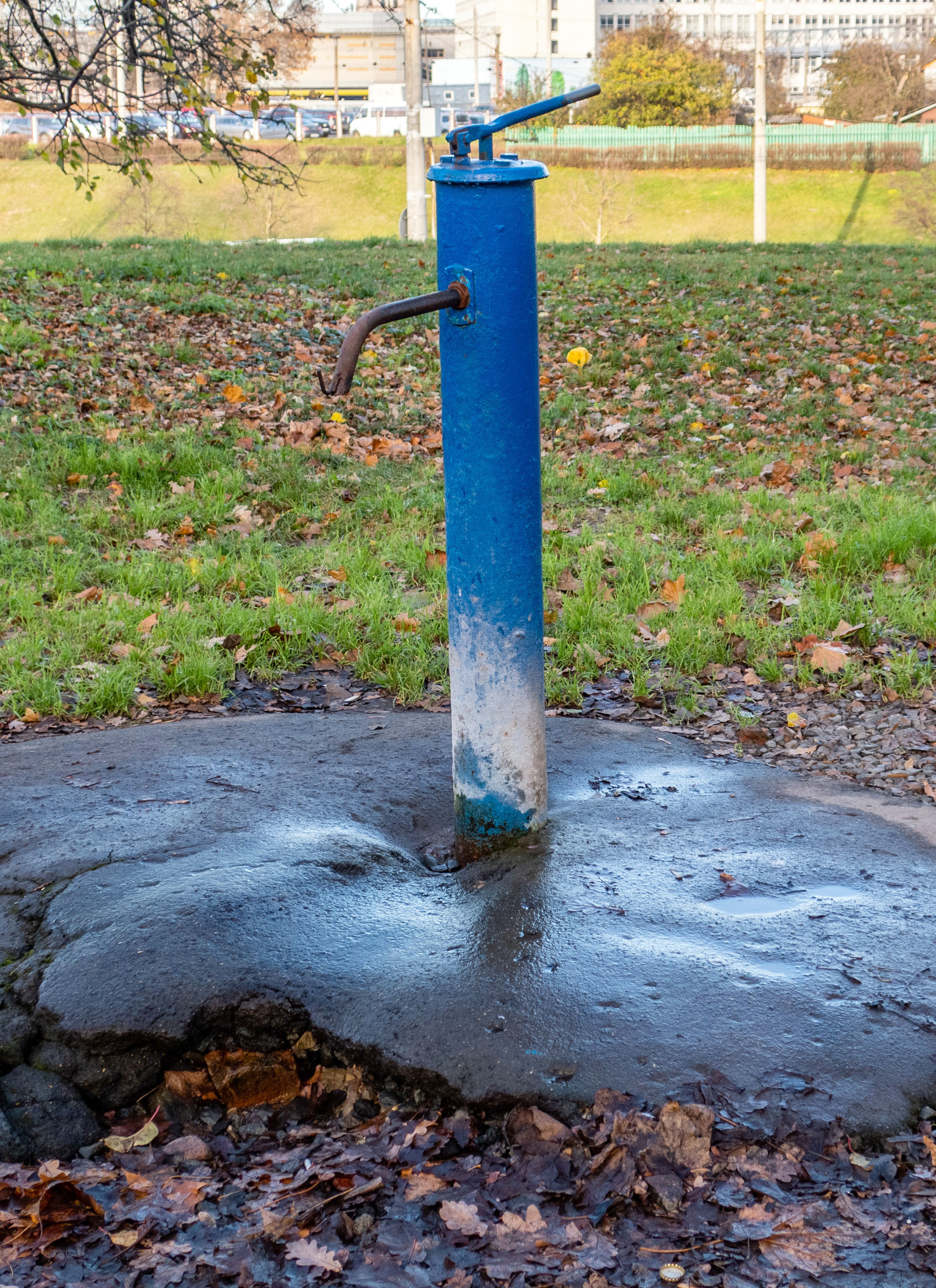
Street standpipe in Minsk

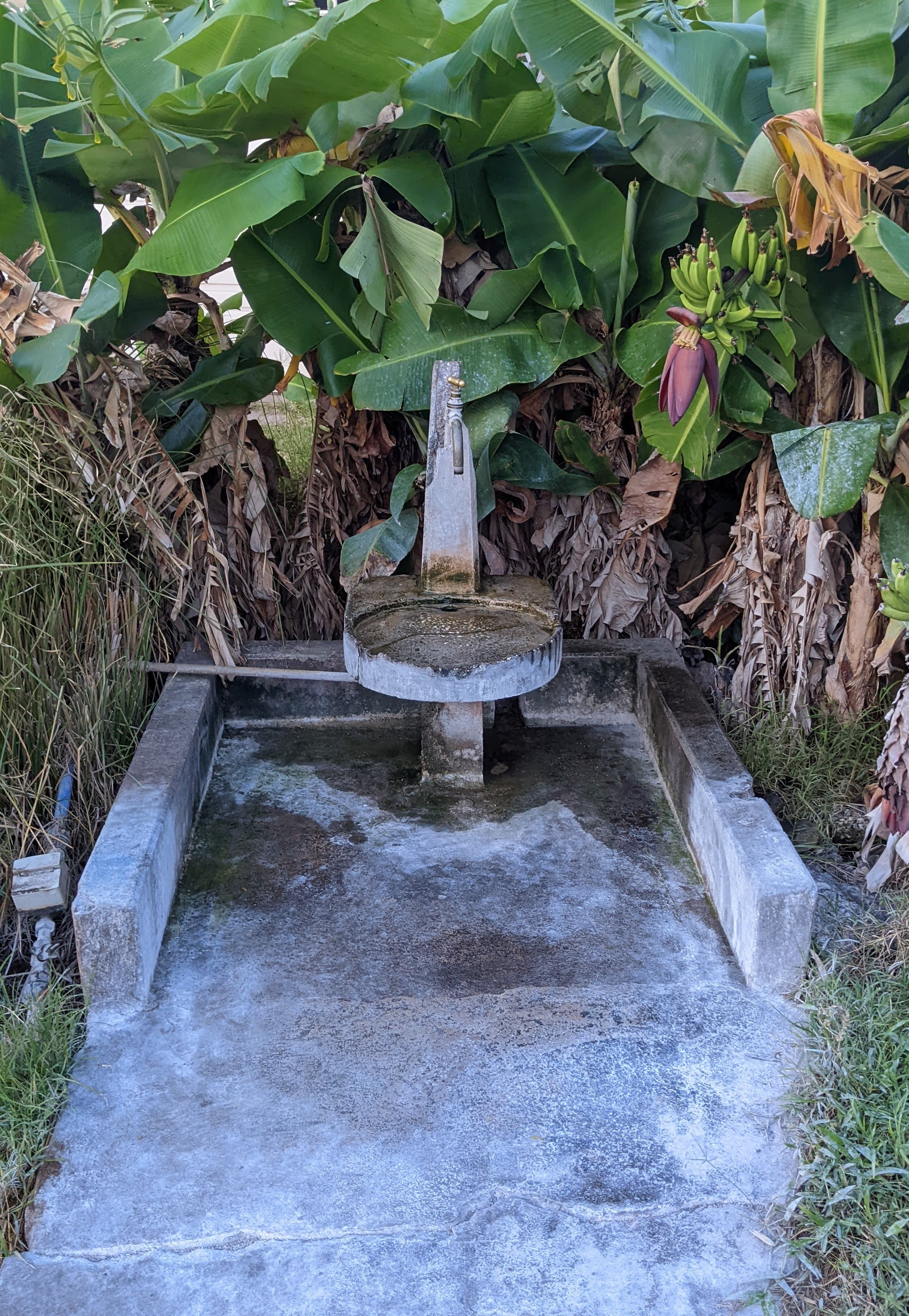
Typical Standpipe in Barbados

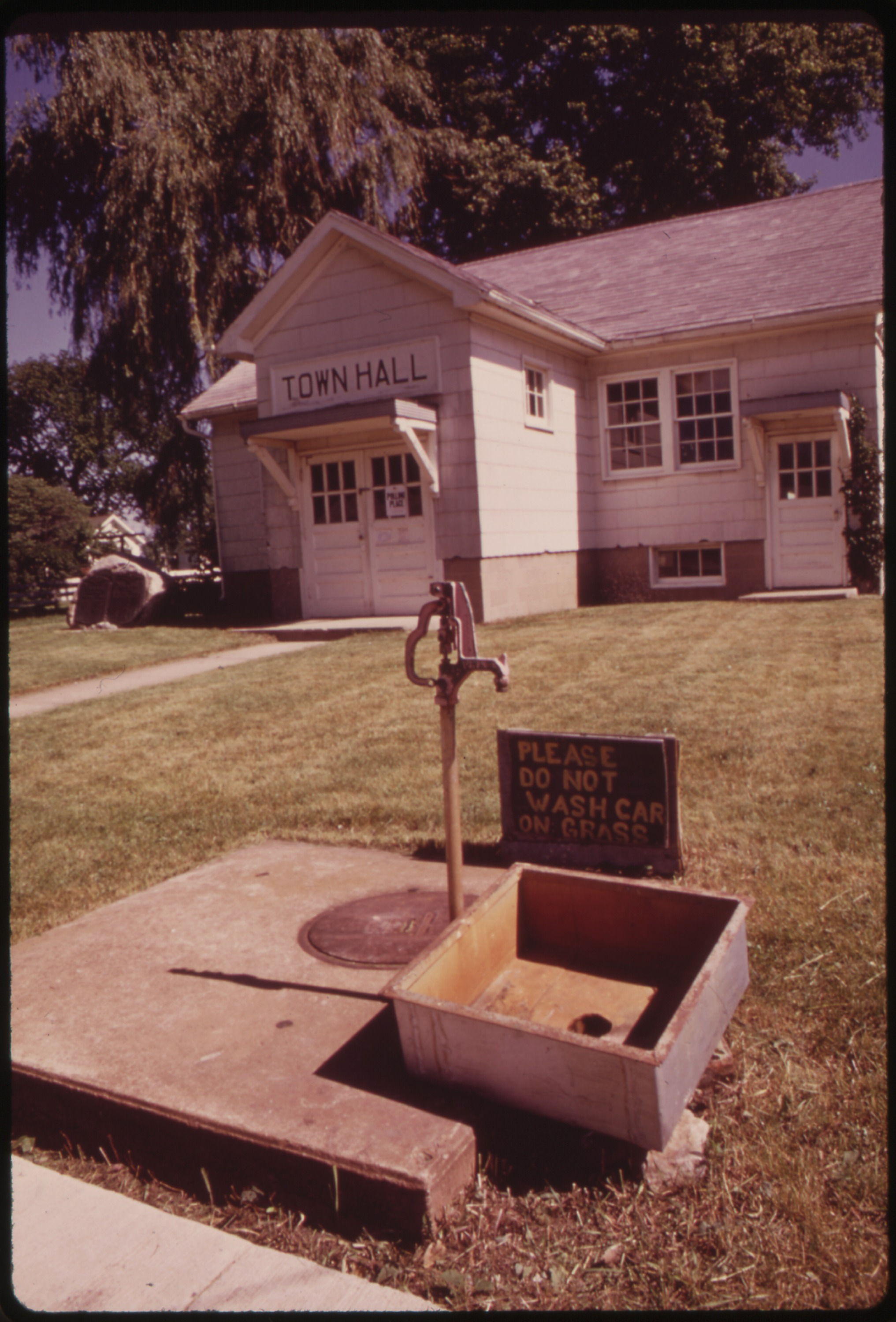
Standpipe in La Rose, Illinois, USA

== See also ==
- Drinking fountain
