= Intraguild predation =

Killing and sometimes eating of potential competitors

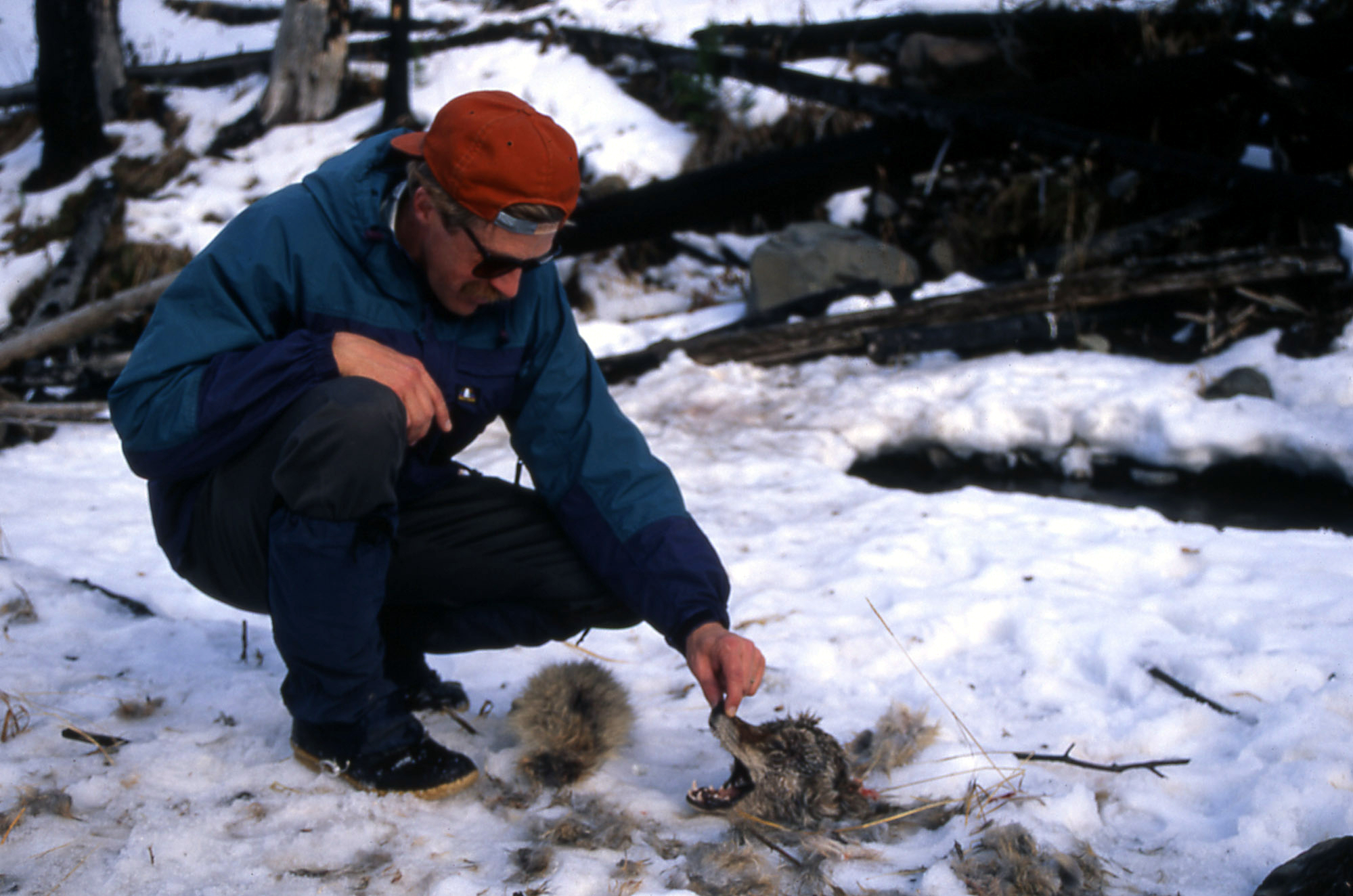
Rolf Peterson investigating the carcass of a coyote killed by a wolf in Yellowstone National Park, January 1996

Intraguild predation, or IGP, is the killing and sometimes eating of a potential competitor of a different species. This interaction represents a combination of predation and competition, because both species rely on the same prey resources and also benefit from preying upon one another. Intraguild predation is common in nature and can be asymmetrical, in which one species feeds upon the other, or symmetrical, in which both species prey upon each other. Because the dominant intraguild predator gains the dual benefits of feeding and eliminating a potential competitor, IGP interactions can have considerable effects on the structure of ecological communities.

== Types ==
Intraguild predation can be classified as asymmetrical or symmetrical. In asymmetrical interactions one species consistently preys upon the other, while in symmetrical interactions both species prey equally upon each other. Intraguild predation can also be age structured, in which case the vulnerability of a species to predation is dependent on age and size, so only juveniles or smaller individuals of one of the predators are fed upon by the other. A wide variety of predatory relationships are possible depending on the symmetry of the interaction and the importance of age structure. IGP interactions can range from predators incidentally eating parasites attached to their prey to direct predation between two apex predators.

== Ecology of intraguild predation ==
Intraguild predation is common in nature and widespread across communities and ecosystems. Intraguild predators must share at least one prey species and usually occupy the same trophic guild, and the degree of IGP depends on factors such as the size, growth, and population density of the predators, as well as the population density and behavior of their shared prey. When creating theoretical models for intraguild predation, the competing species are classified as the "top predator" or the "intermediate predator," (the species more likely to be preyed upon). In theory, intraguild predation is most stable if the top predator benefits strongly from killing off or feeding on the intermediate predator, and if the intermediate predator is a better competitor for the shared prey resource.

The ecological effects of intraguild predation include direct effects on the survival and distribution of the competing predators, as well as indirect effects on the abundance and distribution of prey species and other species within the community. Because they are so common, IGP interactions are important in structuring communities. Intraguild predation may actually benefit the shared prey species by lowering overall predation pressure, particularly if the intermediate predator consumes more of the shared prey. Intraguild predation can also dampen the effects of trophic cascades by providing redundancy in predation: if one predator is removed from the ecosystem, the other is still consuming the same prey species. Asymmetrical IGP can be a particularly strong influence on habitat selection. Often, intermediate predators will avoid otherwise optimal habitat because of the presence of the top predator. Behavioral changes in intermediate predator distribution due to increased risk of predation can influence community structure more than direct mortality caused by the top predators.

== Examples ==
=== Terrestrial ===
Intraguild predation is well documented in terrestrial arthropods such as insects and arachnids. Hemipteran insects and larval lacewings both prey upon aphids, but the competing predators can cause high enough mortality among the lacewings to effectively relieve predation upon the aphids. Several species of centipede are considered to be intraguild predators.

Among the most dramatic examples of intraguild predation are those between large mammalian carnivores. Large canines and felines are the mammal groups most often involved in IGP, with larger species such as lions and gray wolves preying upon smaller species such as foxes and cheetah. In North America, coyotes function as intraguild predators of gray foxes and bobcats, and may exert a strong influence over the population and distribution of gray foxes. However, in areas where wolves have been reintroduced, coyotes become an intermediate predator and experience increased mortality and a more restricted range.

=== Aquatic and marine ===
Intraguild predation is also important in aquatic and marine ecosystems. As top predators in most marine environments, sharks show strong IGP interactions, both between species of sharks and with other top predators like toothed whales. In tropical areas where multiple species of sharks may have significantly overlapping diets, the risk of injury or predation can determine the local range and available prey resources for different species. Large pelagic species such as blue and mako sharks are rarely observed feeding in the same areas as great white sharks, and the presence of white sharks will prevent other species from scavenging on whale carcasses. Intraguild predation between sharks and toothed whales usually involves large sharks preying upon dolphins and porpoises while also competing with them for fish prey, but orcas reverse this trend by preying upon large sharks while competing for large fish and seal prey. Intraguild predation can occur in freshwater systems as well. For example, invertebrate predators such as insect larvae and predatory copepods and cladocerans can act as intraguild prey, with planktivorous fish the interguild predator and herbivorous zooplankton acting as the basal resource.

== Importance to management and conservation ==
The presence and intensity of intraguild predation is important to both management and conservation of species. Human influence on communities and ecosystems can affect the balance of these interactions, and the direct and indirect effects of IGP may have economic consequences.

Fisheries managers have only recently begun to understand the importance of intraguild predation on the availability of fish stocks as they attempt to move towards ecosystem-based management. IGP interactions between sharks and seals may prevent seals from feeding in areas where commercially important fish species are abundant, which may indirectly make more of these fish available to fishermen. However, IGP may also negatively influence fisheries. Intraguild predation by spiny dogfish and various skate species on economically important fishes like cod and haddock have been cited as a possible reason for the slow recovery of the groundfish fishery in the western North Atlantic.

Intraguild predation is also an important consideration for restoring ecosystems. Because the presence of top predators can so strongly affect the distribution and abundance of both intermediate predator and prey species, efforts to either restore or control predator populations can have significant and often unintended ecological consequences. In Yellowstone National Park, the reintroduction of wolves caused them to become intraguild predators of coyotes, which had far-reaching effects on both the animal and plant communities in the park. Intraguild predation is an important ecological interaction, and conservation and management measures will need to take it into consideration.
