= Rhyzobius gratus =

Scientific classification
- Kingdom: Animalia
- Phylum: Arthropoda
- Clade: Pancrustacea
- Class: Insecta
- Order: Coleoptera
- Suborder: Polyphaga
- Infraorder: Cucujiformia
- Family: Coccinellidae
- Genus: Rhyzobius
- Species: R. gratus

Binomial name
- Rhyzobius gratus Weise, 1918

Species of beetle

Rhyzobius gratus is a species of beetle of the family Coccinellidae. It is found in Indonesia (Western New Guinea).

== Description ==
Adults reach a length of about 3 mm (0.12 in). They are similar to Rhyzobius violaceus, Rhyzobius gonzalezi and Rhyzobius luciae by the body size, shape and colouration.

== Taxonomy ==
The species was described by Julius Weise in 1918. His description was probably based on a single female. In a revision of the genus published in 2010, the species was treated as incertae sedis, since the holotype was not available for study.
