= Rhyzobius pseudopulcher =

Scientific classification
- Kingdom: Animalia
- Phylum: Arthropoda
- Clade: Pancrustacea
- Class: Insecta
- Order: Coleoptera
- Suborder: Polyphaga
- Infraorder: Cucujiformia
- Family: Coccinellidae
- Genus: Rhyzobius
- Species: R. pseudopulcher

Binomial name
- Rhyzobius pseudopulcher Tomaszewska, 2010

Species of beetle

Rhyzobius pseudopulcher is a species of beetle of the family Coccinellidae. It is found in Australia (New South Wales, Australian Capital Territory, Queensland, Victoria).

== Description ==
Adults reach a length of about 1.6–1.85 mm (0.063–0.073 in). They have a broadly oval, moderately convex body. The elytra are reddish or yellowish with a dark brown or black pattern. The ventral surface is dark brown with the legs yellowish brown. The antennae are yellowish brown. The dorsum has moderately long pubescence, forming a wavy pattern on the elytra.

== Etymology ==
The species name refers to its similarity to Rhyzobius pulcher.
