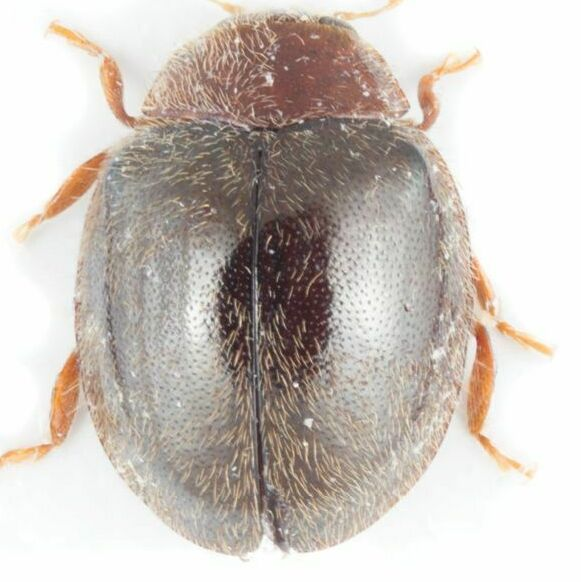

Scientific classification
- Kingdom: Animalia
- Phylum: Arthropoda
- Clade: Pancrustacea
- Class: Insecta
- Order: Coleoptera
- Suborder: Polyphaga
- Infraorder: Cucujiformia
- Family: Coccinellidae
- Genus: Rhyzobius
- Species: R. lophanthae

Binomial name
- Rhyzobius lophanthae (Blaisdell, 1892)

Synonyms
- Scymnus lophanthae Blaisdell, 1892; Rhizobius toowoombae Blackburn, 1892; Pullus coeruleipennis Sicard, 1909: 139; Rhyzobius unguicularis Weise, 1922; Nothorhyzobius ruficollis Brèthes, 1925

= Rhyzobius lophanthae =

Species of beetle

Rhyzobius lophanthae, commonly known as the purple scale predator or the scale-eating ladybird, is a species of ladybird native to Queensland and Southern Australia. It was introduced into the United States in the 1890s and has since spread over the southern half of the country.

== Taxonomy ==
This insect was first described in California in 1892 by the American entomologist Frank Ellsworth Blaisdell. He named it Scymnus lophanthae, and thought it was a native American species. Unbeknown to him, the beetle was an introduced species, and at about the same time, it was described in its native Australia by the Australian entomologist Thomas Blackburn, who gave it the name Rhizobius toowoombae. However, Blaisdell's name took precedence as it was published first, and R. toowoombae became a synonym. The specific name lophanthae means "of lophantha", referring to the plant Paraserianthes lophantha on which Blaisdell originally saw the ladybird.

== Description ==
Rhyzobius lophanthae is a small ladybird with a length between 1.7 and 2.85 mm (0.07 and 0.11 in) and a width of between 1.35 and 2.0 mm (0.05 and 0.08 in). The head and prothorax are reddish-brown, as is the underside, both being densely covered with short hairs of two lengths. The elytra (wing cases) are blackish, often with a metallic bronze sheen. The larvae are dark brown and is clad in stout spines.

== Distribution and habitat ==
Rhyzobius lophanthae is native to Australia where it is present in Queensland and Southern Australia. It was introduced into California in 1892 in an attempt to control the olive scale (Saissetia oleae). It has since spread over much of the southern United States. It can also be found in Europe.

== Ecology ==
Both adults and larvae feed on scale insects, and especially on armoured scales at all periods of their development; they also feed on mealybugs. The younger beetle larvae crawl under the adult scale insect's protective scale, feeding on the scale nymphs before they disperse. These insects are a pest of citrus, sucking the sap from the plants, and the ladybirds have been used in biological pest control, in order to reduce the number of scale insects in the crop.
