= Rhyzobius similis =

Scientific classification
- Kingdom: Animalia
- Phylum: Arthropoda
- Clade: Pancrustacea
- Class: Insecta
- Order: Coleoptera
- Suborder: Polyphaga
- Infraorder: Cucujiformia
- Family: Coccinellidae
- Genus: Rhyzobius
- Species: R. similis

Binomial name
- Rhyzobius similis Tomaszewska, 2010

Species of beetle

Rhyzobius similis is a species of beetle of the family Coccinellidae. It is found in Australia (Western Australia, South Australia, Victoria, New South Wales).

== Description ==
Adults reach a length of about 2.2–2.5 mm (0.087–0.098 in). They have a broadly oval, moderately convex body. The head, pronotum and elytra are orange brown, each elytron with a long dark brown marking. The ventral surface is mostly orange brown and the antennae and legs are yellowish brown. The pubescence on the dorsum consists of appresed setae and dark stiff bristles along the margins. The pubescence forms a wavy pattern on the elytra.

== Etymology ==
The species name is Latin (meaning similar) and refers to similarity to Rhyzobius noctuabundus.
