= Rhyzobius discoidalis =

Scientific classification
- Kingdom: Animalia
- Phylum: Arthropoda
- Clade: Pancrustacea
- Class: Insecta
- Order: Coleoptera
- Suborder: Polyphaga
- Infraorder: Cucujiformia
- Family: Coccinellidae
- Genus: Rhyzobius
- Species: R. discoidalis

Binomial name
- Rhyzobius discoidalis Weise, 1923

Species of beetle

Rhyzobius discoidalis is a species of beetle of the family Coccinellidae. It is found in Australia (Queensland, New South Wales).

== Description ==
Adults reach a length of about 2.17–2.73 mm (0.085–0.107 in). They have an elongate oval, moderately convex body. They are dark brown to almost black, with the anterior angles of the pronotum pale yellow and the elytra with a pale sutural spot. The antennae are yellowish. The pubescence on the dorsum consists of appresed setae and stiff bristles and forms a wavy pattern on the elytra.
