= Rhyzobius nubilus =

Scientific classification
- Kingdom: Animalia
- Phylum: Arthropoda
- Clade: Pancrustacea
- Class: Insecta
- Order: Coleoptera
- Suborder: Polyphaga
- Infraorder: Cucujiformia
- Family: Coccinellidae
- Genus: Rhyzobius
- Species: R. nubilus

Binomial name
- Rhyzobius nubilus Weise, 1908

Species of beetle

Rhyzobius nubilus is a species of beetle of the family Coccinellidae. It is found in New Zealand.

== Description ==
Adults reach a length of about 2.15 mm (0.085 in). They have an elongate oval, moderately convex body. They are mostly yellowish brown, with some of the ventral surface and abdomen blackish. The pubescence on the dorsum consists of appresed setae and dark stiff bristles along the margins. The pubescence forms a wavy pattern on the elytra.
