= Rhyzobius subhirtellus =

Scientific classification
- Kingdom: Animalia
- Phylum: Arthropoda
- Clade: Pancrustacea
- Class: Insecta
- Order: Coleoptera
- Suborder: Polyphaga
- Infraorder: Cucujiformia
- Family: Coccinellidae
- Genus: Rhyzobius
- Species: R. subhirtellus

Binomial name
- Rhyzobius subhirtellus Lea, 1926

Species of beetle

Rhyzobius subhirtellus is a species of beetle of the family Coccinellidae. It is found in Australia (Western Australia).

== Description ==
Adults reach a length of about 1.9–2.4 mm (0.075–0.094 in). They have a broadly oval, strongly convex body. They are mostly dark brown, but the elytra are dark chestnut brown and the antennae and legs are yellowish brown. The pubescence on the dorsum consists of appresed setae and dark stiff bristles, forming a wavy pattern on the elytra.
