= Rhyzobius newtonorum =

Scientific classification
- Kingdom: Animalia
- Phylum: Arthropoda
- Clade: Pancrustacea
- Class: Insecta
- Order: Coleoptera
- Suborder: Polyphaga
- Infraorder: Cucujiformia
- Family: Coccinellidae
- Genus: Rhyzobius
- Species: R. newtonorum

Binomial name
- Rhyzobius newtonorum Tomaszewska, 2010

Species of beetle

Rhyzobius newtonorum is a species of beetle of the family Coccinellidae. It is found in Australia (New South Wales).

== Description ==
Adults reach a length of about 2.33–2.5 mm (0.092–0.098 in). They have an elongate oval, moderately convex body. The dorsal surface is blackish, with the lateral margins of the elytra and margins of the pronotum dark brown. The ventral surface is blackish brown and the antennae and legs are somewhat paler. The dorsum is covered with sub-erect pubescence forming a wavy pattern on the elytra.

== Etymology ==
The species is dedicated to Drs. M.K. Thayer and A. Newton, the collectors of the type series.
