= Rhyzobius slipinskii =

Scientific classification
- Kingdom: Animalia
- Phylum: Arthropoda
- Clade: Pancrustacea
- Class: Insecta
- Order: Coleoptera
- Suborder: Polyphaga
- Infraorder: Cucujiformia
- Family: Coccinellidae
- Genus: Rhyzobius
- Species: R. slipinskii

Binomial name
- Rhyzobius slipinskii Tomaszewska, 2010

Species of beetle

Rhyzobius slipinskii is a species of beetle of the family Coccinellidae. It is found in Australia (New South Wales).

== Description ==
Adults reach a length of about 3–3.6 mm (0.12–0.14 in). They have a broadly oval, moderately convex body. They are mostly light brown, while the base of the pronotum is black and the elytra are black (except for the lateral margins along the apical half. The pubescence on the dorsum consists of appresed setae and darker stiff bristles, forming a wavy pattern on the elytra.

== Etymology ==
The species is dedicated to Adam Slipinski, a friend of the author.
