= Rhyzobius laeticulus =

Scientific classification
- Kingdom: Animalia
- Phylum: Arthropoda
- Clade: Pancrustacea
- Class: Insecta
- Order: Coleoptera
- Suborder: Polyphaga
- Infraorder: Cucujiformia
- Family: Coccinellidae
- Genus: Rhyzobius
- Species: R. laeticulus

Binomial name
- Rhyzobius laeticulus Blackburn, 1889

Species of beetle

Rhyzobius laeticulus is a species of beetle of the family Coccinellidae. It is found in Australia (New South Wales, South Australia).

== Description ==
Adults reach a length of about 2.4–2.8 mm (0.094–0.110 in). They have a broadly oval, moderately convex body. They are dark brown, with the disc of the pronotum weakly infuscate and the elytra are blackish with a light brown stripe. Most of the ventral surface is blackish brown. The pubescence on the dorsum consists of appresed setae and some darker stiff bristles along the margins. The pubescence forms a wavy pattern on the elytra.
