= Rhyzobius javeti =

Scientific classification
- Kingdom: Animalia
- Phylum: Arthropoda
- Clade: Pancrustacea
- Class: Insecta
- Order: Coleoptera
- Suborder: Polyphaga
- Infraorder: Cucujiformia
- Family: Coccinellidae
- Genus: Rhyzobius
- Species: R. javeti

Binomial name
- Rhyzobius javeti Mulsant, 1850

Species of beetle

Rhyzobius javeti is a species of beetle of the family Coccinellidae. It is found in South Africa (Western Cape, Northern Cape, Free State).

== Description ==
Adults reach a length of about 2.53–3 mm (0.100–0.118 in). They have an elongate oval, moderately convex body. The head, pronotum, legs and two spots on each elytron are light brown or brown. The ground colour of the elytra, and abdomen are sometimes blackish or dark brown. The pubescence on the dorsum consists of appresed setae and dark stiff bristles.
