= Rhyzobius approximatus =

Scientific classification
- Kingdom: Animalia
- Phylum: Arthropoda
- Clade: Pancrustacea
- Class: Insecta
- Order: Coleoptera
- Suborder: Polyphaga
- Infraorder: Cucujiformia
- Family: Coccinellidae
- Genus: Rhyzobius
- Species: R. approximatus

Binomial name
- Rhyzobius approximatus Blackburn, 1889

Species of beetle

Rhyzobius approximatus is a species of beetle of the family Coccinellidae. It is found in Australia (South Australia).

== Description ==
Adults reach a length of about 1.70 mm (0.067 in). They have an elongate oval, moderately convex body. They are light brown, with the lateral margins of the pronotum yellowish and with the ventral surface and abdomen dark brown. There is moderately long pubescence on the dorsum, forming a weak wavy pattern on the elytra.
