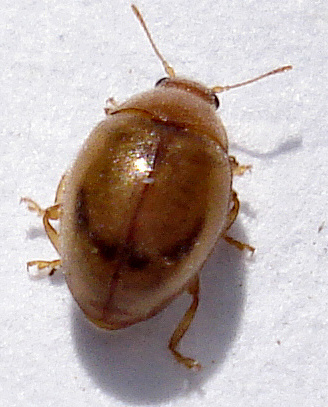
- Adult, probably R. chrysomeloides

Scientific classification
- Kingdom: Animalia
- Phylum: Arthropoda
- Clade: Pancrustacea
- Class: Insecta
- Order: Coleoptera
- Suborder: Polyphaga
- Infraorder: Cucujiformia
- Family: Coccinellidae
- Subfamily: Coccidulinae
- Tribe: Coccidulini
- Genus: Rhyzobius; Stephens, 1832

Type species
- Nitidula litura Fabricius, 1787

Synonyms
- Rhizobius Agassiz, 1846 (unjustified emendation; non Burmeister, 1835: preoccupied); Lindorus Casey, 1899; Rhizobiellus Oke, 1951; Nothorhyzobius Brethes, 1924

= Rhyzobius =

Genus of beetles

Rhizobius is a genus in the fungi kingdom (see Disease resistance in fruit and vegetables), as well as an obsolete name for the aphid genus Pemphigus.

Rhyzobius is a genus in the lady beetle family (Coccinellidae). It belongs to tribe Coccidulini of subfamily Coccidulinae, which is sometimes subsumed in the Coccinellinae as a tribe with the Coccidulini downranked to subtribe.

The genus was established by J.F. Stephens in 1832. Often misspelled as "Rhizobius", that is actually an older name, now suppressed, for a genus of woolly aphids. The misspelling was first made in the original description in 1832; however, Stephens had used the name in 1829 already (as nomen nudum) and written it "Rhyzobius", so this spelling is used now. Louis Agassiz in 1846 argued that Stephens intended to write "Rhizobius" all along and formally proposed to change the name thus, but this is considered unwarranted.

Species of Rhyzobius can be found almost anywhere on Earth. Rhyzobius lophanthae is used for biological pest control in Australia, namely scale insects (Coccoidea).

== Species ==
106 species are recognised in the most recent worldwide revision, including:

- Rhyzobius albinos
- Rhyzobius alphabeticus
- Rhyzobius amabilis
- Rhyzobius angolensis
- †Rhyzobius antiquus
- Rhyzobius apicalis
- Rhyzobius apicesignatus
- Rhyzobius approximatus
- Rhyzobius atramentarius
- Rhyzobius aurantii
- Rhyzobius bicolor
- Rhyzobius bielawskii Tomaszewska, 2010^{g}
- Rhyzobius bilineatus
- Rhyzobius bipartitus Fuente, 1918^{g}
- Rhyzobius bipunctatus
- Rhyzobius boothi
- Rhyzobius brevicornis
- Rhyzobius breweri
- Rhyzobius brunneus
- Rhyzobius burmeisteri
- Rhyzobius caecus
- Rhyzobius calderi
- Rhyzobius chrysomeloides (Herbst, 1792)^{g}
- Rhyzobius consors
- Rhyzobius c-pallidum
- Rhyzobius cyaneus
- Rhyzobius decoratus
- Rhyzobius decussatolobatus
- Rhyzobius densepunctatus
- Rhyzobius discipennis
- Rhyzobius discoidalis
- Rhyzobius discolor
- Rhyzobius dorsalis
- Rhyzobius dryandra
- Rhyzobius eminens
- Rhyzobius ephippiatus
- Rhyzobius evansii
- Rhyzobius eximius
- Rhyzobius fagus (Broun, 1880)^{g}
- Rhyzobius fasciculatus
- Rhyzobius filicis
- Rhyzobius forestieri (Mulsant, 1853)^{i c g b}
- Rhyzobius fugax
- Rhyzobius gingera
- Rhyzobius gonzalezi
- Rhyzobius gordoni
- Rhyzobius gosfordensis
- †Rhyzobius gratiosus
- Rhyzobius gratus
- †Rhyzobius groehni
- Rhyzobius hirtellus
- Rhyzobius hongae
- Rhyzobius indicus
- Rhyzobius insipidus
- Rhyzobius iracildae
- Rhyzobius javeti
- Rhyzobius jaya
- Rhyzobius josephi
- Rhyzobius klapperichi
- Rhyzobius laeticulus
- Rhyzobius leai
- Rhyzobius leucochaetus
- Rhyzobius lineellus
- Rhyzobius litura (Fabricius, 1787)^{g}
- Rhyzobius lophanthae (Blaisdell, 1892)^{i c g b} (purple scale predator)
- Rhyzobius luciae
- Rhyzobius macromaculatus
- Rhyzobius metallicus
- Rhyzobius micrus
- Rhyzobius minutulus
- Rhyzobius nataliae
- Rhyzobius newtonorum
- Rhyzobius nigripennis Fauvel, 1903^{g}
- Rhyzobius nigritulus
- Rhyzobius nigromarginatus
- Rhyzobius nigrovarius
- Rhyzobius nitidus
- Rhyzobius noctuabundus
- Rhyzobius nubilus
- Rhyzobius occidentalis
- Rhyzobius pallidiceps
- Rhyzobius papuensis
- Rhyzobius pelion
- Rhyzobius pictus
- Rhyzobius poorani
- Rhyzobius popei
- Rhyzobius prolongatus
- Rhyzobius pseudopulcher
- Rhyzobius pulchellus (Montrouzier, 1861)^{g}
- Rhyzobius pulcher
- Rhyzobius quadrifenestratus
- Rhyzobius quadrimaculatus
- Rhyzobius rarus
- Rhyzobius reidi
- Rhyzobius riedeli
- Rhyzobius rodmani
- Rhyzobius secessus
- Rhyzobius sedatus
- Rhyzobius serratus
- Rhyzobius similis
- Rhyzobius slipinskii
- †Rhyzobius sontagae
- Rhyzobius speculifer
- Rhyzobius subhirtellus
- Rhyzobius suffusus
- Rhyzobius sumatrensis
- †Rhyzobius szwedo
- Rhyzobius tasmanicus
- Rhyzobius teresae
- Rhyzobius terrenus
- Rhyzobius thoracicus
- Rhyzobius tribulation
- Rhyzobius tristis
- Rhyzobius umbratus
- Rhyzobius unicolor
- Rhyzobius ventralis (Erichson, 1842)^{i c g}
- Rhyzobius victoriensis
- Rhyzobius villosus
- Rhyzobius violaceus
- Rhyzobius virgatus
- Rhyzobius viridipennis
- Rhyzobius wanati Tomaszewska, 2010^{g}
- Rhyzobius waterhousii
- Rhyzobius weiri
- Rhyzobius xanthurus

Data sources: i = ITIS, c = Catalogue of Life, g = GBIF, b = Bugguide.net
