= Rhyzobius boothi =

Scientific classification
- Kingdom: Animalia
- Phylum: Arthropoda
- Clade: Pancrustacea
- Class: Insecta
- Order: Coleoptera
- Suborder: Polyphaga
- Infraorder: Cucujiformia
- Family: Coccinellidae
- Genus: Rhyzobius
- Species: R. boothi

Binomial name
- Rhyzobius boothi Tomaszewska, 2010

Species of beetle

Rhyzobius boothi is a species of beetle of the family Coccinellidae. It is found in Australia (Western Australia, Northern Territory, South Australia).

== Description ==
Adults reach a length of about 1.5–1.8 mm (0.059–0.071 in). They have a broadly oval, moderately convex body. They are reddish brown and there is moderately long pubescence on the dorsum, forming a wavy pattern on the elytra.

== Etymology ==
The species is dedicated to British coccinellid specialist Dr. Roger Booth.
