= Rhyzobius victoriensis =

Scientific classification
- Kingdom: Animalia
- Phylum: Arthropoda
- Clade: Pancrustacea
- Class: Insecta
- Order: Coleoptera
- Suborder: Polyphaga
- Infraorder: Cucujiformia
- Family: Coccinellidae
- Genus: Rhyzobius
- Species: R. victoriensis

Binomial name
- Rhyzobius victoriensis Tomaszewska, 2010

Species of beetle

Rhyzobius victoriensis is a species of beetle of the family Coccinellidae. It is found in Australia (Victoria).

== Description ==
Adults reach a length of about 2.43–2.73 mm (0.096–0.107 in). They have a broadly oval, strongly convex body. The dorsal surface, antennae and legs are mostly dark brown to chestnut brown, while the head, most of the pronotum and two or three markings on each elytron are blackish. The ventral surface is dark chestnut brown to blackish brown. The pubescence on the dorsum consists of appresed setae and darker stiff bristles along the margins. The pubescence forms a wavy pattern on the elytra.

== Etymology ==
The name of the species refers to the Australian State of Victoria where it was collected.
