= Rhyzobius filicis =

Scientific classification
- Kingdom: Animalia
- Phylum: Arthropoda
- Clade: Pancrustacea
- Class: Insecta
- Order: Coleoptera
- Suborder: Polyphaga
- Infraorder: Cucujiformia
- Family: Coccinellidae
- Genus: Rhyzobius
- Species: R. filicis

Binomial name
- Rhyzobius filicis Lea, 1929

Species of beetle

Rhyzobius filicis is a species of beetle of the family Coccinellidae. It is found in Australia (Lord Howe Island).

== Description ==
Adults reach a length of about 2.3–2.6 mm (0.091–0.102 in). They have an elongate oval, moderately convex body. They are blackish with a dark chestnut spot on each elytron. The ventral surface is dark chestnut brown to blackish, with the antennae and legs usually lighter. There is moderately long pubescence on the dorsum, forming a wavy pattern on the elytra.
