= Rhyzobius xanthurus =

Scientific classification
- Kingdom: Animalia
- Phylum: Arthropoda
- Clade: Pancrustacea
- Class: Insecta
- Order: Coleoptera
- Suborder: Polyphaga
- Infraorder: Cucujiformia
- Family: Coccinellidae
- Genus: Rhyzobius
- Species: R. xanthurus

Binomial name
- Rhyzobius xanthurus Mulsant, 1850

Synonyms
- Rhizobius tricolor Lea, 1902

Species of beetle

Rhyzobius xanthurus is a species of beetle of the family Coccinellidae. It is found in Australia (Tasmania, Victoria, New South Wales, Western Australia).

== Description ==
Adults reach a length of about 5–5.8 mm (0.20–0.23 in). They have an elongate oval, flattened body. They are mostly black, the elytra with a metallic blue or purple sheen and the pronotum with the anterior angles pale yellow. The antennae are orange brown. The pubescence on the dorsum consists of appresed setae and stiff bristles, forming a wavy pattern on the elytra.
