= Rhyzobius waterhousii =

Scientific classification
- Kingdom: Animalia
- Phylum: Arthropoda
- Clade: Pancrustacea
- Class: Insecta
- Order: Coleoptera
- Suborder: Polyphaga
- Infraorder: Cucujiformia
- Family: Coccinellidae
- Genus: Rhyzobius
- Species: R. waterhousii

Binomial name
- Rhyzobius waterhousii (Mulsant, 1850)

Synonyms
- Scymnus waterhousii Mulsant, 1850; Rhizobius speratus Blackburn, 1889

Species of beetle

Rhyzobius waterhousii is a species of beetle of the family Coccinellidae. It is found in Australia (Tasmania, South Australia, Victoria, Northern Territory, New South Wales, Australian Capital Territory).

== Description ==
Adults reach a length of about 1.6–2 mm (0.063–0.079 in). They have a broadly oval, moderately convex body. The dorsal surface is light to dark brown with three pale markings on each elytron. The ventral surface is dark brown with the legs and antennae light brown. The dorsum has rather short pubescence, forming a wavy pattern on the elytra.
