= Rhyzobius dorsalis =

Scientific classification
- Kingdom: Animalia
- Phylum: Arthropoda
- Clade: Pancrustacea
- Class: Insecta
- Order: Coleoptera
- Suborder: Polyphaga
- Infraorder: Cucujiformia
- Family: Coccinellidae
- Genus: Rhyzobius
- Species: R. dorsalis

Binomial name
- Rhyzobius dorsalis Blackburn, 1892

Species of beetle

Rhyzobius dorsalis is a species of beetle of the family Coccinellidae. It is found in Australia (New South Wales).

== Description ==
Adults reach a length of about 2.3–2.55 mm (0.091–0.100 in). They have a broadly oval, moderately convex body. They are dark brown to dark chestnut brown, with the elytra weakly infuscate. The legs are orange brown and the antennae are yellowish brown. The pubescence on the dorsum consists of appresed setae and stiff bristles, forming a wavy pattern on the elytra.
