= Rhyzobius ephippiatus =

Scientific classification
- Kingdom: Animalia
- Phylum: Arthropoda
- Clade: Pancrustacea
- Class: Insecta
- Order: Coleoptera
- Suborder: Polyphaga
- Infraorder: Cucujiformia
- Family: Coccinellidae
- Genus: Rhyzobius
- Species: R. ephippiatus

Binomial name
- Rhyzobius ephippiatus Weise, 1923

Species of beetle

Rhyzobius ephippiatus is a species of beetle of the family Coccinellidae. It is found in Australia (Queensland, New South Wales).

== Description ==
Adults reach a length of about 2.15–2.35 mm (0.085–0.093 in). They have a broadly oval, moderately convex body. They are light brown or brown, the elytra with a large, black spot. The pubescence on the dorsum consists of appresed setae and stiff bristles.
