= Rhyzobius leai =

Scientific classification
- Kingdom: Animalia
- Phylum: Arthropoda
- Clade: Pancrustacea
- Class: Insecta
- Order: Coleoptera
- Suborder: Polyphaga
- Infraorder: Cucujiformia
- Family: Coccinellidae
- Genus: Rhyzobius
- Species: R. leai

Binomial name
- Rhyzobius leai Tomaszewska, 2010

Species of beetle

Rhyzobius leai is a species of beetle of the family Coccinellidae. It is found in Australia (Queensland).

== Description ==
Adults reach a length of about 2–2.25 mm (0.079–0.089 in). They have a broadly oval, strongly convex body. They are brown to chestnut brown, with the lateral margins of the pronotum paler. The elytra have pale, curved stripes surrounding a darker area. The antennae are yellowish brown. The pubescence on the dorsum consists of appresed setae and darker stiff bristles.

== Etymology ==
The species is dedicated to the famous Australian coleopterist Dr. A.M. Lea.
