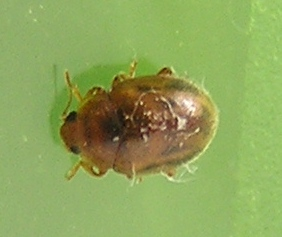

Scientific classification
- Kingdom: Animalia
- Phylum: Arthropoda
- Clade: Pancrustacea
- Class: Insecta
- Order: Coleoptera
- Suborder: Polyphaga
- Infraorder: Cucujiformia
- Family: Coccinellidae
- Genus: Rhyzobius
- Species: R. chrysomeloides

Binomial name
- Rhyzobius chrysomeloides (Herbst, 1792)

Synonyms
- Strongylus chrysomeloides Herbst, 1792; Rhizobius lineatellus Mulsant, 1846; Rhizobius subdepressus Seidlitz, 1872

= Rhyzobius chrysomeloides =

Species of beetle

Rhyzobius chrysomeloides, the round-keeled Rhyzobius, is a species of beetle in the family Coccinellidae. It is found in most of Europe, North Africa and northern Asia.

== Life History ==
R. chrysomeloides is a predatory species, feeding on aphids. R. chrysomeloides can typically be found on various species of trees and garden shrubs, first being recorded in Britain in 1996 on a pine tree.

== Description ==
Adults reach a length of about 2.55–3.15 mm (0.100–0.124 in). They have an elongate oval, elongate oval, distinctly flattened body. The pronotum is brown and the elytra are reddish with a black pattern. The antenna and legs are brown. R. chrysomeloides is visually similar to Rhyzoius litura, but can be differentiated by its broader prosternal keel and the darker, U-shaped markings on its elytra.
