= Rhyzobius eminens =

Scientific classification
- Kingdom: Animalia
- Phylum: Arthropoda
- Clade: Pancrustacea
- Class: Insecta
- Order: Coleoptera
- Suborder: Polyphaga
- Infraorder: Cucujiformia
- Family: Coccinellidae
- Genus: Rhyzobius
- Species: R. eminens

Binomial name
- Rhyzobius eminens Blackburn, 1895

Species of beetle

Rhyzobius eminens is a species of beetle of the family Coccinellidae. It is found in Australia (Queensland, New South Wales).

== Description ==
Adults reach a length of about 2.2–2.87 mm (0.087–0.113 in). They have a broadly oval, strongly convex body. They are mostly yellowish brown or dark brown, while the elytra are black with a green or blue metallic sheen. The pubescence on the dorsum consists of appresed setae and moderately dense, dark stiff bristles. The pubescence forms a wavy pattern on the elytra.
