= Rhyzobius thoracicus =

Scientific classification
- Kingdom: Animalia
- Phylum: Arthropoda
- Clade: Pancrustacea
- Class: Insecta
- Order: Coleoptera
- Suborder: Polyphaga
- Infraorder: Cucujiformia
- Family: Coccinellidae
- Genus: Rhyzobius
- Species: R. thoracicus

Binomial name
- Rhyzobius thoracicus Fürsch, 2007

Species of beetle

Rhyzobius thoracicus is a species of beetle of the family Coccinellidae. It is found in South Africa (south-western Cape).

== Description ==
Adults reach a length of about 2.53 mm (0.100 in). They have an elongate oval, flattened body. They are dark brown and the pubescence on the dorsum consists of appresed setae and dark stiff bristles.
