= Rhyzobius fugax =

Scientific classification
- Kingdom: Animalia
- Phylum: Arthropoda
- Clade: Pancrustacea
- Class: Insecta
- Order: Coleoptera
- Suborder: Polyphaga
- Infraorder: Cucujiformia
- Family: Coccinellidae
- Genus: Rhyzobius
- Species: R. fugax

Binomial name
- Rhyzobius fugax Blackburn, 1892

Species of beetle

Rhyzobius fugax is a species of beetle of the family Coccinellidae. It is found in Australia (New South Wales, Queensland).

== Description ==
Adults reach a length of about 3.7–4.3 mm (0.15–0.17 in). They have a broadly oval, moderately convex body. They are chestnut brown to dark chestnut brown, with the antennae sometimes yellowish brown. The pubescence on the dorsum consists of appresed setae and stiff bristles, and forms a wavy pattern on the elytra.
