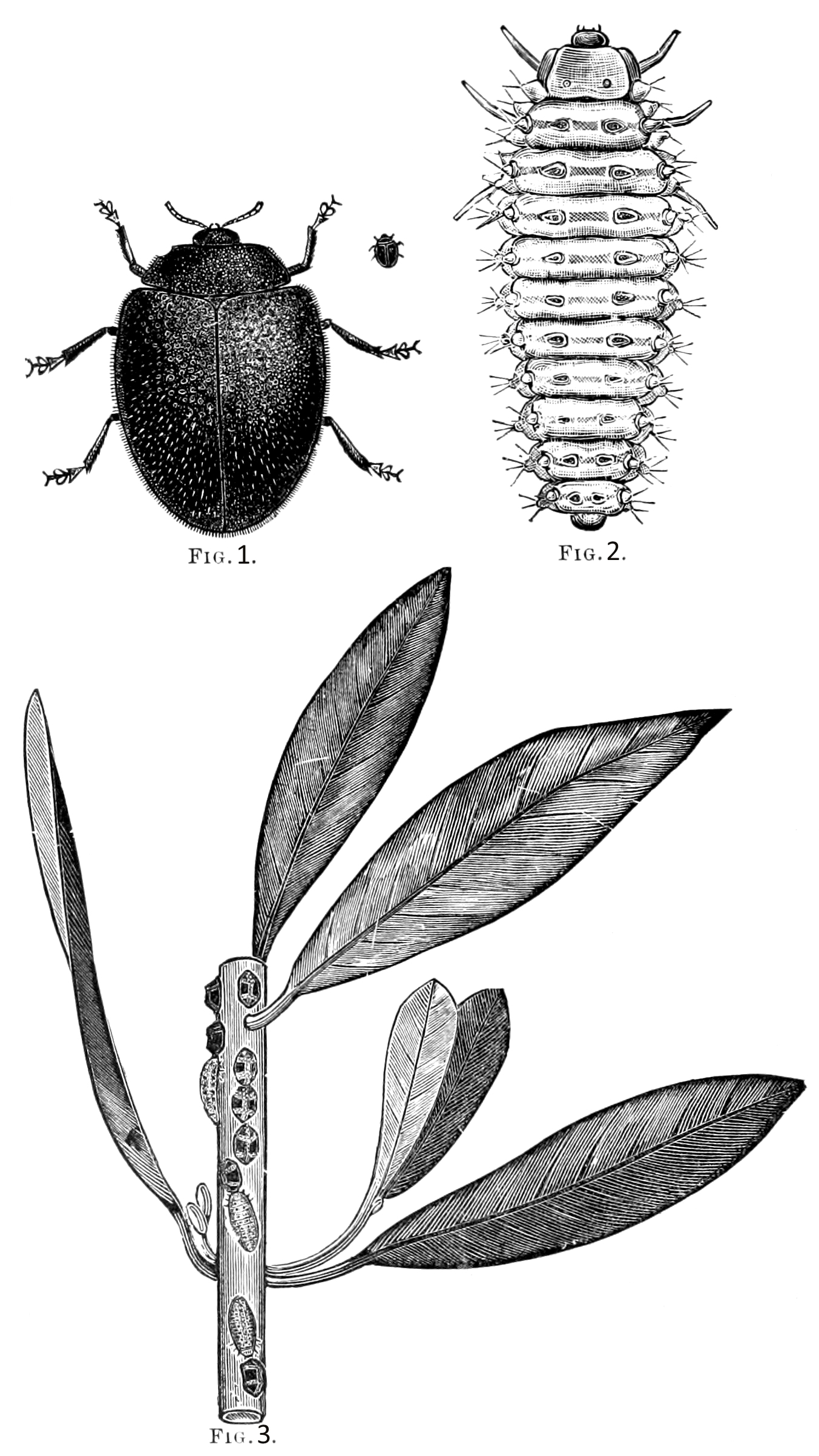

Scientific classification
- Kingdom: Animalia
- Phylum: Arthropoda
- Clade: Pancrustacea
- Class: Insecta
- Order: Coleoptera
- Suborder: Polyphaga
- Infraorder: Cucujiformia
- Family: Coccinellidae
- Genus: Rhyzobius
- Species: R. ventralis

Binomial name
- Rhyzobius ventralis (Erichson, 1842)

Synonyms
- Scymnus ventralis Erichson, 1842; Scymnus halli Broun, 1914; Scymnus restitutor Sharp, 1889

= Rhyzobius ventralis =

Species of beetle

Rhyzobius ventralis, common names including black lady beetle, gumtree scale ladybird, is a ladybird species endemic to Tasmania and all the mainland states of Australia except the Northern Territory. It is also found in New Zealand, but not naturally. The earliest New Zealand record is Auckland, 1898 (Kuschel, 1990: 60)

== Description ==
Adults reach a length of about 4.25–5.35 mm (0.167–0.211 in). They have a broadly oval, moderately convex body. They are mostly black, while the anterior angles of the pronotum are pale yellow and the antennae brownish. The pubescence on the dorsum consists of short appresed setae and darker stiff bristles along the margins. The pubescence forms a wavy pattern on the elytra.
