= Rhyzobius discolor =

Scientific classification
- Kingdom: Animalia
- Phylum: Arthropoda
- Clade: Pancrustacea
- Class: Insecta
- Order: Coleoptera
- Suborder: Polyphaga
- Infraorder: Cucujiformia
- Family: Coccinellidae
- Genus: Rhyzobius
- Species: R. discolor

Binomial name
- Rhyzobius discolor (Erichson, 1842)

Synonyms
- Scymnus discolor Erichson, 1842

Species of beetle

Rhyzobius discolor is a species of beetle of the family Coccinellidae. It is found in Australia (Tasmania, Victoria, Australian Capital Territory, New South Wales).

== Description ==
Adults reach a length of about 2.9–4.7 mm (0.11–0.19 in). They have an elongate oval, moderately convex body. They are brownish black or black, while the head, lateral and anterior margins of the pronotum and sometimes the lateral margins of the elytra brown. The ventral surface is dark brown and the antennae and legs sometimes paler than the ventral surface. The pubescence on the dorsum consists of appresed setae and stiff bristles, forming a wavy pattern on the elytra.
