= Rhyzobius wanati =

Scientific classification
- Kingdom: Animalia
- Phylum: Arthropoda
- Clade: Pancrustacea
- Class: Insecta
- Order: Coleoptera
- Suborder: Polyphaga
- Infraorder: Cucujiformia
- Family: Coccinellidae
- Genus: Rhyzobius
- Species: R. wanati

Binomial name
- Rhyzobius wanati Tomaszewska, 2010

Species of beetle

Rhyzobius wanati is a species of beetle of the family Coccinellidae. It is found in New Caledonia.

== Description ==
Adults reach a length of about 2.66–2.77 mm (0.105–0.109 in). They have a broadly oval, moderately convex body. They are mostly blackish or deep black, with the antennae light brown. The pubescence on the dorsum consists of appresed setae and darker, long stiff bristles. The pubescence forms a wavy pattern on the elytra.

== Etymology ==
The species is dedicated to Dr. Marek Wanat, a Polish entomologist and the collector of the type series.
