= Rhyzobius unicolor =

Scientific classification
- Kingdom: Animalia
- Phylum: Arthropoda
- Clade: Pancrustacea
- Class: Insecta
- Order: Coleoptera
- Suborder: Polyphaga
- Infraorder: Cucujiformia
- Family: Coccinellidae
- Genus: Rhyzobius
- Species: R. unicolor

Binomial name
- Rhyzobius unicolor Tomaszewska, 2010

Species of beetle

Rhyzobius unicolor is a species of beetle of the family Coccinellidae. It is found in Australia (Western Australia).

== Description ==
Adults reach a length of about 2.17–2.33 mm (0.085–0.092 in). They have a broadly oval, moderately convex body. They are light brown or yellowish brown. The pubescence on the dorsum consists of appresed setae and darker stiff bristles, forming a wavy pattern on the elytra.

== Etymology ==
The name of the species refers to its uniformly coloured body.
