= Rhyzobius bipartitus =

Scientific classification
- Kingdom: Animalia
- Phylum: Arthropoda
- Clade: Pancrustacea
- Class: Insecta
- Order: Coleoptera
- Suborder: Polyphaga
- Infraorder: Cucujiformia
- Family: Coccinellidae
- Genus: Rhyzobius
- Species: R. bipartitus

Binomial name
- Rhyzobius bipartitus Fuente, 1918

Synonyms
- Rhizobius bassus Normand, 1938; Rhyzobius bassus

Species of beetle

Rhyzobius bipartitus is a species of beetle of the family Coccinellidae. It is found in Spain and France (the eastern Pyrenees).

== Description ==
Adults reach a length of about 2.6–2.9 mm (0.10–0.11 in). They have an elongate oval, moderately convex, dark brown to chestnut brown body. Each elytron has a large, infuscate area. The dorsum is covered with pubescence consisting of appresed setae and dark stiff bristles, which are only found along the margins on the elytra.
