= Rhyzobius macromaculatus =

Scientific classification
- Kingdom: Animalia
- Phylum: Arthropoda
- Clade: Pancrustacea
- Class: Insecta
- Order: Coleoptera
- Suborder: Polyphaga
- Infraorder: Cucujiformia
- Family: Coccinellidae
- Genus: Rhyzobius
- Species: R. macromaculatus

Binomial name
- Rhyzobius macromaculatus Tomaszewska, 2010

Species of beetle

Rhyzobius macromaculatus is a species of beetle of the family Coccinellidae. It is found in Australia (Queensland).

== Description ==
Adults reach a length of about 1.95–2.4 mm (0.077–0.094 in). They have an elongate oval, moderately convex body. They are bicoloured. The pubescence on the dorsum consists of appresed setae and dark stiff bristles along the margins. The dorsal pubescence forms a wavy pattern on the elytra.

== Etymology ==
The species name refers to the large, pale macula on both elytra.
