= Rhyzobius amabilis =

Scientific classification
- Kingdom: Animalia
- Phylum: Arthropoda
- Clade: Pancrustacea
- Class: Insecta
- Order: Coleoptera
- Suborder: Polyphaga
- Infraorder: Cucujiformia
- Family: Coccinellidae
- Genus: Rhyzobius
- Species: R. amabilis

Binomial name
- Rhyzobius amabilis Weise, 1918

Species of beetle

Rhyzobius amabilis is a species of beetle of the family Coccinellidae. It is found in Indonesia (Western New Guinea).

== Description ==
Adults reach a length of about 3.1–3.45 mm (0.122–0.136 in). They have a broadly oval, strongly convex body. The dorsum is brownish black or black and the elytra have a bluish or purple metallic sheen. The antennae and legs are dark brown. The dorsum has moderately long pubescence, forming a wavy pattern on the elytra.
