= Rhyzobius weiri =

Scientific classification
- Kingdom: Animalia
- Phylum: Arthropoda
- Clade: Pancrustacea
- Class: Insecta
- Order: Coleoptera
- Suborder: Polyphaga
- Infraorder: Cucujiformia
- Family: Coccinellidae
- Genus: Rhyzobius
- Species: R. weiri

Binomial name
- Rhyzobius weiri Tomaszewska, 2010

Species of beetle

Rhyzobius weiri is a species of beetle of the family Coccinellidae. It is found in Australia (Queensland).

== Description ==
Adults reach a length of about 1.83–2 mm (0.072–0.079 in). They have a broadly oval, strongly convex body. The dorsal surface is blackish brown and each elytron has a reddish brown stripe and a blackish spot. The ventral surface is dark brown and the antennae and legs are yellowish brown. The pubescence on the dorsum consists of appresed setae and darker stiff bristles, forming a wavy pattern on the elytra.

== Etymology ==
This species is dedicated to ANIC curator Tom Weir.
