= Rhyzobius sumatrensis =

Scientific classification
- Kingdom: Animalia
- Phylum: Arthropoda
- Clade: Pancrustacea
- Class: Insecta
- Order: Coleoptera
- Suborder: Polyphaga
- Infraorder: Cucujiformia
- Family: Coccinellidae
- Genus: Rhyzobius
- Species: R. sumatrensis

Binomial name
- Rhyzobius sumatrensis Tomaszewska, 2010

Species of beetle

Rhyzobius sumatrensis is a species of beetle of the family Coccinellidae. It is found in Indonesia (Sumatra).

== Description ==
Adults reach a length of about 2.77 mm (0.109 in). They have a broadly oval, strongly convex body. They are mostly black, while the antennae are yellowish brown. The dorsum has moderately long pubescence.

== Etymology ==
The species is named after the island of its origin.
