= Rhyzobius popei =

Scientific classification
- Kingdom: Animalia
- Phylum: Arthropoda
- Clade: Pancrustacea
- Class: Insecta
- Order: Coleoptera
- Suborder: Polyphaga
- Infraorder: Cucujiformia
- Family: Coccinellidae
- Genus: Rhyzobius
- Species: R. popei

Binomial name
- Rhyzobius popei Tomaszewska, 2010

Species of beetle

Rhyzobius popei is a species of beetle of the family Coccinellidae. It is found in Australia (Australian Capital Territory).

== Description ==
Adults reach a length of about 2.85–3.95 mm (0.112–0.156 in). They have an elongate oval, moderately convex body. They are black, with the antennae yellowish brown. The pubescence of the dorsum consists of appresed setae and darker stiff bristles along the margins. The pubescence forms a wavy pattern on the elytra.

== Etymology ==
The species is dedicated to Robert D. Pope, who spend much time studying ladybird beetles.
