= Rhyzobius pulchellus =

Scientific classification
- Kingdom: Animalia
- Phylum: Arthropoda
- Clade: Pancrustacea
- Class: Insecta
- Order: Coleoptera
- Suborder: Polyphaga
- Infraorder: Cucujiformia
- Family: Coccinellidae
- Genus: Rhyzobius
- Species: R. pulchellus

Binomial name
- Rhyzobius pulchellus (Montrouzier, 1861)

Synonyms
- Epilachna pulchella Montrouzier, 1861; Rhizobius lindi Blackburn, 1889; Rhizobius coerulens Blackburn, 1892; Rhizobius submetallica Crotch, 1874; Rhizobius coeruleus Blackburn, 1892; Rhizobius debilis Blackburn, 1889

Species of beetle

Rhyzobius pulchellus is a species of beetle of the family Coccinellidae. It is found in Australia (Queensland, New South Wales, Australian Capital Territory, Victoria, South Australia, Western Australia, Northern Territory, Tasmania) and New Caledonia.

== Description ==
Adults reach a length of about 2–3.10 mm (0.079–0.122 in). They have a broadly oval, moderately convex body. They are brown, or dark brown to blackish brown, with the dorsal surface often somewhat infuscate. The elytra often have a small blackish spot. The antennae are often paler than the rest of the body. The pubescence on the dorsum consists of appresed setae and darker stiff bristles, especially along the margins. The pubescence forms a wavy pattern on the elytra.
