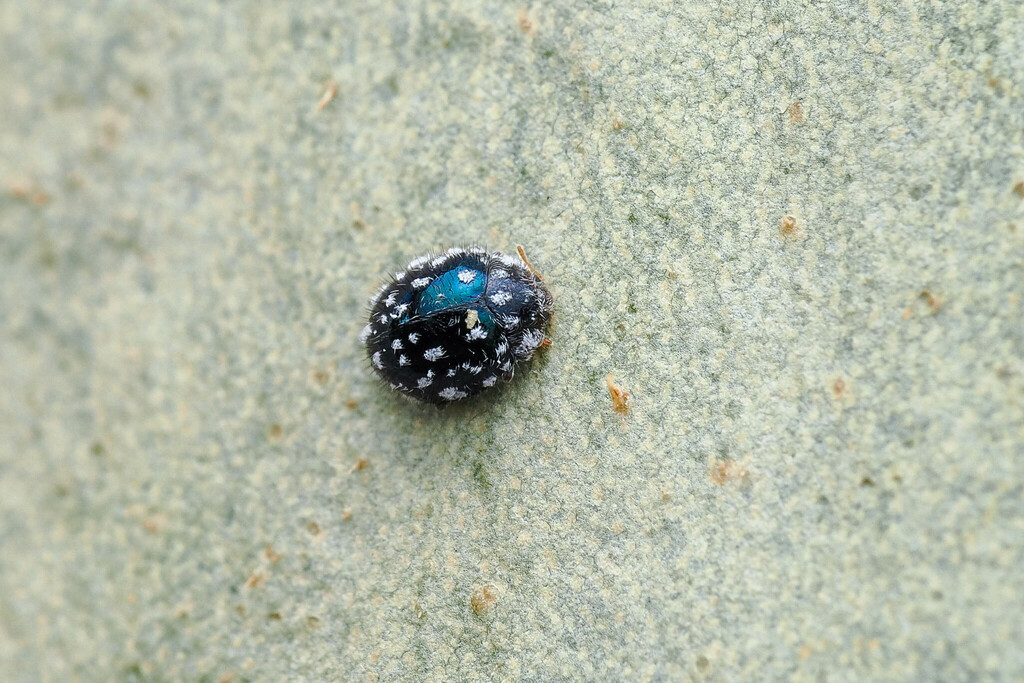

Scientific classification
- Kingdom: Animalia
- Phylum: Arthropoda
- Clade: Pancrustacea
- Class: Insecta
- Order: Coleoptera
- Suborder: Polyphaga
- Infraorder: Cucujiformia
- Family: Coccinellidae
- Genus: Rhyzobius
- Species: R. fasciculatus

Binomial name
- Rhyzobius fasciculatus Blackburn, 1892

= Rhyzobius fasciculatus =

Species of beetle

Rhyzobius fasciculatus is a species of beetle of the family Coccinellidae. It is found in Australia (Queensland, New South Wales).

== Description ==
Adults reach a length of about 2.2–2.3 mm (0.087–0.091 in). They have a broadly oval, strongly convex body. They are black, with the anterior angles of the pronotum usually pale. The antennae are yellowish brown. The pubescence of the dorsum consists of appresed setae and moderately dense dark stiff bristles. The pubescence forms a whorled pattern on the elytra.
