= Rhyzobius aurantii =

Scientific classification
- Kingdom: Animalia
- Phylum: Arthropoda
- Clade: Pancrustacea
- Class: Insecta
- Order: Coleoptera
- Suborder: Polyphaga
- Infraorder: Cucujiformia
- Family: Coccinellidae
- Genus: Rhyzobius
- Species: R. aurantii

Binomial name
- Rhyzobius aurantii Blackburn, 1892

Synonyms
- Rhizobius vulgaris Weise, 1923

Species of beetle

Rhyzobius aurantii is a species of beetle of the family Coccinellidae. It is found in Australia (Queensland, New South Wales, Australian Capital Territory, Victoria, Tasmania).

== Description ==
Adults reach a length of about 2.43–2.8 mm (0.096–0.110 in). They have an elongate oval, flattened body. The dorsal surface is black, with the lateral and apical margins of the elytra and lateral and anterior margins of the pronotum brown. The ventral surface is dark chestnut brown and the antennae and legs are yellowish brown. There is moderately long pubescence on the dorsum, forming a wavy pattern on the elytra.
