= Rhyzobius nitidus =

Scientific classification
- Kingdom: Animalia
- Phylum: Arthropoda
- Clade: Pancrustacea
- Class: Insecta
- Order: Coleoptera
- Suborder: Polyphaga
- Infraorder: Cucujiformia
- Family: Coccinellidae
- Genus: Rhyzobius
- Species: R. nitidus

Binomial name
- Rhyzobius nitidus Blackburn, 1889

Synonyms
- Rhizobius plebeius Blackburn, 1892

Species of beetle

Rhyzobius nitidus is a species of beetle of the family Coccinellidae. It is found in Australia (New South Wales, Australian Capital Territory, Victoria, South Australia).

== Description ==
Adults reach a length of about 1.75–2.07 mm (0.069–0.081 in). They have an elongate oval, moderately convex body. They are reddish brown, with the antennae sometimes paler. The dorsum has moderately long pubescence, forming a wavy pattern on the elytra.
