= Rhyzobius decoratus =

Scientific classification
- Kingdom: Animalia
- Phylum: Arthropoda
- Clade: Pancrustacea
- Class: Insecta
- Order: Coleoptera
- Suborder: Polyphaga
- Infraorder: Cucujiformia
- Family: Coccinellidae
- Genus: Rhyzobius
- Species: R. decoratus

Binomial name
- Rhyzobius decoratus Weise, 1905

Synonyms
- Rhizobiellus natalensis Pope, 1957; Rhizobius caffer Weise, 1913

Species of beetle

Rhyzobius decoratus is a species of beetle of the family Coccinellidae. It is found in South Africa (Gauteng, Orange Free State, KwaZulu-Natal, Eastern Cape).

== Description ==
Adults reach a length of about 2.85–4.3 mm (0.112–0.169 in). They have an elongate oval, flattened body. They are mostly dark brown or chestnut brown with a black pattern on the elytra. There is moderately long pubescence on the dorsum.
