= Rhyzobius nigromarginatus =

Scientific classification
- Kingdom: Animalia
- Phylum: Arthropoda
- Clade: Pancrustacea
- Class: Insecta
- Order: Coleoptera
- Suborder: Polyphaga
- Infraorder: Cucujiformia
- Family: Coccinellidae
- Genus: Rhyzobius
- Species: R. nigromarginatus

Binomial name
- Rhyzobius nigromarginatus Fürsch, 1992

Species of beetle

Rhyzobius nigromarginatus is a species of beetle of the family Coccinellidae. It is found in South Africa (Eastern Cape).

== Description ==
Adults reach a length of about 2.17–2.43 mm (0.085–0.096 in). They have a broadly oval, moderately convex body. They are brown with elytra black along the lateral margins. The pubescence on the dorsum consists of appresed setae and dark stiff bristles.
