= Rhyzobius speculifer =

Scientific classification
- Kingdom: Animalia
- Phylum: Arthropoda
- Clade: Pancrustacea
- Class: Insecta
- Order: Coleoptera
- Suborder: Polyphaga
- Infraorder: Cucujiformia
- Family: Coccinellidae
- Genus: Rhyzobius
- Species: R. speculifer

Binomial name
- Rhyzobius speculifer Blackburn, 1892

Species of beetle

Rhyzobius speculifer is a species of beetle of the family Coccinellidae. It is found in Australia (Queensland, New South Wales).

== Description ==
Adults reach a length of about 2.5–3 mm (0.098–0.118 in). They have a broadly oval, strongly convex body. They are mostly dark brown, often with the antennae and part of the legs light brown. The pubescence on the dorsum consists of appresed setae and darker stiff bristles, forming a wavy pattern on the elytra.
