= Rhyzobius reidi =

Scientific classification
- Kingdom: Animalia
- Phylum: Arthropoda
- Clade: Pancrustacea
- Class: Insecta
- Order: Coleoptera
- Suborder: Polyphaga
- Infraorder: Cucujiformia
- Family: Coccinellidae
- Genus: Rhyzobius
- Species: R. reidi

Binomial name
- Rhyzobius reidi Tomaszewska, 2010

Species of beetle

Rhyzobius reidi is a species of beetle of the family Coccinellidae. It is found in Australia (Queensland).

== Description ==
Adults reach a length of about 1.97–2.35 mm (0.078–0.093 in). They have a broadly oval, strongly convex body. The dorsal surface is blackish brown or black, the elytra with reddish brown spots. The ventral surface is dark brown and the antennae and legs are yellowish brown. The pubescence on the dorsum consists of appresed setae and stiff bristles, forming a wavy pattern on the elytra.

== Etymology ==
The species is dedicated to Dr. Chris Reid, who collected most of the type series.
