= Rhyzobius densepunctatus =

Scientific classification
- Kingdom: Animalia
- Phylum: Arthropoda
- Clade: Pancrustacea
- Class: Insecta
- Order: Coleoptera
- Suborder: Polyphaga
- Infraorder: Cucujiformia
- Family: Coccinellidae
- Genus: Rhyzobius
- Species: R. densepunctatus

Binomial name
- Rhyzobius densepunctatus (Pope, 1957)

Synonyms
- Rhyzobiellus densepunctatus Pope, 1957

Species of beetle

Rhyzobius densepunctatus is a species of beetle of the family Coccinellidae. It is found in South Africa (Western Cape).

== Description ==
Adults reach a length of about 2.4–2.73 mm (0.094–0.107 in). They have an elongate oval, flattened body. The dorsum is light brown, while the ventral surface is dark brown. There is moderately long pubescence on the dorsum.
