= Rhyzobius occidentalis =

Scientific classification
- Kingdom: Animalia
- Phylum: Arthropoda
- Clade: Pancrustacea
- Class: Insecta
- Order: Coleoptera
- Suborder: Polyphaga
- Infraorder: Cucujiformia
- Family: Coccinellidae
- Genus: Rhyzobius
- Species: R. occidentalis

Binomial name
- Rhyzobius occidentalis Blackburn, 1889

Species of beetle

Rhyzobius occidentalis is a species of beetle of the family Coccinellidae. It is found in Australia (Western Australia).

== Description ==
Adults reach a length of about 1.9–2.05 mm (0.075–0.081 in). They have an elongate oval, moderately convex body. They are mostly yellow, but with the disc of the pronotum and ventral surface infuscate. There is often a brownish band on the elytra, as well as three spots. The pubescence on the dorsum consists of appresed setae and darker stiff bristles along the margins. The pubescence forms a wavy pattern on the elytra.
