= Rhyzobius calderi =

Scientific classification
- Kingdom: Animalia
- Phylum: Arthropoda
- Clade: Pancrustacea
- Class: Insecta
- Order: Coleoptera
- Suborder: Polyphaga
- Infraorder: Cucujiformia
- Family: Coccinellidae
- Genus: Rhyzobius
- Species: R. calderi

Binomial name
- Rhyzobius calderi Tomaszewska, 2010

Species of beetle

Rhyzobius calderi is a species of beetle of the family Coccinellidae. It is found in Australia (New South Wales).

== Description ==
Adults reach a length of about 2.33–2.83 mm (0.092–0.111 in). They have a broadly oval, moderately convex body. The head, pronotum (except for the pale yellow lateral and anterior margins) and the lateral and apical margins of the elytra are blackish brown or black. The rest of the surface of the elytra is reddish brown. The ventral surface is infuscate. The antennae are yellow. The dorsum is covered with moderately long pubescence.

== Etymology ==
The species is named after Dr. Andrew Calder, who collected the holotype specimen.
