= Rhyzobius gosfordensis =

Scientific classification
- Kingdom: Animalia
- Phylum: Arthropoda
- Clade: Pancrustacea
- Class: Insecta
- Order: Coleoptera
- Suborder: Polyphaga
- Infraorder: Cucujiformia
- Family: Coccinellidae
- Genus: Rhyzobius
- Species: R. gosfordensis

Binomial name
- Rhyzobius gosfordensis Blackburn, 1895

Species of beetle

Rhyzobius gosfordensis is a species of beetle of the family Coccinellidae. It is found in Australia (New South Wales, Australian Capital Territory, Victoria).

== Description ==
Adults reach a length of about 3–3.75 mm (0.118–0.148 in). They have an elongate oval, moderately convex body. The dorsal surface is dark chestnut brown, with the ventral surface usually paler dark brown or dark orange brown. The antennae are usually light brown. The pubescence on the dorsum consists of appresed setae and darker stiff bristles, forming a wavy pattern on the elytra.
