= Rhyzobius indicus =

Scientific classification
- Kingdom: Animalia
- Phylum: Arthropoda
- Clade: Pancrustacea
- Class: Insecta
- Order: Coleoptera
- Suborder: Polyphaga
- Infraorder: Cucujiformia
- Family: Coccinellidae
- Genus: Rhyzobius
- Species: R. indicus

Binomial name
- Rhyzobius indicus Tomaszewska, 2010

Species of beetle

Rhyzobius indicus is a species of beetle of the family Coccinellidae. It is found in India (West Bengal).

== Description ==
Adults reach a length of about 2.67 mm (0.105 in). They have a broadly oval, strongly convex, black body and brown antennae. The elytra have a blue metallic sheen. The pubescence on the dorsum consists of appresed setae and dark stiff bristles.

== Etymology ==
The species is named after its country of origin.
