= Rhyzobius bipunctatus =

Scientific classification
- Kingdom: Animalia
- Phylum: Arthropoda
- Clade: Pancrustacea
- Class: Insecta
- Order: Coleoptera
- Suborder: Polyphaga
- Infraorder: Cucujiformia
- Family: Coccinellidae
- Genus: Rhyzobius
- Species: R. bipunctatus

Binomial name
- Rhyzobius bipunctatus Tomaszewska, 2010

Species of beetle

Rhyzobius bipunctatus is a species of beetle of the family Coccinellidae. It is found in Indonesia (Irian Jaya).

== Description ==
Adults reach a length of about 2.07–2.38 mm (0.081–0.094 in). They have an elongate oval, moderately convex body. They are mostly black, each elytron with a small yellow spot. The pubescence on the dorsum consists of short appressed setae and some darker stiff bristles along the margins. The pubescence forms a wavy pattern on the elytra.

== Etymology ==
The name of the species refers to two pale spots on the elytra.
