= Rhyzobius hirtellus =

Scientific classification
- Kingdom: Animalia
- Phylum: Arthropoda
- Clade: Pancrustacea
- Class: Insecta
- Order: Coleoptera
- Suborder: Polyphaga
- Infraorder: Cucujiformia
- Family: Coccinellidae
- Genus: Rhyzobius
- Species: R. hirtellus

Binomial name
- Rhyzobius hirtellus Crotch, 1874

Synonyms
- Rhizobius ruficollis Blackburn, 1889

Species of beetle

Rhyzobius hirtellus is a species of beetle of the family Coccinellidae. It is found in Australia (Tasmania, Western Australia, South Australia, Victoria, Australian Capital Territory, New South Wales).

== Description ==
Adults reach a length of about 2.33–3.15 mm (0.092–0.124 in). They have an elongate oval, moderately convex body. The head, pronotum and legs are light brown to dark brown, while the elytra and most of the ventral surface are dark chestnut brown to almost black. The pronotum often has a blackish stripe along the middle. The pubescence on the dorsum consists of appresed setae and dark stiff bristles, forming a wavy pattern on the elytra.
