= Rhyzobius leucochaetus =

Scientific classification
- Kingdom: Animalia
- Phylum: Arthropoda
- Clade: Pancrustacea
- Class: Insecta
- Order: Coleoptera
- Suborder: Polyphaga
- Infraorder: Cucujiformia
- Family: Coccinellidae
- Genus: Rhyzobius
- Species: R. leucochaetus

Binomial name
- Rhyzobius leucochaetus Tomaszewska, 2010

Species of beetle

Rhyzobius leucochaetus is a species of beetle of the family Coccinellidae. It is found in Indonesia (Irian Jaya).

== Description ==
Adults reach a length of about 3.25–3.65 mm (0.128–0.144 in). They have a broadly oval, strongly convex body. They are mostly black, while the head, sides of the pronotum, antennae and most of the legs are orange brown. The dorsum has moderately long appresed setae and stiff bristles along the margins.

== Etymology ==
The species name is derived from Greek and means white-haired, referring to the white hairs covering the dorsum.
