= Rhyzobius papuensis =

Scientific classification
- Kingdom: Animalia
- Phylum: Arthropoda
- Clade: Pancrustacea
- Class: Insecta
- Order: Coleoptera
- Suborder: Polyphaga
- Infraorder: Cucujiformia
- Family: Coccinellidae
- Genus: Rhyzobius
- Species: R. papuensis

Binomial name
- Rhyzobius papuensis Tomaszewska, 2010

Species of beetle

Rhyzobius papuensis is a species of beetle of the family Coccinellidae. It is found in Papua New Guinea.

== Description ==
Adults reach a length of about 2.15–3 mm (0.085–0.118 in). They have a broadly oval, strongly convex body. The dorsal surface is brownish black or black with a blue metallic sheen on the elytra. The antennae are brown. The dorsum has moderately long and pubescence, forming a wavy pattern on the elytra.

== Etymology ==
The species name refers to country of its origin.
