= Rhyzobius bilineatus =

Scientific classification
- Kingdom: Animalia
- Phylum: Arthropoda
- Clade: Pancrustacea
- Class: Insecta
- Order: Coleoptera
- Suborder: Polyphaga
- Infraorder: Cucujiformia
- Family: Coccinellidae
- Genus: Rhyzobius
- Species: R. bilineatus

Binomial name
- Rhyzobius bilineatus Weise, 1923

Species of beetle

Rhyzobius bilineatus is a species of beetle of the family Coccinellidae. It is found in Australia (Queensland).

== Description ==
Adults reach a length of about 1.8–1.83 mm (0.071–0.072 in). They have an elongate oval, flattened body. The dorsal surface is red brown, with the lateral margins of the pronotum and a stripe on the disc of each elytron golden brown. The ventral surface is mostly dark brown, with the legs golden brown. There is moderately long and pubescence on the dorsum.
