= Rhyzobius josephi =

Scientific classification
- Kingdom: Animalia
- Phylum: Arthropoda
- Clade: Pancrustacea
- Class: Insecta
- Order: Coleoptera
- Suborder: Polyphaga
- Infraorder: Cucujiformia
- Family: Coccinellidae
- Genus: Rhyzobius
- Species: R. josephi

Binomial name
- Rhyzobius josephi Tomaszewska, 2010

Species of beetle

Rhyzobius josephi is a species of beetle of the family Coccinellidae. It is found in Australia (Tasmania).

== Description ==
Adults reach a length of about 3.15–3.8 mm (0.124–0.150 in). They have an elongate oval, moderately convex body. The dorsal surface is dark brown or dark chestnut brown and the ventral surface is dark brown. The antennae are sometimes pale. The pubescence on the dorsum consists of appresed setae and darker stiff bristles, forming a wavy pattern on the elytra.

== Etymology ==
The species is dedicated to American coleopterist Dr. Joseph V. McHugh.
