= Rhyzobius quadrifenestratus =

Scientific classification
- Kingdom: Animalia
- Phylum: Arthropoda
- Clade: Pancrustacea
- Class: Insecta
- Order: Coleoptera
- Suborder: Polyphaga
- Infraorder: Cucujiformia
- Family: Coccinellidae
- Genus: Rhyzobius
- Species: R. quadrifenestratus

Binomial name
- Rhyzobius quadrifenestratus Fürsch, 1992

Species of beetle

Rhyzobius quadrifenestratus is a species of beetle of the family Coccinellidae. It is found in South Africa (Eastern Cape).

== Description ==
Adults reach a length of about 2.33–2.73 mm (0.092–0.107 in). They have a broadly oval, moderately convex body. They are yellowish brown with the elytra dark brown along the disc. There are two yellowish brown spots within this dark area. The pubescence on the dorsum consists of appresed setae and some stiff bristles.
