= Rhyzobius breweri =

Scientific classification
- Kingdom: Animalia
- Phylum: Arthropoda
- Clade: Pancrustacea
- Class: Insecta
- Order: Coleoptera
- Suborder: Polyphaga
- Infraorder: Cucujiformia
- Family: Coccinellidae
- Genus: Rhyzobius
- Species: R. breweri

Binomial name
- Rhyzobius breweri Crotch, 1874

Synonyms
- Rhizobius corticalis Lea, 1902

Species of beetle

Rhyzobius breweri is a species of beetle of the family Coccinellidae. It is found in Australia (Western Australia).

== Description ==
Adults reach a length of about 3.3–4.25 mm (0.130–0.167 in). They have an elongate oval, strongly convex body. They are chestnut brown to dark chestnut brown, but the antennae are sometimes yellowish brown. The pubescence on the dorsum consists of appresed setae and dark stiff bristles, and forms a wavy pattern on the elytra.
