= Rhyzobius evansii =

Scientific classification
- Kingdom: Animalia
- Phylum: Arthropoda
- Clade: Pancrustacea
- Class: Insecta
- Order: Coleoptera
- Suborder: Polyphaga
- Infraorder: Cucujiformia
- Family: Coccinellidae
- Genus: Rhyzobius
- Species: R. evansii

Binomial name
- Rhyzobius evansii Mulsant, 1850

Synonyms
- Rhizobius confinis Lea, 1902

Species of beetle

Rhyzobius evansii is a species of beetle of the family Coccinellidae. It is found in Australia (Western Australia, South Australia, Victoria).

== Description ==
Adults reach a length of about 3–4.25 mm (0.118–0.167 in). They have an elongate oval, moderately convex body. They are dark chestnut brown, with the lateral and apical margins of the elytra and the lateral and anterior margins of the pronotum sometimes paler. The antennae are usually pale brown. The pubescence on the dorsum consists of appresed setae and stiff bristles and forms a wavy pattern on the elytra.
