= Rhyzobius insipidus =

Scientific classification
- Kingdom: Animalia
- Phylum: Arthropoda
- Clade: Pancrustacea
- Class: Insecta
- Order: Coleoptera
- Suborder: Polyphaga
- Infraorder: Cucujiformia
- Family: Coccinellidae
- Genus: Rhyzobius
- Species: R. insipidus

Binomial name
- Rhyzobius insipidus Blackburn, 1889

Species of beetle

Rhyzobius insipidus is a species of beetle of the family Coccinellidae. It is found in Australia (South Australia).

== Description ==
Adults reach a length of about 2.6–2.7 mm (0.10–0.11 in). They have an elongate oval, moderately convex body. They are mostly light brown, while some ventral surfaces are dark brown. The pubescence on the dorsum consists of appresed setae and darker stiff bristles, forming a wavy pattern on the elytra.
