= Rhyzobius gordoni =

Scientific classification
- Kingdom: Animalia
- Phylum: Arthropoda
- Clade: Pancrustacea
- Class: Insecta
- Order: Coleoptera
- Suborder: Polyphaga
- Infraorder: Cucujiformia
- Family: Coccinellidae
- Genus: Rhyzobius
- Species: R. gordoni

Binomial name
- Rhyzobius gordoni Tomaszewska, 2010

Species of beetle

Rhyzobius gordoni is a species of beetle of the family Coccinellidae. It is found in Australia (New South Wales, Australian Capital Territory, Queensland).

== Description ==
Adults reach a length of about 3.6–4.55 mm (0.142–0.179 in). They have an elongate oval, moderately convex body. They are chestnut brown to blackish, with the head, pronotum (anteriorly and laterally) and apical and lateral margins of the elytra usually paler. The ventral surface is reddish brown. The pubescence on the dorsum consists of appresed setae and slightly darker stiff bristles, and forms a wavy pattern on the elytra.

== Etymology ==
The species is dedicated to American coccinellid specialist Dr. Robert Gordon.
