= Rhyzobius lineellus =

Scientific classification
- Kingdom: Animalia
- Phylum: Arthropoda
- Clade: Pancrustacea
- Class: Insecta
- Order: Coleoptera
- Suborder: Polyphaga
- Infraorder: Cucujiformia
- Family: Coccinellidae
- Genus: Rhyzobius
- Species: R. lineellus

Binomial name
- Rhyzobius lineellus Tomaszewska, 2010

Species of beetle

Rhyzobius lineellus is a species of beetle of the family Coccinellidae. It is found in Australia (South Australia, Tasmania, Australian Capital Territory).

== Description ==
Adults reach a length of about 1.8–2 mm (0.071–0.079 in). They have an elongate oval, moderately convex body. They are blackish brown, with some light brown areas on the elytra and a long red stripe along the disc of the elytra. The dorsum has moderately long pubescence, forming a wavy pattern on the elytra.

== Etymology ==
The species name refers to the long pale stripe on the disc of each elytron.
