= Rhyzobius quadrimaculatus =

Scientific classification
- Kingdom: Animalia
- Phylum: Arthropoda
- Clade: Pancrustacea
- Class: Insecta
- Order: Coleoptera
- Suborder: Polyphaga
- Infraorder: Cucujiformia
- Family: Coccinellidae
- Genus: Rhyzobius
- Species: R. quadrimaculatus

Binomial name
- Rhyzobius quadrimaculatus Tomaszewska, 2010

Species of beetle

Rhyzobius quadrimaculatus is a species of beetle of the family Coccinellidae. It is found in Australia (Tasmania).

== Description ==
Adults reach a length of about 1.63–1.83 mm (0.064–0.072 in). They have an elongate and almost parallel-sided, moderately convex body. They are blackish brown or black, the elytra with light brown spots on the disc. The dorsum has short pubescence.

== Etymology ==
The species name refers to the four pale maculae on each elytron.
