= Rhyzobius alphabeticus =

Scientific classification
- Kingdom: Animalia
- Phylum: Arthropoda
- Clade: Pancrustacea
- Class: Insecta
- Order: Coleoptera
- Suborder: Polyphaga
- Infraorder: Cucujiformia
- Family: Coccinellidae
- Genus: Rhyzobius
- Species: R. alphabeticus

Binomial name
- Rhyzobius alphabeticus Lea, 1902

Species of beetle

Rhyzobius alphabeticus is a species of beetle of the family Coccinellidae. It is found in Australia (Tasmania, Victoria, New South Wales).

== Description ==
Adults reach a length of about 2.05–2.25 mm (0.081–0.089 in). They have an elongate oval, flattened body. The dorsum is mostly yellowish brown to dark brown, but the elytra are reddish or yellowish with a dark brown or black pattern. The ventral surface is dark brown with the legs light brown. The pubescence on the dorsum consists of appresed setae and darker stiff bristles.
