= Rhyzobius bielawskii =

Scientific classification
- Kingdom: Animalia
- Phylum: Arthropoda
- Clade: Pancrustacea
- Class: Insecta
- Order: Coleoptera
- Suborder: Polyphaga
- Infraorder: Cucujiformia
- Family: Coccinellidae
- Genus: Rhyzobius
- Species: R. bielawskii

Binomial name
- Rhyzobius bielawskii Tomaszewska, 2010

Species of beetle

Rhyzobius bielawskii is a species of beetle of the family Coccinellidae. It is found in New Caledonia.

== Description ==
Adults reach a length of about 1.58–1.9 mm (0.062–0.075 in). They have an elongate oval, moderately convex body. They are brown to dark brown, with the legs and antennae paler. The elytra are often infuscate to almost black and sometimes have an oval area of the same colour as the pronotum. The pubescence on the dorsum consists of appresed setae and darker stiff bristles.

== Etymology ==
The species is dedicated to the Polish entomologist Dr. Ryszard Bielawski.
