= Rhyzobius secessus =

Scientific classification
- Kingdom: Animalia
- Phylum: Arthropoda
- Clade: Pancrustacea
- Class: Insecta
- Order: Coleoptera
- Suborder: Polyphaga
- Infraorder: Cucujiformia
- Family: Coccinellidae
- Genus: Rhyzobius
- Species: R. secessus

Binomial name
- Rhyzobius secessus Blackburn, 1896

Species of beetle

Rhyzobius secessus is a species of beetle of the family Coccinellidae. It is found in Australia (Victoria).

== Description ==
Adults reach a length of about 3.1–3.15 mm (0.122–0.124 in). They have a broadly oval, moderately convex body. They are mostly light brown, with the lateral margins of the pronotum and lateral margins of the elytra a bit lighter. The pubescence on the dorsum consists of appresed setae and darker stiff bristles, forming a wavy pattern on the elytra.
