= Rhyzobius pelion =

Scientific classification
- Kingdom: Animalia
- Phylum: Arthropoda
- Clade: Pancrustacea
- Class: Insecta
- Order: Coleoptera
- Suborder: Polyphaga
- Infraorder: Cucujiformia
- Family: Coccinellidae
- Genus: Rhyzobius
- Species: R. pelion

Binomial name
- Rhyzobius pelion Tomaszewska, 2010

Species of beetle

Rhyzobius pelion is a species of beetle of the family Coccinellidae. It is found in Australia (Tasmania).

== Description ==
Adults reach a length of about 2.15–2.5 mm (0.085–0.098 in). They have an elongate and almost parallel-sided, brownish black body. The antennae are yellowish brown or reddish brown. The dorsum is covered with appresed setae and some bristles along the margins. The pubescence on the elytra forms a distinct pattern due to almost impunctate and glabrous patches.

== Etymology ==
The name of the species refers to Pelion Hut, the locality where the holotype was collected.
