= Rhyzobius angolensis =

Scientific classification
- Kingdom: Animalia
- Phylum: Arthropoda
- Clade: Pancrustacea
- Class: Insecta
- Order: Coleoptera
- Suborder: Polyphaga
- Infraorder: Cucujiformia
- Family: Coccinellidae
- Genus: Rhyzobius
- Species: R. angolensis

Binomial name
- Rhyzobius angolensis Fürsch, 1992

Species of beetle

Rhyzobius angolensis is a species of beetle of the family Coccinellidae. It is found in Angola.

== Description ==
Adults reach a length of about 2.6 mm (0.10 in). They have an broadly oval, moderately convex body. They are yellowish brown with dark brown elytra, each elytron with two yellowish brown maculae. There are two types of pubescence on the dorsum: appresed setae and dark, stiff bristles.
