= Rhyzobius viridipennis =

Scientific classification
- Kingdom: Animalia
- Phylum: Arthropoda
- Clade: Pancrustacea
- Class: Insecta
- Order: Coleoptera
- Suborder: Polyphaga
- Infraorder: Cucujiformia
- Family: Coccinellidae
- Genus: Rhyzobius
- Species: R. viridipennis

Binomial name
- Rhyzobius viridipennis Lea, 1929

Species of beetle

Rhyzobius viridipennis is a species of beetle of the family Coccinellidae. It is found in Australia (Lord Howe Island).

== Description ==
Adults reach a length of about 2.4–2.6 mm (0.094–0.102 in). They have a broadly oval, moderately convex body. The head and pronotum are chestnut brown, while the disc of the pronotum is somewhat infuscate. The elytra are brownish black or black. The antennae and legs are yellowish brown to red brown. The pubescence on the dorsum consists of appresed setae and darker stiff bristles, forming a wavy pattern on the elytra.
