= Rhyzobius bicolor =

Scientific classification
- Kingdom: Animalia
- Phylum: Arthropoda
- Clade: Pancrustacea
- Class: Insecta
- Order: Coleoptera
- Suborder: Polyphaga
- Infraorder: Cucujiformia
- Family: Coccinellidae
- Genus: Rhyzobius
- Species: R. bicolor

Binomial name
- Rhyzobius bicolor Fürsch, 1992

Species of beetle

Rhyzobius bicolor is a species of beetle of the family Coccinellidae. It is found in South Africa (Western Cape).

== Description ==
Adults reach a length of about 3–3.17 mm (0.118–0.125 in). They have an elongate oval, flattened body. The head, pronotum and legs are light brown, while the elytra are black. The dorsum has moderately long pubescence.
