= Rhyzobius jaya =

Scientific classification
- Kingdom: Animalia
- Phylum: Arthropoda
- Clade: Pancrustacea
- Class: Insecta
- Order: Coleoptera
- Suborder: Polyphaga
- Infraorder: Cucujiformia
- Family: Coccinellidae
- Genus: Rhyzobius
- Species: R. jaya

Binomial name
- Rhyzobius jaya Tomaszewska, 2010

Species of beetle

Rhyzobius jaya is a species of beetle of the family Coccinellidae. It is found in Indonesia (Irian Jaya).

== Description ==
Adults reach a length of about 2.77–3.23 mm (0.109–0.127 in). They have an elongate oval, moderately convex body. They are mostly black, but most of the pronotum, apex of the elytra, and most of the antennae are yellowish. The dorsum has short pubescence.

== Etymology ==
The species name refers to the type locality.
