= Rhyzobius klapperichi =

Scientific classification
- Kingdom: Animalia
- Phylum: Arthropoda
- Clade: Pancrustacea
- Class: Insecta
- Order: Coleoptera
- Suborder: Polyphaga
- Infraorder: Cucujiformia
- Family: Coccinellidae
- Genus: Rhyzobius
- Species: R. klapperichi

Binomial name
- Rhyzobius klapperichi Fürsch, 1992

Species of beetle

Rhyzobius klapperichi is a species of beetle of the family Coccinellidae. It is found in South Africa (Western Cape, Eastern Cape).

== Description ==
Adults reach a length of about 2.5–3.5 mm (0.098–0.138 in). They have an elongate oval, moderately convex body. They are mostly light brown to dark brown with the elytra blackish. Each elytron has two brown spots on the disc. The pubescence on the dorsum consists of appresed setae and dark stiff bristles.
