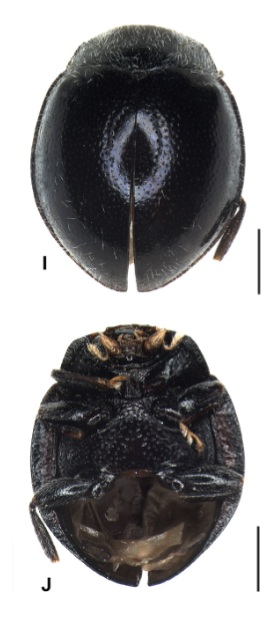

Scientific classification
- Kingdom: Animalia
- Phylum: Arthropoda
- Clade: Pancrustacea
- Class: Insecta
- Order: Coleoptera
- Suborder: Polyphaga
- Infraorder: Cucujiformia
- Family: Coccinellidae
- Genus: Rhyzobius
- Species: R. serratus

Binomial name
- Rhyzobius serratus Czerwinski, Szawaryn & Tomaszewska, 2020

= Rhyzobius serratus =

Species of beetle

Rhyzobius serratus is a species of beetle of the family Coccinellidae. It is found in Papua New Guinea.

== Description ==
Adults reach a length of about 2.3 mm (0.091 in). They have a broadly oval, dorsally strongly convex, hemispherical body. They are black and shiny and the antennae are pale brown. The dorsum has double pubescence consisting of appressed setae and sparse darker stiff bristles which are distinct along the elytral lateral margins only. The dorsal pubescence does not form a pattern on the elytra.

== Etymology ==
The species name is derived from Latin and refers to the serrate outer surface of the penis guide.
