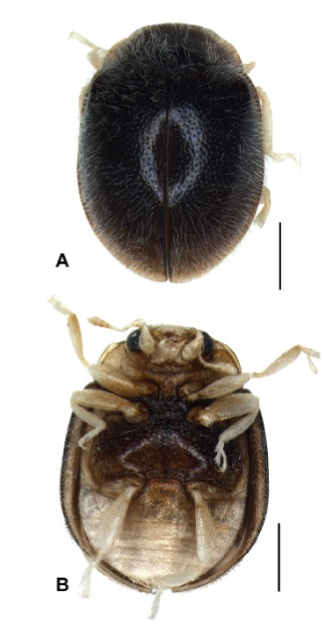

Scientific classification
- Kingdom: Animalia
- Phylum: Arthropoda
- Clade: Pancrustacea
- Class: Insecta
- Order: Coleoptera
- Suborder: Polyphaga
- Infraorder: Cucujiformia
- Family: Coccinellidae
- Genus: Rhyzobius
- Species: R. albinos

Binomial name
- Rhyzobius albinos Czerwinski, Szawaryn & Tomaszewska, 2020

= Rhyzobius albinos =

Species of beetle

Rhyzobius albinos is a species of beetle of the family Coccinellidae. It is found in Papua New Guinea.

== Description ==
Adults reach a length of about 2–2.25 mm (0.079–0.089 in). They have a moderately oval and dorsally convex body. The antennae, apex of the elytra and most of the legs are whitish, while the frons, anterior and lateral margins of the pronotum and preapical parts of the elytra are pale brown. The posterior and central parts of the pronotum, and most of the elytra are blackish or dark brown. The elytra have a weak bluish metallic sheen. The dorsum has moderately long and uniform pubescence, not forming a pattern on the elytra.

== Etymology ==
The species name is the Polish word for albino and refers to the bright colouration of most of the ventral surfaces.
