= Rhyzobius dryandra =

Scientific classification
- Kingdom: Animalia
- Phylum: Arthropoda
- Clade: Pancrustacea
- Class: Insecta
- Order: Coleoptera
- Suborder: Polyphaga
- Infraorder: Cucujiformia
- Family: Coccinellidae
- Genus: Rhyzobius
- Species: R. dryandra

Binomial name
- Rhyzobius dryandra Tomaszewska, 2010

Species of beetle

Rhyzobius dryandra is a species of beetle of the family Coccinellidae. It is found in Australia (Western Australia).

== Description ==
Adults reach a length of about 3.5–3.6 mm (0.14–0.14 in). They have a broadly oval, moderately convex body. They are blackish brown or dark chestnut brown, with the antennae and legs light brown. The pubescence on the dorsum consists of appresed setae and dark stiff bristles, forming a wavy pattern on the elytra.
