= Rhyzobius gingera =

Scientific classification
- Kingdom: Animalia
- Phylum: Arthropoda
- Clade: Pancrustacea
- Class: Insecta
- Order: Coleoptera
- Suborder: Polyphaga
- Infraorder: Cucujiformia
- Family: Coccinellidae
- Genus: Rhyzobius
- Species: R. gingera

Binomial name
- Rhyzobius gingera Tomaszewska, 2010

Species of beetle

Rhyzobius gingera is a species of beetle of the family Coccinellidae. It is found in Australia (New South Wales, Australian Capital Territory).

== Description ==
Adults reach a length of about 3.75–4.5 mm (0.148–0.177 in). They have an elongate oval, moderately convex body. They are brownish black or black, with the head, anterior and lateral area of pronotum and sometimes the lateral and/or apical margins of the elytra brown. The ventral surface of the head, pronotum and abdomen is red brown. The antennae are usually yellowish. There is moderately long pubescence on the dorsum, as well as erect bristles along the margins of the elytra.

== Etymology ==
The species is named after Mount Gingera, where the holotype was collected.
