= Rhyzobius tasmanicus =

Scientific classification
- Kingdom: Animalia
- Phylum: Arthropoda
- Clade: Pancrustacea
- Class: Insecta
- Order: Coleoptera
- Suborder: Polyphaga
- Infraorder: Cucujiformia
- Family: Coccinellidae
- Genus: Rhyzobius
- Species: R. tasmanicus

Binomial name
- Rhyzobius tasmanicus Tomaszewska, 2010

Species of beetle

Rhyzobius tasmanicus is a species of beetle of the family Coccinellidae. It is found in Australia (Tasmania).

== Description ==
Adults reach a length of about 1.75–2.1 mm (0.069–0.083 in). They have an elongate oval, flattened body. The head, disc of the pronotum and the elytra are blackish brown or almost black, with the lateral and anterior margins of the pronotum yellowish brown. The elytra have a yellow pattern of wavy stripes. The ventral surface is dark brown and the antennae and legs are yellowish brown. The dorsum is covered with pubescence forming a wavy pattern on the elytra.

== Etymology ==
The species is named after the Australian State of its distribution.
