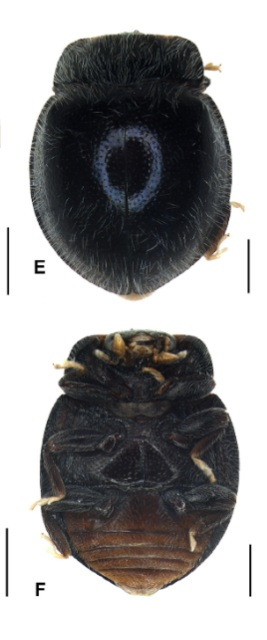

Scientific classification
- Kingdom: Animalia
- Phylum: Arthropoda
- Clade: Pancrustacea
- Class: Insecta
- Order: Coleoptera
- Suborder: Polyphaga
- Infraorder: Cucujiformia
- Family: Coccinellidae
- Genus: Rhyzobius
- Species: R. atramentarius

Binomial name
- Rhyzobius atramentarius Czerwinski, Szawaryn & Tomaszewska, 2020

= Rhyzobius atramentarius =

Species of beetle

Rhyzobius atramentarius is a species of beetle of the family Coccinellidae. It is found in Papua New Guinea.

== Description ==
Adults reach a length of about 2–2.35 mm (0.079–0.093 in). They have a broadly oval, dorsally strongly convex, hemispherical body. They are black or blackish brown, predominantly with a bluish metallic sheen. The antennae are brown. The dorsum has double pubescence consisting of appressed setae and sparse darker stiff bristles. The dorsal pubescence forms a weak wavy pattern on the elytra and sparse elytral bristles are present on the lateral margins and apices only.

== Etymology ==
The species name is the Latin word for inky and refers to the body colouration.
