= Rhyzobius riedeli =

Scientific classification
- Kingdom: Animalia
- Phylum: Arthropoda
- Clade: Pancrustacea
- Class: Insecta
- Order: Coleoptera
- Suborder: Polyphaga
- Infraorder: Cucujiformia
- Family: Coccinellidae
- Genus: Rhyzobius
- Species: R. riedeli

Binomial name
- Rhyzobius riedeli Tomaszewska, 2010

Species of beetle

Rhyzobius riedeli is a species of beetle of the family Coccinellidae. It is found in Indonesia (Maluku Islands: Halmahera, Morotai).

== Description ==
Adults reach a length of about 3.23–3.33 mm (0.127–0.131 in). They have a broadly oval, strongly convex body. They are mostly black, the elytra with a violet metallic sheen. The head (including antennae) and most of the legs are light brown. The dorsum has moderately long pubescence.

== Etymology ==
The species is dedicated to Dr. Alexander Riedel, the collector of the type series.
