= Rhyzobius brevicornis =

Scientific classification
- Kingdom: Animalia
- Phylum: Arthropoda
- Clade: Pancrustacea
- Class: Insecta
- Order: Coleoptera
- Suborder: Polyphaga
- Infraorder: Cucujiformia
- Family: Coccinellidae
- Genus: Rhyzobius
- Species: R. brevicornis

Binomial name
- Rhyzobius brevicornis Weise, 1895

Species of beetle

Rhyzobius brevicornis is a species of beetle of the family Coccinellidae. It is found on Borneo.

== Description ==
Adults reach a length of about 1.9 mm (0.075 in). They have an elongate oval, moderately convex body. They are dark brown, with the ventral surface of the head (including antennae) and legs somewhat paler. The dorsum has moderately long pubescence.
