= Rhyzobius brunneus =

Scientific classification
- Kingdom: Animalia
- Phylum: Arthropoda
- Clade: Pancrustacea
- Class: Insecta
- Order: Coleoptera
- Suborder: Polyphaga
- Infraorder: Cucujiformia
- Family: Coccinellidae
- Genus: Rhyzobius
- Species: R. brunneus

Binomial name
- Rhyzobius brunneus Tomaszewska, 2010

Species of beetle

Rhyzobius brunneus is a species of beetle of the family Coccinellidae. It is found in Australia (New South Wales).

== Description ==
Adults reach a length of about 2.2–2.55 mm (0.087–0.100 in). They have an elongate oval, moderately convex body. They are dark brown or dark reddish brown, with the antennae light brown or yellowish brown. The pubescence on the dorsum consists of appresed setae and suberect bristles and forms a weak wavy pattern on the elytra.
