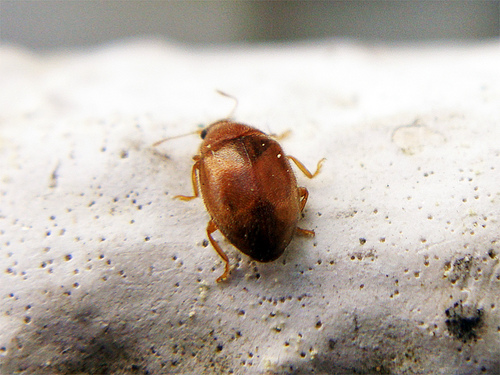

Scientific classification
- Kingdom: Animalia
- Phylum: Arthropoda
- Clade: Pancrustacea
- Class: Insecta
- Order: Coleoptera
- Suborder: Polyphaga
- Infraorder: Cucujiformia
- Family: Coccinellidae
- Genus: Rhyzobius
- Species: R. litura

Binomial name
- Rhyzobius litura (Fabricius, 1787)

Synonyms
- Nitidula litura Fabricius, 1787; Anthribus lividus Olivier, 1791; Coccinella fasciata Fabricius, 1801; Rhizobius litura maura O'Mahony, 1927; Rhizobius nigriventris Thomson, 1866; Rhizobius discimacula Mulsant, 1846; Dermestes coadunatus Marsham, 1802; Dermestes hypomelanus Marsham, 1802; Dermestes pallidus Marsham, 1802; Rhizobius pallidulus Marsham, 1802; Coccinella aurora Creutzer, 1796; Nitidula testaceus Fabricius, 1794

= Rhyzobius litura =

Species of beetle

Rhyzobius litura, the pointed-keeled Rhyzobius, is a species of beetle in family Coccinellidae. It is found in the Palearctic It is mainly found in Western Europe, especially in the United Kingdom In the southeast, the area spreads to Bulgaria and Greece. In the East it is partly replaced by the related species Rhyzobius chrysomeloides.

== Description ==
Adults reach a length of about 2.45–3.1 mm (0.096–0.122 in). They have an elongate oval, moderately convex body. The pronotum is brown and the elytra are reddish or yellowish with a dark brown or black pattern. The antennae and legs are brown.

== Life History ==
The species lives in forests on trees and on various herbaceous plants in places where it is protected from wind and weather.
