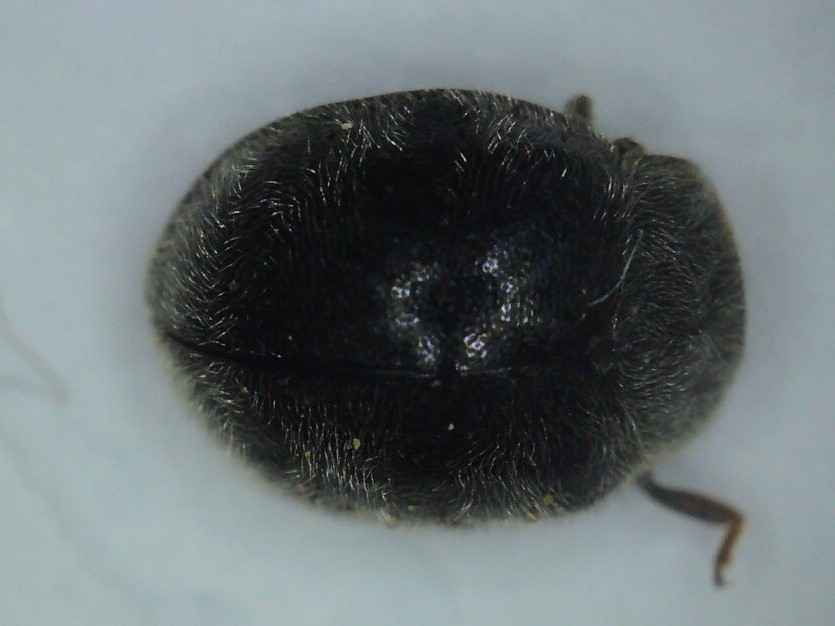

Scientific classification
- Kingdom: Animalia
- Phylum: Arthropoda
- Clade: Pancrustacea
- Class: Insecta
- Order: Coleoptera
- Suborder: Polyphaga
- Infraorder: Cucujiformia
- Family: Coccinellidae
- Genus: Rhyzobius
- Species: R. forestieri

Binomial name
- Rhyzobius forestieri (Mulsant, 1853)

Synonyms
- Platyomus forestieri Mulsant, 1853; Scymnus circularis Sharp, 1889

= Rhyzobius forestieri =

Species of beetle

Rhyzobius forestieri is a species of lady beetle in the family Coccinellidae. It is found in Australia (Queensland, New South Wales, Australian Capital Territory, Tasmania, Western Australia), North America, Oceania, and Europe. The species is thought to be originally from Australia and recently introduced to parts of Europe in the 1980s as a biological control agent to control the Olive Scale pest (Saissetia oleae).

== Description ==
Adults reach a length of about 3.05–3.35 mm (0.120–0.132 in). They have a broadly oval, strongly convex body. They are black, with the antennae brownish. The pubescence on the dorsum consists of appresed setae and stiff bristles, forming a wavy pattern on the elytra.
