= Rhyzobius micrus =

Scientific classification
- Kingdom: Animalia
- Phylum: Arthropoda
- Clade: Pancrustacea
- Class: Insecta
- Order: Coleoptera
- Suborder: Polyphaga
- Infraorder: Cucujiformia
- Family: Coccinellidae
- Genus: Rhyzobius
- Species: R. micrus

Binomial name
- Rhyzobius micrus Tomaszewska, 2010

Species of beetle

Rhyzobius micrus is a species of beetle of the family Coccinellidae. It is found in Australia (Queensland).

== Description ==
Adults reach a length of about 1.83–1.87 mm (0.072–0.074 in). They have a broadly oval, strongly convex body. The dorsal surface is brownish black to black with a metallic blue sheen on the elytra. The ventral surface is dark brown to blackish brown and the antennae and most of the legs are light brown. The pubescence on the dorsum consists of appresed setae and long, dark stiff bristles.

== Etymology ==
The species name refers to its small body.
