= Rhyzobius nigripennis =

Scientific classification
- Kingdom: Animalia
- Phylum: Arthropoda
- Clade: Pancrustacea
- Class: Insecta
- Order: Coleoptera
- Suborder: Polyphaga
- Infraorder: Cucujiformia
- Family: Coccinellidae
- Genus: Rhyzobius
- Species: R. nigripennis

Binomial name
- Rhyzobius nigripennis Fauvel, 1903

Species of beetle

Rhyzobius nigripennis is a species of beetle of the family Coccinellidae. It is found in New Caledonia.

== Description ==
Adults reach a length of about 2.15–2.85 mm (0.085–0.112 in). They have a broadly oval, moderately convex body. The dorsal surface of the head, pronotum and an oval spot along the elytral suture are dark brown to chestnut brown. The rest of the surface of the elytra is blackish or deep black. The ventral surfaces of the head and prothorax are orange brown. The antennae and legs are light brown. The pubescence on the dorsum consists of appresed setae and darker stiff bristles, forming a wavy pattern on the elytra.
