= Rhyzobius cyaneus =

Scientific classification
- Kingdom: Animalia
- Phylum: Arthropoda
- Clade: Pancrustacea
- Class: Insecta
- Order: Coleoptera
- Suborder: Polyphaga
- Infraorder: Cucujiformia
- Family: Coccinellidae
- Genus: Rhyzobius
- Species: R. cyaneus

Binomial name
- Rhyzobius cyaneus Blackburn, 1889

Species of beetle

Rhyzobius cyaneus is a species of beetle of the family Coccinellidae. It is found in Australia (New South Wales, Australian Capital Territory, Victoria).

== Description ==
Adults reach a length of about 2.9–3 mm (0.11–0.12 in). They have an elongate and almost parallel-sided, flattened body. The dorsal surface is black, the elytra with a bluish or purple sheen. The head, lateral and anterior margins of the pronotum, lateral and apical margins of the elytra and ventral surface are orange brown. The pubescence on the dorsum consists of appresed setae and dark stiff bristles, forming a weak wavy pattern on the elytra.
