= Rhyzobius pictus =

Scientific classification
- Kingdom: Animalia
- Phylum: Arthropoda
- Clade: Pancrustacea
- Class: Insecta
- Order: Coleoptera
- Suborder: Polyphaga
- Infraorder: Cucujiformia
- Family: Coccinellidae
- Genus: Rhyzobius
- Species: R. pictus

Binomial name
- Rhyzobius pictus (Sicard, 1912)

Synonyms
- Pharoscymnus pictus Sicard, 1912; Rhizobius rotundatus Weise, 1913

Species of beetle

Rhyzobius pictus is a species of beetle of the family Coccinellidae. It is found in South Africa (Western Cape, Eastern Cape).

== Description ==
Adults reach a length of about 2.1–2.85 mm (0.083–0.112 in). They have a broadly oval, moderately convex body. They are yellowish brown with a pattern of dark stripes and bands. The pubescence on the dorsum consists of appresed setae and some stiff bristles.
