= Rhyzobius umbratus =

Scientific classification
- Kingdom: Animalia
- Phylum: Arthropoda
- Clade: Pancrustacea
- Class: Insecta
- Order: Coleoptera
- Suborder: Polyphaga
- Infraorder: Cucujiformia
- Family: Coccinellidae
- Genus: Rhyzobius
- Species: R. umbratus

Binomial name
- Rhyzobius umbratus Blackburn, 1889

Species of beetle

Rhyzobius umbratus is a species of beetle of the family Coccinellidae. It is found in Australia (Western Australia, South Australia, Victoria, Australian Capital Territory, New South Wales).

== Description ==
Adults reach a length of about 1.4–1.9 mm (0.055–0.075 in). They have a broadly oval, moderately convex body. The dorsal surface is light to dark brown with three pale markings on each elytron. The ventral surface is dark brown and the legs and antennae are light brown. The dorsum has short pubescence, forming a wavy pattern on the elytra.
