= Rhyzobius poorani =

Scientific classification
- Kingdom: Animalia
- Phylum: Arthropoda
- Clade: Pancrustacea
- Class: Insecta
- Order: Coleoptera
- Suborder: Polyphaga
- Infraorder: Cucujiformia
- Family: Coccinellidae
- Genus: Rhyzobius
- Species: R. poorani

Binomial name
- Rhyzobius poorani Tomaszewska, 2010

Species of beetle

Rhyzobius poorani is a species of beetle of the family Coccinellidae. It is found in Indonesia (Irian Jaya).

== Description ==
Adults reach a length of about 2.4–2.9 mm (0.094–0.114 in). They have a broadly oval, strongly convex body. They are mostly black with the head, pronotum (along the lateral and anterior margins), antennae and most of the legs brown. The elytra have a blue metallic sheen. The pubescence on the dorsum consists of appresed setae and darker stiff bristles.

== Etymology ==
The species is dedicated to coccinellid specialist Dr. J. Poorani.
