= Rhyzobius iracildae =

Scientific classification
- Kingdom: Animalia
- Phylum: Arthropoda
- Clade: Pancrustacea
- Class: Insecta
- Order: Coleoptera
- Suborder: Polyphaga
- Infraorder: Cucujiformia
- Family: Coccinellidae
- Genus: Rhyzobius
- Species: R. iracildae

Binomial name
- Rhyzobius iracildae Tomaszewska, 2010

Species of beetle

Rhyzobius iracildae is a species of beetle of the family Coccinellidae. It is found in Indonesia (Irian Jaya).

== Description ==
Adults reach a length of about 2.85–3.65 mm (0.112–0.144 in). They have a broadly oval, strongly convex body. They are deep black, usually with a green or purple metallic sheen on the elytra. The antennae are mostly dark brown. The dorsum has moderately long pubescence.

== Etymology ==
The species is dedicated to the coccinellid specialist Dr. Iracilda Maria de Moura Lima.
