= Rhyzobius nataliae =

Scientific classification
- Kingdom: Animalia
- Phylum: Arthropoda
- Clade: Pancrustacea
- Class: Insecta
- Order: Coleoptera
- Suborder: Polyphaga
- Infraorder: Cucujiformia
- Family: Coccinellidae
- Genus: Rhyzobius
- Species: R. nataliae

Binomial name
- Rhyzobius nataliae Tomaszewska, 2010

Species of beetle

Rhyzobius nataliae is a species of beetle of the family Coccinellidae. It is found in Australia (New South Wales).

== Description ==
Adults reach a length of about 2.13–2.5 mm (0.084–0.098 in). They have a broadly oval, moderately convex body. They are mostly yellowish brown, but the elytra are black (except for the apex). The pubescence on the dorsum consists of appresed setae and darker stiff bristles, forming a wavy pattern on the elytra.

== Etymology ==
The species is dedicated to the coccinellid specialist Dr. Natalia Vandenberg.
