= Rhyzobius rodmani =

Scientific classification
- Kingdom: Animalia
- Phylum: Arthropoda
- Clade: Pancrustacea
- Class: Insecta
- Order: Coleoptera
- Suborder: Polyphaga
- Infraorder: Cucujiformia
- Family: Coccinellidae
- Genus: Rhyzobius
- Species: R. rodmani

Binomial name
- Rhyzobius rodmani Tomaszewska, 2010

Species of beetle

Rhyzobius rodmani is a species of beetle of the family Coccinellidae. It is found in Australia (Queensland, New South Wales).

== Description ==
Adults reach a length of about 1.73–1.87 mm (0.068–0.074 in). They have a broadly oval, strongly convex body. The dorsal surface of the head, pronotum and legs is light brown, while the elytra blackish. The ventral surface is dark brown and the antennae are usually yellow or yellowish brown. The pubescence on the dorsum consists of appresed setae and dark stiff bristles, forming a wavy pattern on the elytra.

== Etymology ==
The species is dedicated to Dr. Jim Rodman of the National Science Foundation.
