= Rhyzobius metallicus =

Scientific classification
- Kingdom: Animalia
- Phylum: Arthropoda
- Clade: Pancrustacea
- Class: Insecta
- Order: Coleoptera
- Suborder: Polyphaga
- Infraorder: Cucujiformia
- Family: Coccinellidae
- Genus: Rhyzobius
- Species: R. metallicus

Binomial name
- Rhyzobius metallicus Tomaszewska, 2010

Species of beetle

Rhyzobius metallicus is a species of beetle of the family Coccinellidae. It is found in Papua New Guinea.

== Description ==
Adults reach a length of about 2.87–3.33 mm (0.113–0.131 in). They have a broadly oval, strongly convex body. The dorsum is black with a very intensive green, violet and bluish metallic sheen on the elytra. The ventral surface is black with the antennae blackish brown. The pubescence on the dorsum consists of short appresed setae and darker stiff bristles.

== Etymology ==
The species name refers to the very intensive metallic green, violet and blue sheen on the elytra.
