= Rhyzobius hongae =

Scientific classification
- Kingdom: Animalia
- Phylum: Arthropoda
- Clade: Pancrustacea
- Class: Insecta
- Order: Coleoptera
- Suborder: Polyphaga
- Infraorder: Cucujiformia
- Family: Coccinellidae
- Genus: Rhyzobius
- Species: R. hongae

Binomial name
- Rhyzobius hongae Tomaszewska, 2010

Species of beetle

Rhyzobius hongae is a species of beetle of the family Coccinellidae. It is found in Australia (New South Wales).

== Description ==
Adults reach a length of about 2.35–2.6 mm (0.093–0.102 in). They have an elongate oval, moderately convex body. They light brown to dark chestnut brown, with the disc of the pronotum infuscate or blackish. The elytra have a long, infuscate band and the suture along the apical fourth is black. The ventral surface is mostly dark brown to blackish brown and the antennae are yellowish brown. The dorsum is covered with sub-erect pubescence forming a wavy pattern on the elytra.

== Etymology ==
The species is dedicated to cociinellid specialist Dr. Hong Pang.
