= Rhyzobius caecus =

Scientific classification
- Kingdom: Animalia
- Phylum: Arthropoda
- Clade: Pancrustacea
- Class: Insecta
- Order: Coleoptera
- Suborder: Polyphaga
- Infraorder: Cucujiformia
- Family: Coccinellidae
- Genus: Rhyzobius
- Species: R. caecus

Binomial name
- Rhyzobius caecus Blackburn, 1892

Species of beetle

Rhyzobius caecus is a species of beetle of the family Coccinellidae. It is found in Australia (Queensland, New South Wales).

== Description ==
Adults reach a length of about 2.37–2.65 mm (0.093–0.104 in). They have an elongate oval, moderately convex body. They are brown, dark brown or reddish brown, sometimes with the antennae lighter. The pronotum has yellowish anterior angles. The dorsum is covered with moderately long and pubescence, forming a weak wavy pattern on the elytra.
