= Rhyzobius c-pallidum =

Scientific classification
- Kingdom: Animalia
- Phylum: Arthropoda
- Clade: Pancrustacea
- Class: Insecta
- Order: Coleoptera
- Suborder: Polyphaga
- Infraorder: Cucujiformia
- Family: Coccinellidae
- Genus: Rhyzobius
- Species: R. c-pallidum

Binomial name
- Rhyzobius c-pallidum Weise, 1909

Species of beetle

Rhyzobius c-pallidum is a species of beetle of the family Coccinellidae. It is found in Madagascar.

== Description ==
Adults reach a length of about 2.5–2.9 mm (0.098–0.114 in). They have a broadly oval, strongly convex body. The dorsum is black and each elytron has a yellowish brown, large, c-shaped spot on the disc. The ventral surface is dark chestnut brown and the antennae are light brown. There is moderately long pubescence on the dorsum.
