= Rhyzobius nigrovarius =

Scientific classification
- Kingdom: Animalia
- Phylum: Arthropoda
- Clade: Pancrustacea
- Class: Insecta
- Order: Coleoptera
- Suborder: Polyphaga
- Infraorder: Cucujiformia
- Family: Coccinellidae
- Genus: Rhyzobius
- Species: R. nigrovarius

Binomial name
- Rhyzobius nigrovarius Lea, 1908

Species of beetle

Rhyzobius nigrovarius is a species of beetle of the family Coccinellidae. It is found in Australia (King Island).

== Description ==
Adults reach a length of about 1.65–1.68 mm (0.065–0.066 in). They have an elongate oval, moderately convex body. The head and pronotum (along the middle) are dark brown, while the pronotal margins are yellowish. The elytra are reddish or yellowish with a dark brown or blackish pattern. The ventral surface is dark brown, with the legs and antennae yellowish. The dorsum has moderately long and pubescence, forming a wavy pattern on the elytra.
