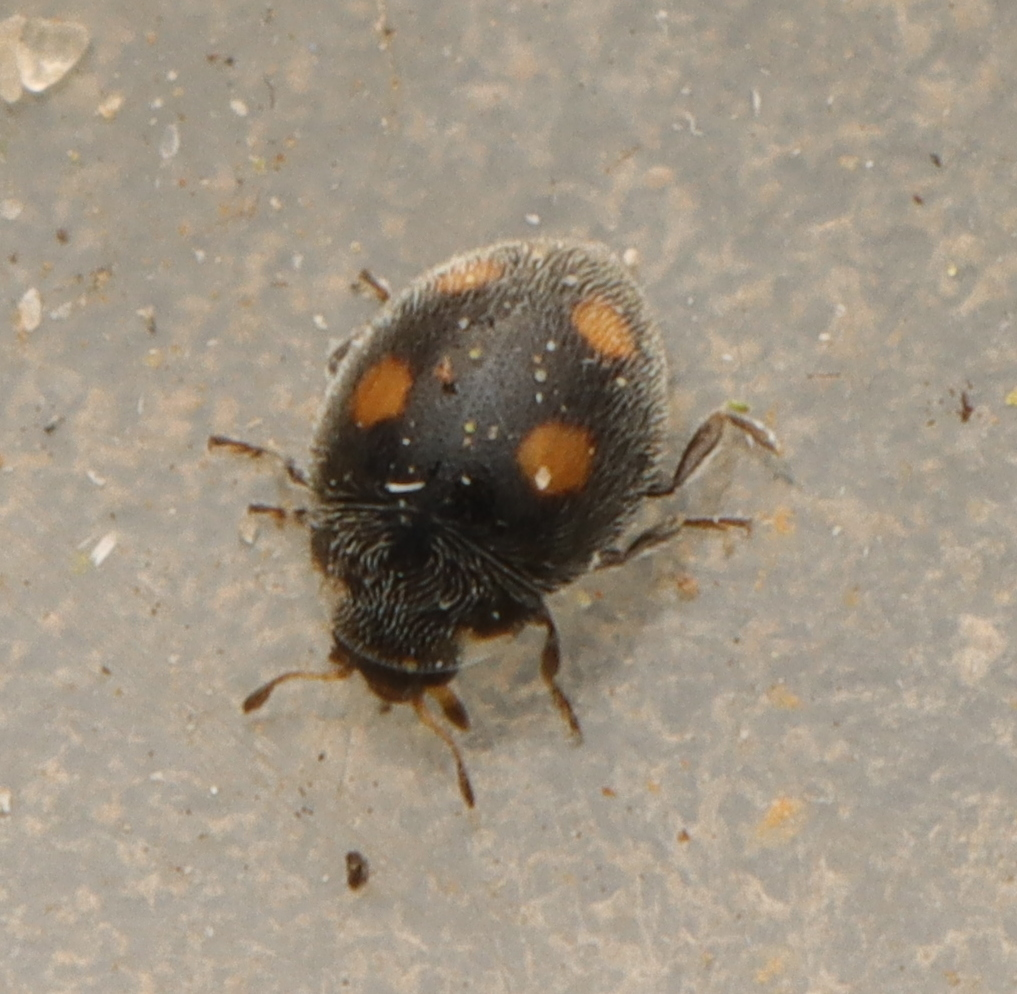

Scientific classification
- Kingdom: Animalia
- Phylum: Arthropoda
- Clade: Pancrustacea
- Class: Insecta
- Order: Coleoptera
- Suborder: Polyphaga
- Infraorder: Cucujiformia
- Family: Coccinellidae
- Genus: Rhyzobius
- Species: R. burmeisteri

Binomial name
- Rhyzobius burmeisteri Mulsant, 1850

Synonyms
- Rhyzobius trimeni Casey, 1899; Coccinella colon Thunberg, 1795

= Rhyzobius burmeisteri =

Species of beetle

Rhyzobius burmeisteri is a species of beetle of the family Coccinellidae. It is found in South Africa (Western Cape, Northern Cape).

== Description ==
Adults reach a length of about 2.95–3.6 mm (0.116–0.142 in). They have a broadly oval, moderately convex body. They are mostly black, but each elytron has small, round, yellow or orange spots in and the anterior angles of the pronotum are pale. The antennae are dark. There is moderately long pubescence on the dorsum.
