= Rhyzobius apicalis =

Scientific classification
- Kingdom: Animalia
- Phylum: Arthropoda
- Clade: Pancrustacea
- Class: Insecta
- Order: Coleoptera
- Suborder: Polyphaga
- Infraorder: Cucujiformia
- Family: Coccinellidae
- Genus: Rhyzobius
- Species: R. apicalis

Binomial name
- Rhyzobius apicalis Blackburn, 1892

Species of beetle

Rhyzobius apicalis is a species of beetle of the family Coccinellidae. It is found in Australia (Queensland, Australian Capital Territory, New South Wales).

== Description ==
Adults reach a length of about 2.4–2.57 mm (0.094–0.101 in). They have a broadly oval, strongly convex body. They are black, with the anterior angles of the pronotum pale yellow and the elytral apices and antennae orange. The pubescence on the dorsum consists of appresed setae and dark stiff bristles.
