= Rhyzobius tribulation =

Scientific classification
- Kingdom: Animalia
- Phylum: Arthropoda
- Clade: Pancrustacea
- Class: Insecta
- Order: Coleoptera
- Suborder: Polyphaga
- Infraorder: Cucujiformia
- Family: Coccinellidae
- Genus: Rhyzobius
- Species: R. tribulation

Binomial name
- Rhyzobius tribulation Tomaszewska, 2010

Species of beetle

Rhyzobius tribulation is a species of beetle of the family Coccinellidae. It is found in Australia (Queensland).

== Description ==
Adults reach a length of about 2.05–2.3 mm (0.081–0.091 in). They have a broadly oval, strongly convex body. The dorsum is chestnut brown with dark markings on the elytra. The ventral surface is dark brown and the legs and antennae are yellowish brown. The pubescence on the dorsum consists of appresed setae and dark stiff bristles, forming a wavy pattern on the elytra.

== Etymology ==
The species is named after Cape Tribulation, the locality where the holotype was collected.
