= Rhyzobius virgatus =

Scientific classification
- Kingdom: Animalia
- Phylum: Arthropoda
- Clade: Pancrustacea
- Class: Insecta
- Order: Coleoptera
- Suborder: Polyphaga
- Infraorder: Cucujiformia
- Family: Coccinellidae
- Genus: Rhyzobius
- Species: R. virgatus

Binomial name
- Rhyzobius virgatus Lea, 1902

Species of beetle

Rhyzobius virgatus is a species of beetle of the family Coccinellidae. It is found in Australia (Tasmania, Victoria, South Australia, Australian Capital Territory).

== Description ==
Adults reach a length of about 2.3–2.67 mm (0.091–0.105 in). They have a broadly oval, moderately convex body. They are mostly yellowish brown, dark brown or chestnut brown, but each elytron has a black band and a narrow black stripe. The legs and antennae are sometimes paler than the ventral surface. The pubescence on the dorsum consists of appresed setae and long dark stiff bristles. The pubescence forms a wavy pattern on the elytra.
