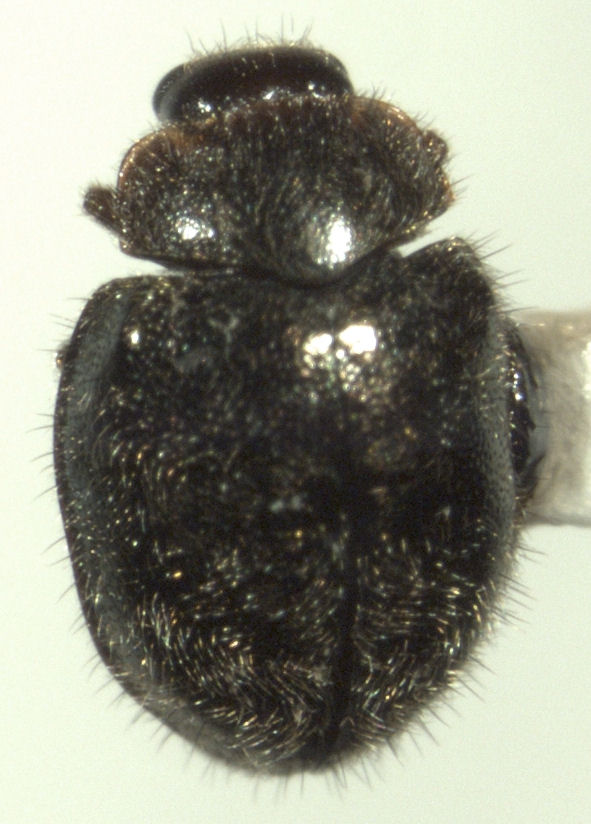

Scientific classification
- Kingdom: Animalia
- Phylum: Arthropoda
- Clade: Pancrustacea
- Class: Insecta
- Order: Coleoptera
- Suborder: Polyphaga
- Infraorder: Cucujiformia
- Family: Coccinellidae
- Genus: Rhyzobius
- Species: R. fagus

Binomial name
- Rhyzobius fagus (Broun, 1880)

Synonyms
- Scymnus fagus Broun, 1880; Rhyzobius nigrovatus Bielawski, 1973; Rhizobius erythrogaster Lea, 1929; Rhizobius kingensis Lea, 1908; Rhizobius satelles Blackburn, 1892

= Rhyzobius fagus =

Species of beetle

Rhyzobius fagus is a species of beetle of the family Coccinellidae. It is found in Australia (New South Wales, Australian Capital Territory, Queensland, King Island, Norfolk Island, Phillip Island), New Caledonia, New Zealand, Tonga, as well as Africa.

== Description ==
Adults reach a length of about 2.2–3 mm (0.087–0.118 in). They have a broadly oval, strongly convex body. They are black with the antennae yellowish-brown. The pubescence on the dorsum consists of appresed setae and dark stiff bristles, forming a wavy pattern on the elytra.
