= Rhyzobius discipennis =

Scientific classification
- Kingdom: Animalia
- Phylum: Arthropoda
- Clade: Pancrustacea
- Class: Insecta
- Order: Coleoptera
- Suborder: Polyphaga
- Infraorder: Cucujiformia
- Family: Coccinellidae
- Genus: Rhyzobius
- Species: R. discipennis

Binomial name
- Rhyzobius discipennis Blackburn, 1895

Species of beetle

Rhyzobius discipennis is a species of beetle of the family Coccinellidae. It is found in Australia (Queensland, Northern Territory).

== Description ==
Adults reach a length of about 1.8–2.25 mm (0.071–0.089 in). They have a broadly oval, strongly convex body. They are brownish black to black, but the ventral surface is dark brown. The antennae and legs are light brown. The pubescence on the dorsum consists of appresed setae and dark stiff bristles and forms a wavy pattern on the elytra.
