= Rhyzobius decussatolobatus =

Scientific classification
- Kingdom: Animalia
- Phylum: Arthropoda
- Clade: Pancrustacea
- Class: Insecta
- Order: Coleoptera
- Suborder: Polyphaga
- Infraorder: Cucujiformia
- Family: Coccinellidae
- Genus: Rhyzobius
- Species: R. decussatolobatus

Binomial name
- Rhyzobius decussatolobatus Fürsch, 1992

Species of beetle

Rhyzobius decussatolobatus is a species of beetle of the family Coccinellidae. It is found in South Africa (Eastern Cape, Western Cape, KwaZulu-Natal).

== Description ==
Adults reach a length of about 3.2–3.85 mm (0.126–0.152 in). They have an elongate oval, moderately convex body. The head and pronotum are blackish brown to black with the anterior angles of the latter pale. The elytra are black with two red spots on each elytron. The ventral surface of the head, pronotum and legs is brown. The pubescence on the dorsum consists of appresed setae and dark stiff bristles.
