= Rhyzobius apicesignatus =

Scientific classification
- Kingdom: Animalia
- Phylum: Arthropoda
- Clade: Pancrustacea
- Class: Insecta
- Order: Coleoptera
- Suborder: Polyphaga
- Infraorder: Cucujiformia
- Family: Coccinellidae
- Genus: Rhyzobius
- Species: R. apicesignatus

Binomial name
- Rhyzobius apicesignatus Fürsch, 1992

Species of beetle

Rhyzobius apicesignatus is a species of beetle of the family Coccinellidae. It is found in South Africa (Western Cape).

== Description ==
Adults reach a length of about 2.6–3.17 mm (0.102–0.125 in). They have an elongate oval, moderately convex body. They are light brown, with the apex of the elytra dark brown with a pale macula within this darker area. The pubescence on the dorsum consists of appresed setae and dark stiff bristles.
