= Rhyzobius luciae =

Scientific classification
- Kingdom: Animalia
- Phylum: Arthropoda
- Clade: Pancrustacea
- Class: Insecta
- Order: Coleoptera
- Suborder: Polyphaga
- Infraorder: Cucujiformia
- Family: Coccinellidae
- Genus: Rhyzobius
- Species: R. luciae

Binomial name
- Rhyzobius luciae Tomaszewska, 2010

Species of beetle

Rhyzobius luciae is a species of beetle of the family Coccinellidae. It is found in Indonesia (Irian Jaya).

== Description ==
Adults reach a length of about 2.45–2.73 mm (0.096–0.107 in). They have a broadly oval, strongly convex body. The head, pronotum, legs and antennae are orange brown, while the elytra are black with a cupreous metallic sheen. The pubescence on the dorsum consists of appresed setae and darker stiff bristles.

== Etymology ==
The species is dedicated to coccinellid specialist Dr. Lucia Massuti de Almeida.
