= Rhyzobius noctuabundus =

Scientific classification
- Kingdom: Animalia
- Phylum: Arthropoda
- Clade: Pancrustacea
- Class: Insecta
- Order: Coleoptera
- Suborder: Polyphaga
- Infraorder: Cucujiformia
- Family: Coccinellidae
- Genus: Rhyzobius
- Species: R. noctuabundus

Binomial name
- Rhyzobius noctuabundus Lea, 1914

Synonyms
- Rhizobius noctuabundus Lea, 1914

Species of beetle

Rhyzobius noctuabundus is a species of beetle of the family Coccinellidae. It is found in Australia (Western Australia, Northern Territory, South Australia, Victoria, New South Wales, Queensland).

== Description ==
Adults reach a length of about 2.25–2.9 mm (0.089–0.114 in). They have an elongate oval, moderately convex, dark reddish brown body, with the elytra darker. On the dorsal surface, there are appresed setae and sparse darker bristles along margins. The pubescence forms a wavy pattern on the elytra.
