= Rhyzobius gonzalezi =

Scientific classification
- Kingdom: Animalia
- Phylum: Arthropoda
- Clade: Pancrustacea
- Class: Insecta
- Order: Coleoptera
- Suborder: Polyphaga
- Infraorder: Cucujiformia
- Family: Coccinellidae
- Genus: Rhyzobius
- Species: R. gonzalezi

Binomial name
- Rhyzobius gonzalezi Tomaszewska, 2010

Species of beetle

Rhyzobius gonzalezi is a species of beetle of the family Coccinellidae. It is found in Indonesia (Irian Jaya) and Papua New Guinea.

== Description ==
Adults reach a length of about 2.75–3.2 mm (0.108–0.126 in). They have a broadly oval, strongly convex body. The head, pronotum, apex of the elytra and antennae are dark brown, while most of the elytra is black with a violet or purple metallic sheen. The legs are black. The dorsum has moderately long pubescence.

== Etymology ==
The species is dedicated to the Chilean coccinellid specialist Guillermo Gonzalez.
