= Rhyzobius violaceus =

Scientific classification
- Kingdom: Animalia
- Phylum: Arthropoda
- Clade: Pancrustacea
- Class: Insecta
- Order: Coleoptera
- Suborder: Polyphaga
- Infraorder: Cucujiformia
- Family: Coccinellidae
- Genus: Rhyzobius
- Species: R. violaceus

Binomial name
- Rhyzobius violaceus Tomaszewska, 2010

Species of beetle

Rhyzobius violaceus is a species of beetle of the family Coccinellidae. It is found in Papua New Guinea.

== Description ==
Adults reach a length of about 2.9–2.93 mm (0.114–0.115 in). They have a broadly oval, strongly convex body. The head, pronotum and apex of the elytra are orange brown, while the rest of the elytra is black with a violet metallic sheen. The pubescence on the dorsum consists of appresed setae and sparse darker stiff bristles.

== Etymology ==
The name of the species refers to the violet sheen on the elytra.
