= Frank Ellsworth Blaisdell =

American entomologist

Frank Ellsworth Blaisdell, Sr. (13 March 1862 – 16 July 1946) was an American professor of surgery who also was a keen naturalist and collector who specialized in beetles, and contributed to the systematics of the Tenebrionidae and the Melyridae.

Blaisdell was born in Pittsfield, New Hampshire, but his family moved to San Francisco, after the death of his brothers from scarlet fever, when he was eight, and to San Diego three years later. His father, Solon Greenfield, was a saddle and harness maker, and the family managed a ranch in Poway Valley between 1874 and 1886, where young Blaisdell learned to manage an apiary and began to collect insects. In 1886 he became a county entomologist for San Diego but wished to study medicine. He worked as a clerk and studied medicine under P.C. Remondino and C.C. Valle. He joined Cooper Medical College in 1887 and graduated in 1889 to begin practice in San Diego. He moved to Mokelumne Hill, Calaveras County, in 1892 and worked there until 1900. During this period he married Ella Katherine Peek and they had a son, a namesake who went on to study radiology. On a holiday he collected beetles and plants in Alaska and upon returning took up a faculty position at the Cooper Medical College, where he worked for ten years including a year of study in 1909 at Johns Hopkins University in Baltimore. In 1910, Cooper College became affiliated to Stanford University and Blaisdell was appointed Professor of Surgery. He retired in 1927.

Blaisdell made large collections of beetles and plants, and also studied birds. A part of his large collection of beetles, particularly tenebrionids, was destroyed in the 1906 San Francisco earthquake and fire, but the remainder are now in the California Academy of Sciences. Lupinus blaisdellii was named after him by Alice Eastwood.
