= Rhyzobius pulcher =

Scientific classification
- Kingdom: Animalia
- Phylum: Arthropoda
- Clade: Pancrustacea
- Class: Insecta
- Order: Coleoptera
- Suborder: Polyphaga
- Infraorder: Cucujiformia
- Family: Coccinellidae
- Genus: Rhyzobius
- Species: R. pulcher

Binomial name
- Rhyzobius pulcher Blackburn, 1892

Species of beetle

Rhyzobius pulcher is a species of beetle of the family Coccinellidae. It is found in Australia (Queensland, New South Wales, Victoria).

== Description ==
Adults reach a length of about 1.4–1.9 mm (0.055–0.075 in). They have an elongate oval, moderately convex body. They are mostly yellow or light brown, while the ventral surface of the head is dark brown. The elytra have a blackish brown stripe, forming two diamond shaped maculae. The dorsum has moderately long pubescence, forming a wavy pattern on the elytra.
