= Ontogenetic niche shift =

Ecological phenomenon

The metamorphosis exhibited in frogs is one of the many examples of ontogenetic niche shifting.

Ontogenetic niche shift (abbreviated ONS) is an ecological phenomenon where an organism (usually an animal) changes its diet or habitat during its ontogeny (development). During the ontogenetic niche shifting an ecological niche of an individual changes its breadth and position. The best known representatives of taxa that exhibit some kind of the ontogenetic niche shift are fish (e.g. migration of so-called diadromous fish between saltwater and freshwater for purpose of breeding), insects (e.g. metamorphosis between different life stages; such as larva, pupa and imago) and amphibians (e.g. metamorphosis from tadpole to adult frog). A niche shift is thought to be determined genetically, while also being irreversible. Important aspect of the ONS is the fact that individuals of different stages of a population (e.g. of various age or size) utilize different kind of resources and habitats. The term was introduced in a 1984 paper by biologists Earl E. Werner and James F. Gilliam.

== Characteristics ==
The ontogenetic niche shift is thought to be determined genetically, while also being irreversible. In complex natural systems the ONS happens multiple times in lifetime of an individual (in some examples the ontogenetic niche shifting can occur continuously). The ontogenetic niche shift varies across species; in some it is hardly visible and gradual (for example a change in diet or in size in mammals and reptiles), while in others it is obvious and abrupt (the metamorphosis of insects, which often results in changing habitat, diet and other ecological conditions). One of the studies suggests that differences in the ONS across species could be (at least to some degree) explained by the diversity of traits and functional roles of a species. As a consequence, differences in ontogenetic niche shifting are thought to follow some general patterns.

== Importance ==
=== For communities ===
The ONS, which divides a population of the same species into distinct life-history stages, can affect the food web of a community.

It is thought that almost every organism shows some kind of ontogenetic niche shift. The ONS, which is responsible for causing a noticeable phenotypic variation among individuals of the same species, plays an important role in structuring communities and influencing their inside dynamics. In some cases, individuals undergoing the ONS change their habitat, becoming a (mobile) link between two different communities (for example via flow of energy, matter, and nutrients). A stage structure of a population can result in various stages interacting with different representatives of a community, or even with individuals of other communities, thus having a distinct ecological role from other life-history stages of the same population. Theoretical models, where communities are stage-structured, propose the ontogenetic niche shifting of studied organisms is influencing the whole community (especially its resilience and disturbance responses).

=== For population ===
The most apparent consequence of the ontogenetic niche shift is a reduction of competition between different stages of the same population, because it causes individuals of different age or size to not have to compete for food, materials, and/or other habitat resources. Different stages of the same population also have different trophic effects on food web of a community. A division of a population on distinct life-history stages is useful and evident, when there is a lack of resources for one stage (for example when juveniles do not get enough resources for themselves). In that case, a lacking stage will have a higher mortality rate.

The ONS is of great importance for the survival of populations. Researchers noticed that many species exhibit an ontogenetic niche shift at different times, and in a lot of examples, the ONS occurred as a response to various abiotic and biotic environmental factors. It is thought that the ontogenetic niche shift could be an adaptive response to changing conditions in an individual's habitat. Authors of the life history theory predicted that organisms can affect the time of their ontogenetic niche shifting. While individuals living in favorable conditions would usually delay their ONS to a successive ecological niche, organisms living in a niche with poor conditions typically advance to a further niche.

Understanding the ontogenetic niche shifting in different species and its impact on the whole community is important when studying biodiversity and ecosystem functioning. It is thought to be useful when dealing with populations threatened by anthropogenic disturbances and environmental changes.

== Representative taxa ==
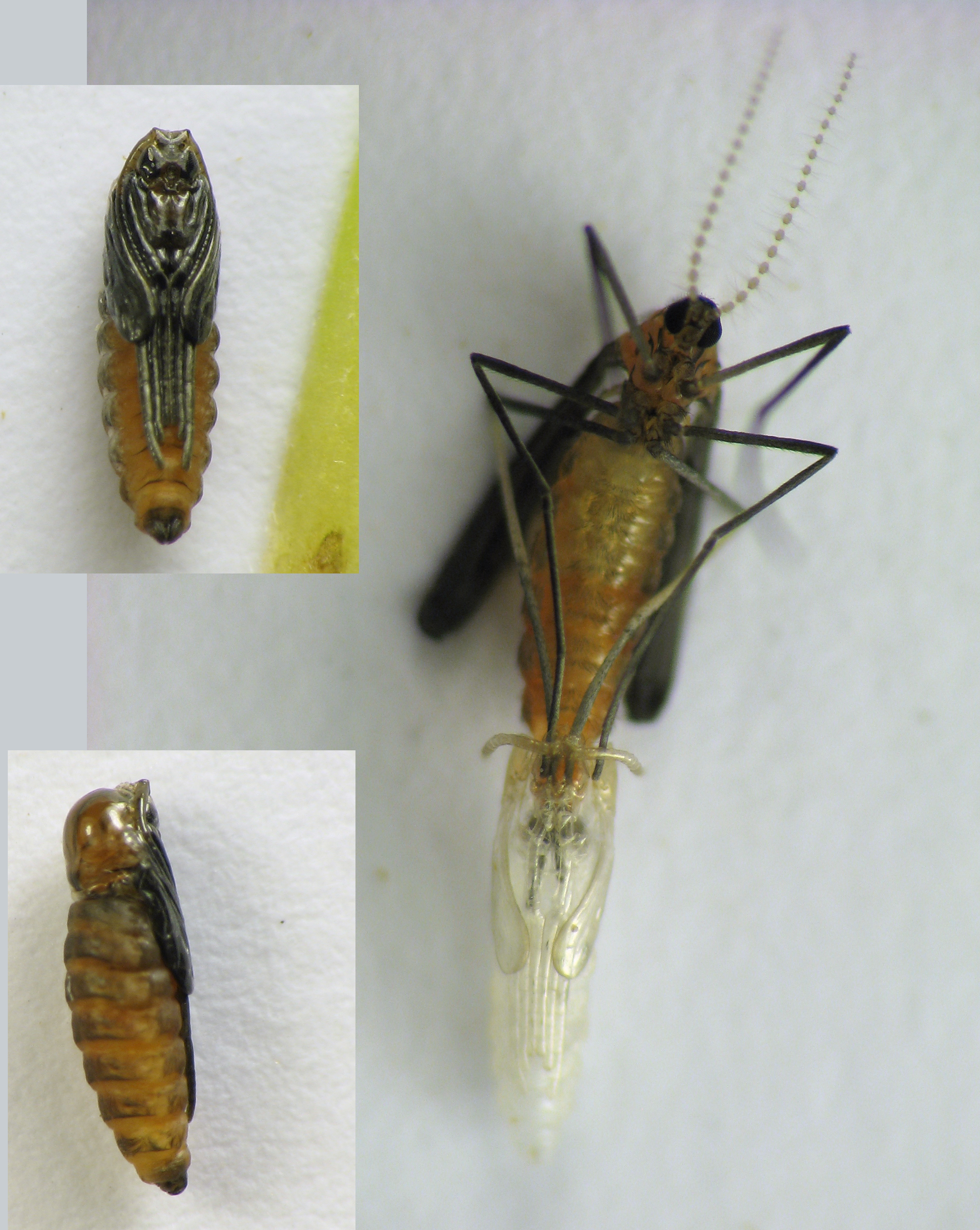
The extreme ONS can be seen among insects. On the picture above are shown a pupa and an imago of Rhopalomyia solidaginis.

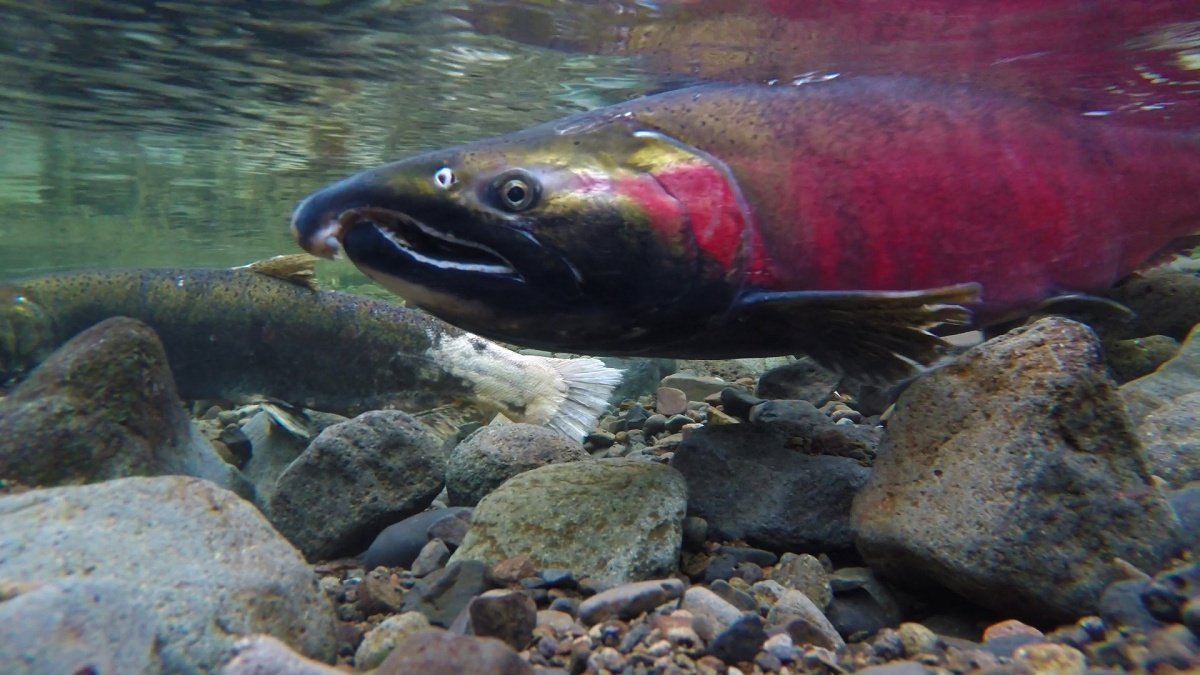
Pacific salmon (Oncorhynchus) is an anadromous fish species that exhibits a drastic habitat niche shift.

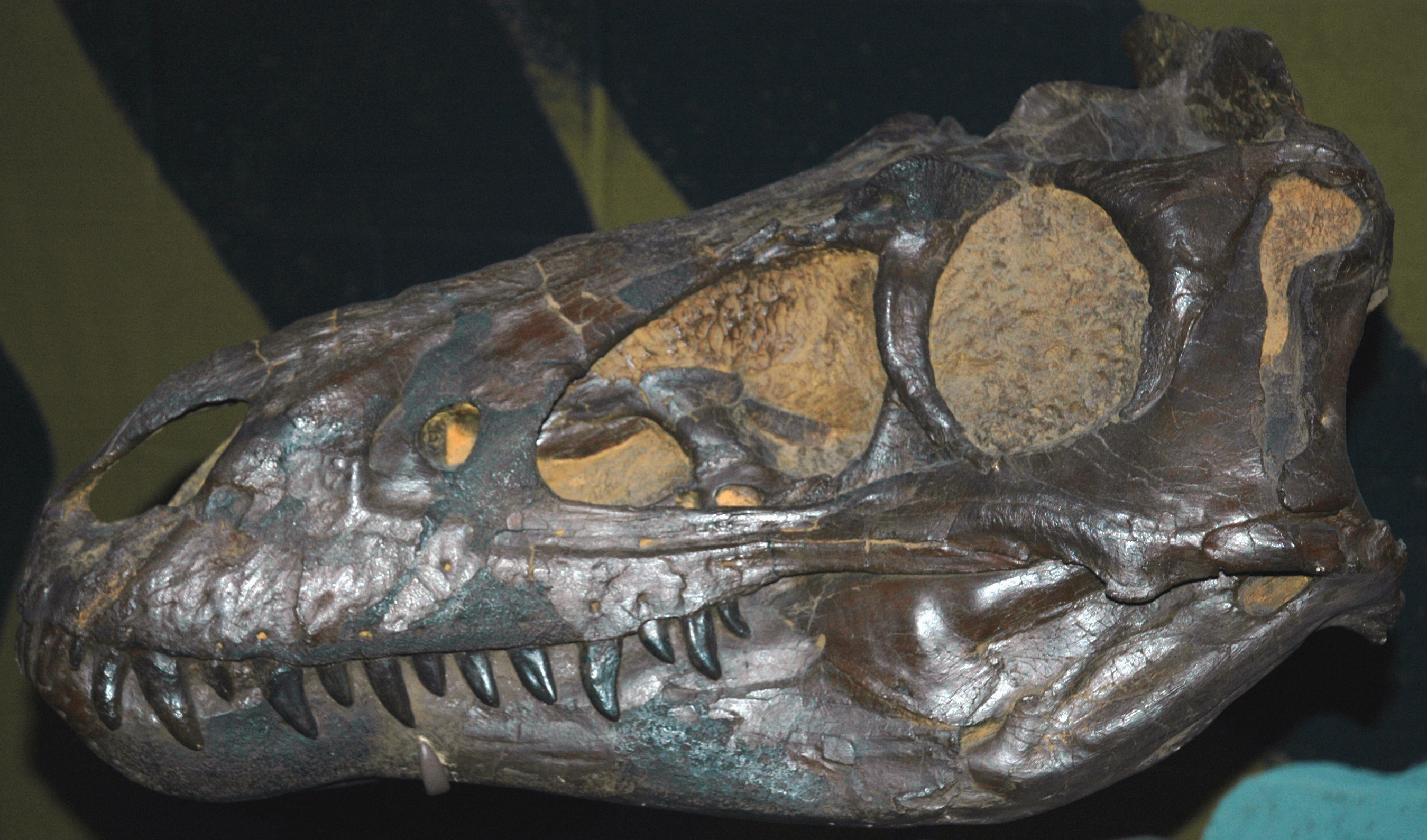
Skull of a juvenile Tyrannosaurus. Juveniles of megatheropods proposedly occupied the mesocarnivoran ecological niche.

Even though the occurrence of ontogenetic niche shifting is thought to be widely distributed, the best known representative taxa with extensively studied ONS are insects and a few groups of vertebrates, especially fish and amphibians, where individuals often change their habitat as well as a lot of other aspects of their niche during the development. The less pronounced ontogenetic niche shifting can be seen in many other taxa, where their habitat stays the same. Usually the ONS in those species is evident when looking at the resources being used by organisms of the same species, but which are of various ages or size classes (for example, a change in their diet).

=== Invertebrates ===
The ontogenetic niche shifting, which is connected with extreme habitat changes, can be seen among insects. Individuals of the taxon Insecta are known to exhibit one of the various types of metamorphosis, the best studied being hemimetabolism (where an insect passes three life stages; egg, nymph and imago) and holometabolism (characterized with four life stages of an insect; egg, larva, pupa and imago). Nutritional niches and their shifting during an ontogeny can be accurately measured by using a stable isotopic signature of animals. Such a method has been used in studying the ONS in gastropods, such as field slugs.

=== Vertebrates ===
The ONS similar to that among insects happens in amphibian taxa, the best known being frogs, which start as an egg and then hatch into a larval stage called the tadpole. Tadpoles exhibit many differences that distinguish them from the adult stage of a frog; most species' tadpoles are aquatic, they usually possess external gills, and primarily feed on plant material (though there are some exceptions that consume dead animal flesh or a mixed diet). Another well studied example of the ONS occurs in fish that exhibit diadromous behaviour. Diadromous fish species drastically change their habitat when they set out on a journey from sea (saltwater) to rivers (freshwater), and vice versa. A lot of freshwater fish species show the ONS in their diet, when they switch from preying on plankton to performing benthivory.

The ONS may not be so visible in reptiles, though these vertebrates do utilize it. The ontogenetic niche shift was studied in American alligator (Alligator mississippiensis), which is ideal for studying ecological aspects of ONS because of the many distinct size stages in a population. Alligators were switching their habitat niche between hydrologically isolated, seasonal wetlands and riverine systems. The study has shown that riverine systems were populated primarily with adults and subadults of both sexes, who used the area as a non-nesting habitat. On the other hand, juveniles and adult females were found on seasonal wetlands, which served as a nursery and nesting sites respectively.

A good example of the ONS in birds are big seabirds, such as albatrosses, which spend some of their time as fully oceanic birds and when sexually mature begin to visit breeding grounds. Immature juveniles usually stay in subtropical water, where they occupy high trophic levels. Researchers noticed that young birds progressively direct towards lower trophic positions when they are coming closer to sexual maturity. After some time, they take on the isotopic niche of an adult bird.

The ontogenetic niche shift is a concept widely studied in paleontology and paleozoology. Large non-avian dinosaurs are known to have had exhibited one of the most intensive forms of ontogenetic niche shifting, as they were hatched from an egg and had to experience very significant size shifts during their ontogeny. One of the problems, connected with understanding Mesozoic dinosaur fauna, was a lack of so-called mesocarnivores. It is predicted the ontogenetic niche shift is an answer, because carnivorous dinosaurs started out as small hatchlings and progressed towards adult size, while occupying different successive niches and limiting trophic species diversity. Juvenile individuals of megatheropods are thought to occupy the mesocarnivore niche.

=== Plants ===
The ontogenetic niche shift is primarily studied in animals, but there are some studies that deal with the ONS in plants. One of the ONSes studied in plants is the changing of a regeneration niche. Authors of the paper noticed that during the ontogeny, the regeneration niche of Acer opalus (the Italian maple) had shrunk. It is thought such an ontogenetic niche shift was mainly a consequence of herbivory, the depth of the litter layer, and presence of other plants (especially adult trees and shrubs).

== See also ==
- Life history theory
- Niche differentiation
- Alternative stable state
