= Deretaphrus =

Scientific classification
- Domain: Eukaryota
- Kingdom: Animalia
- Phylum: Arthropoda
- Class: Insecta
- Order: Coleoptera
- Suborder: Polyphaga
- Infraorder: Cucujiformia
- Family: Bothrideridae
- Tribe: Deretaphrini
- Genus: Deretaphrus; Newman, 1842

Type species
- Deretaphrus fossus Newman, 1842

Species
- See text

Genus of beetles

Deretaphrus is a genus of dry bark beetles in the family Bothrideridae. A taxonomic revision of the genus published in 2013 listed 25 species, which exhibit a disjunct distribution. There are 22 species of the genus described from Australia, with single species also being found in each of New Caledonia, Bolivia, and North America.

== Taxonomy ==
The genus Deretaphrus was erected by Edward Newman in 1842, when he described four new species of beetle from specimens that had been collected in Port Phillip, Australia, which was then part of New South Wales. Of these four species, the first listed, D. fossus, became the type of the genus. The other species initially assigned to the genus, D. puteus, D. illusus and D. vittatus, were subsequently moved out of Deretaphrus, initially to the genus Bothrideres.

== Life cycle ==
=== Larva ===
The beetles in this genus have ectoparasitic larvae, the first instar being a mobile planidium, which is adapted to locate suitable hosts. Later instars have a more typical beetle-grub morphology and are typically found under tree bark, feeding on cerambycid and buprestid woodboring beetle grubs. The final larval instar spins a silken cocoon in which to pupate: an unusual character among beetles. Which part of the larva secretes the silk has not been determined, and it could come from the mouth or from anal glands.

=== Adult ===
Adults are most often found under tree bark, or on its outer surface at night, but have also been collected at light traps. Examination of their gut contents suggests that their diet consists of plant material.

== Distribution ==
Species of the genus Deretaphrus are principally found in Australia.

In 1872 George Henry Horn described D. oregonensis from North America. Appended to his formal description is a note describing his initial disbelief that the first specimen of the species that he had been sent was actually, as claimed, from California.

A specimen was received several years since from California, but from a source whence Australian species had been sent, and little credit was therefore given to the authenticity of the locality, especially as all the known species were Australian. Lately, however, another has been attained free from any suspicion of error, and I have therefore ventured to name it.

By the time he made his description, Horn was aware that John Lawrence LeConte and Thomas de Grey, 6th Baron Walsingham were in possession of specimens of D. oregonensis that had undoubtedly been collected in America. The species has since been found in a number of states to the west of the Rockies, and in British Columbia, ranging from the Pacific Northwest to California.

In 1903 Antoine Henri Grouvelle described D. interruptus from New Caledonia.

A South American species was added to the genus in 2013 when Lord and McHugh described D. boliviensis, on the basis of a single specimen that had been collected in Bolivia.

Lord and McHugh describe this disjunct distribution as "very odd", and suggest that D. boliviensis may have a wider distribution in South and Central America.

== Species list ==
The following were treated as species by Nathan P. Lord and Joseph V. McHugh in their 2013 revision of the genus:

- D. aequaliceps Blackburn, 1903
- D. alveolens Carter and Zeck, 1937
- D. analis Lea, 1898
- D. antennatus Lord and McHugh, 2013
- D. boliviensis Lord and McHugh, 2013
- D. bucculentus Elston, 1923
- D. carinatus Lord and McHugh, 2013
- D. erichsoni Newman, 1855
- D. fossus Newman, 1842
- D. gracilis Blackburn, 1903
- D. hoplites Lord and McHugh, 2013
- D. ignarus Pascoe, 1862
- D. incultus Carter and Zeck, 1937
- D. interruptus Grouvelle, 1903
- D. iridescens Blackburn, 1903
- D. lateropunctatus Lord and McHugh, 2013
- D. ocularis Lord and McHugh, 2013
- D. oregonensis Horn, 1872
- D. parviceps Lea, 1898
- D. piceus (Germar, 1848)
- D. puncticollis Lea, 1898
- D. rodmani Lord and McHugh, 2013
- D. viduatus Pascoe, 1862
- D. wollastoni Newman, 1855
- D. xanthorrhoeae Lea, 1898

Lord and McHugh list three morphotypes, all from Australia, that could not be determined according to the above list, but were not described as new species for lack of sufficient material.

== Sources ==
- Lord, Nathan P. & McHugh, Joseph V. (2013). "A taxonomic revision of the genus Deretaphrus Newman, 1842 (Coleoptera: Cucujoidea: Bothrideridae)". Coleopterists Society Monographs. 67 (12): 1–107. doi:10.1649/072.067.0mo4.1. JSTOR 24773433.
