= Hypermetamorphosis =

High variability forms of complete metamorphosis

Hypermetamorphosis, or heteromorphosis, is a term used mainly in entomology; it refers to a class of variants of holometabolism, that is to say, complete insect metamorphosis. Hypermetamorphosis is exceptional in that some instars, usually larval instars, are functionally and visibly distinct from the rest. The differences between such instars usually reflect transient stages in the life cycle; for instance, one instar might be mobile while it searches for its food supply, while the following instar immediately sheds its locomotory organs and settles down to feed until it is fully grown and ready to change into the reproductive stage, which in turn, does not have the same nutritional requirements as the larvae.

== Description ==
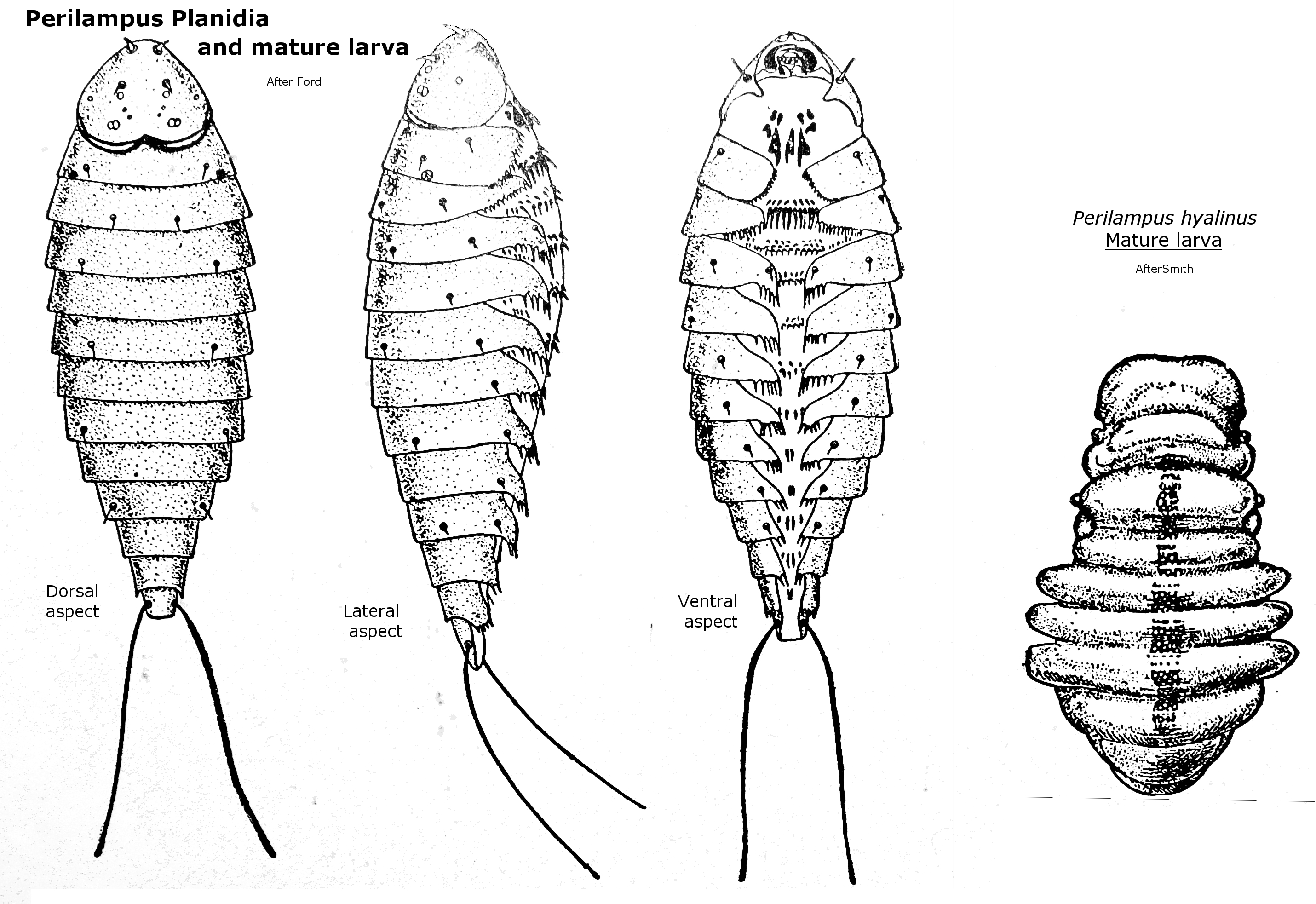
These planidia are fairly typical of certain species of parasitoid wasps, in this case the genus Perilampus.

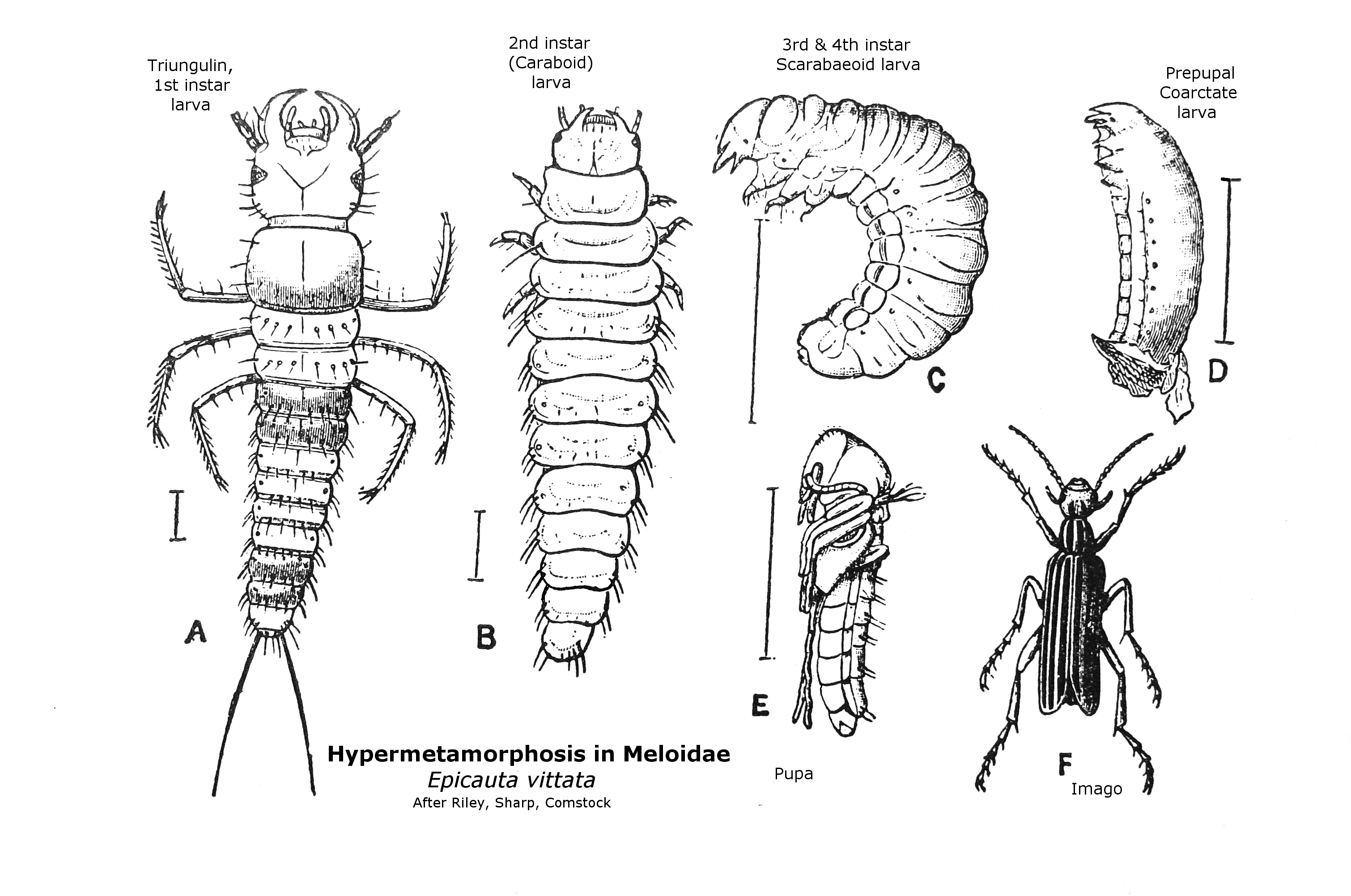
Hypermetamorphosis in Meloidae. This form of planidium is a typical triungulin and feeds in its first instar. In its second instar it turns into a less triungulin-like form, and feeds again. It then turns into the Scarabaeoid form for two or more instars, depending on species. After that it adopts pre-pupal forms, pupates, and finally emerges as an adult beetle.

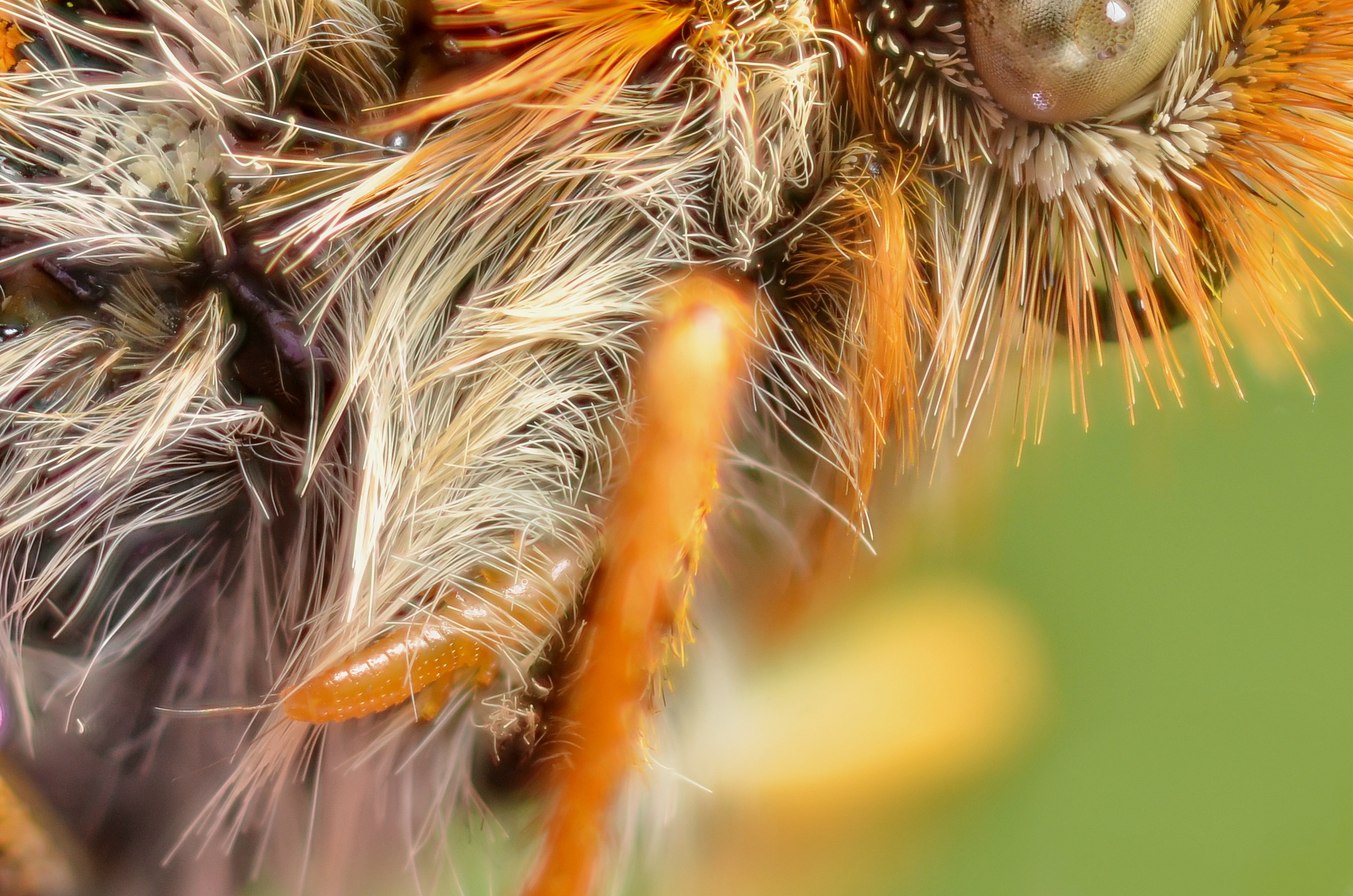
Triungulin on a butterfly. This probably is an example of phoresy rather than parasitism.

Hypermetamorphosis, as the term normally is used in entomology, refers to a class of variants of holometabolism. In hypermetamorphosis some larval instars are functionally and morphologically distinct from each other.

The general case in holometabolous insects such as flies, moths, or wasps, is that all larval stages look similar, growing larger as the insect matures. In hypermetamorphic insects however, at least one instar, usually the first, differs markedly from the rest. In many hypermetamorphic species, the first instars are numerous, tiny, very mobile larvae that must find their way to a food source. The general term for a mobile first instar is a planidium, from the Greek language πλάνος (planos) meaning "roaming".

In typical examples the first-instar larval morphology is campodeiform (meaning: elongated, flattened, and active, more or less resembling the morphology of hexapods in the genus Campodea). There is however, considerable variety in the forms of planidia that occur in various families and orders; in the beetle family Meloidae, the three-clawed planidium originally was called a triungulin, and similar planidia for example, those of the Strepsiptera, may also be called triungula.

In their planidial form, many species do not feed; they then molt into a form suited to eating rather than seeking out food. The second instar is completely different in appearance and behavior, often becoming grub- or maggot-like in the instars before pupation. As a rule, the instars after the first ecdysis are of more or less constant form and not highly mobile, being specialised for feeding and growth until the final larval instar metamorphoses into the pupal form.

The moth family Gracillariidae is an unusual case of hypermetamorphosis in that its first few larval instars do feed, but differently to later instars. Specifically, early instars feed on plant sap (and for this reason have modified mandibles) while later instars feed on plant tissue. Furthermore, instead of becoming less mobile during the larval stage, larvae become more mobile, with early instars lacking legs while later instars possess legs.

There are examples of holometabolic species in which there are certain striking differences between the earliest instars and the later instars, though without their generally being regarded as hypermetamorphic. For example, early instars of many Papilionidae are of a colour, shape and texture that suggest bird droppings; later instars that are larger and would simply stand out in such camouflage, typically become green. The prepupa or last larval instar of insects ceases to feed and (in some cases) searches for a place to pupate, but this also is not considered hypermetamorphosis.

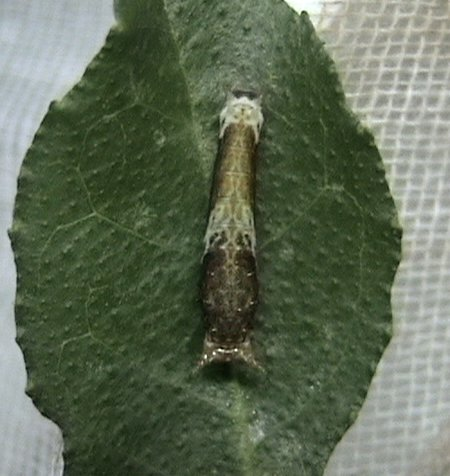
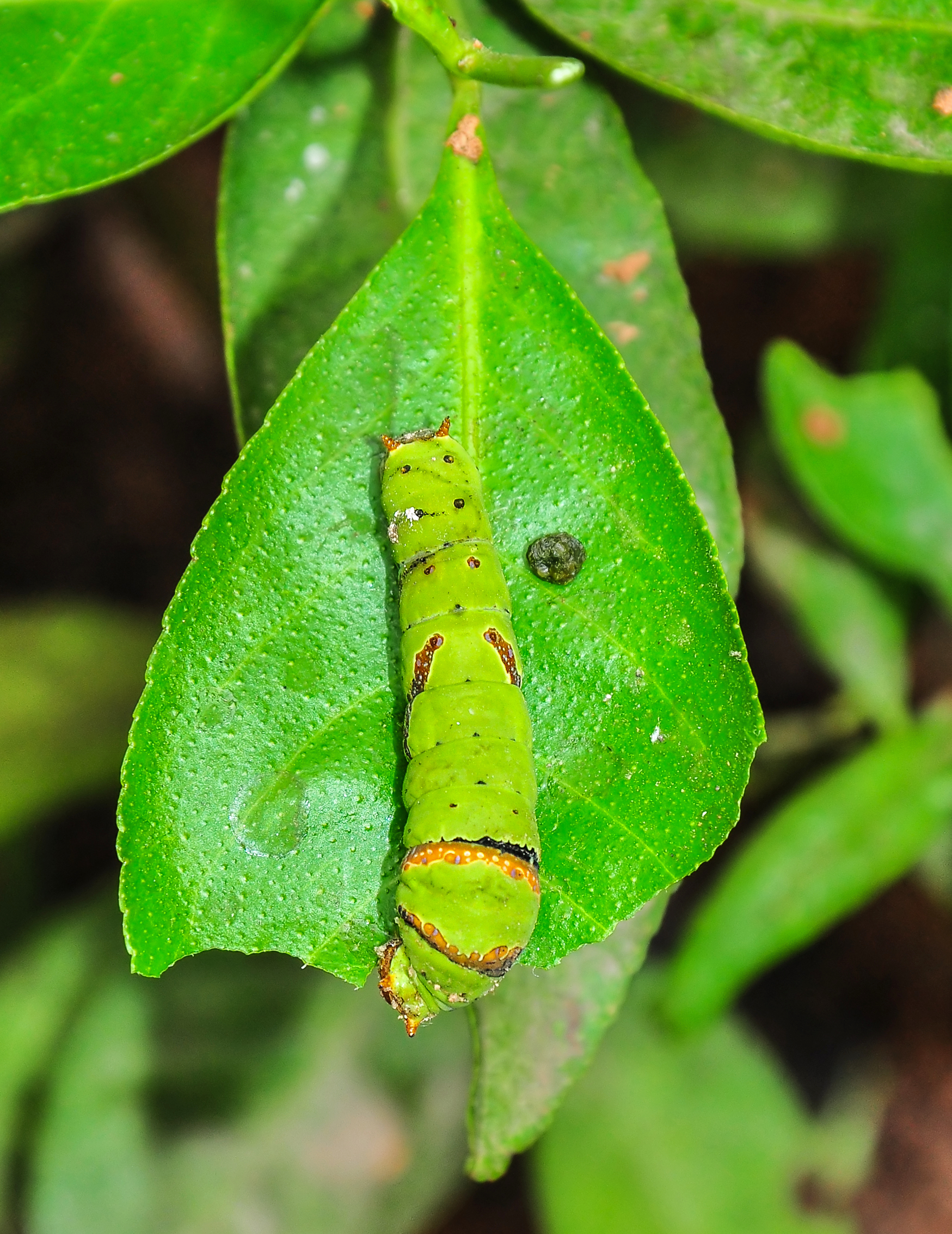
Early instars of Papilio polytes (left) resemble a bird dropping, while the late ones (right) are too big to do so, and are simply camouflaged as a leaf. This striking coloration difference between the instars is generally not regarded as hypermetamorphosis.

== Various forms of hypermetamorphosis ==
Hypermetamorphosis usually occurs as an adaptation of the ontogeny of certain parasitoid insects, notably:

- the beetle families Meloidae and Ripiphoridae,
- the order Strepsiptera,
- the moth families Gracillariidae and Epipyropidae,
- flies in the families Acroceridae, Bombyliidae and Nemestrinidae,
- the Neuropteran family Mantispidae, and
- the parasitic wasp family Eucharitidae.

Technically, the subimago of the Ephemeroptera might be described as a stage in a form of hypermetamorphosis, but that is not common practice.

Examples of hypermetamorphosis in any given insect order are analogous and not homologous to those in any other order; for example, hypermetamorphosis in the Acroceridae was not derived from the Strepsiptera.

== See also ==
- Developmental biology – Study of how organisms develop and grow
- Direct development – Growth to adulthood without metamorphosis
- Gosner stage – System of describing stages of development in anurans
- Metamorphosis – Profound change in body structure during the postembryonic development of an organism
- Morphogenesis – Biological process that causes an organism to develop its shape
- Planidium – Form of insect larva
