= Bothrideres arizonicus =

Scientific classification
- Kingdom: Animalia
- Phylum: Arthropoda
- Clade: Pancrustacea
- Class: Insecta
- Order: Coleoptera
- Suborder: Polyphaga
- Infraorder: Cucujiformia
- Family: Bothrideridae
- Genus: Bothrideres
- Species: B. arizonicus

Binomial name
- Bothrideres arizonicus Casey, 1924

Species of beetle

Bothrideres arizonicus is a species of beetle in Bothrideridae family. The scientific name of the species was published by Thomas Casey in 1924.
