= Sosylus extensus =

Scientific classification
- Kingdom: Animalia
- Phylum: Arthropoda
- Class: Insecta
- Order: Coleoptera
- Suborder: Polyphaga
- Infraorder: Cucujiformia
- Family: Bothrideridae
- Genus: Sosylus
- Species: S. extensus

Binomial name
- Sosylus extensus Casey, 1897

Species of beetle

Sosylus extensus is a species of dry bark beetle in the family Bothrideridae. It is found in North America.
