= Bothrideres montanus =

Scientific classification
- Kingdom: Animalia
- Phylum: Arthropoda
- Class: Insecta
- Order: Coleoptera
- Suborder: Polyphaga
- Infraorder: Cucujiformia
- Family: Bothrideridae
- Genus: Bothrideres
- Species: B. montanus

Binomial name
- Bothrideres montanus Horn, 1878

Species of beetle

Bothrideres montanus is a species of dry bark beetle in the family Bothrideridae. It is found in North America.
