= Metamorphosis =

Profound change in body structure during the postembryonic development of an organism

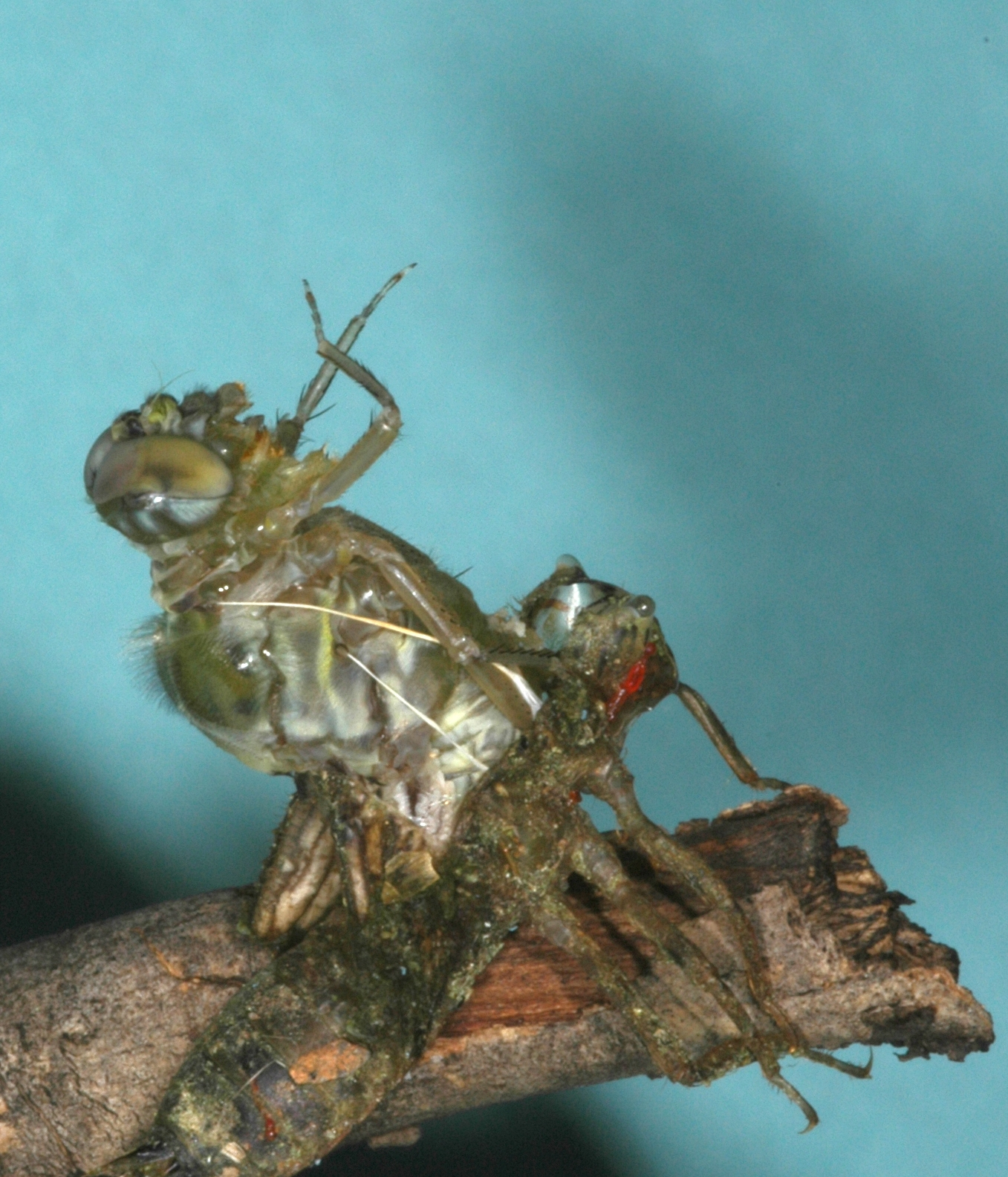
A dragonfly undergoing the final moult of its metamorphosis; in this process it transforms from its nymphal form to its adult stage

Metamorphosis is a biological process in which an animal undergoes a conspicuous and relatively abrupt change in its body structure as part of its development. Some insects, fish, amphibians, mollusks, crustaceans, cnidarians, echinoderms, and tunicates undergo metamorphosis, often accompanied by a change of nutrition or behavior. Some animal species undergo complete metamorphosis ("holometaboly") between radically different lifecycle stages; others have incomplete metamorphosis ("hemimetaboly") between somewhat similar stages, or no metamorphosis ("ametaboly"). Organisms with larval stages undergo metamorphosis to the adult stage.

== Etymology ==
The word metamorphosis derives from Ancient Greek μεταμόρφωσις, "transformation, transforming", from μετα- (meta-), "after" and μορφή (morphe), "form".

== Hormonal control ==
In insects, growth and metamorphosis are controlled by hormones synthesized by endocrine glands near the front of the body (anterior). Neurosecretory cells in an insect's brain secrete a hormone, the prothoracicotropic hormone (PTTH) that activates prothoracic glands, which secrete a second hormone, usually ecdysone (an ecdysteroid), that induces ecdysis (shedding of the exoskeleton). PTTH also stimulates the corpora allata, a retrocerebral organ, to produce juvenile hormone, which prevents the development of adult characteristics during ecdysis. In holometabolous insects, molts between larval instars have a high level of juvenile hormone, the moult to the pupal stage has a low level of juvenile hormone, and the final, or imaginal, molt has no juvenile hormone present at all. Experiments on firebugs have shown how juvenile hormone can affect the number of nymph instar stages in hemimetabolous insects.

== Insects ==
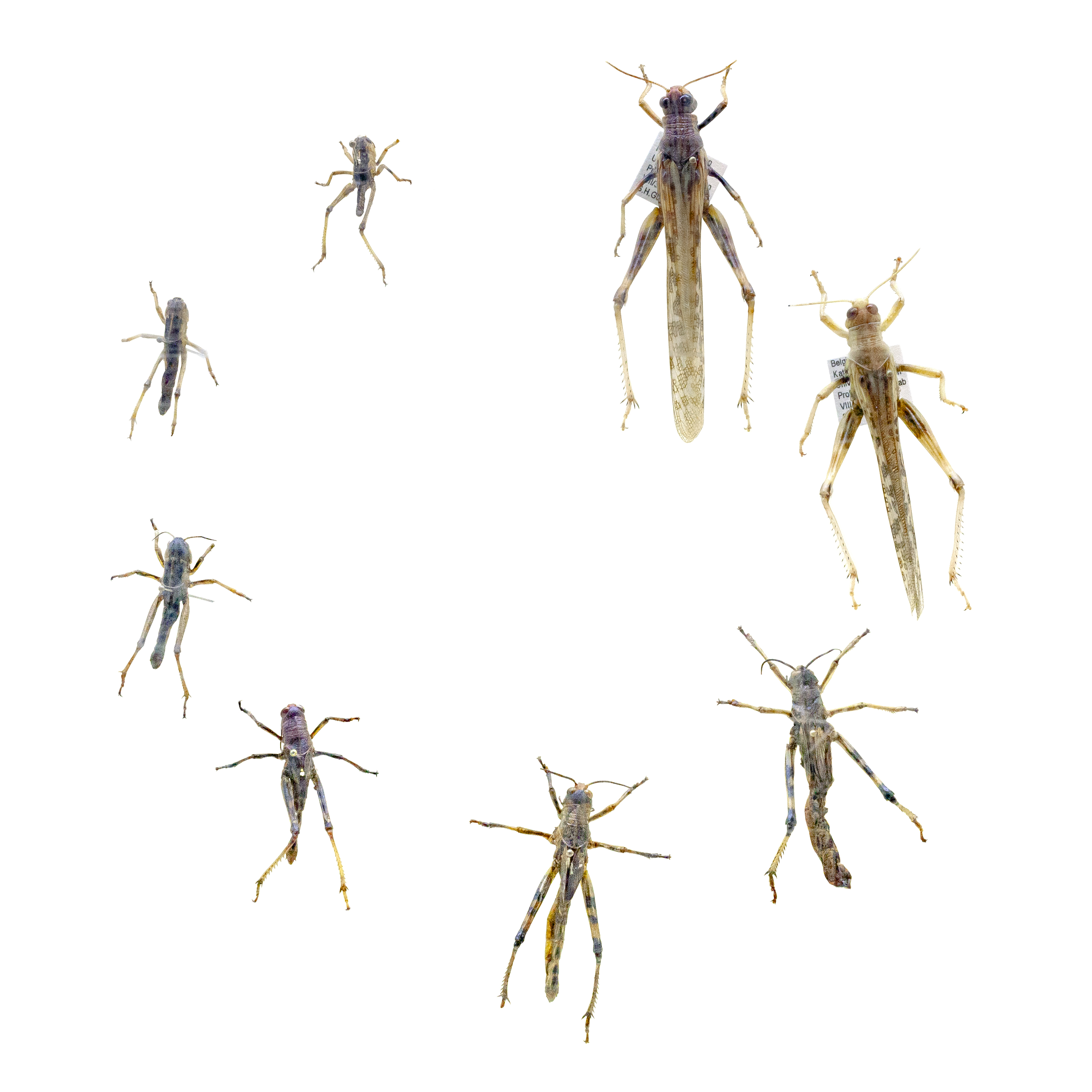
Incomplete metamorphosis in the grasshopper with different instar nymphs. The largest specimen is adult.

All three categories of metamorphosis can be found in the diversity of insects, including no metamorphosis ("ametabolism"), incomplete or partial metamorphosis ("Hemimetabolism"), and complete metamorphosis ("holometabolism"). While ametabolous insects show very little difference between larval and adult forms (also known as "direct development"), both hemimetabolous and holometabolous insects have significant morphological and behavioral differences between larval and adult forms, the most significant being the inclusion, in holometabolous organisms, of a pupal or resting stage between the larval and adult forms.

=== Development and terminology ===
Two types of metamorphosis are shown. In a complete (holometabolous) metamorphosis the insect passes through four distinct phases, which produce an adult that does not resemble the larva. In an incomplete (hemimetabolous) metamorphosis an insect does not go through a full transformation, but instead transitions from a nymph to an adult by molting its exoskeleton as it grows.

In hemimetabolous insects, immature stages are called nymphs. Development proceeds in repeated stages of growth and ecdysis (moulting); these stages are called instars. The juvenile forms closely resemble adults, but are smaller and lack adult features such as wings and genitalia. The size and morphological differences between nymphs in different instars are small, often just differences in body proportions and the number of segments; in later instars, external wing buds form. The period from one molt to the next is called a stadium.

In holometabolous insects, immature stages are called larvae and differ markedly from adults. Insects which undergo holometabolism pass through a larval stage, then enter an inactive state called pupa (called a "chrysalis" in butterfly species), and finally emerge as adults.

=== Evolution ===
The earliest insect forms showed direct development (ametabolism), and the evolution of metamorphosis in insects is thought to have fuelled their dramatic radiation (1,2). Some early ametabolous "true insects" are still present today, such as bristletails and silverfish. Hemimetabolous insects include cockroaches, grasshoppers, dragonflies, and true bugs. Phylogenetically, all insects in the Pterygota undergo a marked change in form, texture and physical appearance from immature stage to adult. These insects either have hemimetabolous development, and undergo an incomplete or partial metamorphosis, or holometabolous development, which undergo a complete metamorphosis, including a pupal or resting stage between the larval and adult forms.

A number of hypotheses have been proposed to explain the evolution of holometaboly from hemimetaboly, mostly centering on whether or not the intermediate stages of hemimetabolous forms are homologous in origin to the pupal stage of holometabolous forms.

=== Temperature-dependent metamorphosis ===
According to a 2009 study, temperature plays an important role in insect development as individual species are found to have specific thermal windows that allow them to progress through their developmental stages. These windows are not significantly affected by ecological traits, rather, the windows are phylogenetically adapted to the ecological circumstances insects are living in.

=== Development ===
In a 2008 study, tobacco hornworm caterpillars (Manduca sexta) trained to avoid a particular odour during their final larval stage continued to avoid it as adult moths after metamorphosis.

Programmed cell death is involved in embryogenesis, and metamorphosis. Both autophagy and apoptosis, the two ways programmed cell death occur, are processes undergone during insect metamorphosis.

Sequence illustrating complete metamorphosis in the cabbage white butterfly, Pieris rapae

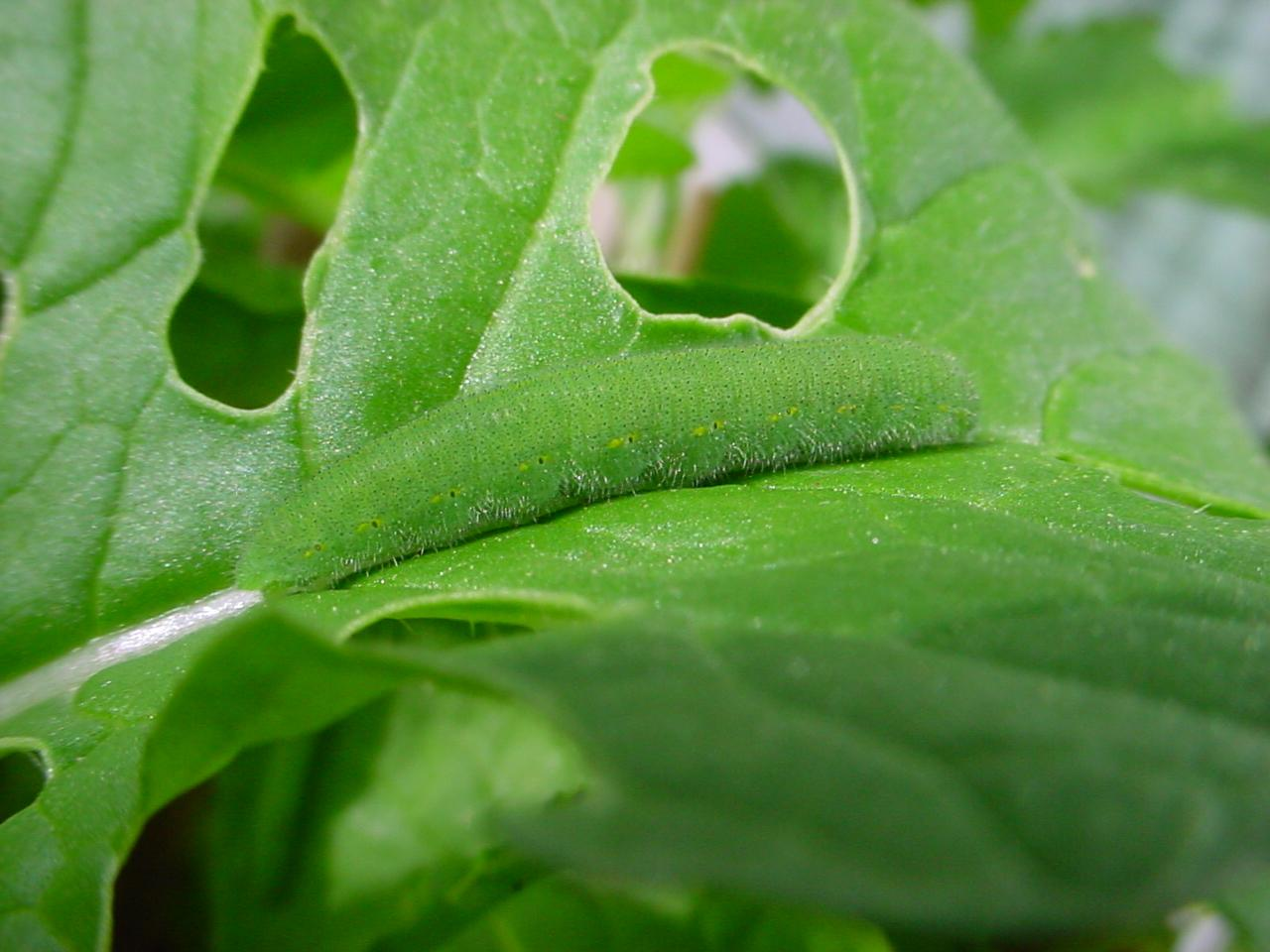
larva

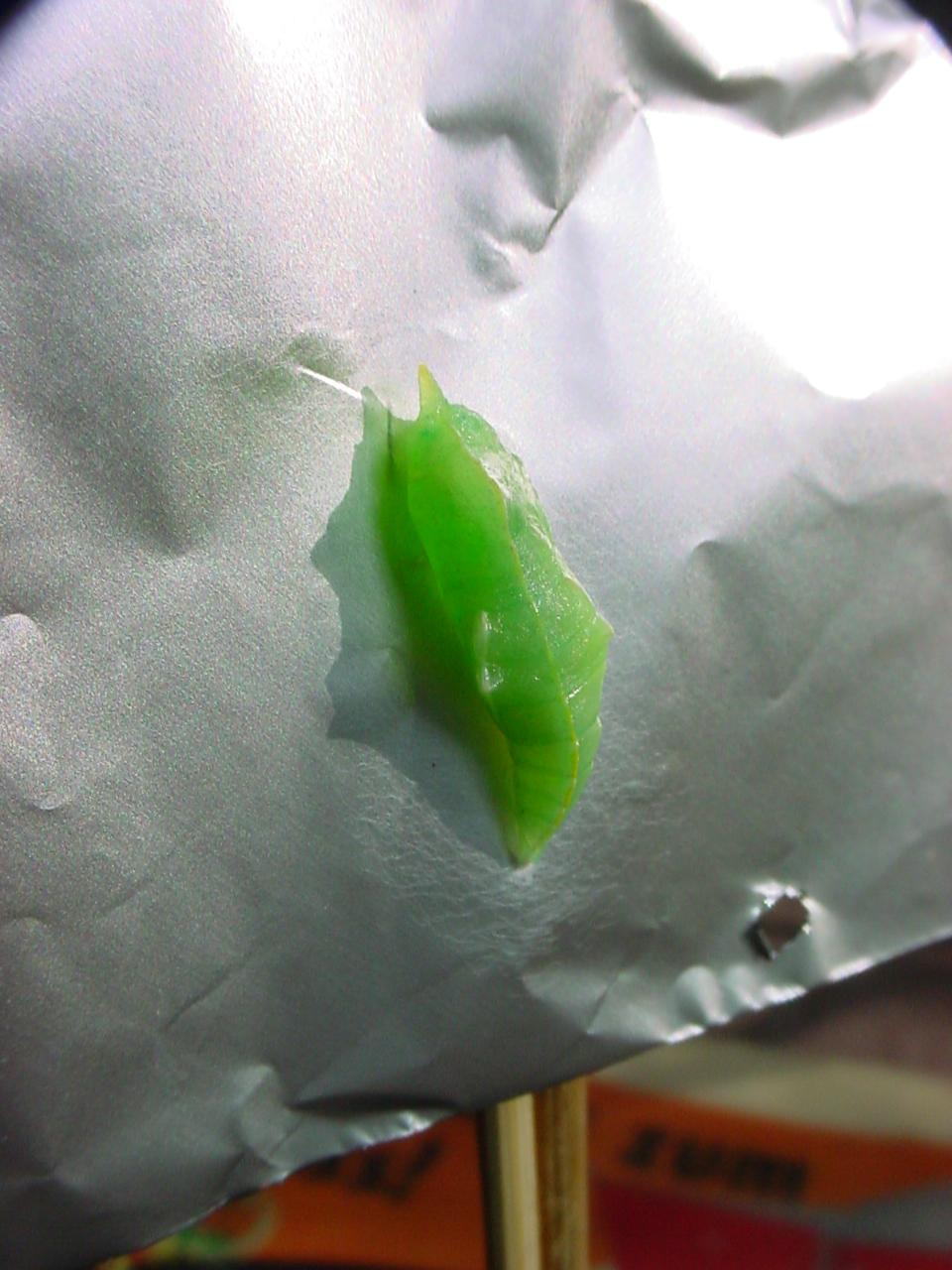
pupa

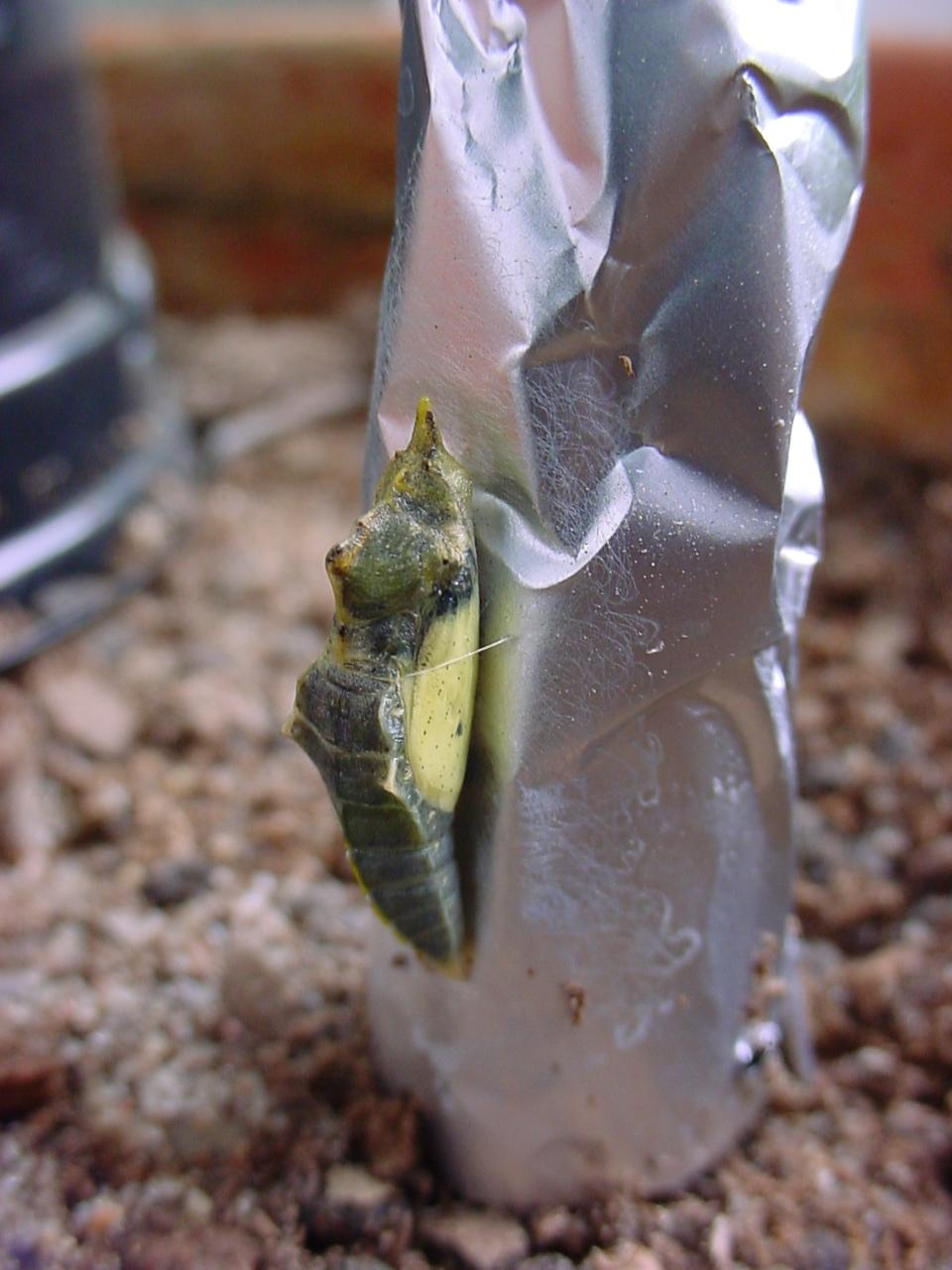
pupa ready for eclosion

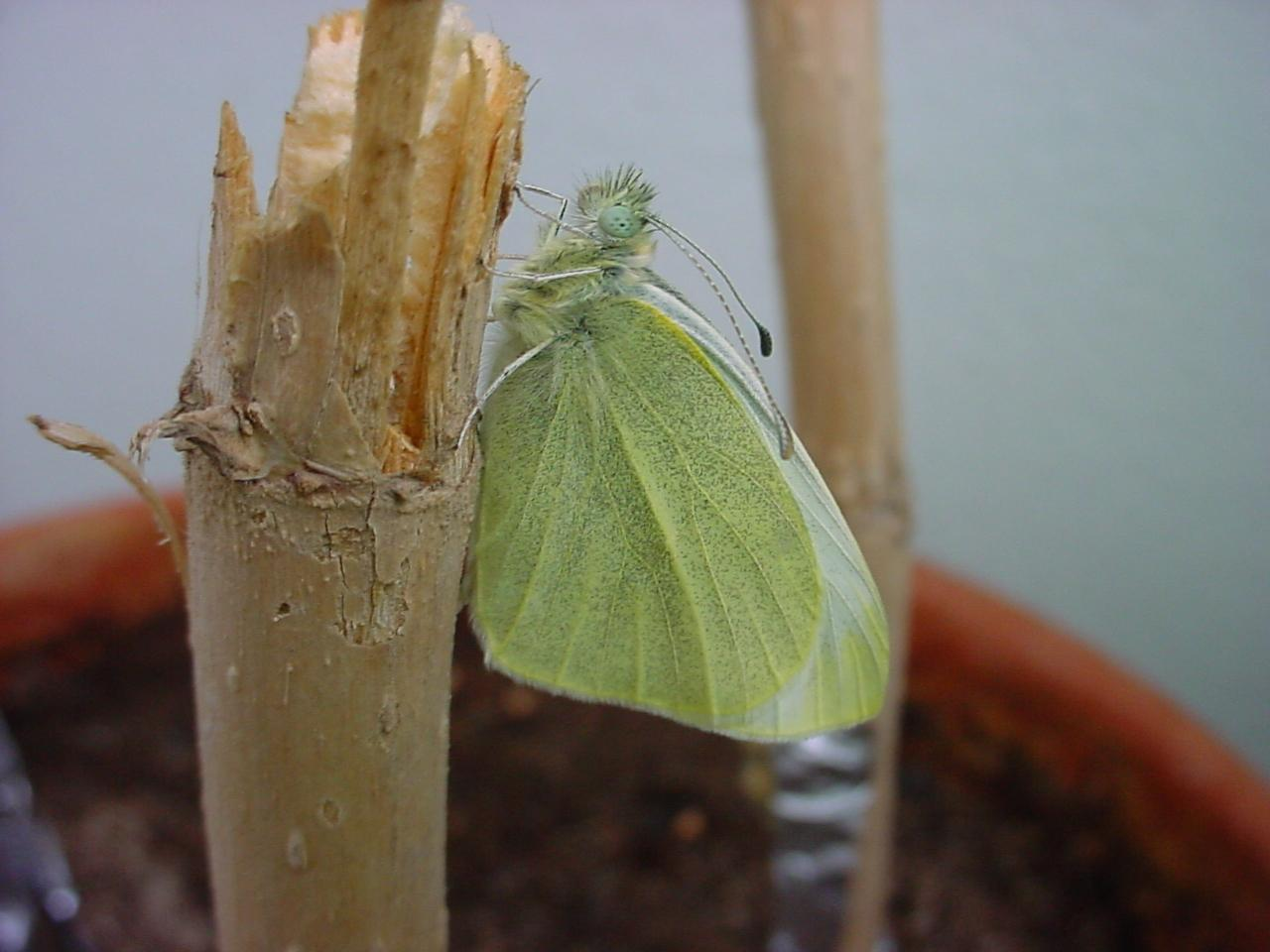
adult

== Chordata ==
=== Amphioxus ===
In Cephalochordata, metamorphosis is induced by iodothyronines like triiodothyroacetic acid, and iodothyronine-induced metamorphosis could be an ancestral feature of all chordates.

=== Fish ===
Some fish, both bony fish (Osteichthyes) and jawless fish (Agnatha), undergo metamorphosis. Fish metamorphosis is typically under strong control by the thyroid hormone.

Examples among the non-bony fish include the lamprey. Among the bony fish, mechanisms are varied.

The salmon is diadromous, meaning that it changes from a freshwater to a saltwater lifestyle.

Many species of flatfish begin their life bilaterally symmetrical, with an eye on either side of the body; but one eye moves to join the other side of the fish – which becomes the upper side – in the adult form.

The European eel has a number of metamorphoses, from the larval stage to the leptocephalus stage, then a quick metamorphosis to glass eel at the edge of the continental shelf (eight days for the Japanese eel), two months at the border of fresh and salt water where the glass eel undergoes a quick metamorphosis into elver, then a long stage of growth followed by a more gradual metamorphosis to the migrating phase. In the pre-adult freshwater stage, the eel also has phenotypic plasticity because fish-eating eels develop very wide mandibles, making the head look blunt. Leptocephali are common, occurring in all Elopomorpha (tarpon- and eel-like fish).

Most other bony fish undergo metamorphosis initially from egg to immotile larvae known as sac fry (fry with a yolk sac), then to motile larvae (often known as fingerlings due to them roughly reaching the length of a human finger) that have to forage for themselves after the yolk sac resorbs, and then to the juvenile stage where the fish progressively start to resemble adult morphology and behaviors until finally reaching sexual maturity.

=== Tetrapods ===
==== Fossil groups ====
The extinct temnospondyls and their modern amphibian descendants, as well as some seymouriamorphs are known to have undergone metamorphosis. Because earlier tetrapodomorphs underwent direct development, and seymouriamorphs are more closely related to amniotes (which include mammals, reptiles and birds) than to temnospondyls and amphibians, it has been proposed that either: the last common ancestor of living tetrapods underwent metamorphosis, which was subsequently lost in amniotes, or that metamorphosis convergently evolved in temnospondyls and seymouriamorphs.

==== Amphibians ====
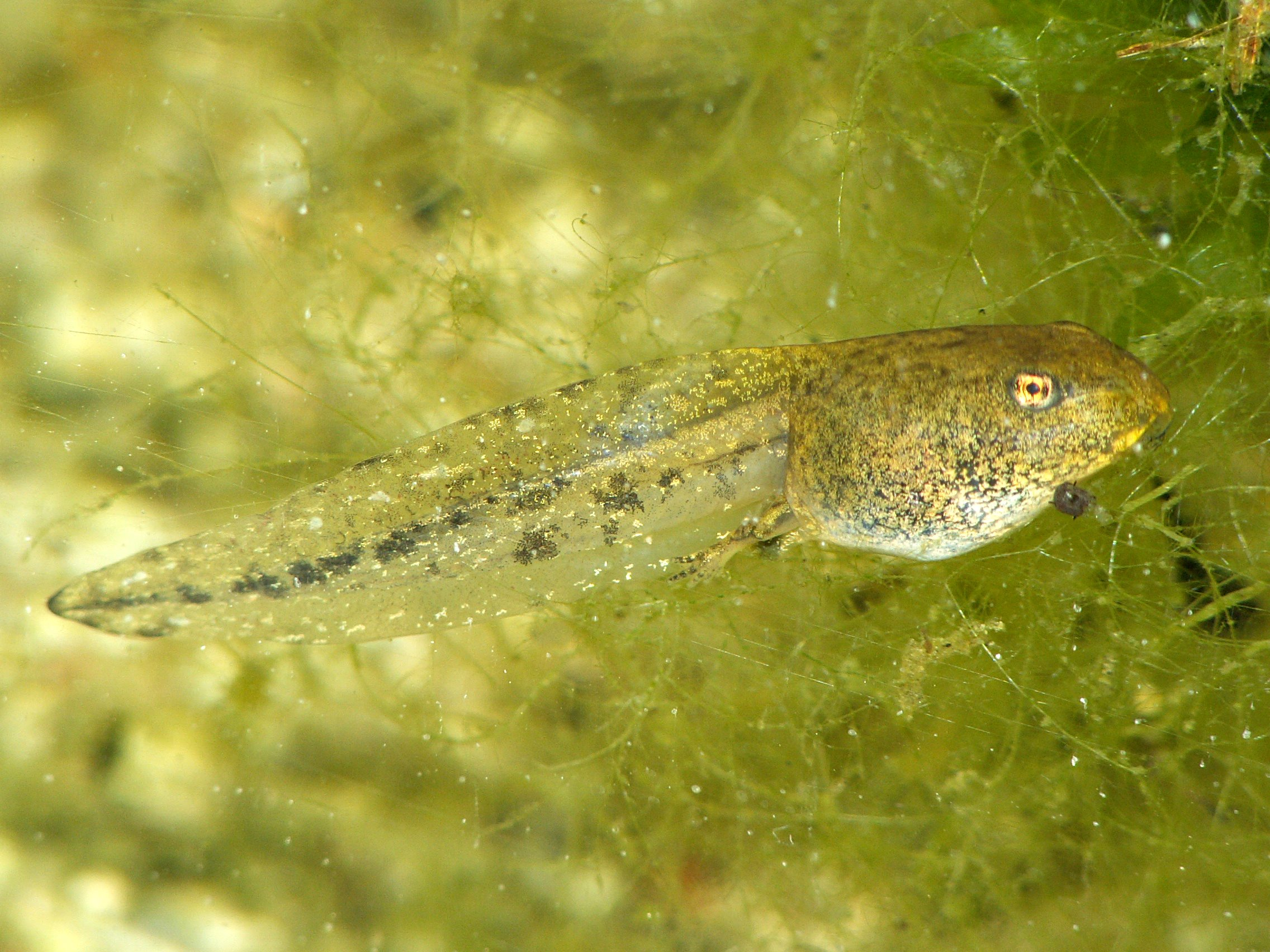
Just before metamorphosis, only 24 hours are needed to reach the stage in the next picture.

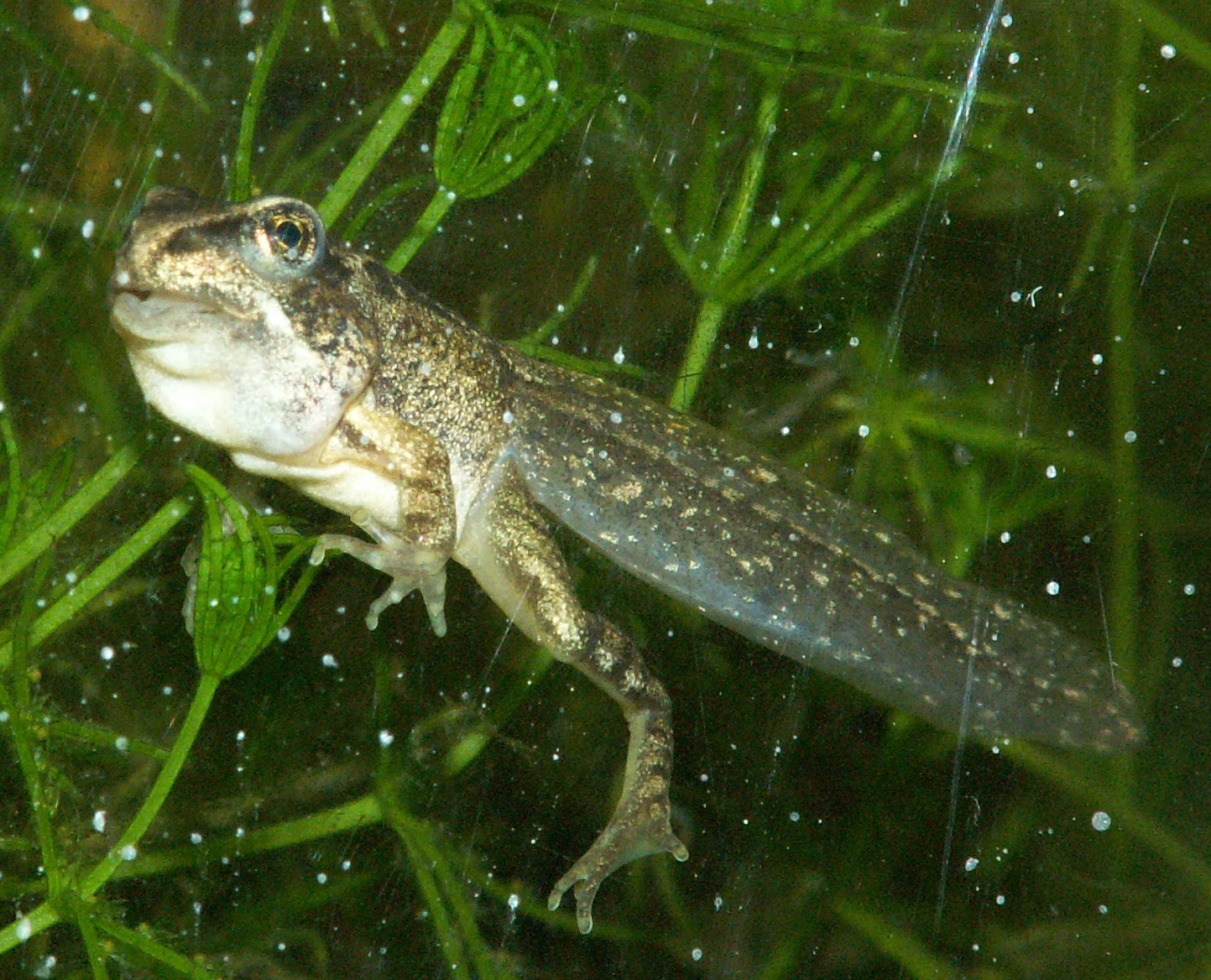
Almost functional common frog with some remains of the gill sac and a not fully developed jaw

In typical amphibian development, eggs are laid in water and larvae are adapted to an aquatic lifestyle. Frogs, toads, and newts all hatch from the eggs as larvae with external gills but it will take some time for the amphibians to interact outside with pulmonary respiration. Afterwards, newt larvae start a predatory lifestyle, while tadpoles mostly scrape food off surfaces with their horny tooth ridges.

Metamorphosis in amphibians is regulated by thyroxin concentration in the blood, which stimulates metamorphosis, and prolactin, which counteracts its effect. Specific events are dependent on threshold values for different tissues. Because most embryonic development is outside the parental body, development is subject to many adaptations due to specific ecological circumstances. For this reason tadpoles can have horny ridges for teeth, whiskers, and fins. They also make use of the lateral line organ. After metamorphosis, these organs become redundant and will be resorbed by controlled cell death, called apoptosis. The amount of adaptation to specific ecological circumstances is remarkable, with many discoveries still being made.

===== Frogs and toads =====
With frogs and toads, the external gills of the newly hatched tadpole are covered with a gill sac after a few days, and lungs are quickly formed. Front legs are formed under the gill sac, and hindlegs are visible a few days later. Following that there is usually a longer stage during which the tadpole lives off a vegetarian diet. Tadpoles use a relatively long, spiral‐shaped gut to digest that diet. Recent studies suggest tadpoles do not have a balanced homeostatic feedback control system until the beginning stages of metamorphosis. At this point, their long gut shortens and begins favoring the diet of insects.

Rapid changes in the body can then be observed as the lifestyle of the frog changes completely. The spiral‐shaped mouth with horny tooth ridges is resorbed together with the spiral gut. The animal develops a big jaw, and its gills disappear along with its gill sac. Eyes and legs grow quickly, a tongue is formed, and all this is accompanied by associated changes in the neural networks (development of stereoscopic vision, loss of the lateral line system, etc.) All this can happen in about a day. It is not until a few days later that the tail is reabsorbed, due to the higher thyroxin concentrations required for tail resorption.

===== Salamanders =====
Salamander development is highly diverse; some species go through a dramatic reorganization when transitioning from aquatic larvae to terrestrial adults, while others, such as the axolotl, display pedomorphosis and never develop into terrestrial adults. Within the genus Ambystoma, species have evolved to be pedomorphic several times, and pedomorphosis and complete development can both occur in some species.

===== Newts =====
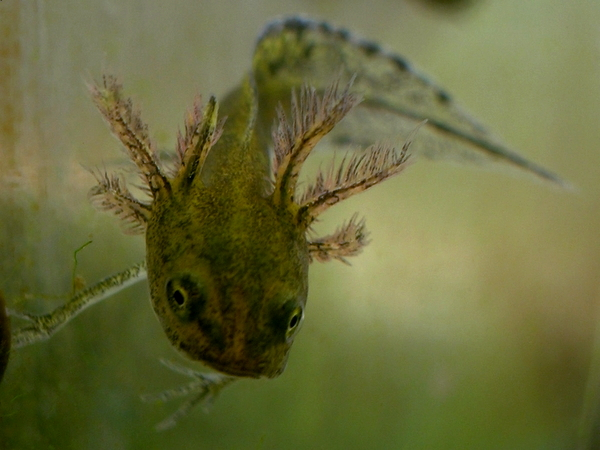
The large external gills of the crested newt

In newts, metamorphosis occurs due to the change in habitat, not a change in diet, because newt larvae already feed as predators and continue doing so as adults. Newts' gills are never covered by a gill sac and will be resorbed only just before the animal leaves the water. Adults can move faster on land than in water. Newts often have an aquatic phase in spring and summer, and a land phase in winter. For adaptation to a water phase, prolactin is the required hormone, and for adaptation to the land phase, thyroxin. External gills do not return in subsequent aquatic phases because these are completely absorbed upon leaving the water for the first time.

===== Caecilians =====
Basal caecilians such as Ichthyophis go through a metamorphosis in which aquatic larva transition into fossorial adults, which involves a loss of the lateral line. More recently diverged caecilians (the Teresomata) do not undergo an ontogenetic niche shift of this sort and are in general fossorial throughout their lives. Thus, most caecilians do not undergo an anuran-like metamorphosis.

== See also ==
- Developmental biology – Study of how organisms develop and grow
- Direct development – Growth to adulthood without metamorphosis
- Gosner stage – System of describing stages of development in anurans
- Hypermetamorphosis – High variability forms of complete metamorphosis
- Morphogenesis – Biological process that causes an organism to develop its shape
- Planidium – Form of insect larva

== Bibliography ==
- Davies, R.G. (1998). Outlines of Entomology. Chapman and Hall. Second Edition. Chapter 3.
- Williamson D.I. (2003). The Origins of Larvae. Kluwer.
