= Bothrideres cryptus =

Scientific classification
- Kingdom: Animalia
- Phylum: Arthropoda
- Class: Insecta
- Order: Coleoptera
- Suborder: Polyphaga
- Infraorder: Cucujiformia
- Family: Bothrideridae
- Genus: Bothrideres
- Species: B. cryptus

Binomial name
- Bothrideres cryptus Stephan, 1989

Species of beetle

Bothrideres cryptus is a species of dry bark beetle in the family Bothrideridae. It is found in North America. This beetle can be found under the dry bark of dead oaks, where it parasitizes cerambycid larvae of the genus Parelaphidion.
