= Bothrideres geminatus =

Scientific classification
- Kingdom: Animalia
- Phylum: Arthropoda
- Class: Insecta
- Order: Coleoptera
- Suborder: Polyphaga
- Infraorder: Cucujiformia
- Family: Bothrideridae
- Genus: Bothrideres
- Species: B. geminatus

Binomial name
- Bothrideres geminatus (Say, 1826)

Species of beetle

Bothrideres geminatus is a species of dry bark beetle in the family Bothrideridae. It is found in North America. Larvae occur under the dry bark of dead trees, where they parasitize the larvae of Chrysobothris beetles.
