= Pleuridium =

Pleuridium may refer to:

- Pleuridium Rabenh., a taxonomic synonym for a genus of mosses, Archidium
- Pleuridium (C.Presl) Fée, a taxonomic synonym for a genus of flowering plants, Campyloneurum
- Pleuridium LeConte, 1861, a taxonomic synonym for a genus of beetles, Sosylus
