= Planidium =

Form of insect larva

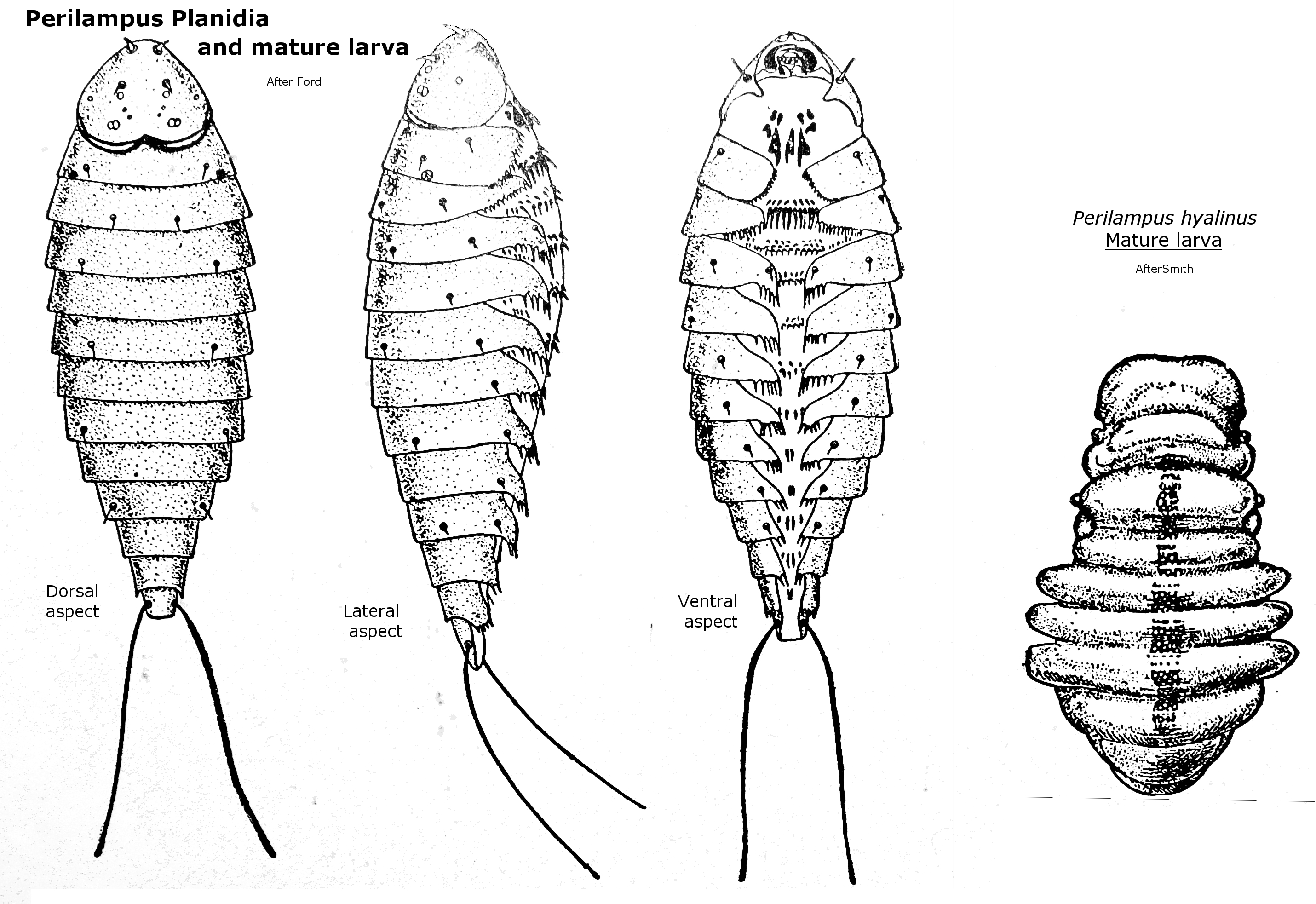
Planidia and larva of a parasitoid wasp of the Perilampidae family.

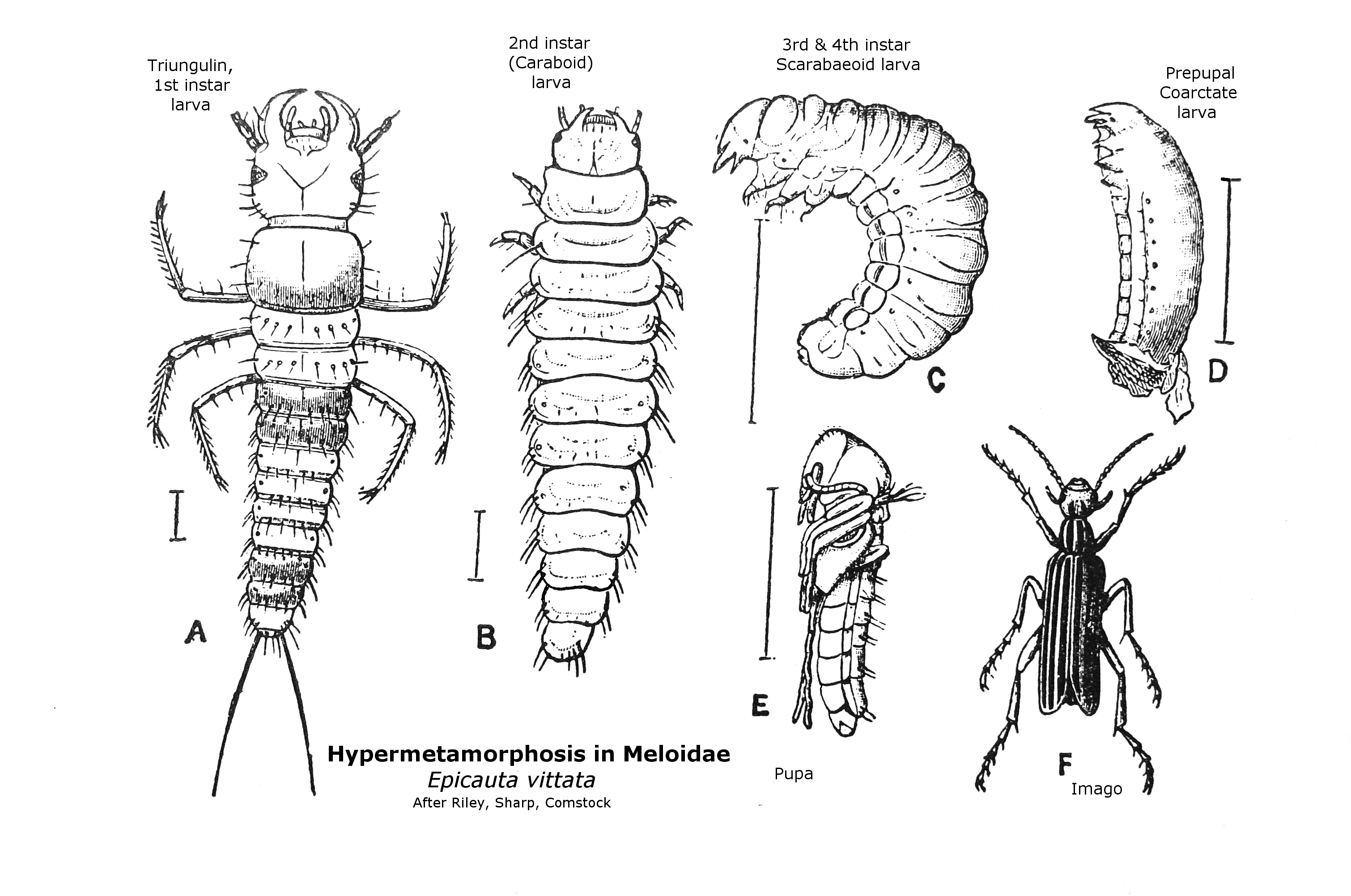
Triungulin, later larval, and other instars of a Meloid beetle.

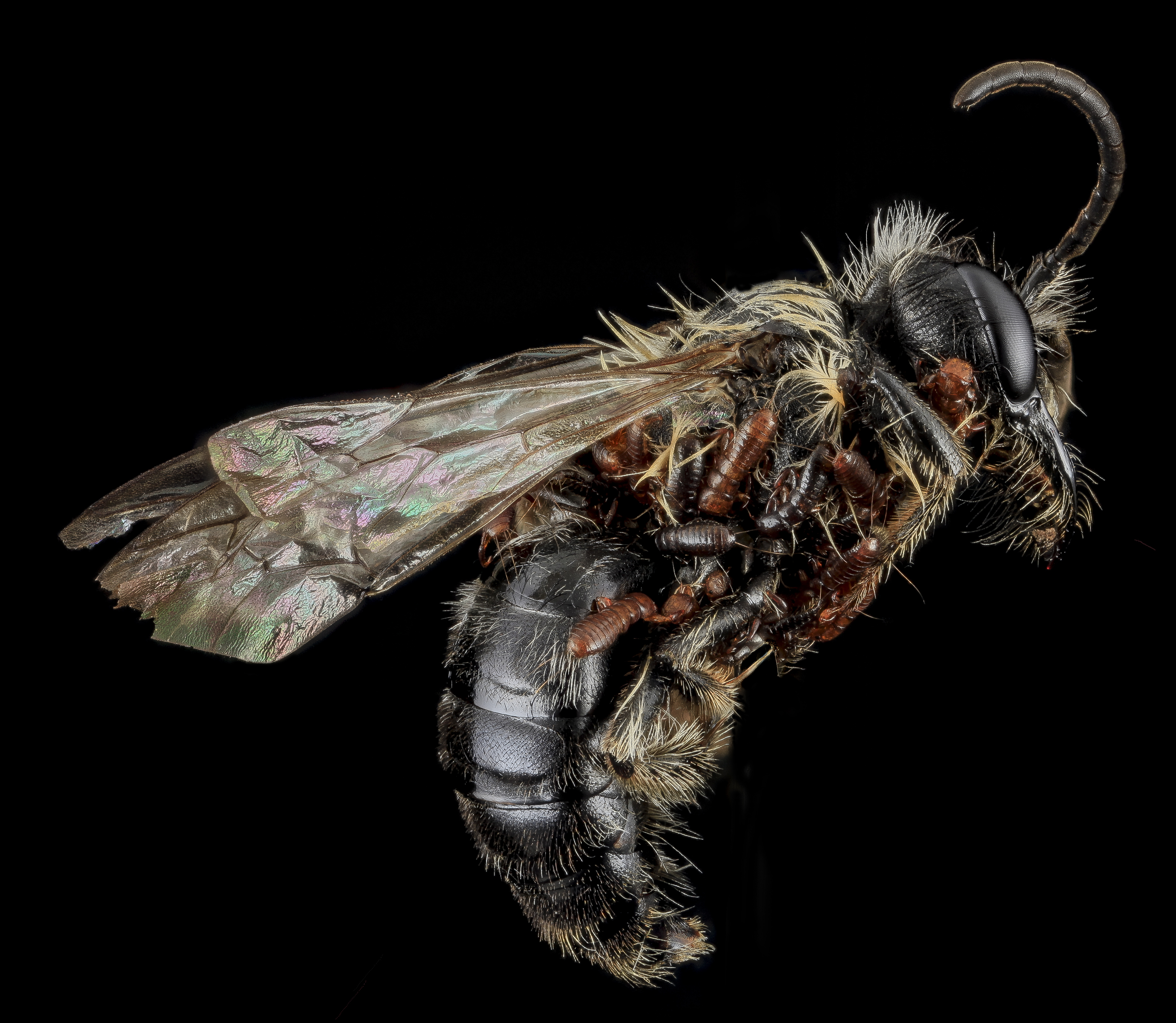
Planidia of a Meloid beetle in opportunistic phoresy on a male solitary bee (Andrena carlini), awaiting contact with a female, whose nest they then could invade.

A planidium is a specialized form of insect larva seen in the first-instar of a few families of insects that have parasitoidal ways of life. They are usually flattened, highly sclerotized (hardened), and quite mobile. The function of the planidial stage is to find a host on which the later larval instars may feed, generally until the insect pupates.

== Etymology ==
The term "planidium" is derived from the Greek language πλανής (planis) meaning "wanderer", the same origin of the word planet. The term planula was similarly derived in reference to the wandering larvae of certain Cnidaria. Accordingly, "planidium" is the general term for such an adaptation, and it is not limited to any particular species or morphology. Planidia of different species differ variously from each other in form.

The first-instar larva in the beetle family Meloidae has three claws on each foot, and is therefore called a triungulin (plural triungula). The term is derived from the Latin tri meaning "three", and ungula meaning "a claw". An obsolescent variant triungulus (plural triunguli) may still be encountered.

For practical purposes of uniform terminology, except where there is some special reason for the use of the more narrowly specific term "triungulin", it is best to use only the more general term "planidium".

== Function and occurrence ==
Planidia occur among subsets of the members of several orders, including: Neuroptera, Hymenoptera, Coleoptera, Strepsiptera, and Diptera. Examples include: the neuropteran family Mantispidae; the beetle families Meloidae and Ripiphoridae; and the fly families Acroceridae, Bombyliidae, Nemestrinidae, and Tachinidae. Among the Hymenoptera examples include the parasitic wasp families Eucharitidae and Perilampidae. All Strepsiptera have planidial larvae.

The term "triungulin", originally coined in reference to the planidia of the beetle family Meloidae, is commonly applied to similar-looking planidial larvae of other families of beetles or of Strepsiptera. It is purely descriptive, and of no theoretical importance; without implying any conceptual difference from other planidia.

== Planidial behaviour ==
Depending on their species, planidial larvae either wait for a passing host, or actively seek one out. In many species, the planidia depend on phoresy to gain access to the actual host life stage. For instance, they may ride on the adult form of the host, or on an intermediate vector that might carry them to where their later instars might feed till they are ready for pupation. Typically, such a planidium then enters the body of the host larva, but some of the species attack host eggs; for example, some Meloidae feed on the subterranean egg pods of grasshoppers and locusts, and Mantispidae feed on egg purses of spiders.

A striking example of phoresy is that planidia of beetles of the genus Meloe will form a group and produce a pheromone that mimics the sex attractant of its host bee species; when the male bee arrives and attempts to mate with the mass of larvae, they climb onto his abdomen, and from there, they transfer in turn to a female bee, and finally to the bee nest, where they attack the bee larvae as their hosts.

It is common for planidia to molt shortly after entering the host body or nest, but some species postpone further development while the host larva grows. Whether after a delay or not, the first ecdysis changes the planidial form into an extra larval form that is remarkably different from the planidium; this reflects the lapsed need for the larva to wander any further, together with an increased need for efficiency in feeding. The changes in morphology usually include de-sclerotization, and loss of the legs and eyes of the larvae. Inclusion of the extra, functionally distinct form of larva into the life history is an example of hypermetamorphosis.

== See also ==
- Developmental biology – Study of how organisms develop and grow
- Direct development – Growth to adulthood without metamorphosis
- Gosner stage – System of describing stages of development in anurans
- Hypermetamorphosis – High variability forms of complete metamorphosis
- Metamorphosis – Profound change in body structure during the postembryonic development of an organism
- Morphogenesis – Biological process that causes an organism to develop its shape
