= Lithophorus =

Scientific classification
- Kingdom: Animalia
- Phylum: Arthropoda
- Class: Insecta
- Order: Coleoptera
- Suborder: Polyphaga
- Infraorder: Cucujiformia
- Family: Bothrideridae
- Genus: Lithophorus; Sharp, 1894

Genus of beetles

Lithophorus is a genus of dry bark beetles in the family Bothrideridae. There is one described species in Lithophorus, L. ornatus.
