= Prolyctus =

Scientific classification
- Kingdom: Animalia
- Phylum: Arthropoda
- Class: Insecta
- Order: Coleoptera
- Suborder: Polyphaga
- Infraorder: Cucujiformia
- Family: Bothrideridae
- Genus: Prolyctus; Zimmermann, 1869

Genus of beetles

Prolyctus is a genus of dry bark beetles in the family Bothrideridae. There is one described species in Prolyctus, P. exaratus.
