= Direct development =

Growth to adulthood without metamorphosis

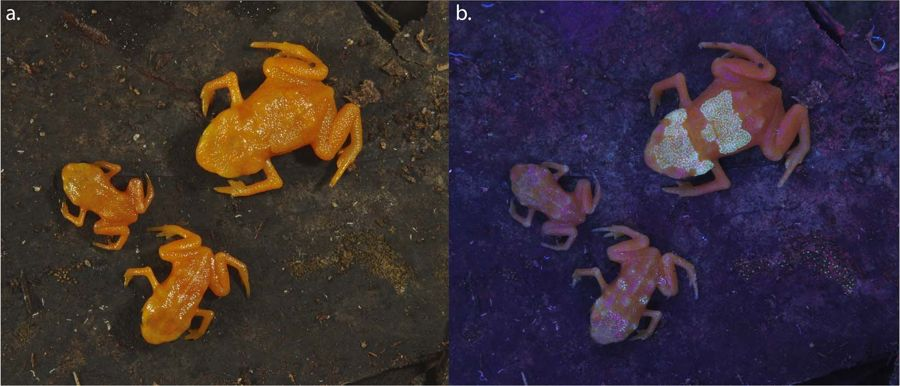
Direct development in the pumpkin toadlet Brachycephalus ephippium

Direct development is a concept in biology. It refers to forms of growth to adulthood that do not involve metamorphosis. An animal undergoes direct development if the immature organism resembles a small adult rather than having a distinct larval form. A frog that hatches out of its egg as a small frog undergoes direct development. A frog that hatches out of its egg as a tadpole does not.

Direct development is the opposite of complete metamorphosis. An animal undergoes complete metamorphosis if it becomes a non-moving thing, for example a pupa in a cocoon, between its larval and adult stages.

== Examples ==
Direct development is ancestral in tetrapodomorphs. It has been suggested that either metamorphosis emerged in the last common ancestor of modern amphibians and amniotes (crown Tetrapoda), but that the common ancestor of amniotes reverted back to direct development, or that metamorphosis convergently evolved both in temnospondyls and their modern amphibian descendants as well as seymouriamorphs.

- Amphibians have developed direct development multiple times (convergent evolution), which includes groups such as:
  - Brachycephaloidea
  - Brevicipitidae
  - Arthroleptis
- Some arthropods also undergo direct development, such as ametabolous taxa like springtails. Various crustacean groups independently developed direct development, such as:
  - Aeglidae
  - Crayfish
  - Freshwater and terrestrial crabs
