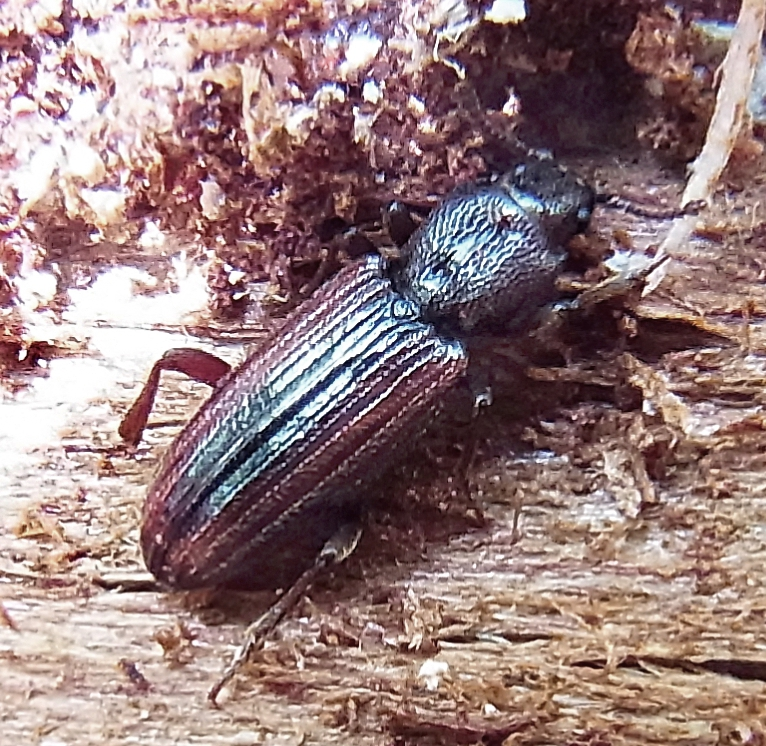
- Bothrideres bipunctatus

Scientific classification
- Kingdom: Animalia
- Phylum: Arthropoda
- Clade: Pancrustacea
- Class: Insecta
- Order: Coleoptera
- Suborder: Polyphaga
- Infraorder: Cucujiformia
- Family: Bothrideridae
- Genus: Bothrideres; Dejean, 1835

Species
- See text

= Bothrideres =

Genus of beetles

Bothrideres is a genus of dry bark beetles in the family Bothrideridae. There are about 13 described species in Bothrideres.

== Species ==
These 13 species belong to the genus Bothrideres:

- Bothrideres arizonicus Casey, 1924^{i c g}
- Bothrideres bipunctatus (Gmelin, 1790)^{g}
- Bothrideres cactophagi Schwarz, 1899^{i c g}
- Bothrideres chevrolati (Grouvelle, 1908)^{g}
- Bothrideres contractus (Geoffroy, 1785)^{g}
- Bothrideres cryptus Stephan, 1989^{i c g b}
- Bothrideres depressus Sharp, 1895^{i c g}
- Bothrideres dufaui (Grouvelle, 1908)^{g}
- Bothrideres geminatus (Say, 1826)^{i c g b}
- Bothrideres interstitialis Heyden, 1870^{g}
- Bothrideres montanus Horn, 1878^{i c g b}
- Bothrideres planus Chevrolat, 1864^{g}
- Bothrideres subvittatus Sharp, 1895^{i c g}

Data sources: i = ITIS, c = Catalogue of Life, g = GBIF, b = Bugguide.net
