= Sosylus =

Scientific classification
- Kingdom: Animalia
- Phylum: Arthropoda
- Class: Insecta
- Order: Coleoptera
- Suborder: Polyphaga
- Infraorder: Cucujiformia
- Family: Bothrideridae
- Genus: Sosylus; Erichson, 1845

Genus of beetles

Sosylus is a genus of dry bark beetles in the family Bothrideridae. There are about eight described species in Sosylus.

== Species ==
These eight species belong to the genus Sosylus:

- Sosylus castaneus Pascoe, 1863
- Sosylus chapini Hinton
- Sosylus costatus LeConte, 1863
- Sosylus dentiger Horn, 1878
- Sosylus extensus Casey, 1897
- Sosylus latisnus Hinton
- Sosylus nevermanni Hinton
- Sosylus striolatus (Grouvelle, 1914)
