= Hemimetabolism =

Type of insect development

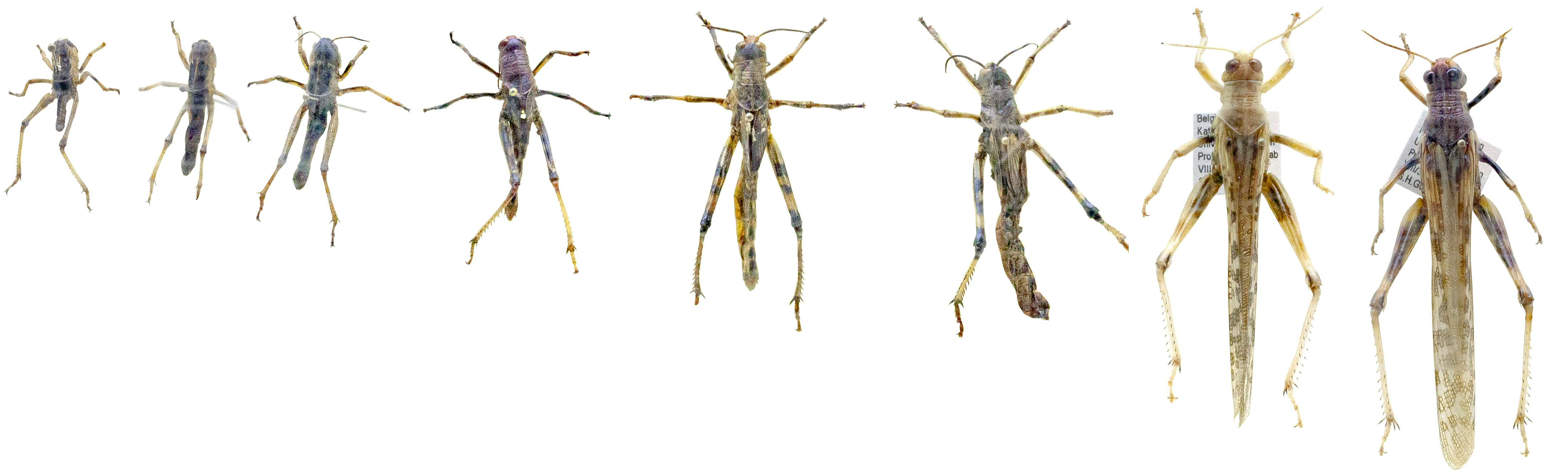
Eight locust instars illustrate the gradual change in hemimetabolous insects.

Hemimetabolism or hemimetaboly, also called partial metamorphosis and paurometabolism, is the mode of development of certain insects that includes three distinct stages: the egg, nymph, and the adult stage, or imago. These groups go through gradual changes; there is no pupal stage. The nymph often has a thin exoskeleton and resembles the adult stage but lacks wings and functional reproductive organs. The hemimetabolous insects differ from ametabolous taxa in that the one and only adult instar undergoes no further moulting.

== Orders ==
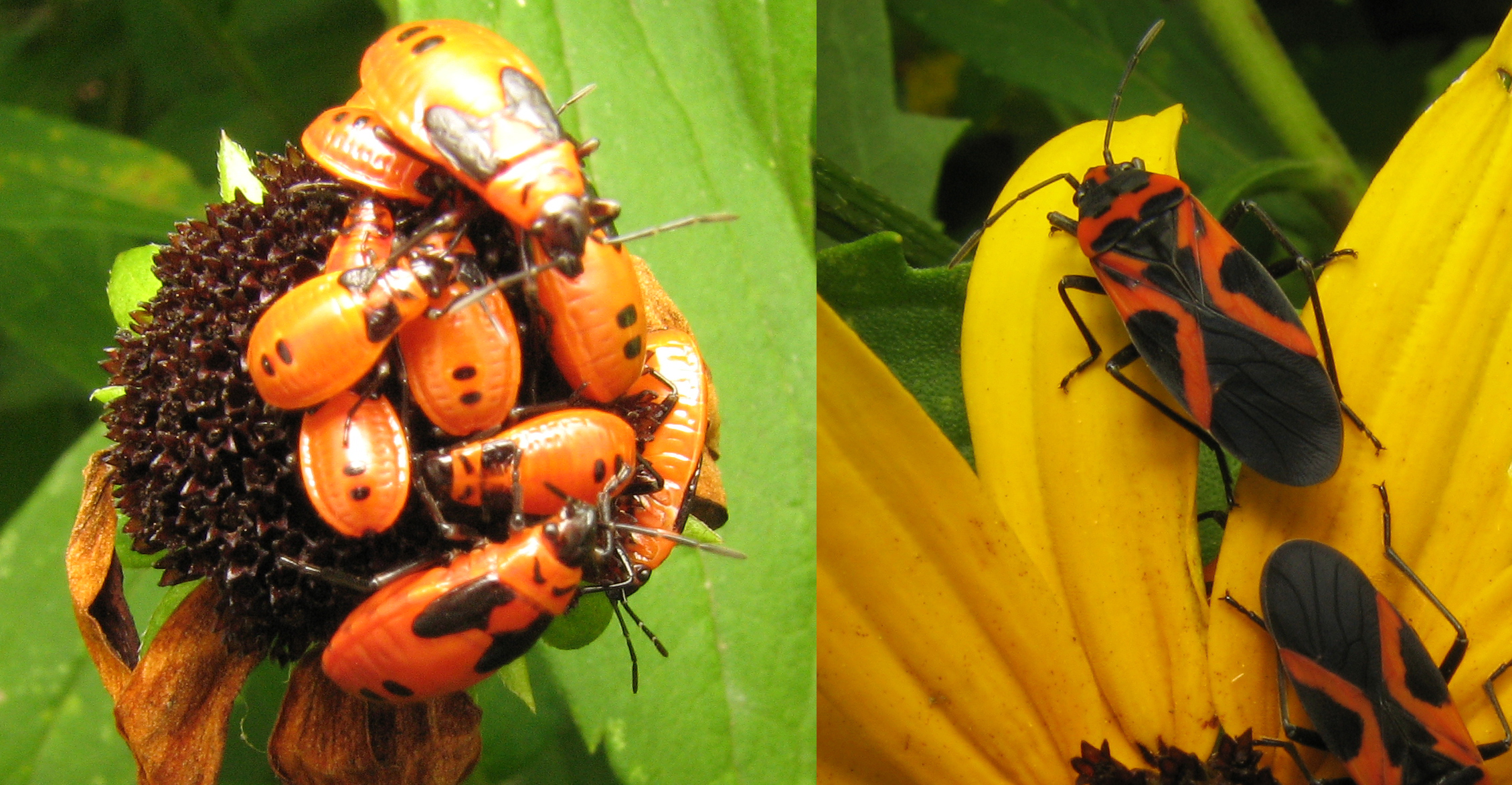
Nymphs and adults of Lygaeus turcicus, Hemiptera

All insects of the Pterygota except Holometabola belong to hemimetabolous orders:

- Hemiptera (scale insects, aphids, whitefly, cicadas, leafhoppers, and true bugs)
- Orthoptera (grasshoppers, locusts, and crickets)
- Mantodea (praying mantises)
- Blattodea (cockroaches and termites)
- Dermaptera (earwigs)
- Odonata (dragonflies and damselflies)
- Phasmatodea (stick insects)
- Phthiraptera (sucking lice)
- Ephemeroptera (mayflies)
- Plecoptera (stoneflies)
- Notoptera (icebugs and gladiators)

== Terminology of aquatic entomology ==
In aquatic entomology, different terminology is used when categorizing insects with gradual or partial metamorphosis. Paurometabolism (gradual) refers to insects whose nymphs occupy the same environment as the adults, as in the family Gerridae of Hemiptera. The hemimetabolous (partial) insects are those whose nymphs, called naiads, occupy aquatic habitats while the adults are terrestrial. This includes all members of the orders Plecoptera, Ephemeroptera, and Odonata. Aquatic entomologists use this categorization because it specifies whether the adult will occupy an aquatic or semi aquatic habitat, or will be terrestrial.

== See also ==
- Ametabolism
- Holometabolism
- Subimago
- Metamorphosis
