= Ametabolism =

Type of growth in insects

Ametabolism is a type of growth or life cycle in insects in which there is slight or no metamorphosis, only a gradual increase in size. It is present only in primitive wingless insects: the orders Archaeognatha and Zygentoma.

== See also ==
- Hemimetabolism
- Holometabolism
