= Holometabolism =

One kind of insect metamorphosis

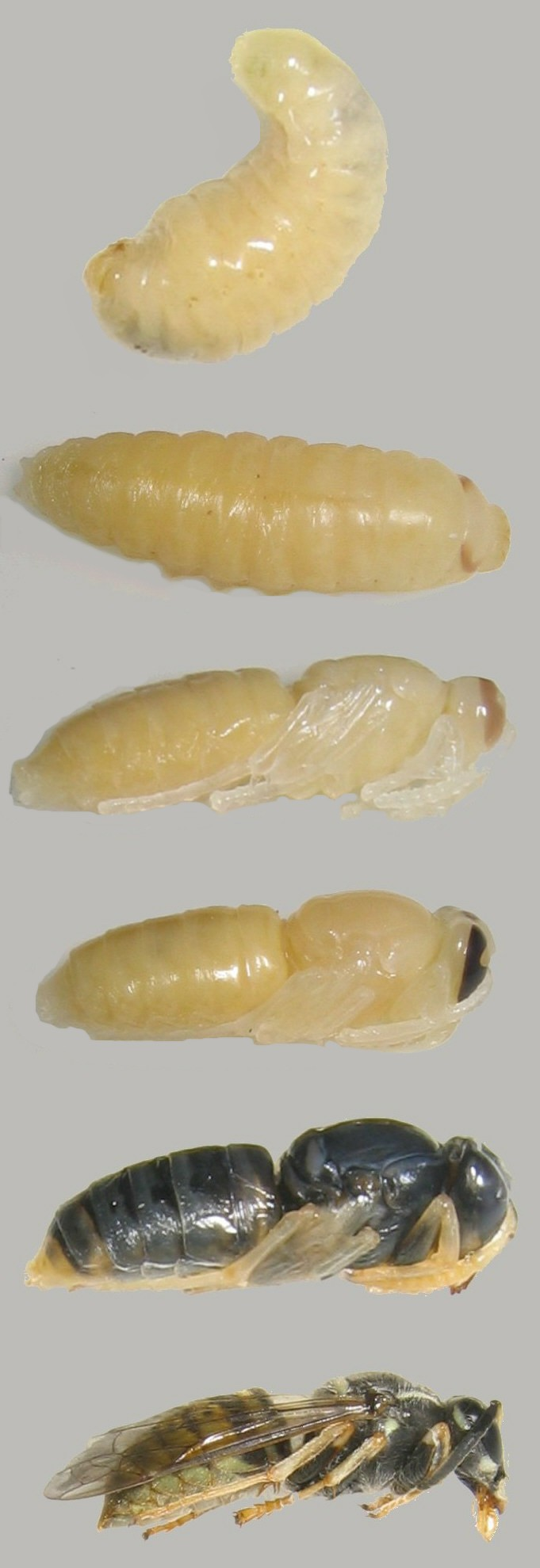
Lifestages of a holometabolous insect (wasp). Egg is not shown. Third, fourth, and fifth images depict different ages of pupae.

Holometabolism, also called complete metamorphosis, is a form of insect development which includes four life stages: egg, larva, pupa, and imago (or adult). Holometabolism is a synapomorphic trait of all insects in the clade Holometabola. Immature stages of holometabolous insects are very different from the mature stage. In some species, a holometabolous life cycle minimizes competition between larvae and adults by separating their ecological niches. The morphology and behavior of each stage are adapted for different activities. For example, larval traits maximize feeding, growth, and development, while adult traits enable dispersal, mating, and egg laying. Some species of holometabolous insects protect and feed their offspring. Other insect developmental strategies include ametabolism and hemimetabolism.

== Developmental stages ==
There are four general developmental stages, each with its own morphology and function.

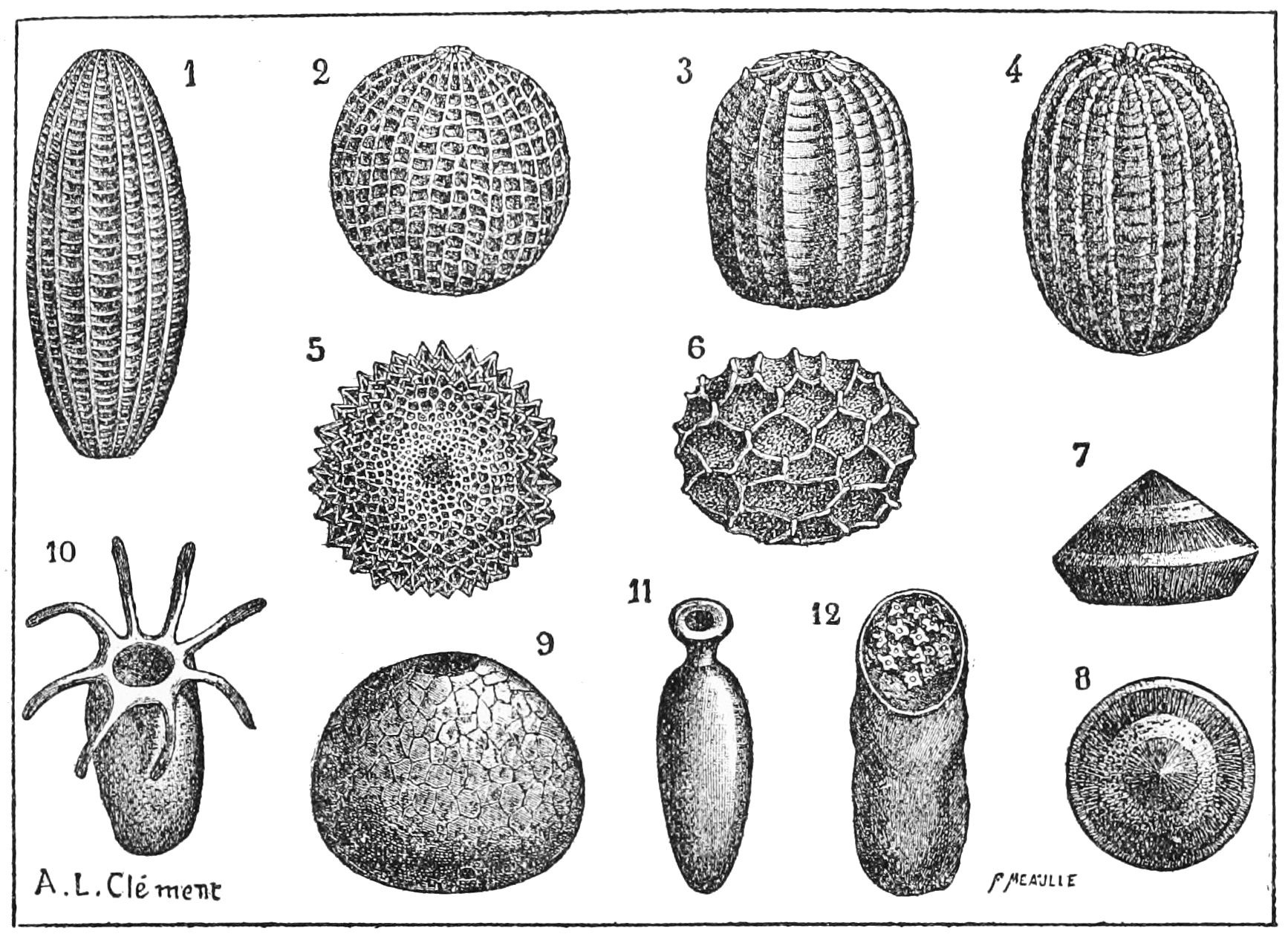
Various insect eggs.

=== Egg ===
The first stage of the insect life cycle is the egg, or embryo, for all developmental strategies. The egg begins as a single cell which divides and develops into the larval form before hatching. Some insects reproduce by parthenogenesis or may be haplodiploid, and produce viable eggs without fertilization. The egg stage in most insects is very short, only a few days. However, insects may hibernate, or undergo diapause in the egg stage to avoid extreme conditions, in which case this stage can last several months. The eggs of some types of insects, such as tsetse flies, or aphids (which are hemimetabolous), hatch before they are laid.

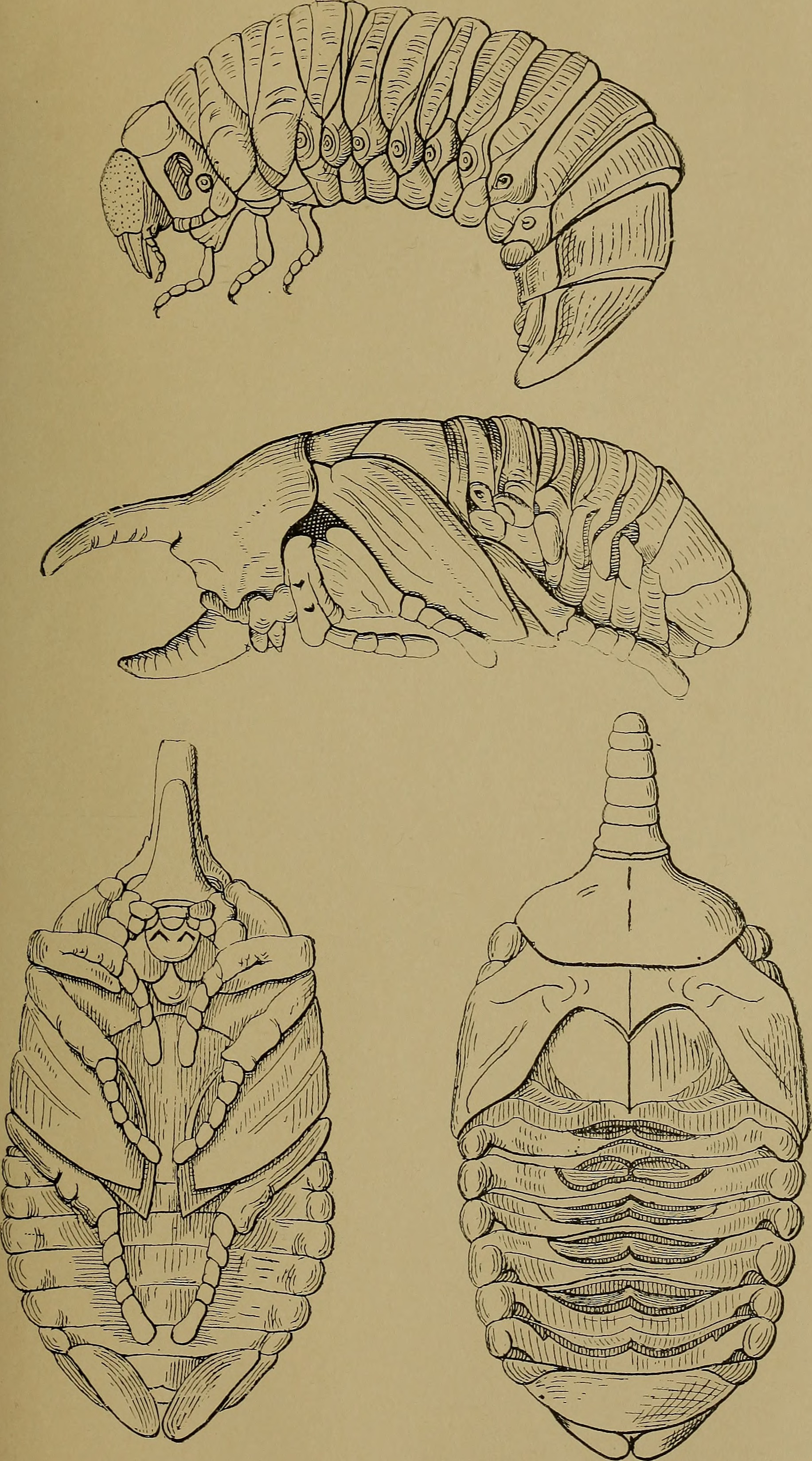
Scarabaeiform larva and exarate pupae of a rhinoceros beetle.

=== Larva ===
The second stage of the holometabolous life cycle is the larva (plural: larvae). Many adult insects lay their eggs directly onto a food source so the larvae may begin eating as soon as they hatch. Larvae never possess wings or wing buds, and have simple rather than compound eyes. In most species, the larval stage is mobile and worm-like in form. Larvae can be classified by their body type:

- Elateriform: wireworm-like, as in the beetle family Elateridae.
- Eruciform: caterpillar-like, as in the Lepidoptera and Symphyta. Some that lack legs, such as the larvae of Nematoceran flies such as mosquitoes, are called apodous eruciform.
- Scarabaeiform: grub-like, with a head-capsule, as in the beetle family Scarabaeidae.
- Vermiform: maggot-like, as in most species of Brachyceran flies.
- Campodeiform: similar to members of the genus Campodea, elongated, more or less straight, flattened, and active, with functional legs.

The larval stage is variously adapted to gaining and accumulating the materials and energy necessary for growth and metamorphosis. Most holometabolous insects pass through several larval stages, or instars, as they grow and develop. The larva must moult to pass from each larval stage. These stages may look very similar and differ mostly in size, or may differ in many characteristics including, behavior, color, hairs, and spines, and even number of legs. Differences between larval stages are especially pronounced in insects with hypermetamorphosis. It is not uncommon that larval tissue that is broken down during metamorphosis increase in size by cell enlargement, while cells and tissues that will turn into imago grows by an increase in numbers.

=== Prepupa ===
Some insects, including species of Coleoptera, Diptera and Hymenoptera, have a prepupa stage after the larva stage and before the pupa stage. This is similar in shape to the larva and can still move around, but it does not feed.

The flies of superfamily Hippoboscoidea are unusual in that a larva develops inside its mother and is born in the prepupa stage, whereupon it immediately progresses to the pupa stage. If looking at only the time spent outside the mother, then the first stage of the life cycle in Hippoboscoidea would be the prepupa.

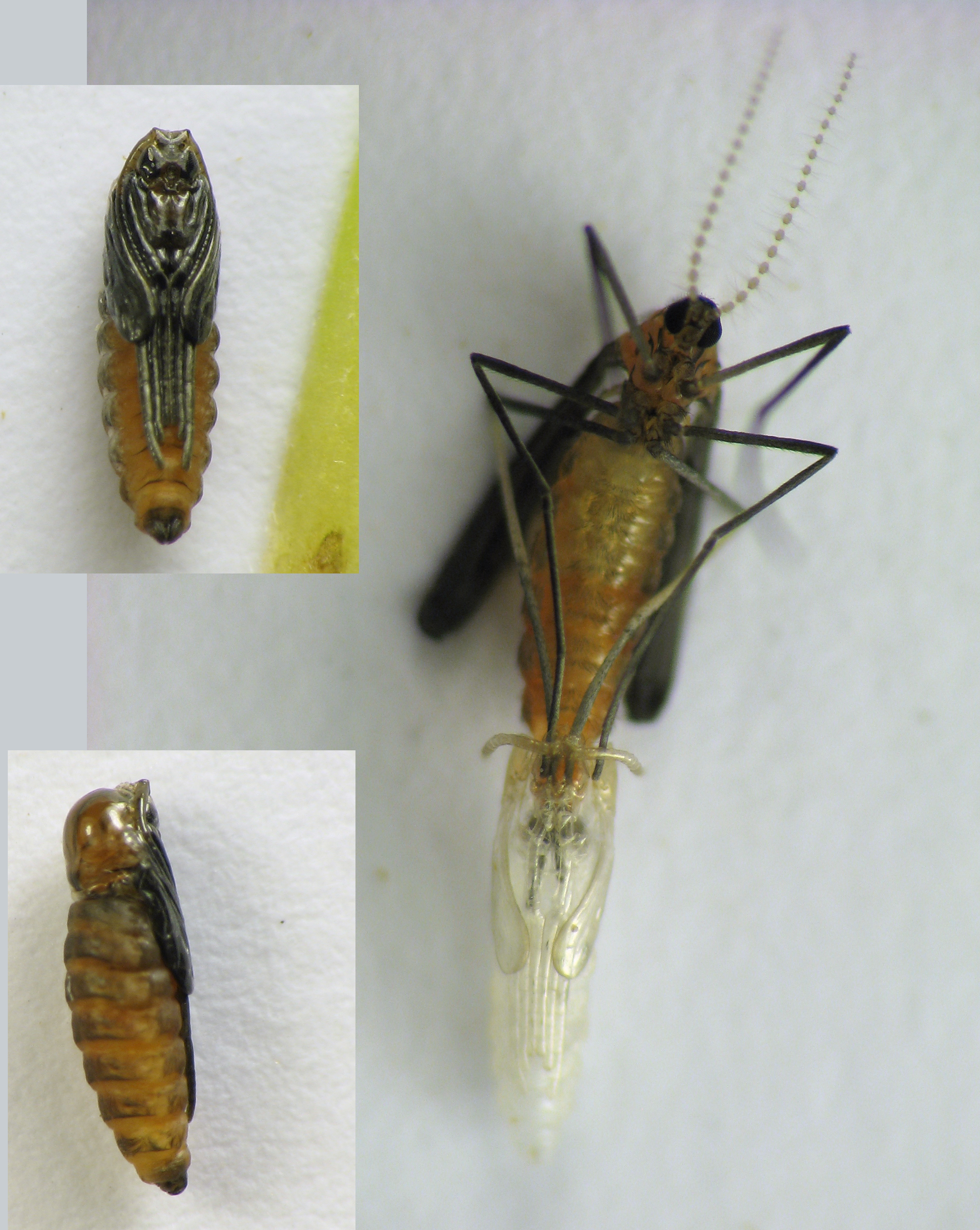
Rhopalomyia solidaginis, pupa and emerging adult.

=== Pupa ===
To enter the third stage of holometabolous development, the larva undergoes metamorphosis into a pupa. The pupa is a quiescent, non-feeding developmental stage. Most pupae move very little, although the pupae of some species, such as mosquitoes, are mobile. In preparation for pupation, the larvae of many species seek protected sites or construct a protective cocoon of silk or other material, such as its own accumulated feces. Some insects undergo diapause as pupa. In this stage, the insect's physiology and functional structure, both internal and external, change drastically.

Pupae can be classified into three types: obtect, exarate, and coarctate. Obtect pupae are compact, with the legs and other appendages enclosed, such as a butterfly chrysalis. Exarate pupae have their legs and other appendages free and extended. Coarctate pupae develop inside the larval skin.

=== Imago ===
The final stage of holometabolous insect development is the adult, or imago. Most adult insects have wings (excepting where secondarily lost) and functioning reproductive organs. Most adult insects grow very little after eclosion from the pupa. Some adult insects do not feed at all, and focus entirely on mating and reproduction. Some adult insects are postmitotic at adult emergence, with dividing cells restricted to specific organs. Cyrtodiopsis dalmanni is one such species, that does feed in the adult stage but does not grow in size. Nutrition is utilized in adults for growth of the internal reproductive structures.

== Evolutionary context of holometabolan development ==
Around 45% to 60% of all known living species are holometabolan insects. Juveniles and adult forms of holometabolan insects often occupy different ecological niches, exploiting different resources. This fact is considered a key driver in the unusual evolutionary diversification of form and physiology within this group.

According to the latest phylogenetic reconstructions, holometabolan insects are monophyletic, which suggests that the evolutionary innovation of complete metamorphosis occurred only once. Paleontological evidence shows that the first winged insects appeared in the Paleozoic. Carboniferous fossil samples (approximately 350 Ma) already display a remarkable diversity of species with functional wings. These fossil remains show that the primitive Apterygota, and the ancient winged insects were ametabolous (completely lacking metamorphosis). By the end of the Carboniferous, and into the Permian (approximately 300 Ma), most pterygotes had post-embryonic development which included separated nymphal and adult stages, which shows that hemimetaboly had already evolved. The earliest known fossil insects that can be considered holometabolan appear in Pangea in the Permian strata (approximately 280 Ma). Phylogenetic studies also show that the sister group of Holometabola is Paraneoptera, which includes hemimetabolan species and a number of neometabolan groups. The most parsimonious evolutionary hypothesis is that holometabolans originated from hemimetabolan ancestors.

== Theories on the origin of holometabolan metamorphosis ==
The origin of complete metamorphosis in insects has been the subject of a long lasting and, at times, fierce debate. One of the first theories proposed was one by William Harvey in 1651. Harvey suggested that the nutrients contained within the insect egg are so scarce that there was selection for the embryo to be forced to hatch before the completion of development. During the post-hatch larval life, the "desembryonized" animal would accumulate resources from the external environment and reach the pupal stage, which Harvey viewed as the perfect egg form. However, Jan Swammerdam conducted a dissection study and showed that pupal forms are not egg-like, but instead more of a transitional stage between larvae and adult.

In 1883, John Lubbock revitalized Harvey's hypothesis and argued that the origin and evolution of holometabolan development can be explained by the precocious eclosion of the embryo. Hemimetabolan species, whose larvae look like the adult, have an embryo that completes all developmental stages (namely: "protopod", "polipod", and "oligopod" stages) inside the eggshell. Holometabolan species instead have vermiform larvae and a pupal stage after incomplete development and hatching. The debate continued through the twentieth century, with some authors (like Charles Pérez in 1902) claiming the precocious eclosion theory outlandish, Antonio Berlese reestablishing it as the leading theory in 1913, and Augustus Daniel Imms disseminating it widely among Anglo-Saxon readers from 1925 (see Wigglesworth 1954 for review). One of the most contentious aspects of the precocious eclosion theory that fueled further debate in the field of evolution and development was the proposal that the hemimetabolan nymphal stages are equivalent to the holometabolan pupal stage. Critics of this theory (most notably H. E. Hinton) argue that post-embryonic development in hemimetabolans and holometabolans are equivalent, and rather the last nymphal instar stage of hemimetabolans would be homologous to the holometabolan pupae. More modern opinions still oscillate between these two conceptions of the hemi- to holometabolan evolutionary trend.

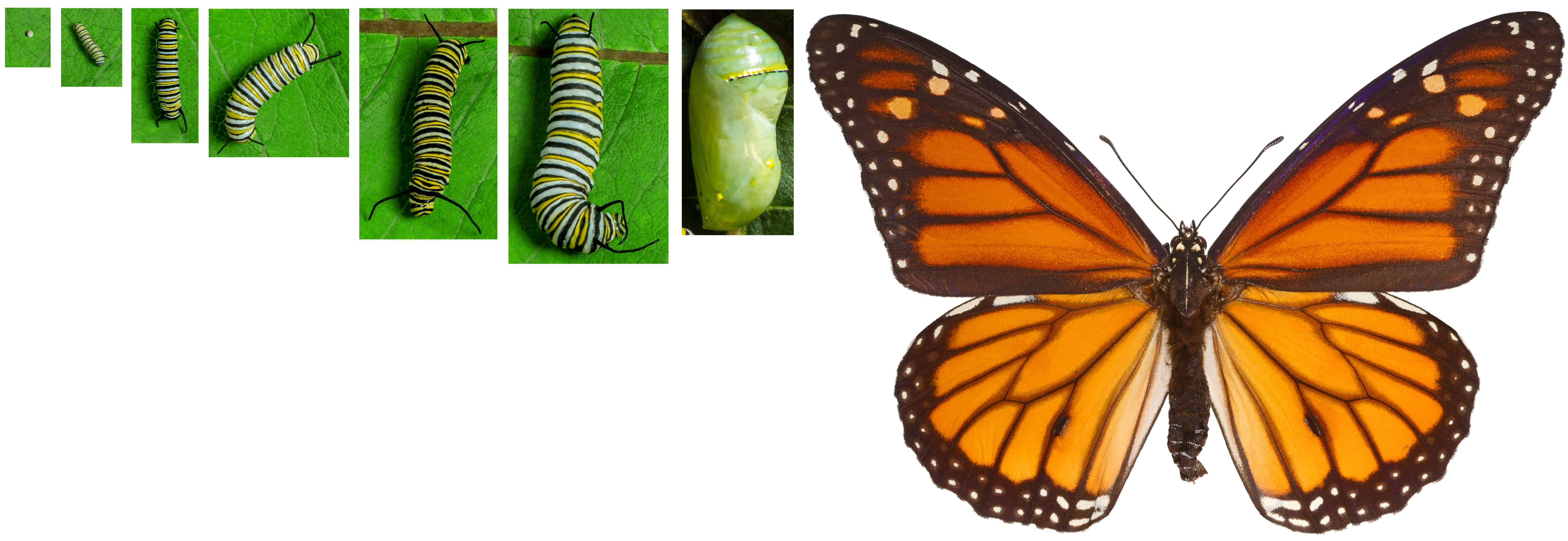
Life-cycle of butterfly, undergoing holometabolous metamorphosis from egg through caterpillar larvae to pupa and adult

J.W. Truman and L.M. Riddiford, in 1999, revitalized the precocious eclosion theory with a focus on endocrine control of metamorphosis. They postulated that hemimetabolan species hatch after three embryonic "moults" into a nymphal form similar to the adult, whereas holometabolan species hatch after only two embryonic 'moults' into vermiform larvae that are very different from the adult. In 2005, however, B. Konopová and J. Zrzavý reported ultrastructural studies across a wide range of hemimetabolan and holometabolan species and showed that the embryo of all species in both groups produce three cuticular depositions. The only exception was the Diptera Cyclorrhapha (unranked taxon of "high" Dipterans, within the infraorder Muscomorpha, which includes the highly studied Drosophila melanogaster) which has two embryonic cuticles, most likely due to secondary loss of the third. Critics of the precocious eclosion theory also argue that the larval forms of holometabolans are very often more specialized than those of hemimetabolans. X. Belles illustrates that the maggot of a fruitfly "cannot be envisaged as a vermiform and apodous (legless) creature that hatched in an early embryonic stage." It is in fact extremely specialized: for example, the cardiostipes and dististipes of the mouth are fused, as in some mosquitoes, and these parts are also fused to the mandibles and thus form the typical mouth hooks of fly larvae. Maggots are also secondarily, and not primitively, apodous. They are more derived and specialized than the cockroach nymph, a comparable and characteristic hemimetabolan example.

More recently, an increased focus on the hormonal control of insect metamorphosis has helped resolve some of the evolutionary links between hemi- and holometabolan groups. In particular, the orchestration of the juvenile hormone (JH) and ecdysteroids in molting and metamorphosis processes has received much attention. The molecular pathway for metamorphosis is now well described: periodic pulses of ecdysteroids induce molting to another immature instar (nymphal in hemimetabolan and larval in holometabolan species) in the presence of JH, but the programmed cessation of JH synthesis in instars of a threshold size leads to ecdysteroid secretion inducing metamorphosis. Experimental studies show that, with the exception of higher Diptera, treatment of the final instar stage with JH causes an additional immature molt and repetition of that stage. The increased understanding of the hormonal pathway involved in metamorphosis enabled direct comparison between hemimetabolan and holometabolan development. Most notably, the transcription factor Krüppel homolog 1 (Kr-h1) which is another important antimetamorphic transducer of the JH pathway (initially demonstrated in D. melanogaster and in the beetle Tribolium castaneum) has been used to compare hemimetabolan and holometabolan metamorphosis. Namely, the Kr-h1 discovered in the cockroach Blattella germanica (a representative hemimatabolan species), "BgKr-h1", was shown to be extremely similar to orthologues in other insects from holometabolan orders. Compared to many other sequences, the level of conservation is high, even between B. germanica and D. melanogaster, a highly derived holometabolan species. The conservation is especially high in the C2H2 Zn finger domain of the homologous transducer, which is the most complex binding site. This high degree of conservation of the C2H2 Zn finger domain in all studied species suggests that the Kr-h1 transducer function, an important part of the metamorphic process, might have been generally conserved across the entire class Insecta.

In 2009, a retired British planktologist, Donald I. Williamson, published a controversial paper in the journal Proceedings of the National Academy of Sciences (via Academy member Lynn Margulis through a unique submission route in PNAS that allowed members to peer review manuscripts submitted by colleagues), wherein Williamson claimed that the caterpillar larval form originated from velvet worms through hybridogenesis with other organisms, giving rising to holometabolan species. This paper was met with severe criticism, and spurred a heated debate in the literature.

== Orders ==
The holometabolous insect orders are:

- Coleoptera – Beetles
- Diptera – Flies
- Hymenoptera – Ants, bees, sawflies, and wasps
- Lepidoptera – Butterflies and moths
- Mecoptera – Scorpionflies
- Megaloptera – Alderflies, dobsonflies, and fishflies
- Miomoptera (extinct)
- Neuroptera – Lacewings, antlions, etc.
- Protodiptera (extinct)
- Raphidioptera – Snakeflies
- Siphonaptera – Fleas
- Strepsiptera – Twisted-winged parasites
- Trichoptera – Caddisflies

== See also ==
- Ametabolism
- Hemimetabolism
- Hypermetamorphosis
- Metamorphosis
