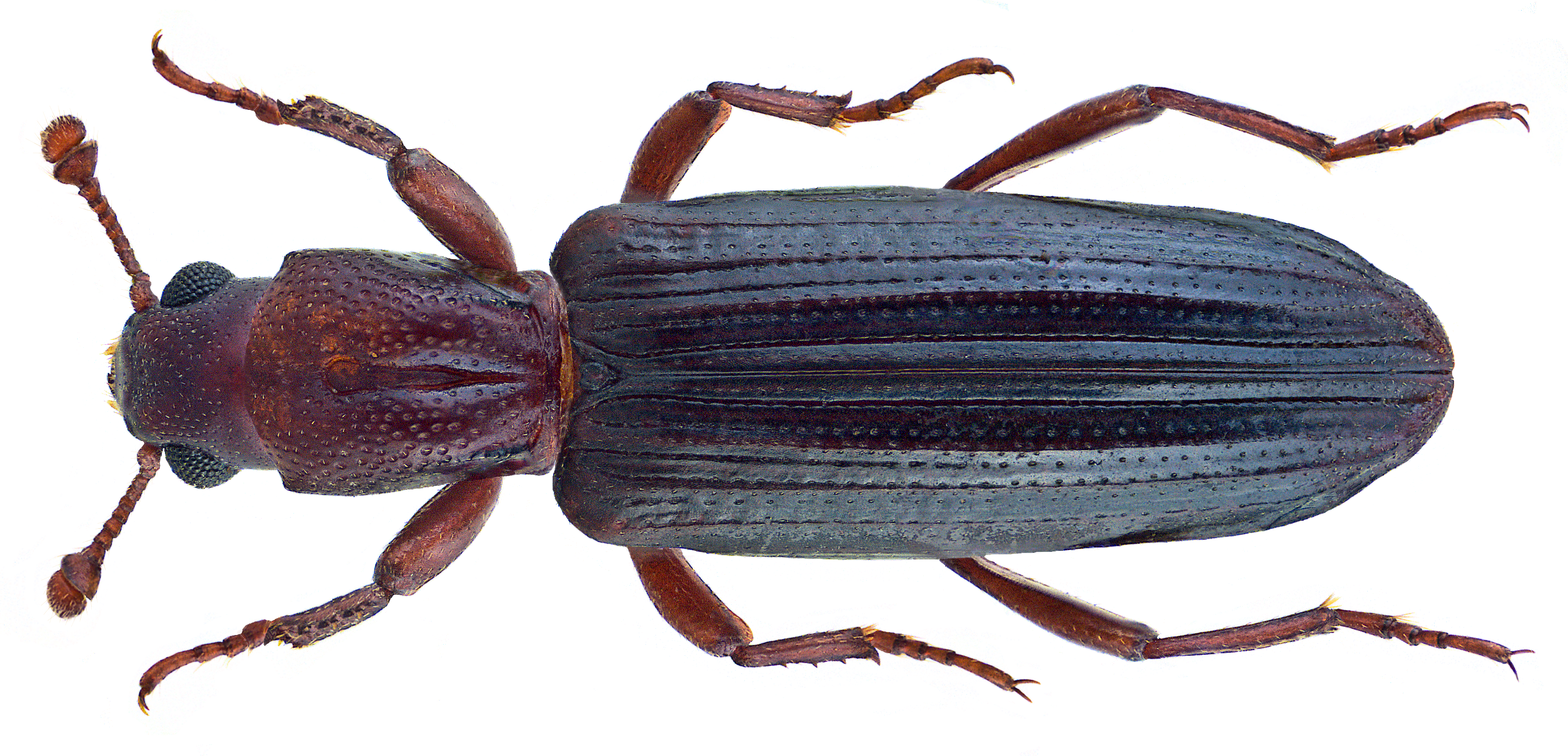
- Ogmoderes angusticollis

Scientific classification
- Kingdom: Animalia
- Phylum: Arthropoda
- Class: Insecta
- Order: Coleoptera
- Suborder: Polyphaga
- Infraorder: Cucujiformia
- Superfamily: Coccinelloidea
- Family: Bothrideridae; Erichson, 1845

Synonyms
- Anommatidae

= Bothrideridae =

Bothrideridae Temporal range: Cenomanian–Recent

Family of beetles

Bothrideridae is a family of beetles in the superfamily Coccinelloidea. They are known commonly as the cocoon-forming beetles or dry bark beetles. They occur worldwide with most native to the Old World tropics. In older literature, the family was often included in the family Colydiidae (e.g.,), but is now considered unrelated.

== Description ==
These beetles are 1.4 to 12 millimeters long as adults. They generally have very elongated bodies, some over 4 times longer than wide. They may be cylindrical or somewhat flattened. They are yellow to black in color, some with various patterning and some with red spots. They are hairless to slightly hairy or scaly in texture. The antennae have 9 to 11 segments and are usually club-shaped at the tips. Larvae are up to 18 millimeters long and are elongate in shape.

== Biology and ecology ==
Most beetles in this family live under tree bark. The larvae are ectoparasitoids of other insects, including other woodboring beetles, wood wasps, and carpenter bees.

== Taxonomy ==
Genera that were assigned to the former subfamilies Teredinae, Xylariophilinae, and Anommatinae are now placed into the separate family Teredidae, with members of the former subfamily Bothriderinae constituting the only remaining members of the family. Genera placed in the family in the new circumscription include:

- Antibothrus Sharp
- Acetoderes Pope
- Asosylus Grouvelle
- Bothrideres Dejean
- Chinikus Pope
- Cosmothroax Kraatz
- Craspedophilus Heinze
- Cylindromicrus Sharp
- Dastarcus Walker
- Deretaphrus Newman
- Emmaglaeus Fairmaire
- Erotylathris Motschulsk
- Leptoglyphus Sharp
- Lithophorus Sharp
- Mabomus Pope
- Ogmoderes Ganglbauer
- Patroderes Ślipiński
- Petalophora Westwood
- Prolyctus Zimmermann
- Machlotes Horn
- Pseudantibothrus Pope
- Pseudobothrideres Grouvelle
- Pseudososylus Grouvelle
- Roplyctus Pope
- Shekarus Pope
- Sosylus Erichson
- Triboderus Grouvelle.
- †Alveoderes Burmese amber, Myanmar, mid-Cretaceous (early Cenomanian)
