= Oxylaemus californicus =

Scientific classification
- Kingdom: Animalia
- Phylum: Arthropoda
- Class: Insecta
- Order: Coleoptera
- Suborder: Polyphaga
- Infraorder: Cucujiformia
- Family: Teredidae
- Genus: Oxylaemus
- Species: O. californicus

Binomial name
- Oxylaemus californicus Crotch, 1874

Species of beetle

Oxylaemus californicus is a species of beetle in the family Teredidae. It is found in North America.
