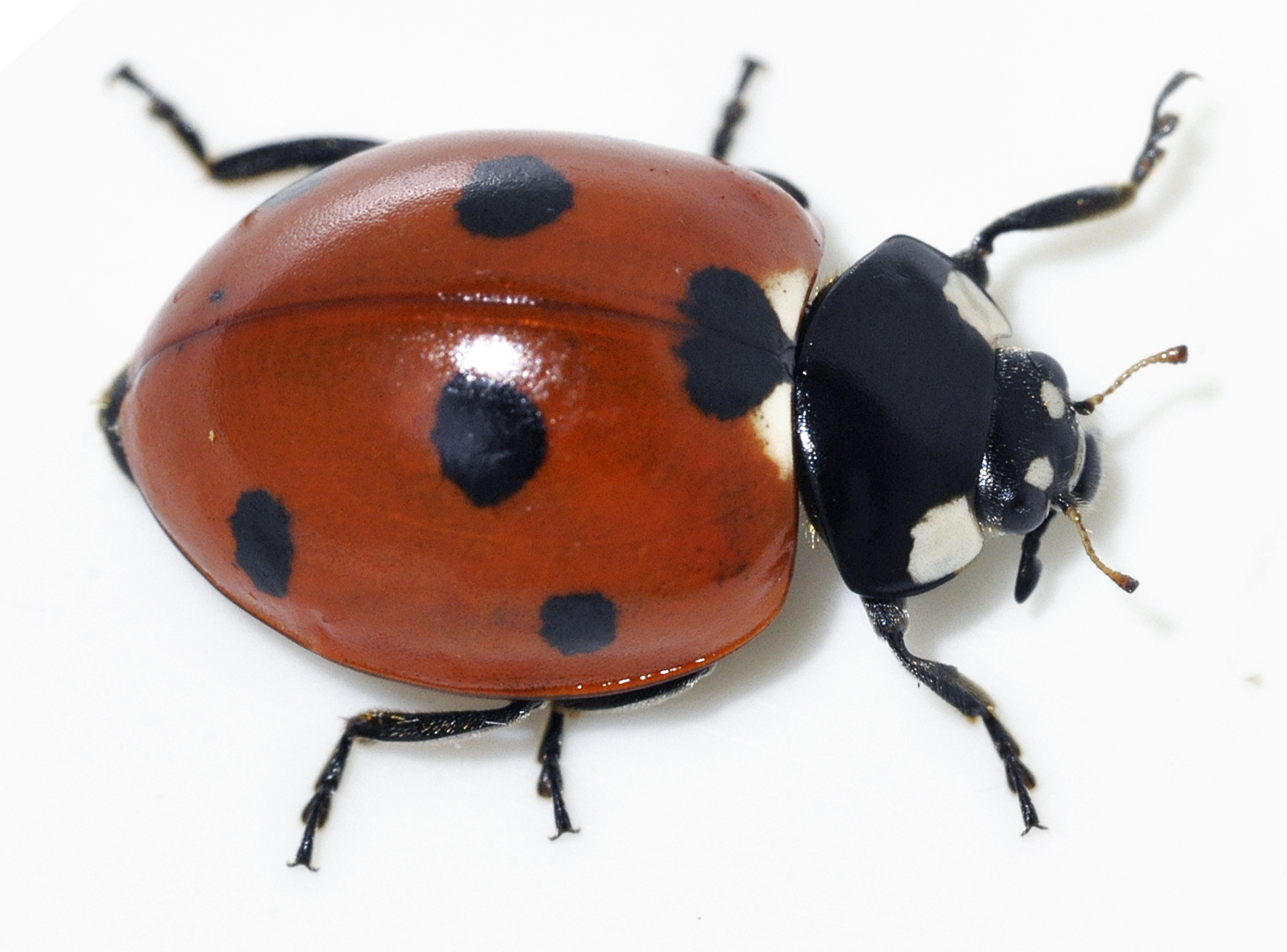
- Coccinella septempunctata

Scientific classification
- Kingdom: Animalia
- Phylum: Arthropoda
- Clade: Pancrustacea
- Class: Insecta
- Order: Coleoptera
- Suborder: Polyphaga
- Infraorder: Cucujiformia
- Superfamily: Coccinelloidea
- Family: Coccinellidae; Latreille, 1807

Subfamilies
- (traditional, but see below): Chilocorinae Mulsant, 1846; Coccidulinae Mulsant, 1846; Coccinellinae Latreille, 1807; Epilachninae Mulsant, 1846; Microweiseinae Leng, 1920; Scymninae Mulsant, 1846; Sticholotidinae Weise, 1901

Synonyms
- Cerasommatidiidae; Epilachnidae

= Coccinellidae =

Ladybird, ladybug, lady beetle Temporal range: Eocene—Present

Family of beetles

Coccinellidae (/ˌkɒksɪˈnɛlɪdiː/) is a widespread family of small beetles. They are commonly known as ladybugs in North America and ladybirds in Britain, Australia, New Zealand, and other English speaking territories; "lady" refers to Mary, the mother of Jesus. Entomologists use the names ladybird beetles or lady beetles to avoid confusion with true bugs. The more than 6,000 described species have a global distribution and are found in a variety of habitats. They are oval beetles with a domed back and flat underside. Many of the species have conspicuous aposematic (warning) colours and patterns, such as red with black spots, that warn potential predators that they taste bad.

Most coccinellid species are carnivorous predators, preying on insects such as aphids and scale insects. Other species are known to consume non-animal matter, including plants and fungi. They are promiscuous breeders, reproducing in spring and summer in temperate regions and during the wet season in tropical regions. Many predatory species lay their eggs near colonies of prey, providing their larvae with a food source. Like most insects, they develop from larva to pupa to adult. Temperate species hibernate and diapause during the winter; tropical species are dormant during the dry season. Coccinellids migrate between dormancy and breeding sites.

Species that prey on agricultural pests are considered beneficial insects. Several species have been introduced outside their range as biological control agents, with varying degrees of success. Some species are pests themselves and attack agricultural crops, or can infest people's homes, particularly in winter. Invasive species like Harmonia axyridis can pose an ecological threat to native coccinellid species. Other threats to coccinellids include climate change and habitat destruction. These insects have played roles in folklore, religion and poetry, and are particularly popular in nursery rhymes.

== Etymology ==
The name Coccinellidae, created by Pierre André Latreille in 1807, is derived from the Latin word coccineus meaning 'scarlet'. The common English name ladybird originated in Britain where the insects became known as "Our Lady's birds", subsequently spreading to the English speaking world. Mary ("Our Lady") was often depicted wearing a red cloak in early art, and the seven spots of the species Coccinella septempunctata (the most common in Europe) were said to represent her seven joys and seven sorrows. In the United States, the name was popularly adapted to ladybug. Entomologists prefer the names ladybird beetles or lady beetles to avoid confusion with true bugs. Names in some other countries may be similar; for example, in Germany they are known as Marienkäfer meaning 'Marybeetle' or 'ladybeetle'.

== Description ==
Coccinellids range in size from 0.8 to 18 mm (0.03–0.7 in). Adult females tend to be slightly larger than males. They are generally oval with domed backs and flattened undersides. They have large compound eyes and clubbed antennae with seven to eleven segments. The powerful mandibles (equivalent to jaws) typically have pairs of "teeth" which face each other. The coccinellid prothorax (front segment of thorax) is broad and convex, and can cover the back of the head. Being beetles, they have hardened, non-overlapping forewings, known as elytra, which cover up the more fragile hindwings when the insects are not in flight. Their legs are relatively short, with a tarsal formula of 4-4-4 (may appear 3-3-3 because the third segment of each tarsus is reduced). The tarsus (end of leg) has two claws at the tip.

As adults, these beetles differ from their closest relatives with the following morphological characteristics:

- Five pairs of spiracles (holes) on the abdomen
- A tentorium (internal supports inside the head) with separated branches at the front and no bridge
- No line dividing the frons and clypeus (upper and lower halves of the 'face')
- Maxillary palps with non-needle-shaped tips,
- Divided galea and lacinia (lobes at the end of the mouthparts)
- Smaller molar (flattened) area of the mandible
- Coxal cavities (holes where the leg articulates with the thorax) that open from the back in the front of the thorax and from the front in the middle of the thorax
- Epimeron (corner plates) on the metathorax (posterior segment of the thorax) with parallel edges
- Lines on the second abdominal sternum
- Tube-shaped, siphon-like genitalia in the male

Coccinellids are often distinctively coloured and patterned. The elytron may be light with dark spots or dark with light spots. Light areas are typically yellow, red, orange or brown, and the spots vary in size and shape and numbers. Some species have striped or checkered patterns. The pigment carotene creates the lighter colours, and melanins create darker colours. Other parts of the body also vary in colouration. These colour patterns typically serve as warning colouration, but some can act as camouflage, attract mates or even regulate heat. Several individual species may display polymorphism and even change colour between seasons.

Coccinellid larvae are elongated with square heads. They are covered in hairs or setae, the abdominal segments, in particular, each having six divided into pairs, and one to three segmented antennae. Their colouration varies from grey, blue-grey, grey-brown or brown and spotted with white, yellow, red or orange. They tend to brighten as they get closer to adulthood.

Appearance of different species

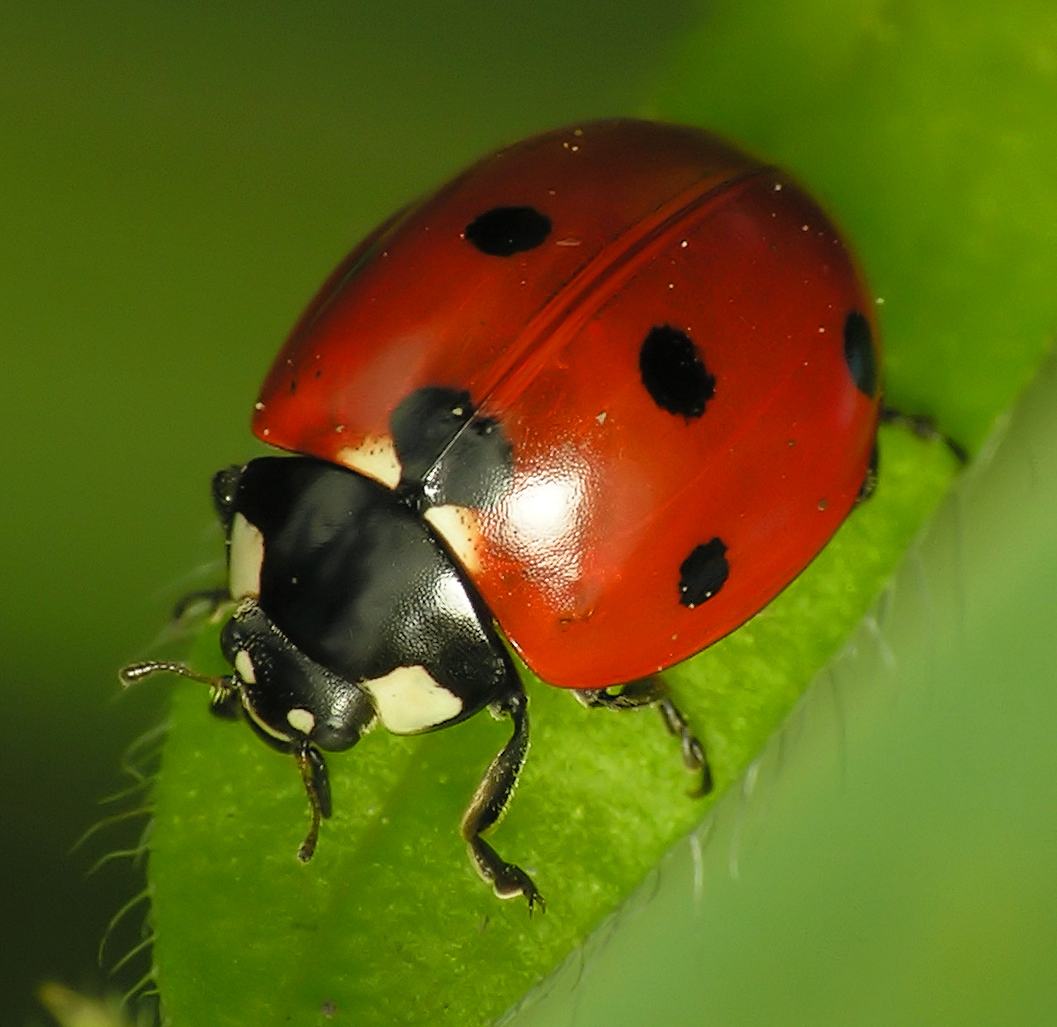
Coccinella septempunctata, black spots on red

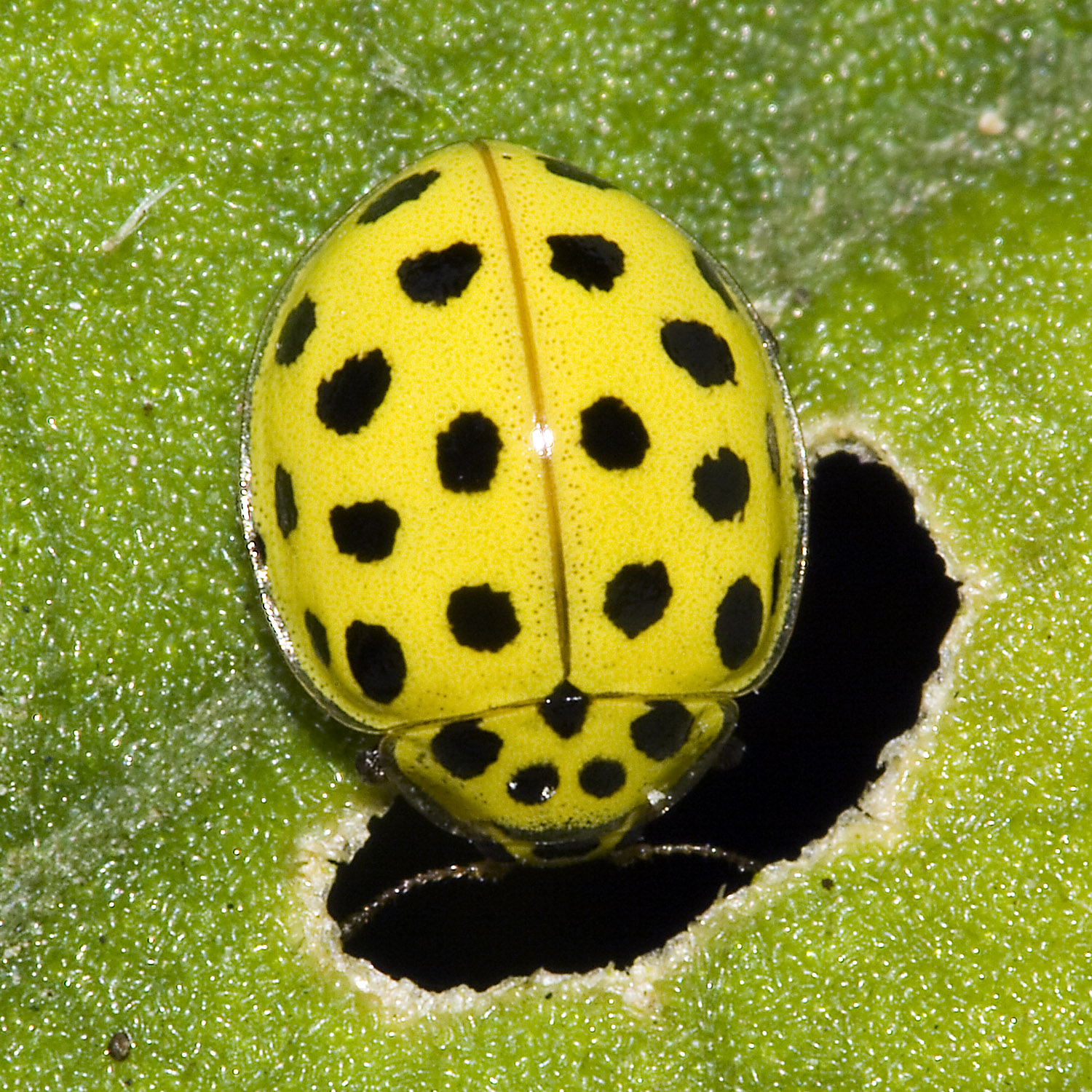
Psyllobora vigintiduopunctata, black spots on yellow

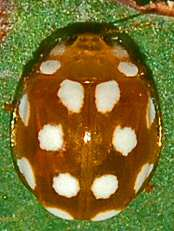
Vibidia duodecimguttata, whitish spots on brown

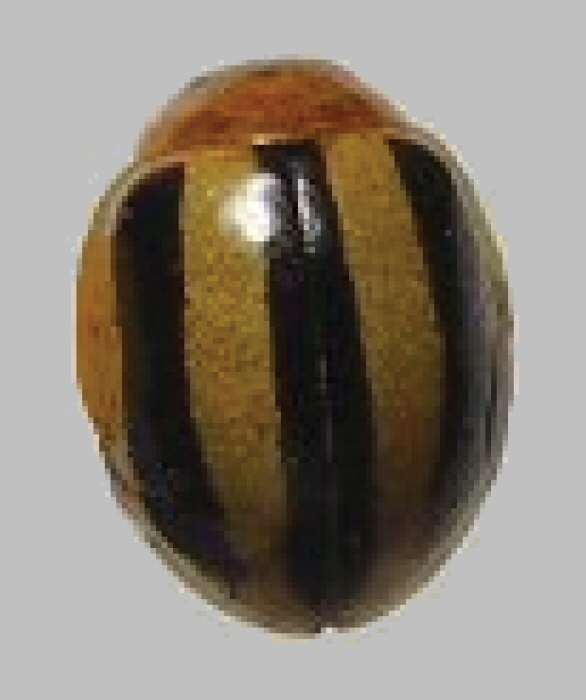
Brumoides suturalis, longitudinally striped

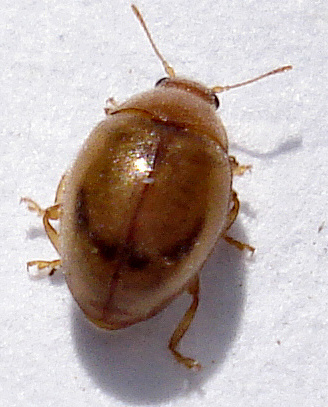
Rhyzobius chrysomeloides, brown, unspotted

== Evolution ==
=== Fossil history ===
Over 6,000 living species of Coccinellidae have been described. They are sparsely preserved in the fossil record. Although molecular clock estimates have placed their origin in the Cretaceous, the oldest fossils of the group are known from the Oise amber of France, dating to the Early Eocene (Ypresian) around 53 million years ago, which belong to the extant genera Rhyzobius and Nephus. The greatest number of fossils comes from the younger Eocene Baltic amber, including members of the extant genera Serangium and Rhyzobius as well as extinct genera belonging to the tribes Microweiseini (Baltosidis) and Sticholotidini (Electrolotis).

=== Phylogeny ===
The Coccinellidae are within the superfamily Coccinelloidea, which in turn is part of the infraorder Cucujiformia, a group containing most of the plant-eating beetles. They form the majority of the species in the Coccinelloidea; many of the rest are fungus-feeding beetles or scavengers.

- Cucujiformia
  - - - - Lymexyloidea
        - Tenebrionoidea
      - Cleroidea
    - - - Chrysomeloidea
        - Curculionoidea
      - Cucujoidea
  - - Coccinelloidea
      - Bothrideridae and allies
      - - Latridiidae
        - - Akalyptoischiidae
          - - Alexiidae
            - - Corylophidae and allies
              - - Endomychidae
                - Coccinellidae

Coccinellidae have historically been divided into seven subfamilies (Chilocorinae, Coccidulinae, Coccinellinae, Epilachninae, Microweiseinae, Scymninae and Sticholotidinae) and 35 tribes based on morphology. However, genetics studies have called into question the monophyly (single ancestry) of most of these subfamilies. The monophyly of Coccinellinae has the most support.

A 2021 genetic study sampling many species, identified three subfamilies, Microweiseinae (with three tribes), Coccinellinae (26 tribes) and a newly identified group, the Monocoryninae (one tribe). All three subfamilies were strongly supported, but the study noted that although the tribes are mostly monophyletic, their relationships are only weakly supported. The study suggests that the crown group appeared some 143 Mya in the Early Cretaceous, and that the group diversified rapidly during the Late Cretaceous, perhaps because the growth in diversity of angiosperm plants then encouraged the radiation of insects of the clade Sternorrhyncha such as aphids, on which coccinellids could feed.

- Coccinellidae
  - Microweiseinae
  - - Monocoryninae
    - Coccinellinae
      - Stethorini
      - - Coccinellini
        - other tribes

An earlier 2009 study concluded that consumption of scale insects is the most basal diet of Coccinellidae. Aphid-eating evolved three separate times and leaf-eating evolved twice, one of which evolved from a clade that contains both aphid-eating and pollen-eating. The fungi-eating also evolved from aphid-eating.

== Biology and ecology ==
=== Flight ===
Coccinellids mostly fly during the day. Springy, cylindrical veins in the hindwings stiffen when in flight and bend when folding. Folding of the wings is further aided by creases in the membrane. These beetles may migrate long distances to hibernation and breeding sites, and areas with more food. They appear to be drawn to recognisable landmarks. The more crowded an area is, the more individuals leave, but will remain if there are enough prey species to feed on. "Trivial flights" refer to flying while foraging or when finding a place to lay eggs. One study of species in Britain found that coccinellids can fly as far as 120 km (75 mi). They flew at speeds of 30 km/h (19 mph) and could reach altitudes close to 1,100 m (3,600 ft).

Behaviour

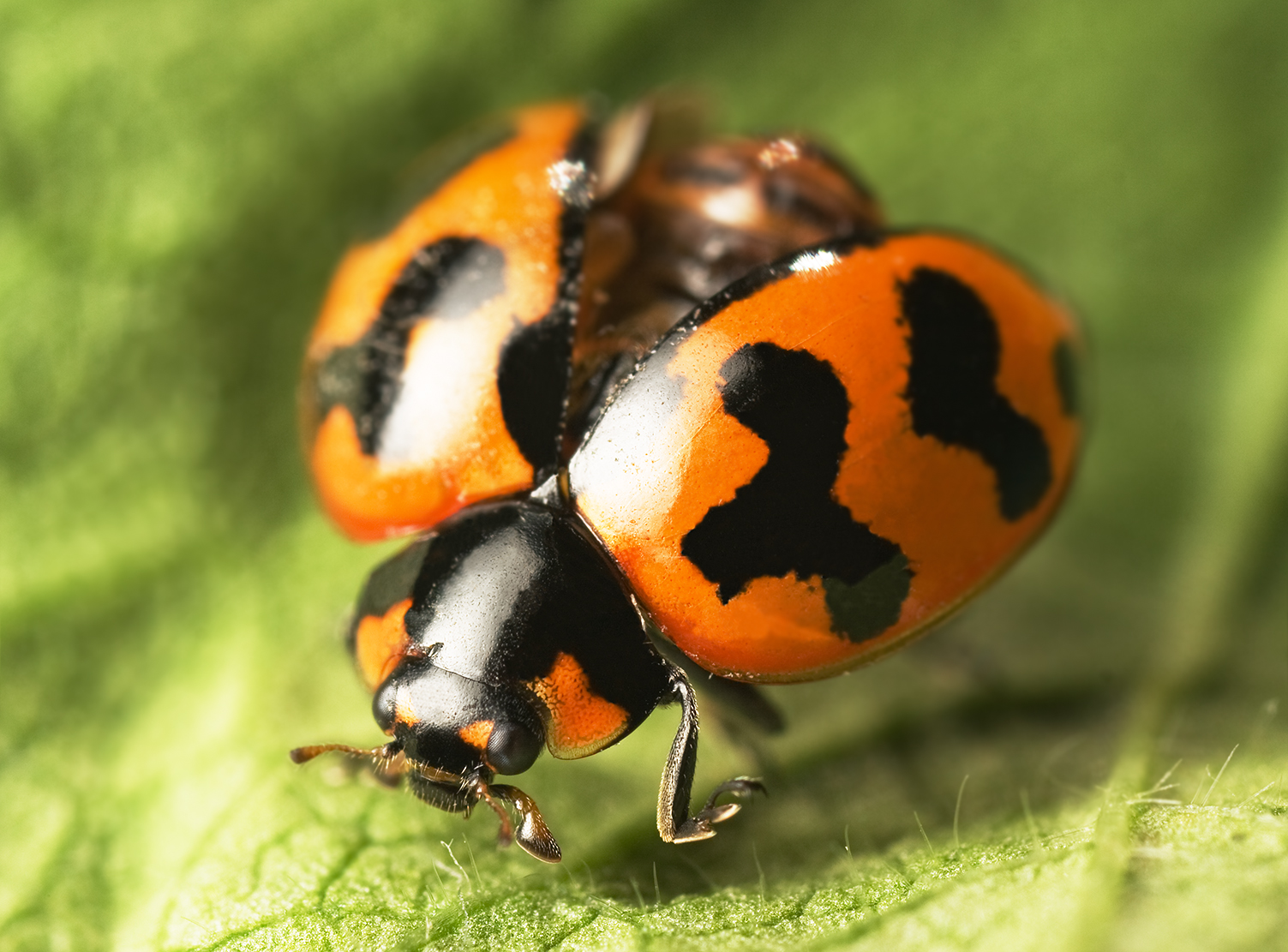
Coccinella transversalis, elytra in the open position

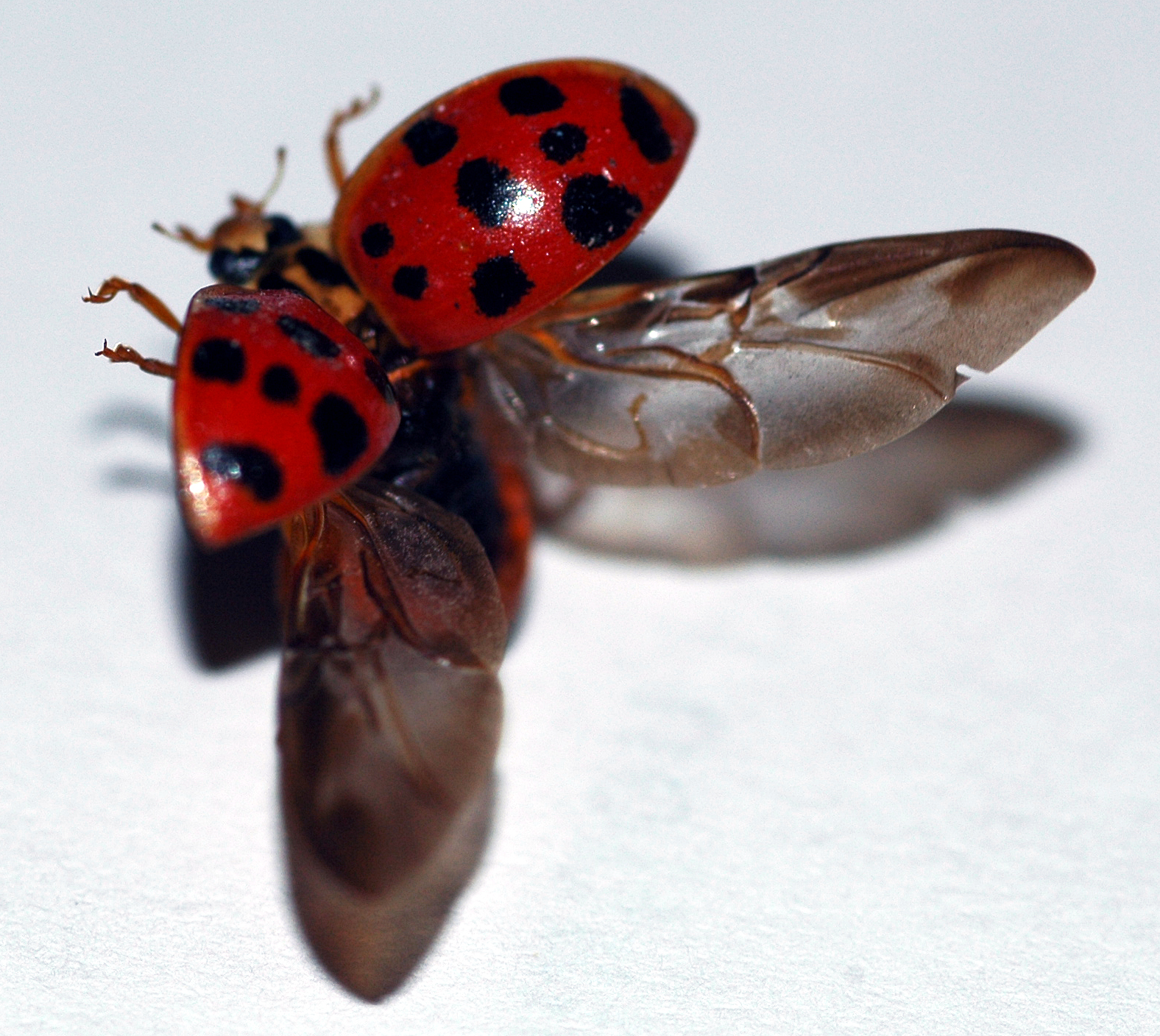
Full wings of a Harmonia axyridis taking flight

=== Life cycle ===
A western polished lady beetle and her eggs near a milkweed aphid colony.

Female western polished lady beetle, eggs maturing, and emerging first instar larvae on narrow-leaf milkweed.

In temperate climates, coccinellids typically breed from late spring to early summer. In warmer temperate regions, reproduction may occur in spring, fall and winter; tropical species reproduce during the wet season. Mating is promiscuous. In some species, females appear to be selective in their partners, preferring males of a certain size and colour. Males produce sperm packets each with 14,000 sperm, and insert three of them into the female, even though she can only hold 18,000 sperm. This is likely a form of sperm competition. Like other insects, coccinellids develop from egg, to larva, to pupa and finally adult. Eggs tend to be bright yellow, and the females lay them close together, standing upright and near where they can access food. The number of eggs in a cluster can vary depending on the species; it is typically in the double digits but some species can lay over a thousand eggs in their lifetime.

After hatching, the larvae will begin eating, including the other eggs in their clutch. Certain species lay extra infertile trophic eggs with the fertile eggs, providing a backup food source for the larvae when they hatch. The ratio of infertile to fertile eggs increases with scarcity of food at the time of egg laying. Larvae typically have four developmental stages with three moults between them. The larva eventually transitions into a pupa; which involves the development of a hunch, the fusion of the legs to the body, and the attachment of the posterior to the surface.

Pupae may be uncovered, partially covered or fully covered by larval skin depending on the species. The pupa is mostly immobile, but the head can move in response to irritation. When the adult emerges, it has its hindwings, while the elytron starts out softer and lighter in colour, with no patterns. The length of each development stage varies based on climate and between species. For Adalia bipunctata, eggs hatch after four to eight days, the larva stage lasts around three weeks and the pupa lasts seven to ten days. Adult coccinellids develop much of their final colouration within hours, but may not fully darken for weeks or months. The lifespan of an adult reaches up to a year.

In temperate areas, coccinellids may hibernate or enter diapause during the winter. Individuals during this period gather in clumps, large or small depending on the species. Overwintering insects can be found both in lowland areas, aggregating under dead vegetation, and at the tops of hills, hibernating under rocks and on grass tussocks. In areas with particularly hot summers, the insects experience summer dormancy or aestivation; in the tropics, coccinellids enter dormancy during the dry season.

Life cycle

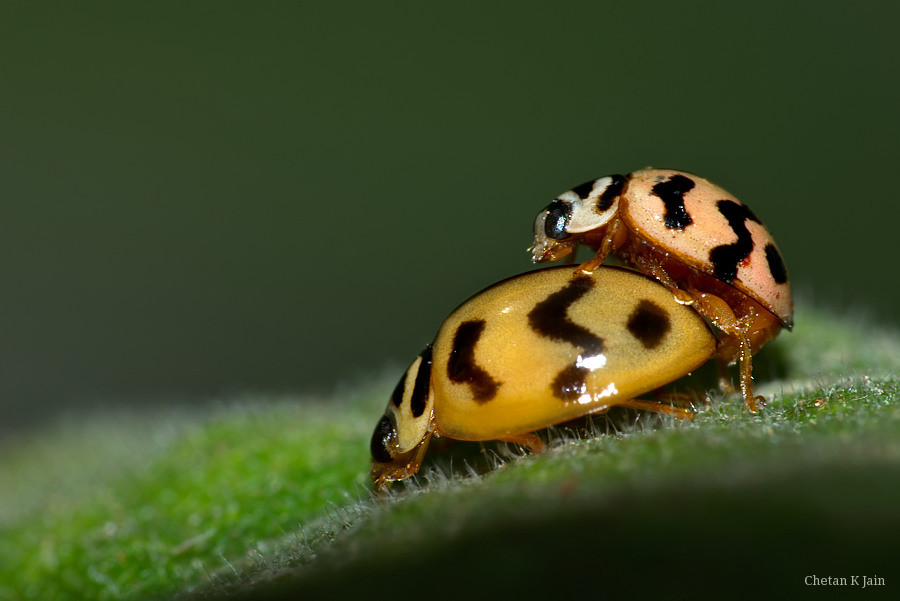
Adults mating

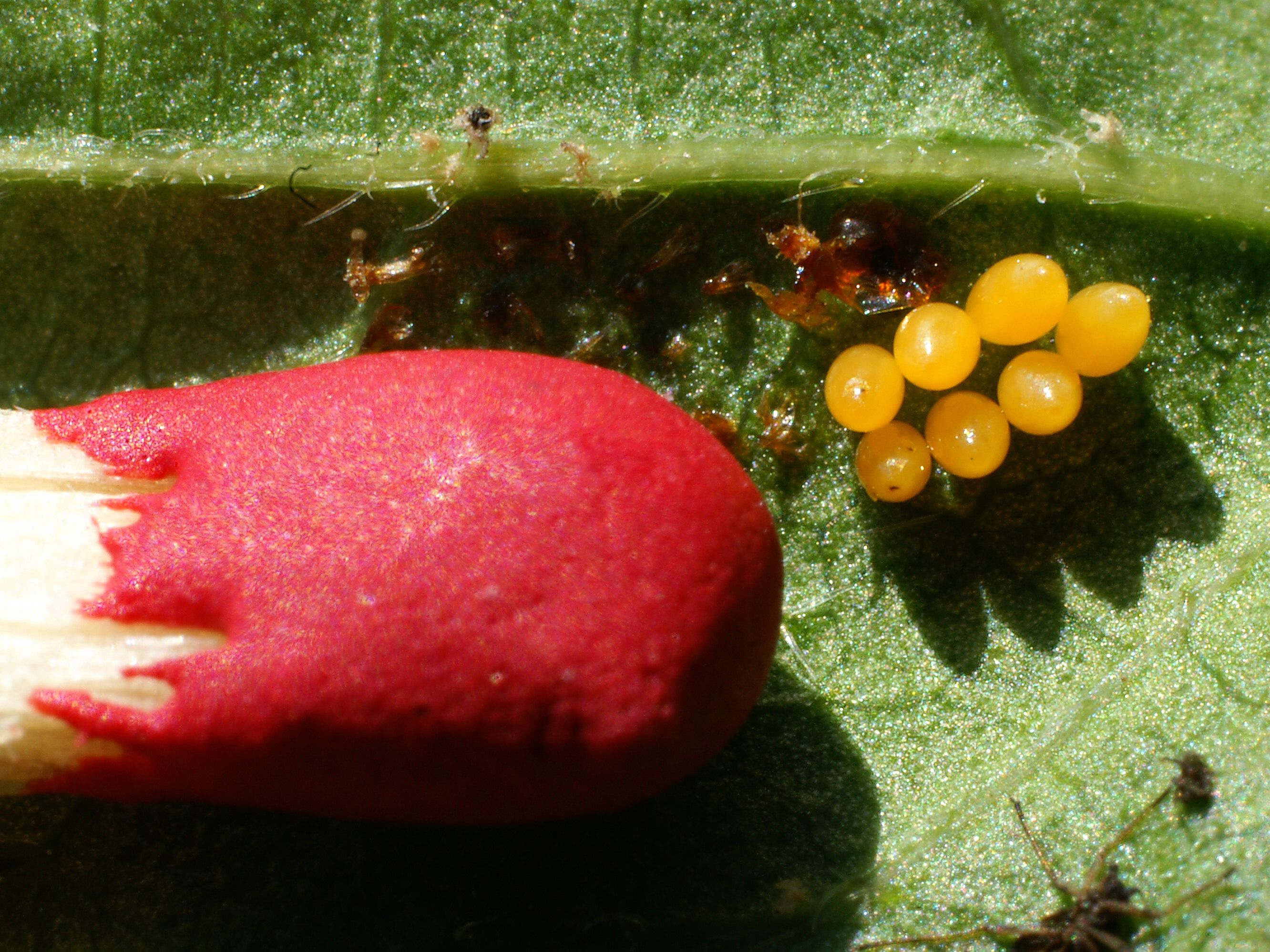
Eggs (match for scale)

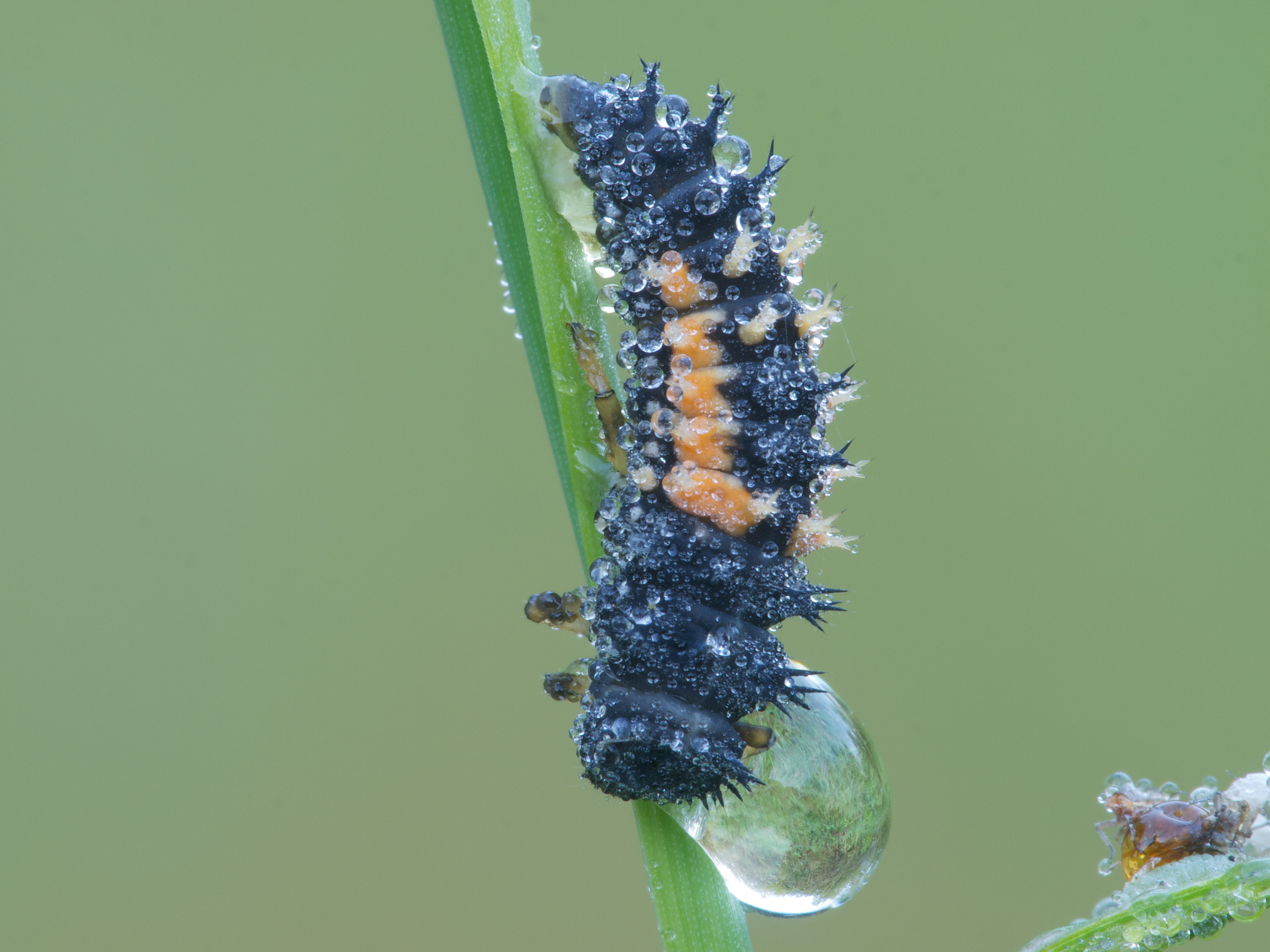
Larva

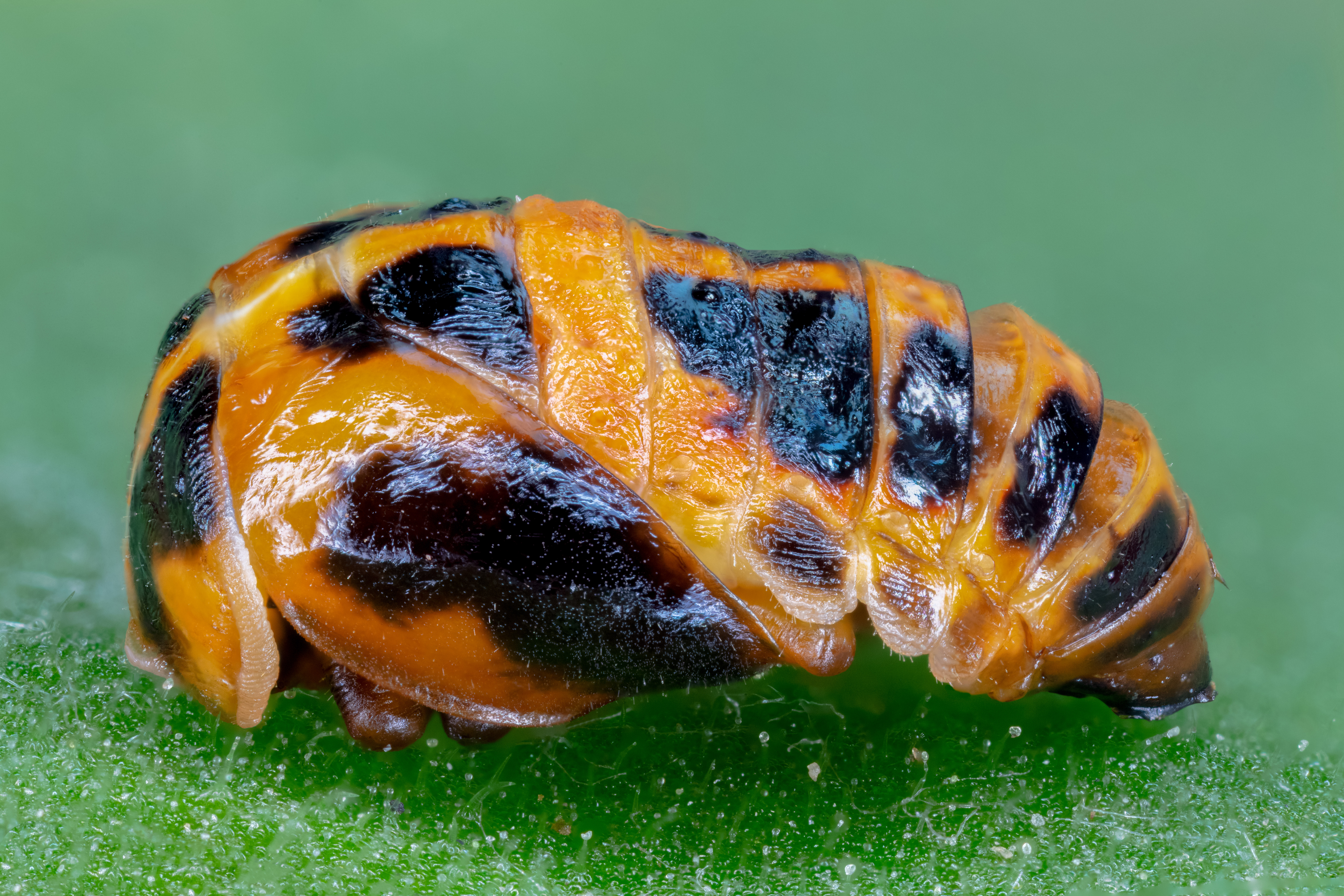
Pupa

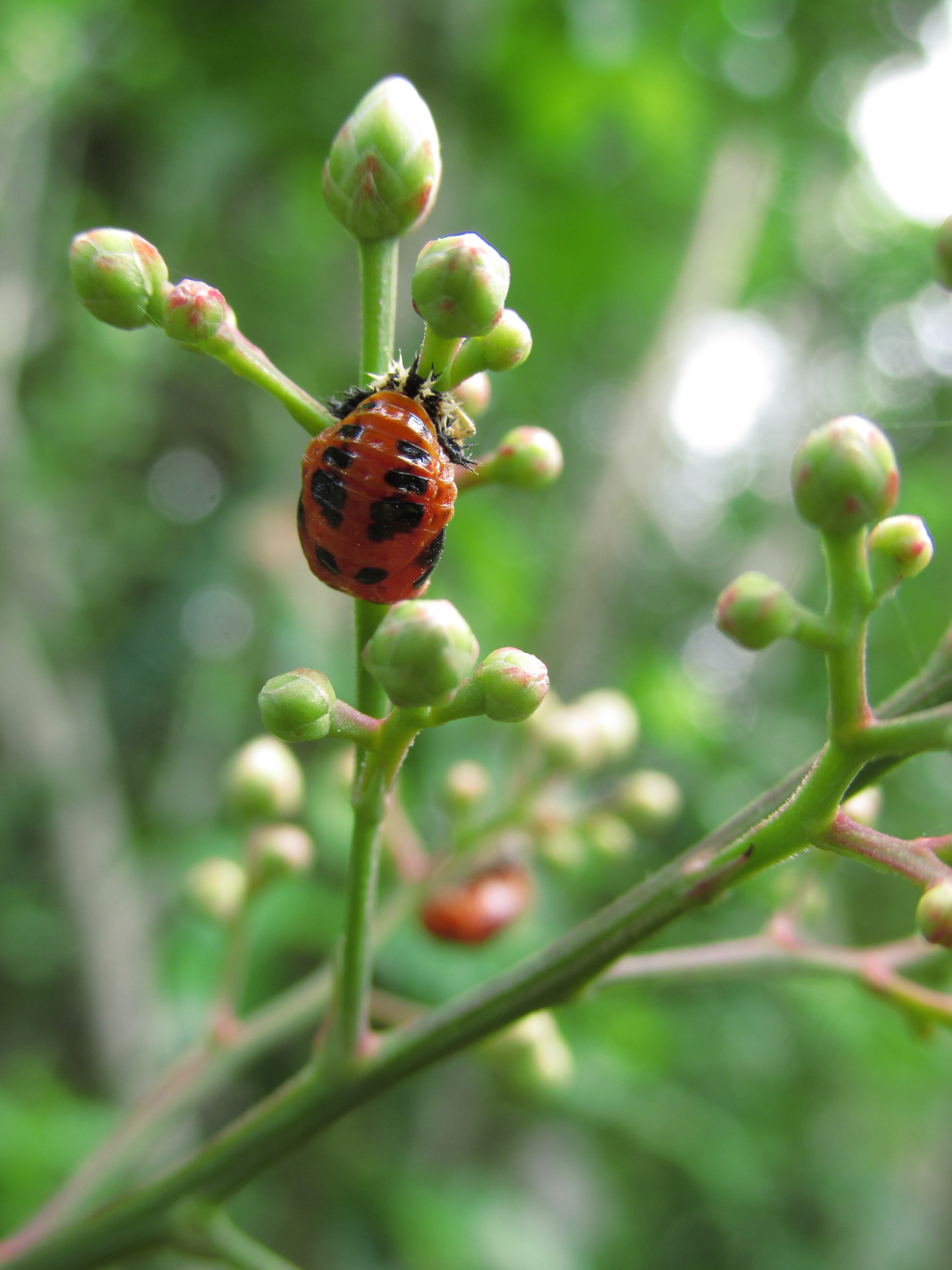
An adult moult. The seven round stars are not yet aligned.

=== Trophic roles ===
Coccinellid larva searching on Paris daisy, variety Madeira deep pink.

Coccinellids act both as predators, prey and parasitic hosts in food webs. The majority of coccinellids are carnivorous and predatory, typically preying on Sternorrhyncha insects like aphids, scale insects, whiteflies, psyllids and adelgids. Some species feed on the larvae of moths and other beetles, as well as mites. Since much of their prey are agricultural pests, coccinellids are considered to be beneficial insects. A 2009 metastudy by Hodek and Honěk found that aphid-eaters constituted around 68 percent of species that live in temperate areas but only 20 percent of species worldwide. Around 36 percent of total species mostly feed on scale insects. Larvae and adults eat the same foods, unlike in other insect groups.

Coccinellid species vary in dietary specificity. An example of a specialist species is those of the genus Stethorus, which feed on spider mites. Aphid-eaters tend to be generalist; they have a high voracity and can multiply quickly in response to outbreaks, and switch to other prey when the ephemeral aphids become scarce. Predators of scale insects tend to be less voracious and are slower breeders and developers; matching their prey. Under pressure from coccinellid predation, aphid species have evolved to become more toxic, forcing coccinellids to develop immunities. Coccinellid predators of aphids need to defend themselves against ants that tend and defend aphids for their honeydew, and coccinellid eggs laid near aphids are disposed of. Some species including Coccinella magnifica and Diomus have adapted to grow within ant nests as larvae, and some like Diomus thoracicus are predators of the brood of the ant Wasmannia auropunctata.

Cannibalism has been recorded in several species; which includes larvae eating eggs or other larvae, and adults feeding on individuals of any life stage. Some coccinellids are mostly non-predatory, such as some species in the genera Epilachna and Henosepilachna. The majority of predatory species may also supplement their diet with other sources of food both in their larval and adult stages. Non-animal matter consumed include leaves, pollen, nectar, sap, fungi, and honeydew. Members of the tribe Halyziini of the subfamily Coccinellinae are obligate fungus feeders.

Coccinellids of any lifestage are preyed on by predators such as birds, spiders, ants and lacewings. They are also hosts for parasites, including some flies, ticks, mites, hymenopterans and nematodes, and pathogens, including bacteria, fungi and protozoa. Wolbachia bacteria infects eggs and kills male zygotes. The promiscuity of Coccinellids has led to their being affected by sexually transmitted infections.

Diet

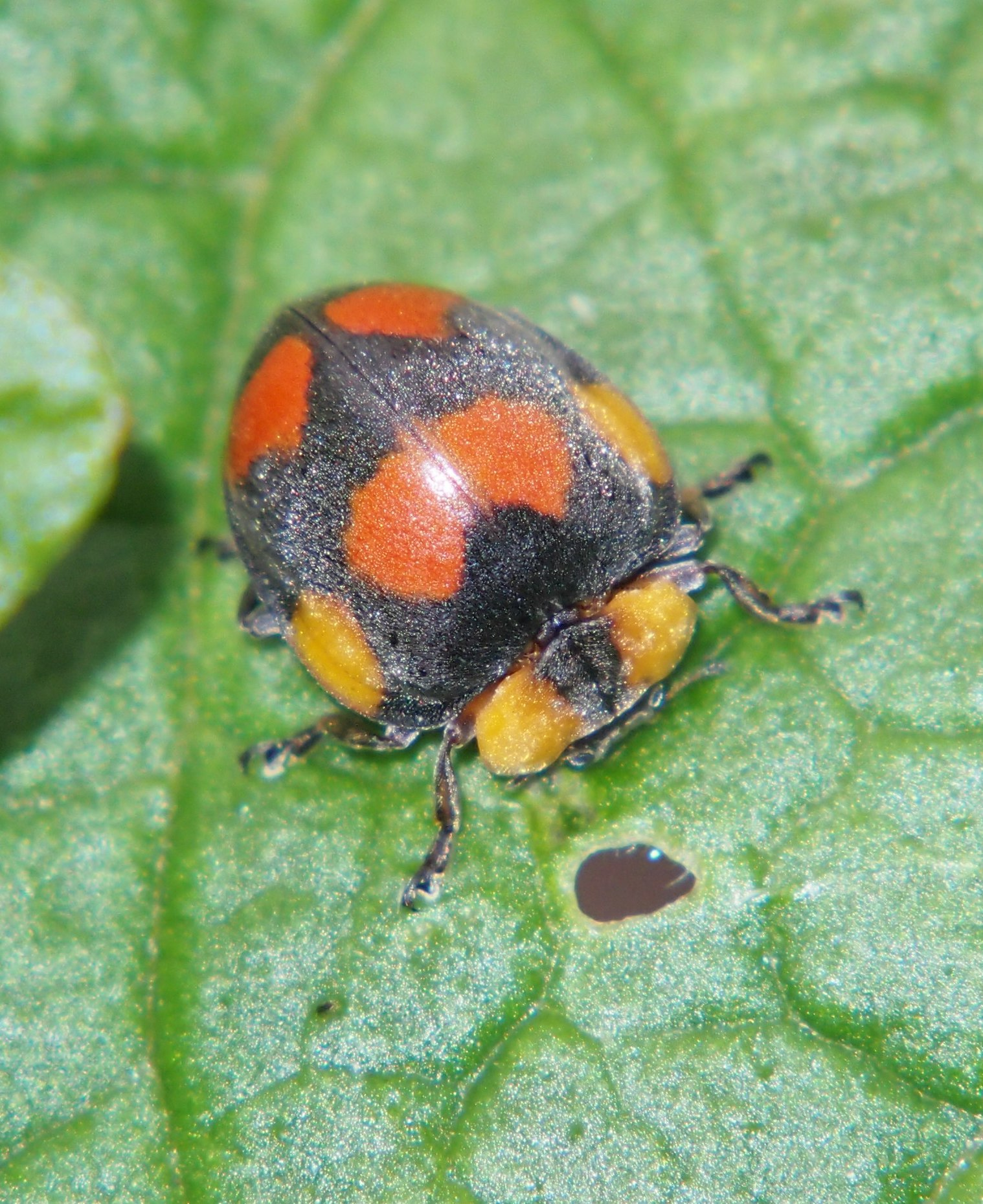
Henosepilachna guttatopustulata, an herbivore, feeding on a potato leaf

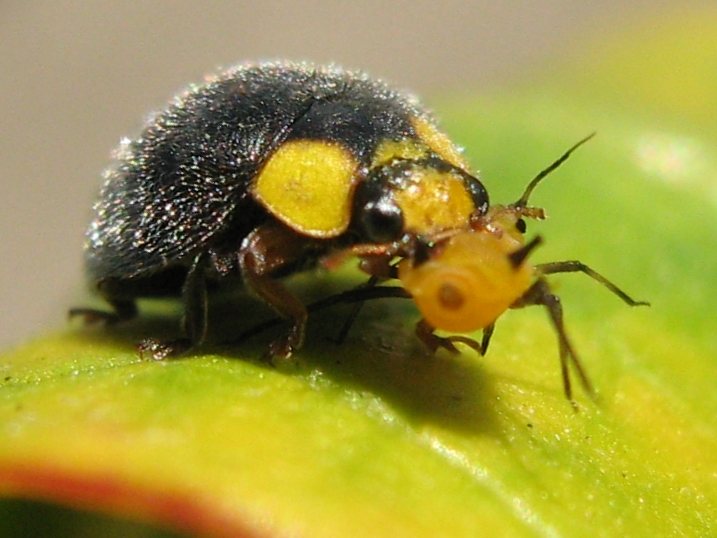
Yellow-shouldered ladybird, Apolinus lividigaster eating an aphid

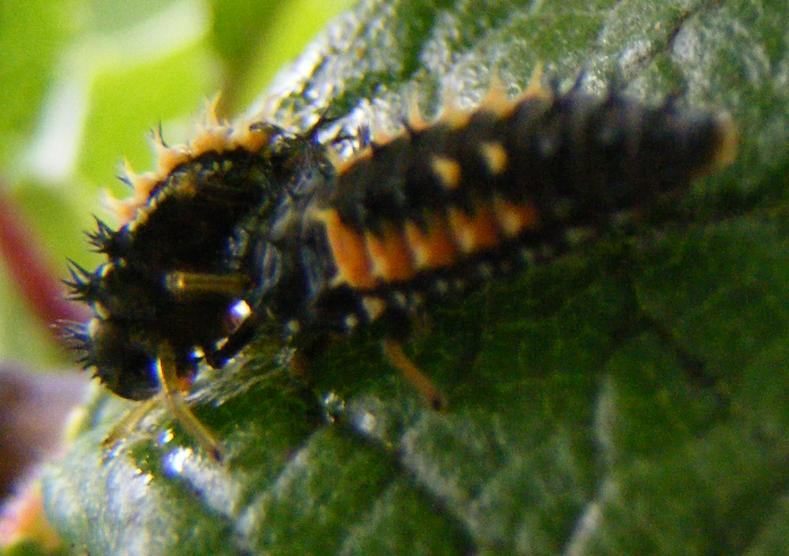
Harmonia axyridis larva cannibalism

=== Defense ===
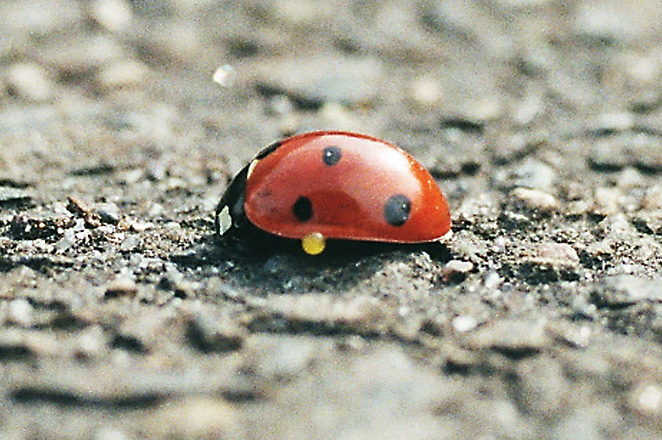
Coccinella septempunctata reflex bleeding

The bright warning colouration of many coccinellids discourage potential predators, warning of their toxicity. A 2015 study of five species found that their colouration honestly signalled their toxicity, implying the warning is genuine. Species with more contrast with the background environment tended to be more toxic. Coccinellid haemolymph (blood) contains toxic alkaloids, azamacrolides and polyamines, as well as foul-smelling pyrazines. Coccinellids can produce at least 50 types of alkaloids. When disturbed, coccinellids further defend themselves with reflex bleeding, exuding drops from their tibio-femoral (knee) joints, effectively presenting predators with a sample of their toxic and bitter body fluid. Predator-deterring poisons are particularly important for the immobile pupa. Access to food can affect the concentration of both pigments and toxins.

The similarity of coccinellid patterning in red and orange with black markings has led to suggestions that they and some species of chrysomelids form Müllerian mimicry rings particularly to defend them from birds. Despite their chemical defenses, coccinellids are preyed on by some clerid beetles in the genus Enoclerus, several species of which are brightly coloured in red and black, and which possibly sequester the toxins of the prey to defend themselves against other predators.

As an anti-predator defense, spiders of the genus Eresus, known as ladybird spiders, have evolved to replicate the patterns of coccinellids. This is a form of Batesian mimicry, as the spiders lack the chemicals. This resemblance is limited to adult male spiders which are actively searching for females and exposed – unlike the females and young, which remain sheltered in burrows.

== Distribution and status ==
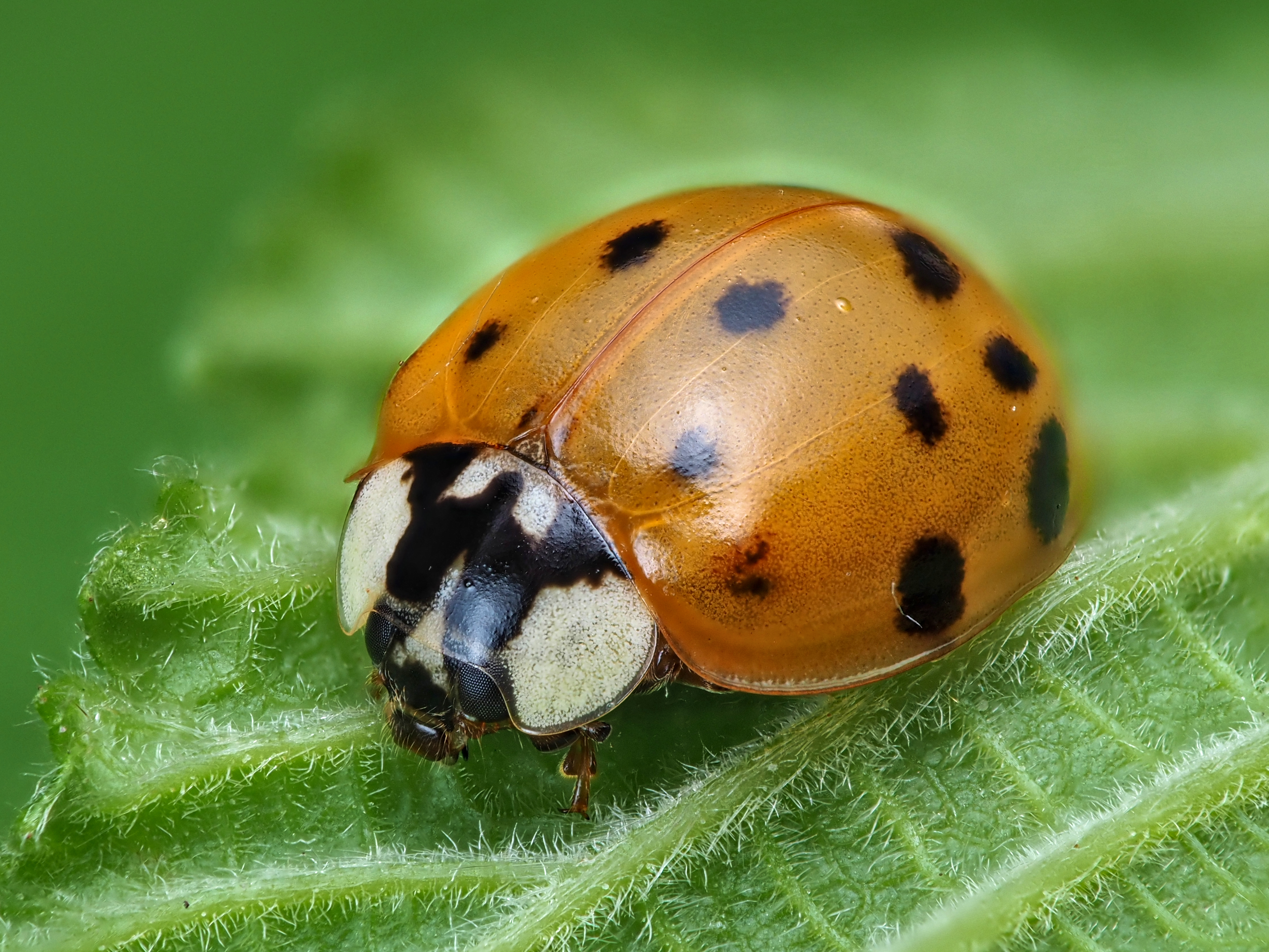
The widespread and invasive Harmonia axyridis

Coccinellidae are found on every continent except Antarctica. Asian and African species are less studied than others. Coccinellids can be found in a variety of habitats, both on the ground and in the trees. They may specialise using certain plants. Some species can live in extreme environments such as high mountains, arid deserts, and cold regions. Several of the most famous species have wide ranges, but others are more endemic and possibly threatened.

Threats to coccinellids include climate change, agriculture, urbanisation, and invasive species. Coccinellid biodiversity will likely be affected by the rising of both average temperatures and heat fluctuations. Climate change may lead to smaller larvae and increase energy, metabolic needs, and interspecific predation. Agriculture and urbanisation threatens these insects though habitat destruction, homogenisation, and the use of pesticides. Invasive threats include other coccinellids, particularly C. septempunctata in North America and H. axyridis globally. These invaders outcompete the native species and eat their eggs.

As of 2022, the IUCN Red List does not list the conservation status for any coccinellid, though there is an IUCN SSC Ladybird Specialist Group. Conservationists have suggested several measures for protecting the insects, including citizen science and education programs, habitat preservation and restoration, prevention of the spread of invasive species, and a global monitoring program.

== Relationship to humans ==
=== Biological control ===
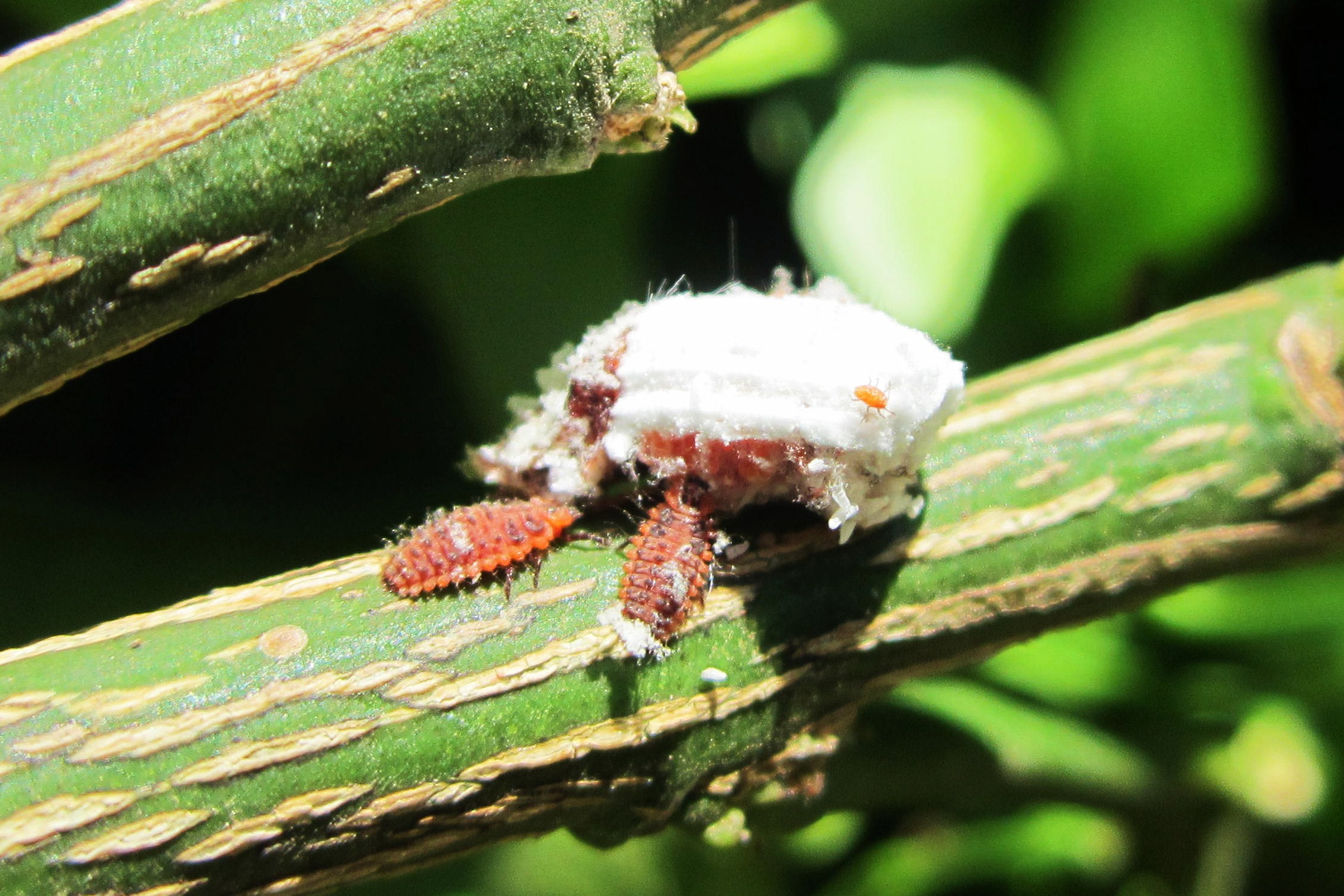
Biological control: larval Novius cardinalis feeding on Icerya purchasi

Coccinellids have been valued in biological pest control, as they prey on agricultural pests such as aphids and scale insects. Their importance in controlling pests was noted as far back as 1814 in England. Their efficiency can vary: sometimes they have a relatively small effect on aphid populations; at others they cause significant seasonal declines.

Several species have been introduced to areas outside their native range; the first being the vedalia beetle, Novius cardinalis. The larva of the species was introduced to California in 1887 from Australia, to protect citrus trees from cottony cushion scale. The project was markedly successful, costing $1,500 in 1889, making it "a textbook example of the great potential of classical biological control as a tactic for suppressing invasive pests." The beetle was then used in 29 countries, again with success; reasons for this include its high prey specificity, fast development, multiple generations each year, efficient discovery of host patches, and larval development completed on a single host insect.

There have been many further attempts to use coccinellid species against pests, with varying degrees of success. Scale insect-eating coccinellids have been more successfully used than aphid predators. Out of 155 deliberate introductions meant to control aphids by the year 2000, only one was deemed to be "substantially successful". This is due to aphid-eating species being fast-breeding, generalist and voracious, and thus difficult to control.

=== As pests ===
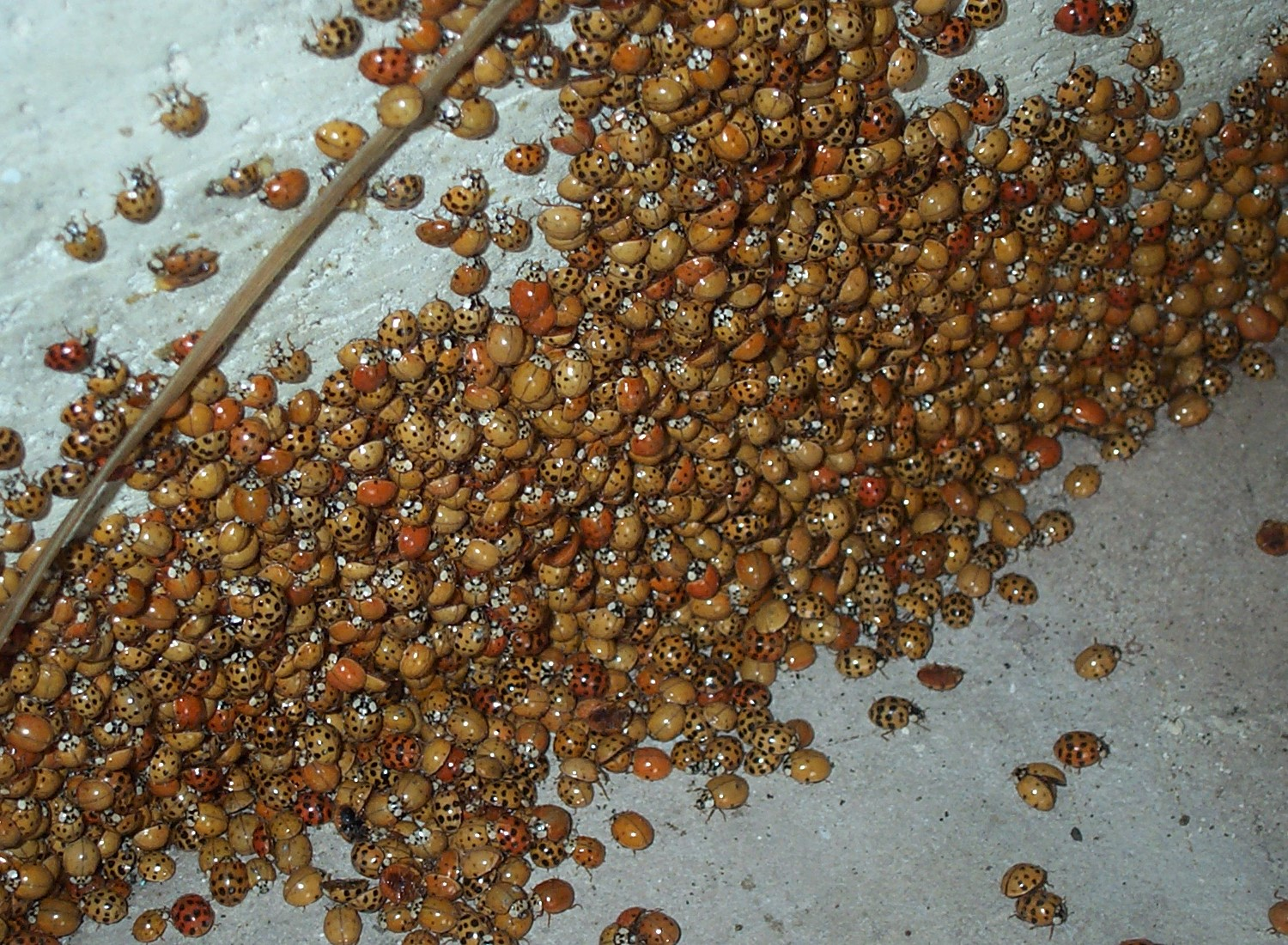
Cluster of invasive Asian lady beetles inside a farm building after the fall harvest in South Dakota

Coccinellids can also act as pests. Harmonia axyridis is native to East Asia, but has been introduced to the Americas, Europe and Africa. In North America, this species begins to appear indoors in the autumn when they leave their summer feeding sites to search out places to stay for winter. Typically, when temperatures warm to the mid-60s °F (around 18 °C) in the late afternoon, they swarm onto or into buildings illuminated by the sun from nearby fields and forests. After an abnormally long period of hot, dry weather in the summer of 1976 in the UK, a marked increase in the aphid population was followed by a "plague" of the native Coccinella septempunctata; there were many reports of people being bitten as the supply of aphids dwindled.

H. axyridis, C. septempunctata and Hippodamia convergens are the most common causes of ladybird taint in wine. As few as 1.3 to 1.5 coccinellids per 1 kilogram (2.2 lb) of grapes can affect wine quality when they are present during the wine-making process. The Mexican bean beetle is an agricultural pest as it primarily feeds on plants, especially legumes, instead of insects.

=== In culture ===
Coccinellids have had important roles in culture and religion, being associated with luck, love, fertility and prophecy. "Ladybird" is an affectionate term for someone, such as a loved one. In European folklore, an insect acts as a matchmaker, crawling on a woman and then flying to their true love. Coccinellids have been said to predict the future, particularly weather conditions and how well the crops will grow.

In Christianity, coccinellids have been seen as the literal gatekeepers of Heaven. A Swedish name for the insects, Himmelska nycla, means "Keys of Heaven". Jews have referred to the insects as the "Cow of Moses our Teacher". The Cherokee have revered them as the "Great Beloved Woman"; this was used as a title for the highest-ranking woman in the government, who would be painted in the colours and patterns of the insect during ceremonies.

Coccinellids have been popularly featured in poems and nursery rhymes, the most famous being Ladybird! Ladybird!. This has come in several forms, including:

Ladybird, ladybird, fly away home,
Thy house is on fire, thy children all roam,
Except little Nan, who sits on her pan,
Weaving gold laces as fast as she can.

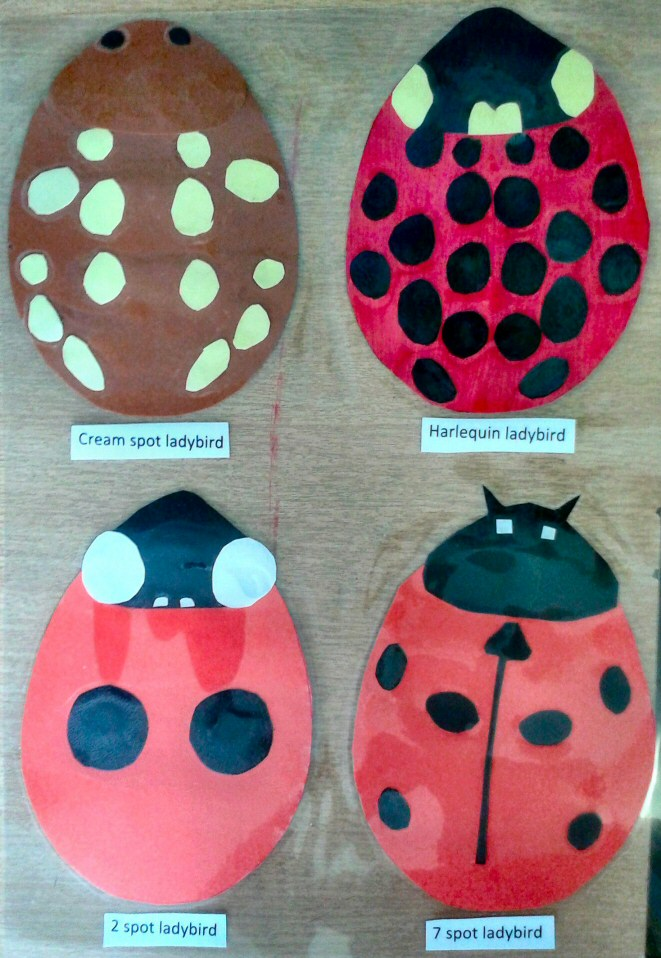
Card cutout ladybirds for a children's
nature trail

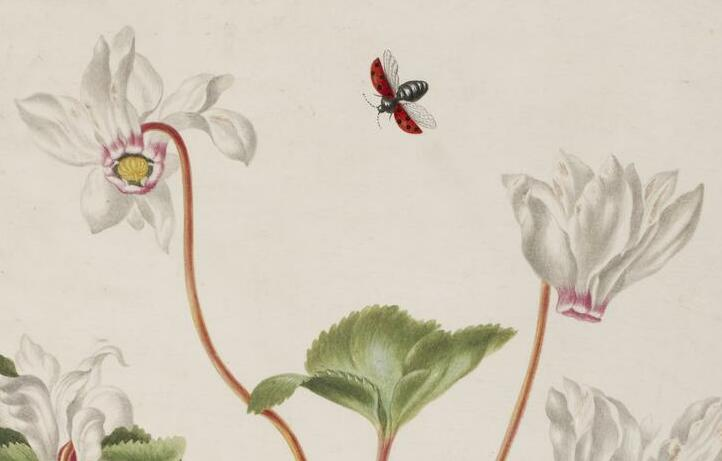
Ladybird flying over cyclamen, detail,
by Maria Sibylla Merian, 1690s

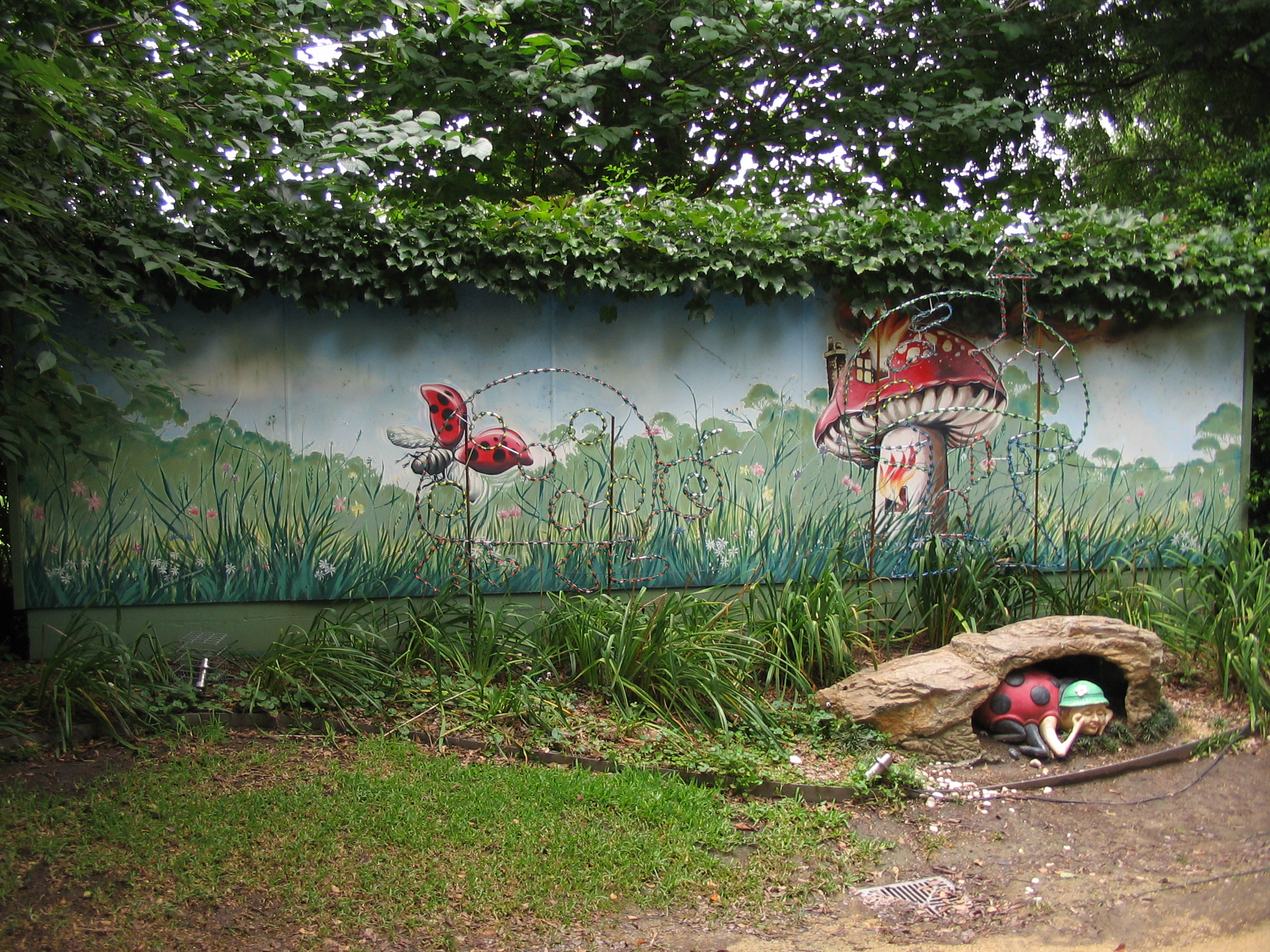
Depiction of the Ladybird! Ladybird! rhyme in Hunter Valley Gardens, Australia

== Sources ==
- Hodek, I.; Honěk, A. (1996). Ecology of Coccinellidae (Series Entomologica, 54). Springer. ISBN 978-0-7923-4177-2.
- Hodek, I; Honěk, A; Van Emden, H. F., eds. (2012). Ecology and Behaviour of the Ladybird Beetles (Coccinellidae). John Wiley & Sons. ISBN 978-1-118-22321-5. OCLC 792685088.
- Majerus, M (2016). Roy, H. E.; Brown, P. M. J. (eds.). A Natural History of Ladybird Beetles. Cambridge University Press. ISBN 978-1-107-11607-8.
