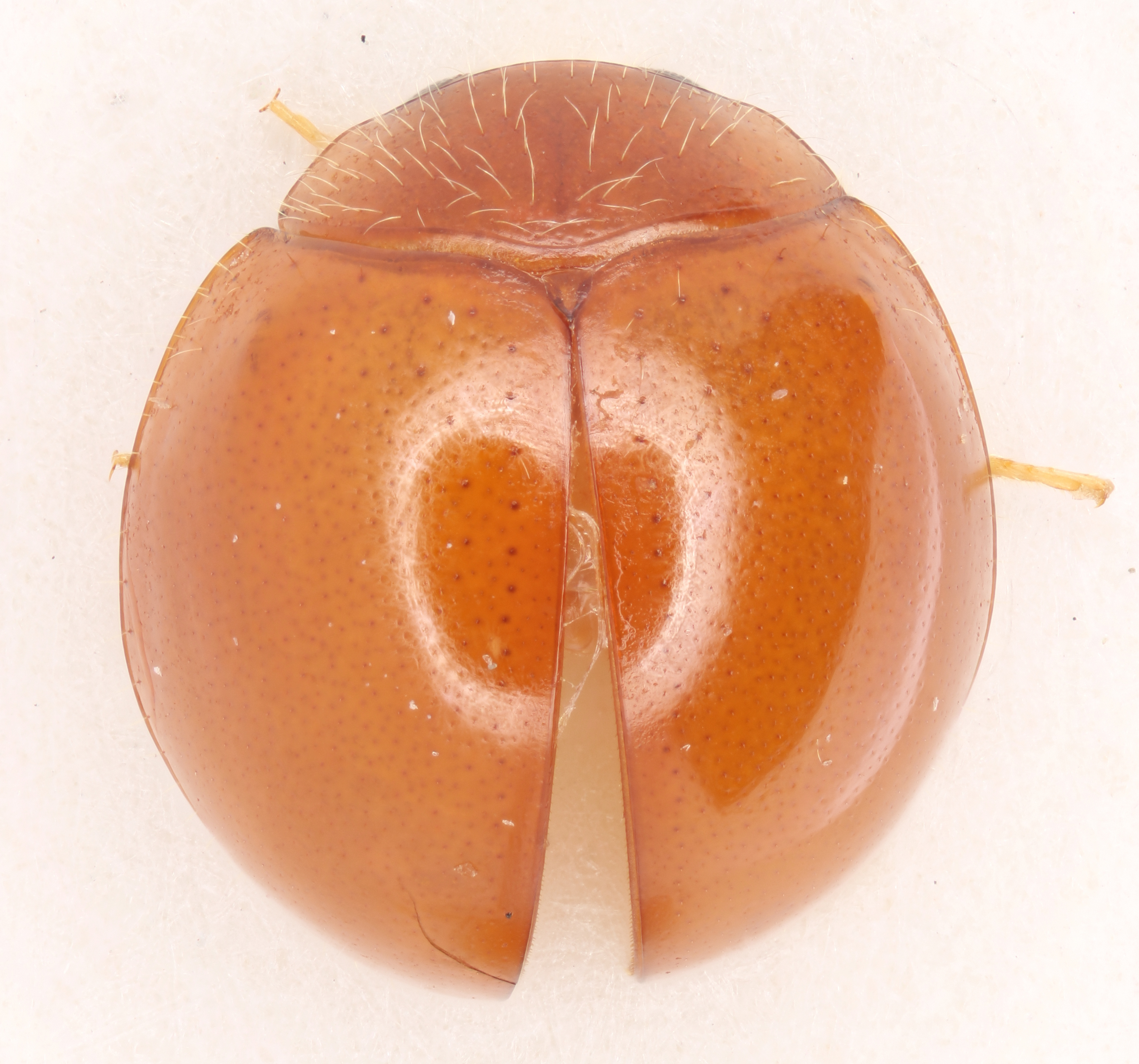
- Serangium parcesetosum adult

Scientific classification
- Kingdom: Animalia
- Phylum: Arthropoda
- Clade: Pancrustacea
- Class: Insecta
- Order: Coleoptera
- Suborder: Polyphaga
- Infraorder: Cucujiformia
- Family: Coccinellidae
- Subfamily: Microweiseinae
- Tribe: Serangiini
- Genus: Serangium; Blackburn, 1889

Type species
- Serangium mysticum Blackburn, 1889

Synonyms
- Semichnoodes Weise, 1892; Catana Chapin, 1940

= Serangium =

Genus of beetles

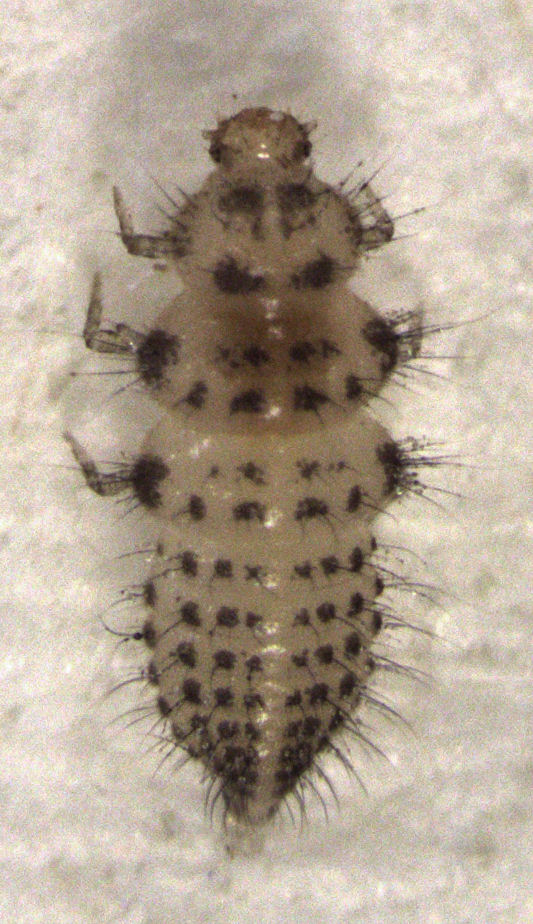
Serangium maculigerum larva, New Zealand

Serangium is a genus in the lady beetle family (Coccinellidae).

The genus was described by Blackburn in 1889, working in Australia. It had 45 described species in 2011, mainly from the Oriental Region.

In 2018, fossils of two species assigned to the genus, S. twardowskii and S. gedanicum, were described from Baltic amber of Eocene age.

Serangium maculigerum, the citrus whitefly ladybird, is a predator of pest insects such as Orchamoplatus citri, the Australian citrus whitefly.

== Species ==
extant

- Serangium adustum
- Serangium bakeri
- Serangium bellum
- Serangium bimaculatum
- Serangium bomicum
- Serangium buettikeri
- Serangium centrale
- Serangium chapini
- Serangium cinctum
- Serangium clauseni
- Serangium comperei
- Serangium contortum
- Serangium coxale
- Serangium decorsei
- Serangium digitiforme
- Serangium dimidiatum
- Serangium drepanicum
- Serangium dulongjiang
- Serangium giffardi
- Serangium glorious
- Serangium haleemae
- Serangium hanamense
- Serangium howdenorum
- Serangium japonicum
- Serangium kunowi
- Serangium latilobum
- Serangium leigongicum
- Serangium luzonicum
- Serangium lygaeum
- Serangium maculigerum
- Serangium magnipunctatum
- Serangium magnum
- Serangium metasternale
- Serangium microscopicum
- Serangium montazerii
- Serangium monteithi
- Serangium monticola
- Serangium mysticum
- Serangium nitidum
- Serangium parcesetosum
- Serangium punctatum
- Serangium punctum
- Serangium ruficolle
- Serangium ryukyuense
- Serangium sabahense
- Serangium sculptum
- Serangium serratum
- Serangium spilotum
- Serangium suffusum
- Serangium toamasinae
- Serangium trimaculatum
- Serangium xinpingense
- Serangium yam
- Serangium yasumatsui

fossil

- S. gedanicum Szawaryn & Szwedo 2018
- S. kalandyki Szawaryn 2019
- S. twardowskii Szawaryn & Szwedo 2018
