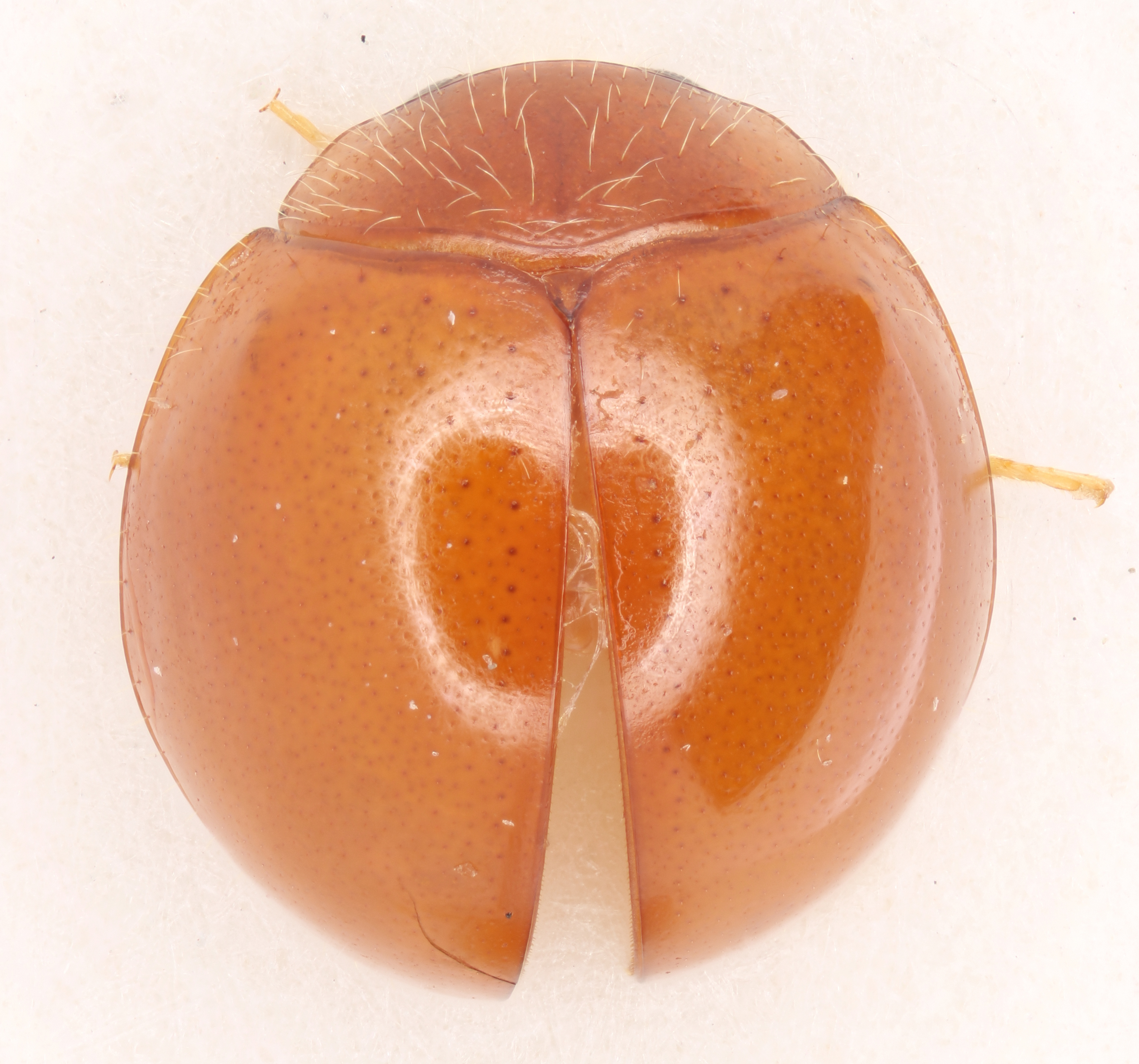
- Serangium parcesetosum adult

Scientific classification
- Kingdom: Animalia
- Phylum: Arthropoda
- Clade: Pancrustacea
- Class: Insecta
- Order: Coleoptera
- Suborder: Polyphaga
- Infraorder: Cucujiformia
- Family: Coccinellidae
- Subfamily: Microweiseinae
- Tribe: Serangiini; Pope, 1962

= Serangiini =

Tribe of beetles

Serangiini is a tribe of ladybird beetles most notable for preying on whiteflies, an agricultural pest.

== Distribution ==
Currently, Serangiini mainly inhabit tropical regions, with a few taxa residing in more temperate regions.

== Genera ==
- Catanella (Miyatake, 1961)
- Delphastus (Casey, 1899)
- Microscymnus (Champion, 1913)
- Microserangium (Miyatake, 1961)
- Pangia (Wang & Ren, 2012)
- Serangium (Blackburn, 1889)
