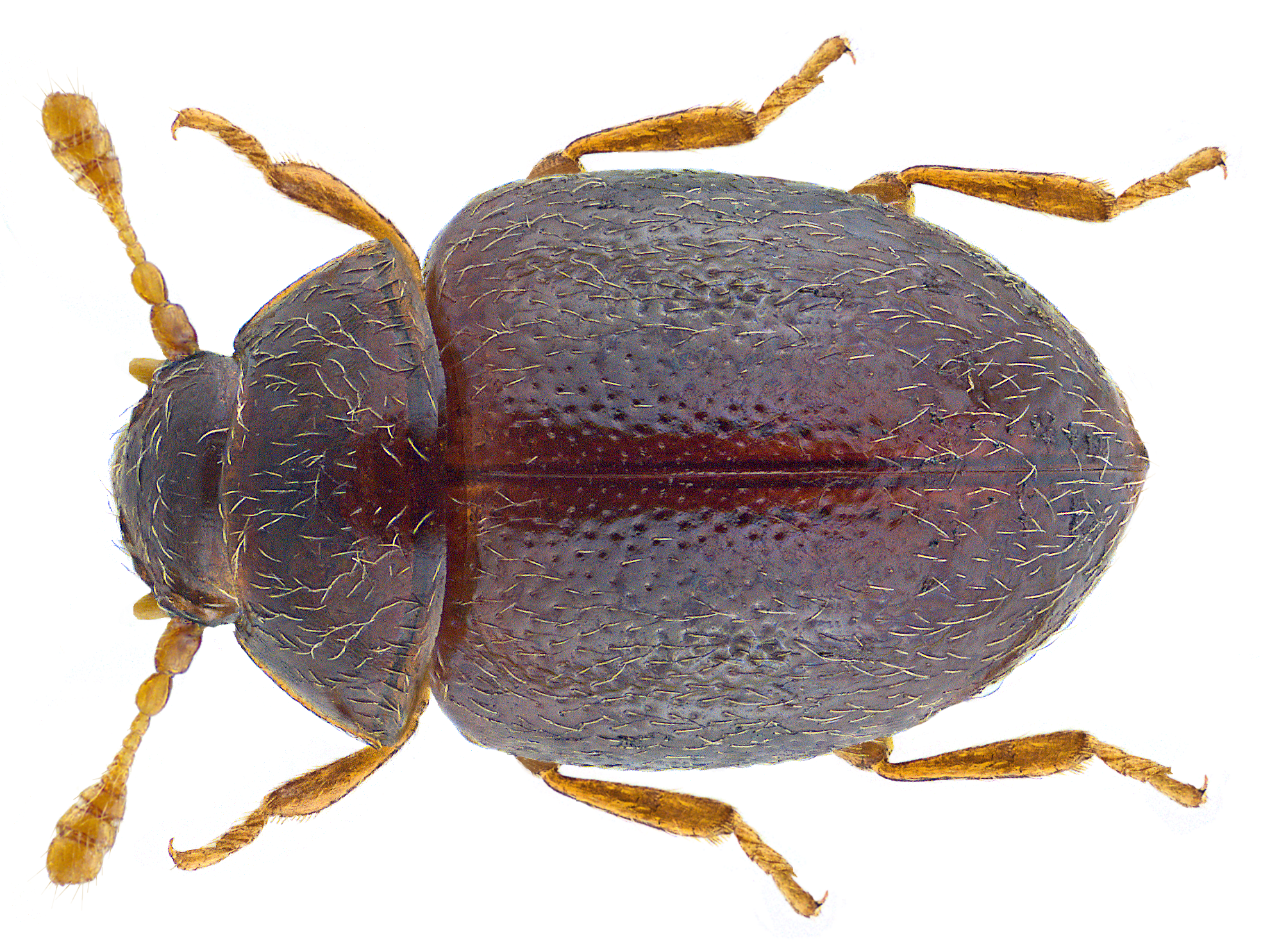
- Sphaerosoma pilosum (Panzer, 1793) Size: 1.5 mm.

Scientific classification
- Kingdom: Animalia
- Phylum: Arthropoda
- Clade: Pancrustacea
- Class: Insecta
- Order: Coleoptera
- Suborder: Polyphaga
- Infraorder: Cucujiformia
- Superfamily: Coccinelloidea
- Family: Alexiidae; Imhoff, 1856
- Genus: Sphaerosoma; Stephens, 1832

Synonyms
- Sphaerosoma Samouelle, 1819 (Nom. Nud.); Alexia Stephens, 1833; Hygrotophila Chevrolat in Dejean, 1836; Lamprosphaerula Apfelbeck, 1910; Neosphaerula Apfelbeck, 1910; Arthrosphaerula Apfelbeck, 1915

= Alexiidae =

Family of beetles

Alexiidae is a family of beetles. It contains a single genus, Sphaerosoma, formerly included within the family Cerylonidae, with around 50 species which are native to the western Palearctic. Species of Sphaerosoma are very small, around 1 to 2 mm in length rounded beetles with clubbed antennae. They are fungivores, having been observed feeding on mushrooms, and have also been found in leaf litter and on decaying bark.

== Taxonomy ==
There has been considerable confusion regarding the type species and authorship of the genus; most older sources consider the author and species to be Sphaerosoma quercus Samouelle, 1819. That name is now considered to be a nomen nudum, and the valid name for Samouelle's species is Sphaerosoma piliferum (Müller, 1821). The type species is now considered to be Sphaerosoma quercus Stephens, 1832, which is itself a junior synonym of Sphaerosoma pilosum (Panzer, 1793). Alexiidae has been recovered as part of the superfamily Coccinelloidea as the sister group of Latridiidae.

== Species ==
- Sphaerosoma algiricum (Reitter, 1889)
- Sphaerosoma alutaceum (Reitter, 1883)
- Sphaerosoma antennarium Apfelbeck, 1909
- Sphaerosoma apuanum Reitter, 1909
- Sphaerosoma bicome Peyerimhoff, 1917
- Sphaerosoma bosnicum (Reitter, 1885)
- Sphaerosoma carniolicum Apfelbeck, 1915
- Sphaerosoma carpathicum (Reitter, 1883)
- Sphaerosoma circassicum (Reitter, 1888)
- Sphaerosoma clamboides (Reitter, 1888)
- Sphaerosoma compressum (Reitter, 1901)
- Sphaerosoma corcyreum (Reitter, 1883)
- Sphaerosoma csikii Apfelbeck, 1915
- Sphaerosoma diversepunctatum Roubal, 1932
- Sphaerosoma fiorii Ganglbauer, 1899
- Sphaerosoma globosum (Sturm, 1807)
- Sphaerosoma hemisphaericum Ganglbauer, 1899
- Sphaerosoma hispanicum Obenberger, 1917
- Sphaerosoma laevicolle (Reitter, 1883)
- Sphaerosoma latitarse Apfelbeck, 1915
- Sphaerosoma lederi (Reitter, 1888)
- Sphaerosoma leonhardi Apfelbeck, 1915
- Sphaerosoma libani Sahlberg, 1913
- Sphaerosoma maritimum (Reitter, 1904)
- Sphaerosoma merditanum Apfelbeck, 1915
- Sphaerosoma meridionale (Reitter, 1883)
- Sphaerosoma nevadense (Reitter, 1883)
- Sphaerosoma normandi Peyerimhoff, 1917
- Sphaerosoma obscuricorne Obenberger, 1917
- Sphaerosoma obsoletum (Reitter, 1883)
- Sphaerosoma paganetti Obenberger, 1913
- Sphaerosoma piliferum (Müller, 1821)
- Sphaerosoma pilosellum (Reitter, 1877)
- Sphaerosoma pilosissimum (Frivaldszky, 1881)
- Sphaerosoma pilosum (Panzer, 1793)
- Sphaerosoma pubescens (Frivaldszky, 1881)
- Sphaerosoma punctatum (Reitter, 1878)
- Sphaerosoma puncticolle (Reitter, 1883)
- Sphaerosoma purkynei Obenberger, 1917
- Sphaerosoma rambouseki Apfelbeck, 1916
- Sphaerosoma reitteri (Ormay, 1888)
- Sphaerosoma rotundatum Obenberger, 1913
- Sphaerosoma scymnoides (Reitter, 1885)
- Sphaerosoma seidlitzi (Reitter, 1889)
- Sphaerosoma shardaghense Apfelbeck, 1915
- Sphaerosoma solarii Reitter, 1904
- Sphaerosoma sparsum Reitter, 1909
- Sphaerosoma sturanyi Apfelbeck, 1909
- Sphaerosoma subglabrum Peyerimhoff, 1917
- Sphaerosoma sublaeve (Reitter, 1883)
- Sphaerosoma tingitanum Peyerimhoff, 1917
- Sphaerosoma vallambrosae (Reitter, 1885)
- Sphaerosoma winneguthi Apfelbeck, 1915
