= Oxylaemus =

Scientific classification
- Kingdom: Animalia
- Phylum: Arthropoda
- Class: Insecta
- Order: Coleoptera
- Suborder: Polyphaga
- Infraorder: Cucujiformia
- Family: Teredidae
- Genus: Oxylaemus; Erichson, 1845

Synonyms
- Redistes Casey, 1924

Genus of beetles

Oxylaemus is a genus of beetles in the family Teredidae. There are at least three described species in Oxylaemus.

== Species ==
These three species belong to the genus Oxylaemus:

- Oxylaemus americanus LeConte, 1863
- Oxylaemus californicus Crotch, 1874
- Oxylaemus variolosus (Dufour, 1843)
