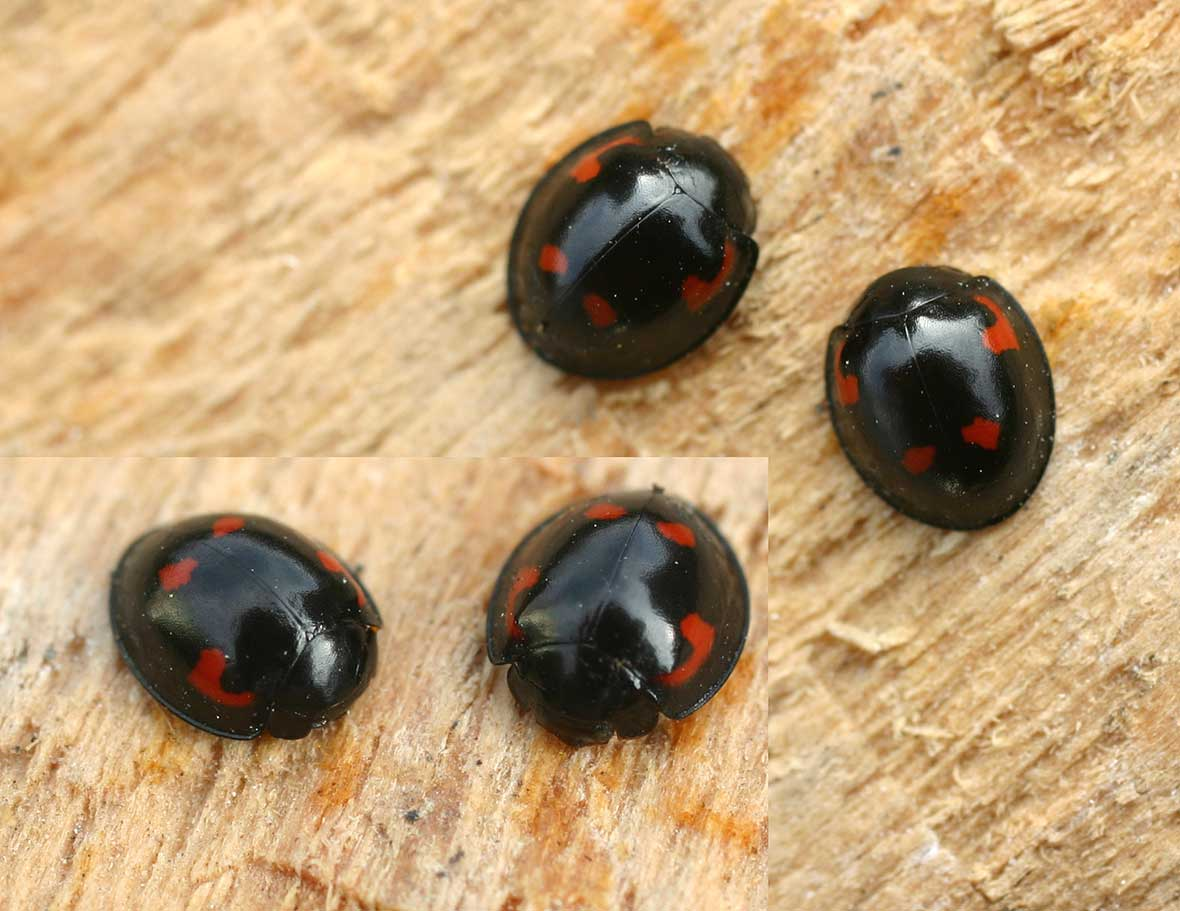
- Adult Brumus quadripustulatus (Chilocorini) ©Entomart

Scientific classification
- Domain: Eukaryota
- Kingdom: Animalia
- Phylum: Arthropoda
- Class: Insecta
- Order: Coleoptera
- Suborder: Polyphaga
- Infraorder: Cucujiformia
- Family: Coccinellidae
- Subfamily: Chilocorinae; Mulsant, 1846

Tribes
- Chilocorini; Platynaspidini; Telsimiini

= Chilocorinae =

Subfamily of beetles

The Chilocorinae are a subfamily of ladybugs in the family Coccinellidae. They feed predominantly on scale insects. They are usually shiny and often have no spots or patterns on their wing covers. Their bodies are in round helmet shapes. They are medium in size and are sometimes seen feeding on cowpea aphids. Some examples include the pine ladybird and kidney-spot ladybird which inhabit the UK, both of which are black ladybirds with red spots. A US example is the twice-stabbed lady beetle.

When disturbed by predators they may reflex bleed, an ability shared with other coccinellids. In winter they may congregate in large groups for protection against predators and for better chances of mating in the spring.
