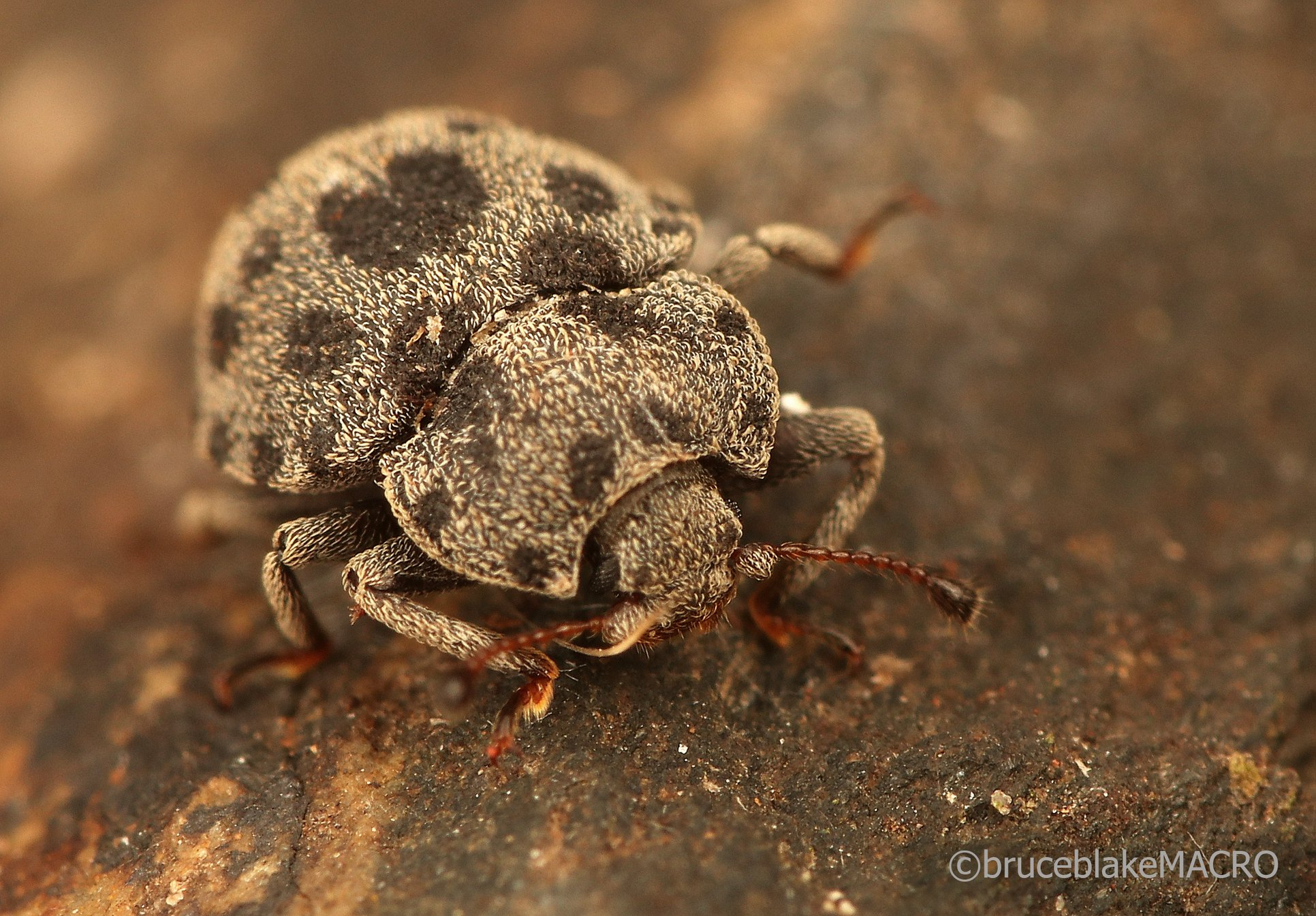
- An adult Notiophygus
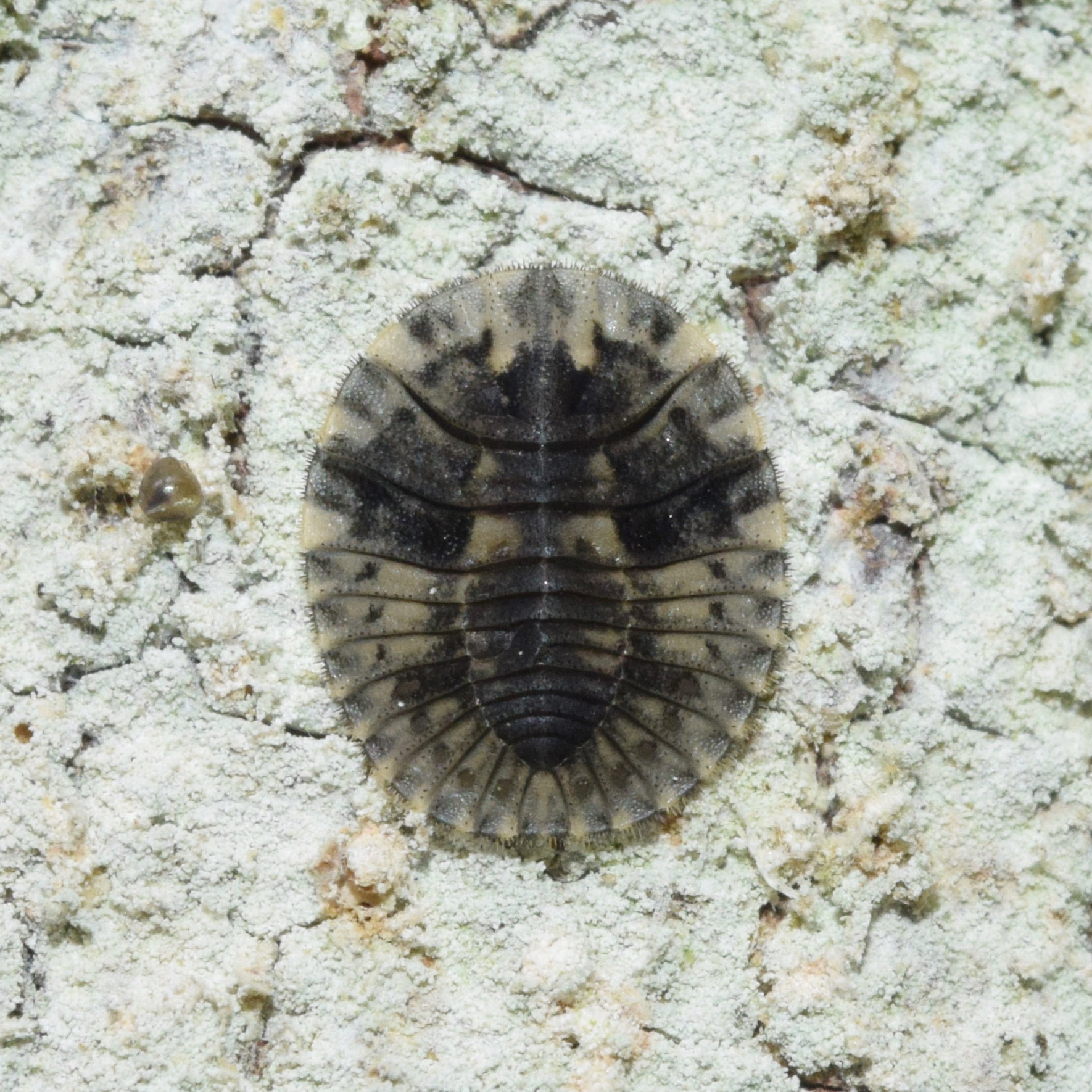
- Discolomatid larva

Scientific classification
- Kingdom: Animalia
- Phylum: Arthropoda
- Clade: Pancrustacea
- Class: Insecta
- Order: Coleoptera
- Suborder: Polyphaga
- Infraorder: Cucujiformia
- Superfamily: Coccinelloidea
- Family: Discolomatidae; Horn, 1878

Synonyms
- Discolomidae; Notiophygidae; Aphanocephalidae

= Discolomatidae =

Family of beetles

Discolomatidae is a family of beetles in the superfamily Coccinelloidea. It contains approximately 400 species in 16 genera, which are found mostly found in tropical regions, being largely absent from temperate regions. They have generally been found associated with decaying vegetation or fungi, and are therefore assumed to be fungivorous. Some species are associated with ants (myrmecophily). The larvae have unusual flattened sclerotised bodies, with heads that are concealed from above.

== Taxonomy ==
- Aphanocephalus (149)
- Cassidoloma (13)
- Cephalophanus (7)
- Discoloma (28)
- Dystheamon (1)
- Fallia (7)
- Holophygus (3)
- Katoporus (3)
- Notiophygus Gory, 1834 (205)
- Parafallia (7)
- Parmaschema (18)
- Pondonatus (2)
- Profallia (4)
- Solitarius (1)
