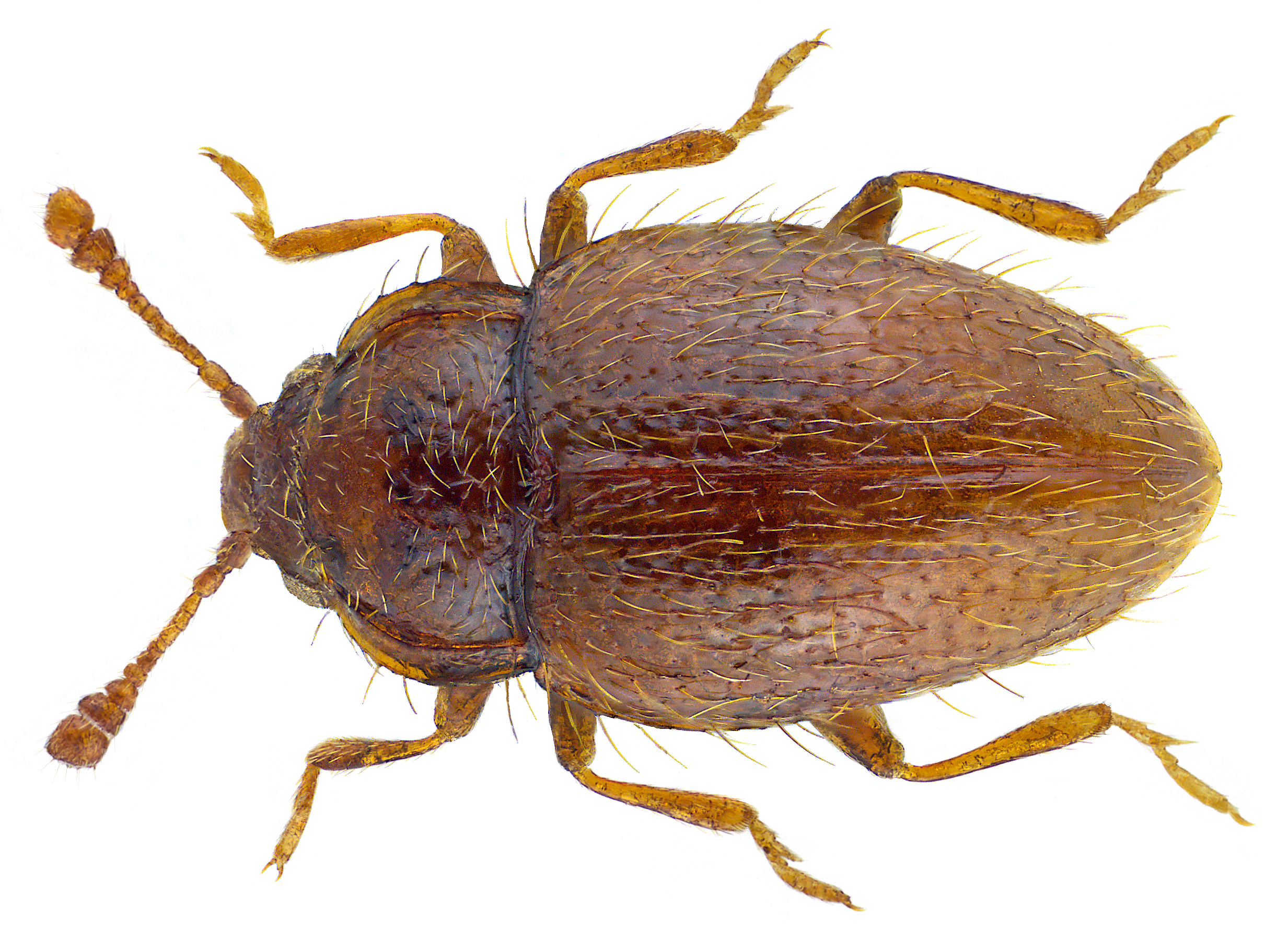
- Mycetaea subterranea
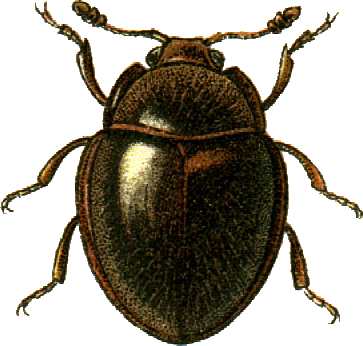
- Agaricophilus reflexus

Scientific classification
- Kingdom: Animalia
- Phylum: Arthropoda
- Clade: Pancrustacea
- Class: Insecta
- Order: Coleoptera
- Suborder: Polyphaga
- Infraorder: Cucujiformia
- Superfamily: Coccinelloidea
- Family: Mycetaeidae; Jacquelin du Val, 1857

Genera
- Mycetaea; Agaricophilus

= Mycetaeidae =

Family of beetles

Mycetaeidae is a family of beetles in the superfamily Coccinelloidea, formerly included within the family Endomychidae. There are two genera currently included in the family, Agaricophilus and Mycetaea, which are morphologically divergent from each other, and it is unclear whether they are closely related. Mycetaea is found in North America, Europe and South Africa, while Agaricophilus is restricted to Europe. While the life history of Agaricophilus is obscure, Mycetaea is known to be mycophagous, feeding on molds.
