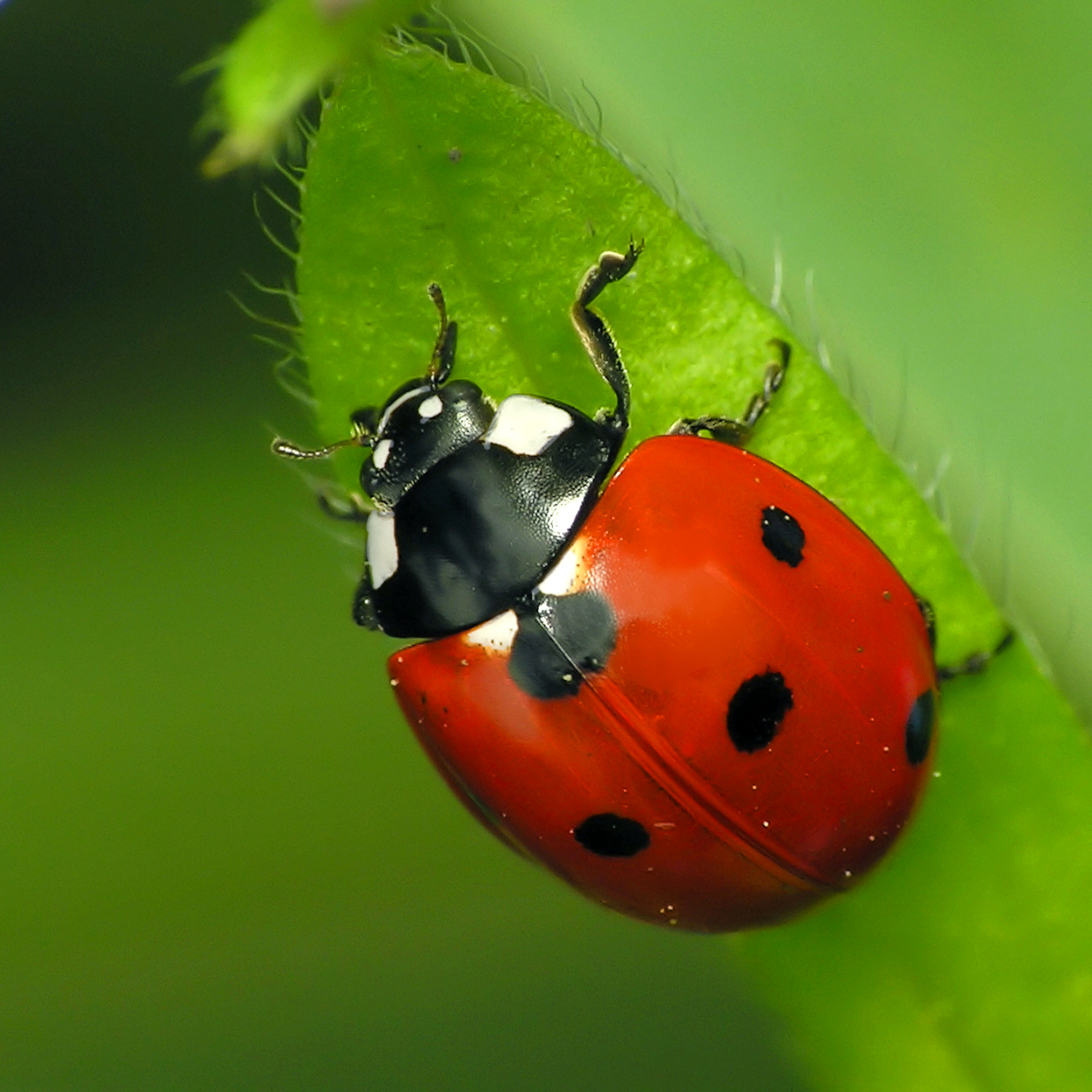
- Seven-Spotted Ladybug (Coccinella septempunctata)

Scientific classification
- Kingdom: Animalia
- Phylum: Arthropoda
- Clade: Pancrustacea
- Class: Insecta
- Order: Coleoptera
- Suborder: Polyphaga
- Infraorder: Cucujiformia
- Superfamily: Coccinelloidea; Latreille, 1807

Families
- see text

= Coccinelloidea =

Coccinelloidea Temporal range: Early Cretaceous–Recent

Superfamily of beetles

Coccinelloidea is a superfamily of beetles in the order Coleoptera, formerly included in the superfamily Cucujoidea. There are more than 10,000 species in Coccinelloidea, including more than 6000 in the lady beetle family Coccinellidae.

== Morphology ==
Adult Coccinelloidea have a reduced tarsal formula (each tarsus with 4 or 3 segments), hind coxae separated by more than 1/3 their width, the intercoxal process of abdominal ventrite 1 usually broadly rounded or truncate, hindwings with reduced anal veins and lacking a closed radial cell, the adeagus resting on its side when retracted and the phallobase usually reduced.

Larval Coccinelloidea have a unisetose pretarsal claw, spiracles that are usually annular, and the sensory appendage of the second antennal segment usually as long as the third segment.

== Families ==
The family constituency of this lineage has changed considerably over time, from as few as four or five recognized families in 1970 to 15 in 2015.

- Cucujiformia
  - - - - Lymexyloidea
        - Tenebrionoidea
      - Cleroidea
    - - - Chrysomeloidea
        - Curculionoidea
      - Cucujoidea
  - - Coccinelloidea
      - Bothrideridae and allies
      - - Latridiidae
        - - Akalyptoischiidae
          - - Alexiidae
            - - Corylophidae and allies
              - - Endomychidae
                - Coccinellidae

- Akalyptoischiidae Lord, Hartley, Lawrence, McHugh, Whiting & Miller, 2010
- Alexiidae Imhoff, 1856
- Anamorphidae Strohecker, 1953
- Bothrideridae Erichson, 1845 (dry bark beetles)
- Cerylonidae Billberg, 1820 (minute bark beetles)
- Coccinellidae Latreille, 1807 (ladybird beetles)
- Corylophidae LeConte, 1852 (minute hooded beetles)
- Discolomatidae Horn, 1878
- Endomychidae Leach, 1815 (handsome fungus beetles)
- Eupsilobiidae Casey, 1895
- Euxestidae Grouvelle, 1908 (well polished beetles)
- Latridiidae Erichson, 1842 (minute brown scavenger beetles)
- Murmidiidae Jacquelin du Val, 1858
- Mycetaeidae Jacquelin du Val, 1857
- Teredidae Seidlitz, 1888
