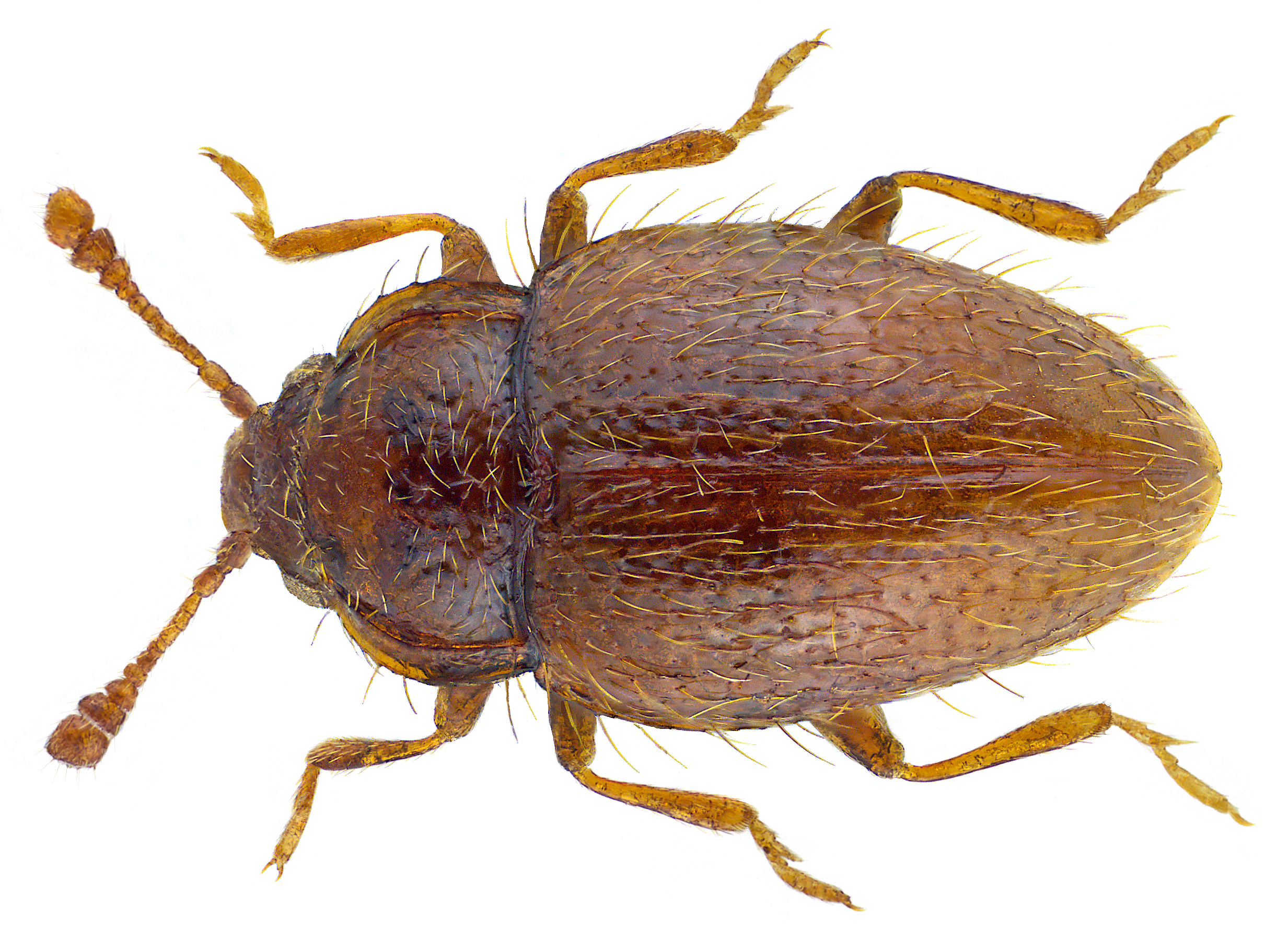
- Mycetaea subterranea

Scientific classification
- Kingdom: Animalia
- Phylum: Arthropoda
- Clade: Pancrustacea
- Class: Insecta
- Order: Coleoptera
- Suborder: Polyphaga
- Infraorder: Cucujiformia
- Family: Mycetaeidae
- Genus: Mycetaea; Stephens, 1830

= Mycetaea =

Genus of beetles

Mycetaea is a genus of beetles in the family Mycetaeidae. There is at least one described species in Mycetaea, M. subterranea.

Formerly, this family was often placed in family Erotylidae.
