= Rustleria =

Scientific classification
- Domain: Eukaryota
- Kingdom: Animalia
- Phylum: Arthropoda
- Class: Insecta
- Order: Coleoptera
- Suborder: Polyphaga
- Infraorder: Cucujiformia
- Family: Teredidae
- Genus: Rustleria; Stephan, 1989

Genus of beetles

Rustleria is a genus of beetles in the family Teredidae. There is one described species in Rustleria, R. obscura.
