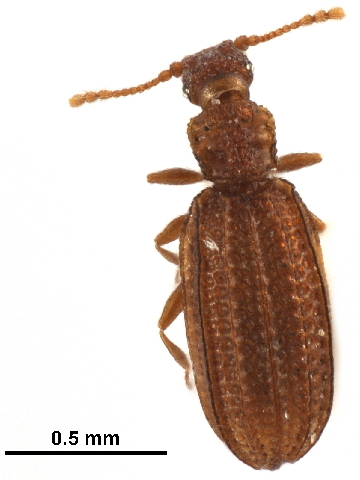

Scientific classification
- Kingdom: Animalia
- Phylum: Arthropoda
- Clade: Pancrustacea
- Class: Insecta
- Order: Coleoptera
- Suborder: Polyphaga
- Infraorder: Cucujiformia
- Superfamily: Coccinelloidea
- Family: Akalyptoischiidae; Lord et al., 2010
- Genus: Akalyptoischion; Andrews, 1976

Species
- See text

= Akalyptoischion =

Genus of beetles

Akalyptoischion is a genus of coccinelloid beetle, the only member of the family Akalyptoischiidae. It was formerly included within the family Latridiidae but a molecular phylogenetic analysis found that it did not belong to that family. There are at least 24 described species in Akalyptoischion, which are native to western North America. Members of the genus are flightless, found in oak leaf litter and in the nests of pack rats.

== Species ==
The following species belong to the genus Akalyptoischion:

- Akalyptoischion anasillos Andrews, 1976
- Akalyptoischion atrichos Andrews, 1976
- Akalyptoischion bathytrematos Hartley, Andrews & McHugh, 2007
- Akalyptoischion chandleri Andrews, 1976
- Akalyptoischion delotretos Hartley, Andrews & McHugh, 2007
- Akalyptoischion diadeletron Hartley, Andrews & McHugh, 2007
- Akalyptoischion dyskritos Hartley, Andrews & McHugh, 2007
- Akalyptoischion echinos Hartley, Andrews & McHugh, 2007
- Akalyptoischion gigas Hartley, Andrews & McHugh, 2007
- Akalyptoischion giulianii Andrews, 1976
- Akalyptoischion hadromorphus Hartley, Andrews & McHugh, 2007
- Akalyptoischion heptalocos Hartley, Andrews & McHugh, 2007
- Akalyptoischion heterotrichos Hartley, Andrews & McHugh, 2007
- Akalyptoischion hormathos Andrews, 1976
- Akalyptoischion lasiosus Hartley, Andrews & McHugh, 2007
- Akalyptoischion leptosoma Hartley, Andrews & McHugh, 2007
- Akalyptoischion parechinos Hartley, Andrews & McHugh, 2007
- Akalyptoischion pogonias Hartley, Andrews & McHugh, 2007
- Akalyptoischion polytremetron Hartley, Andrews & McHugh, 2007
- Akalyptoischion prionotus Hartley, Andrews & McHugh, 2007
- Akalyptoischion quadrifoveolata (Fall, 1899)
- Akalyptoischion sleeperi Andrews, 1976
- Akalyptoischion texas Hartley, Andrews & McHugh, 2007
- Akalyptoischion tomeus Andrews, 1976
