= Ludwig Imhoff =

Swiss physician and entomologist

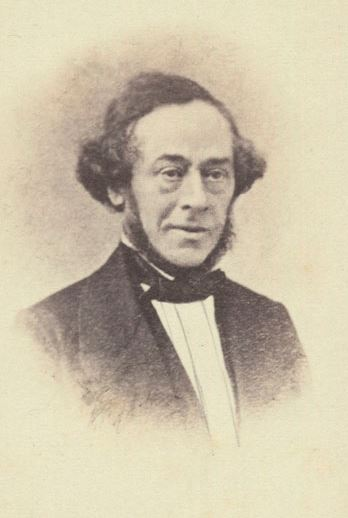
Ludwig Imhoff

Ludwig Imhoff (22 October 1801 in Basel - 13 September 1868 ) was a Swiss medical doctor and entomologist.

Imhoff was the son of a merchant Hieronymus Imhoff and his wife Johanna nee Wenk in Basel. He attended the Samuel Hopf school in Basel, which followed the educational methods of Johann Heinrich Pestalozzi. He then attended the Pädagogium in Basel. In 1820 he began law studies but switched to medicine. He studied medicine in Strasbourg, Heidelberg, Halle and Berlin. In 1826, after completing his studies, he returned to Basel. Here he worked as a doctor and naturalist. He married Maria Julia Auguste Heitz in 1829. Ludwig Imhoff habilitated at the University of Basel as a zoologist with a focus on entomology. Also from 1826 he began his work on the entomological collection of the Natural History Museum of Basel. He also made a collection of European insects for the Museum of Comparative Zoology at Harvard University.

Imhoff was a member of several natural history societies, as from 1826 Naturforschenden Gesellschaft des Kantons Basel and from 1827 Schweizerischen Naturhistorischen Gesellschaft. From 1859 to 1868–1870 he was Präsident der Schweizerischen Entomologischen Gesellschaf. He was particularly active in the field of classification of Hymenoptera and Coleoptera.
