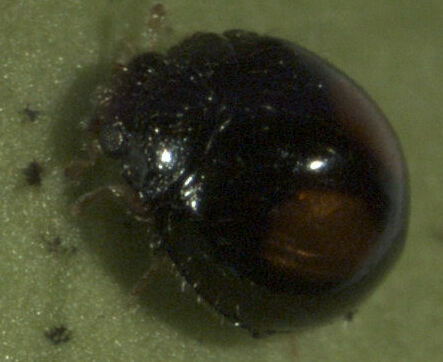
- Serangium maculigerum

Scientific classification
- Kingdom: Animalia
- Phylum: Arthropoda
- Clade: Pancrustacea
- Class: Insecta
- Order: Coleoptera
- Suborder: Polyphaga
- Infraorder: Cucujiformia
- Family: Coccinellidae
- Subfamily: Microweiseinae; Leng, 1920

Tribes
- Carinodulini; Microweiseini; Serangiini

= Microweiseinae =

Subfamily of beetles

The Microweiseinae are a subfamily of Coccinellidae, the lady beetles. Members of the Microweiseinae subfamily are often found to have their head curved down, closely held against their ventral side. In comparison to common garden coccinellids, ladybugs, the Microweiseinae lack the important bright markings that serve as warnings to potential predators.
