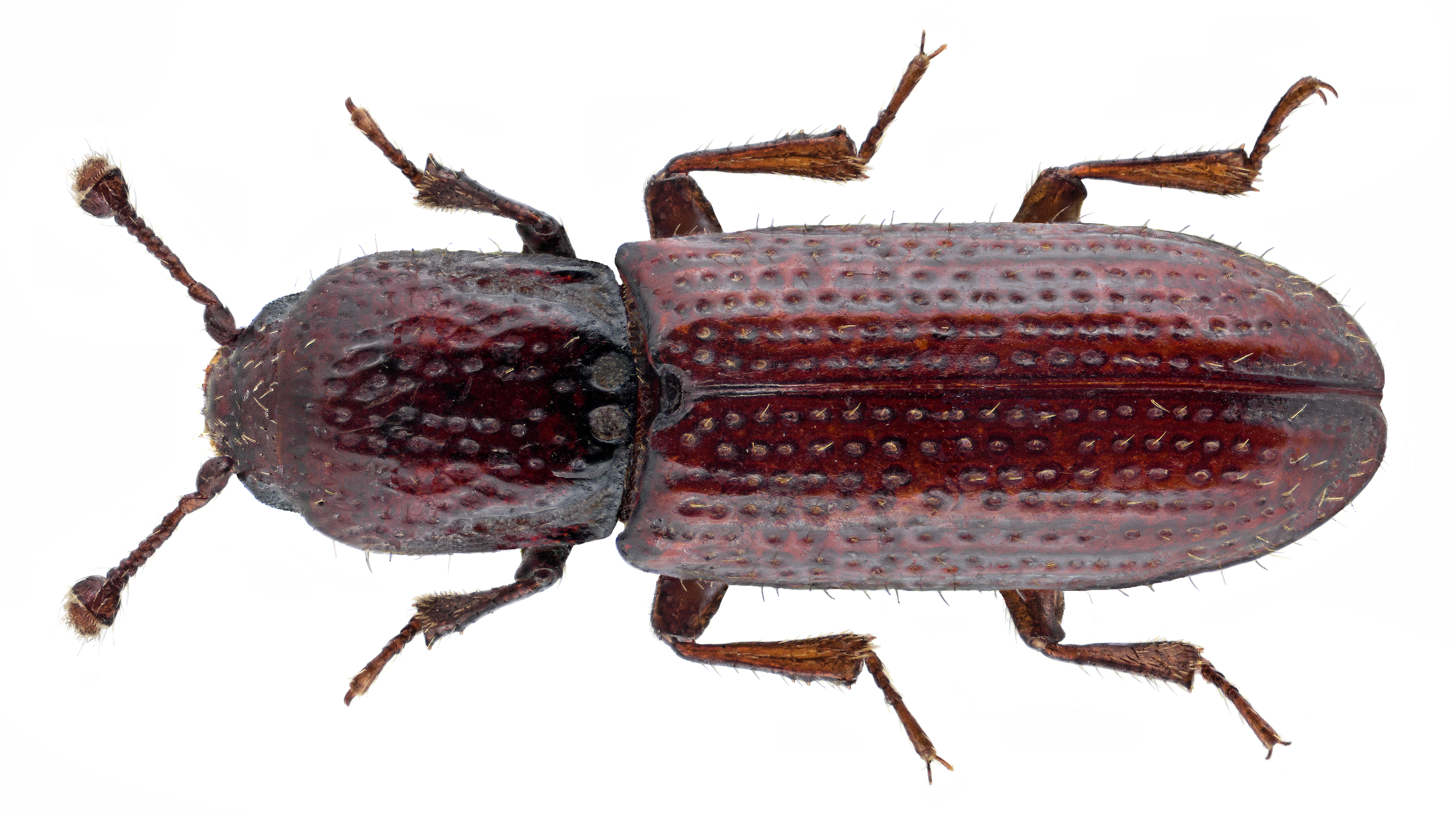
- Oxylaemus variolosus
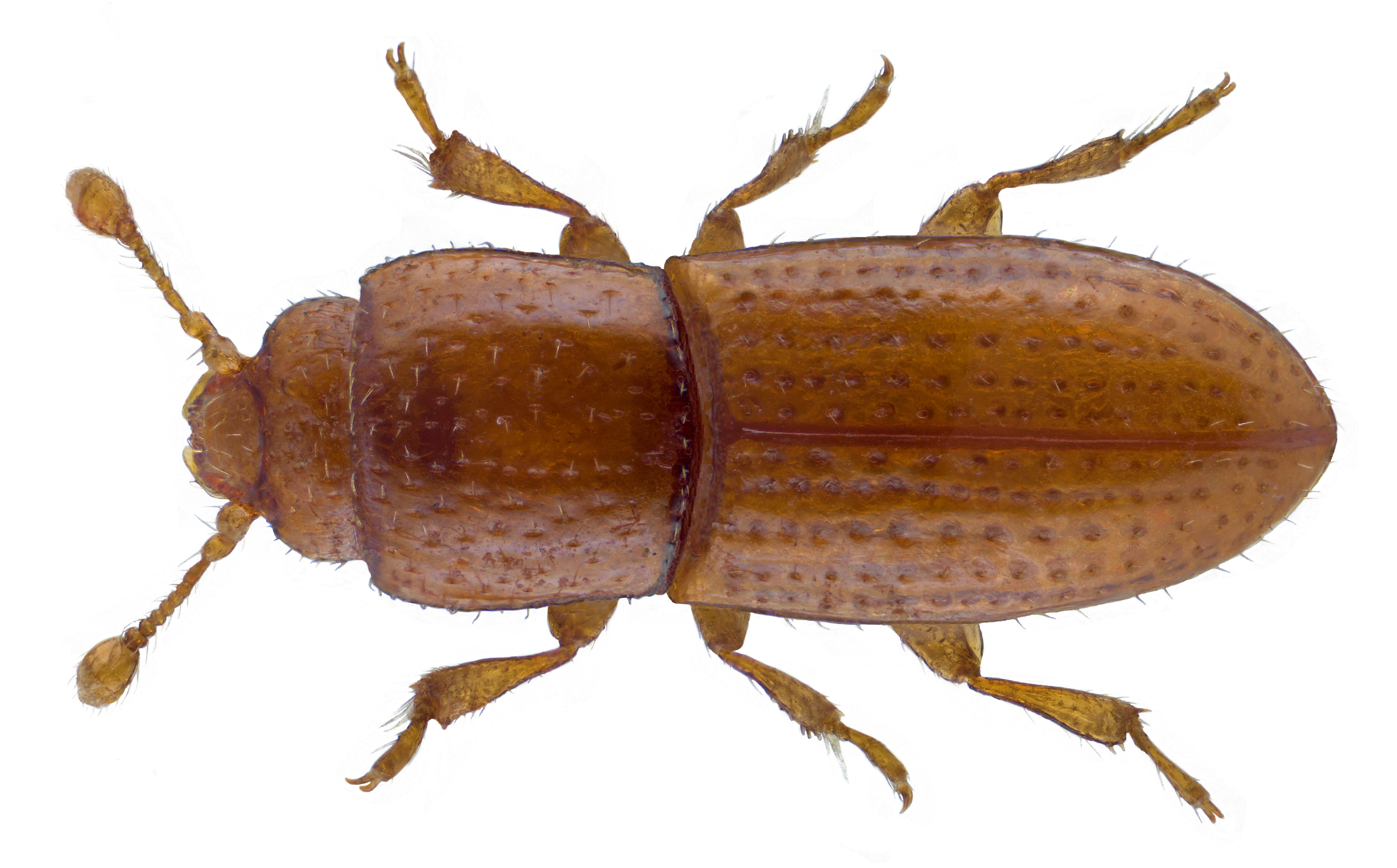
- Anommatus duodecimstriatus

Scientific classification
- Kingdom: Animalia
- Phylum: Arthropoda
- Clade: Pancrustacea
- Class: Insecta
- Order: Coleoptera
- Suborder: Polyphaga
- Infraorder: Cucujiformia
- Superfamily: Coccinelloidea
- Family: Teredidae; Seidlitz, 1888

Synonyms
- Anommatidae Ganglbauer, 1899

= Teredidae =

Teredidae Temporal range: Cenomanian–Recent

Family of beetles

Teredidae is a family of beetles in the superfamily Coccinelloidea, formerly included within the family Bothrideridae. There are around 160 species in 10 genera, found worldwide except South America. Teredids are generally found under bark, in the galleries of wood-boring beetles, or in leaf litter. They are thought to be fungivores. The oldest records of the family are Delteredolaemus from mid-Cretaceous aged Burmese amber from Myanmar and a species of Teredolaemus from Eocene aged Baltic amber.

== Genera ==
- Subfamily Teredinae
  - Tribe Sysolini
    - Sysolus Grouvelle, 1908
  - Tribe Sosylopsini
    - Sosylopsis Grouvelle, 1910
  - Tribe Teredini
    - Teredus Dejean, 1835
    - Oxylaemus Erichson, 1845
    - Teredomorphus Heinze, 1943
    - Rustleria Stephan, 1989
    - Teredolaemus Sharp, 1885
    - †Delteredolaemus Li, Huang & Cai, 2023
- Subfamily Anommatinae
  - Anommatus Wesmael, 1835
- Subfamily Xylariophilinae
  - Xylariophilus Pal & Lawrence, 1986
- Abromus Reitter, 1876
- Kocherius Coiffait, 1984
