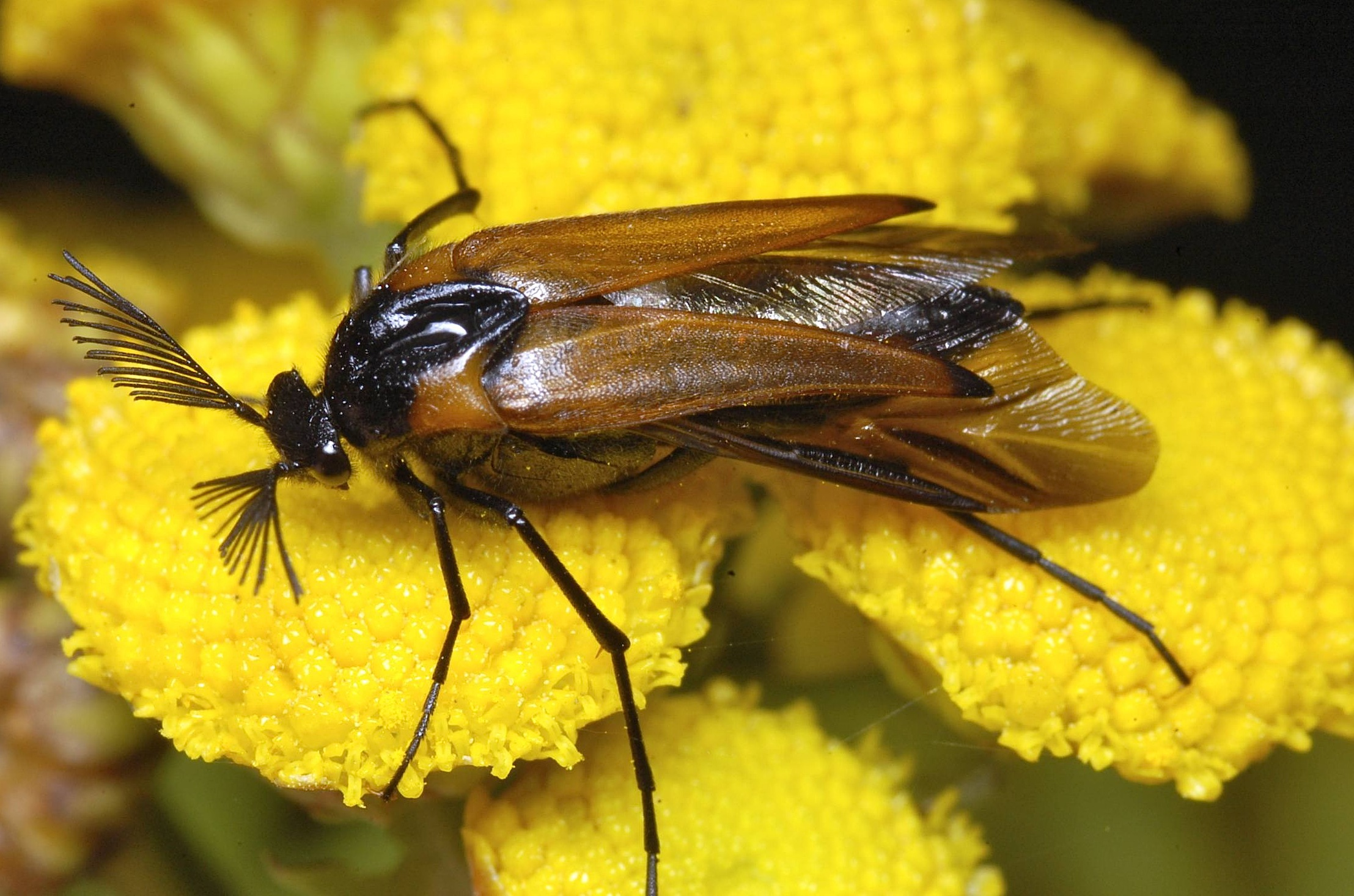

Scientific classification
- Kingdom: Animalia
- Phylum: Arthropoda
- Class: Insecta
- Order: Coleoptera
- Suborder: Polyphaga
- Infraorder: Cucujiformia
- Family: Ripiphoridae
- Genus: Metoecus
- Species: M. paradoxus

Binomial name
- Metoecus paradoxus (Linnaeus, 1761)

Synonyms
- Mordella paradoxa Linnaeus, 1761; Rhipiphorus paradoxus; Metoecus affinis Fischer von Waldheim, 1832; Metoecus atripennis Pic, 1916; Metoecus gradli Schilsky, 1901; Metoecus luteonotatus Pic, 1916; Metoecus multinotatus Pic, 1916; Metoecus nigrolineatus Pic, 1916; Metoecus theresae Pic, 1916; Metoecus trinotatus Pic, 1916; Metoecus viturati Pic, 1916; Mordella erythrogaster Froel, 1792

= Metoecus paradoxus =

Species of beetle

Metoecus paradoxus, also known as the wasp nest beetle and eyelash bug, is a species of Metoecus in the family Ripiphoridae.

== Description ==
M. paradoxus measures approximately 10 mm in length. It has a dark head and body and paler, orange-coloured pointed elytra that do not completely cover the abdomen. It has feathery antennae.

== Biology and lifecycle ==
M. paradoxus is primarily a parasitoid of Vespula vulgaris (the common wasp). Adult females lay eggs in decaying wood in autumn, which hatch in spring or summer. The first instar triungulin clings to a V. vulgaris worker to be transported to the nest. Once at the nest, the larva parasitises a wasp larva – once the larva has closed the cell, the M. paradoxus larva consumes the host and pupates in its place. Adults emerge from late July to early October. The development from larva to adult takes less than one month. Adult beetles live for between 6 and 12 days and probably do not feed.

== Chemical mechanisms ==
Parasites employ various mechanisms, including chemical mimicry and chemical camouflage, to mimic the host colony's odor. When the M. paradoxus beetle penetrates the V. vulgaris host, it is vital that it avoids being detected. The same goes for all parasitic social insect species. These beetles seem to avoid being detected by mimicking the cuticular hydrocarbon profile of their host, the common wasp. A study found that M. paradoxus shares around 91.1% of compounds with V. vulgaris.

== Pop culture ==
In 2020, American rapper Megan Thee Stallion created an Instagram post featuring a video in which Megan's friend asks what a bug on the wall is. Megan responds with, "bitch, an eyelash bug [sic]," and the two laugh. Megan then calls the bug's eyelashes (which are its antennae) "on fleek" and adds that it "just got [its] eyelashes done at the club." The bug then begins to fly, causing Megan and her friend to panic, and the video stops.

The video has since gone viral and has become an internet meme.

A second recording shows comments of people reacting to it and identifying it as M. paradoxus as Megan's friend shows her images of it, to which Megan replies, "Bitch, that is her. Look at them damn lashes! That is crazy." However, the bug in the video appears to be a male Pterotus obscuripennis, of the firefly family.
