= Trigonodera schaefferi =

Scientific classification
- Domain: Eukaryota
- Kingdom: Animalia
- Phylum: Arthropoda
- Class: Insecta
- Order: Coleoptera
- Suborder: Polyphaga
- Infraorder: Cucujiformia
- Family: Ripiphoridae
- Genus: Trigonodera
- Species: T. schaefferi

Binomial name
- Trigonodera schaefferi Rivnay, 1929

Species of beetle

Trigonodera schaefferi is a species of wedge-shaped beetle in the family Ripiphoridae. It is found in North America.
