= Macrosiagon sayi =

Scientific classification
- Domain: Eukaryota
- Kingdom: Animalia
- Phylum: Arthropoda
- Class: Insecta
- Order: Coleoptera
- Suborder: Polyphaga
- Infraorder: Cucujiformia
- Family: Ripiphoridae
- Genus: Macrosiagon
- Species: M. sayi

Binomial name
- Macrosiagon sayi (LeConte, 1858)

Species of beetle

Macrosiagon sayi is a species of wedge-shaped beetle in the family Ripiphoridae. It is found in North America.
