= Ripiphorus schwarzi =

Scientific classification
- Kingdom: Animalia
- Phylum: Arthropoda
- Class: Insecta
- Order: Coleoptera
- Suborder: Polyphaga
- Infraorder: Cucujiformia
- Family: Ripiphoridae
- Genus: Ripiphorus
- Species: R. schwarzi

Binomial name
- Ripiphorus schwarzi (LeConte, 1880)

Species of beetle

Ripiphorus schwarzi is a species of wedge-shaped beetle in the family Ripiphoridae. It is found in North America.
