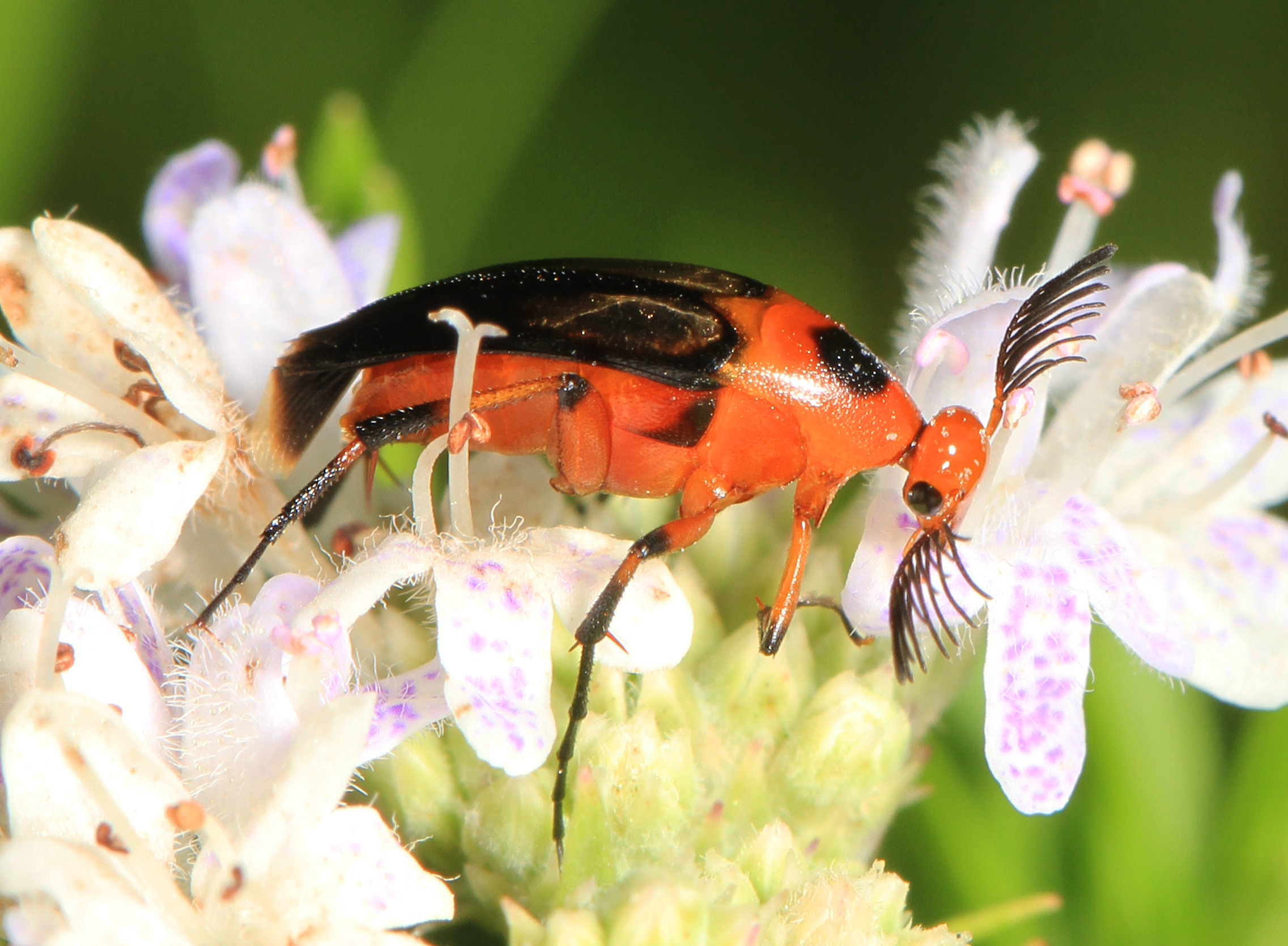

Scientific classification
- Kingdom: Animalia
- Phylum: Arthropoda
- Class: Insecta
- Order: Coleoptera
- Suborder: Polyphaga
- Infraorder: Cucujiformia
- Family: Ripiphoridae
- Genus: Macrosiagon
- Species: M. limbata

Binomial name
- Macrosiagon limbata (Fabricius, 1792)

= Macrosiagon limbata =

Species of beetle

Macrosiagon limbata is a species of wedge-shaped beetle in the family Ripiphoridae. They are found across the Eastern United States, Southeastern Canada and Central America. It is likely that their range extends into South America but this currently remains unknown.

Macrosiagon limbata was first discovered in 1781 by the famous zoologist Johan Christian Fabricius. Coleopterans in the genus Macrosiagon are internal parasites of other insects at some point during their lifecycle. They go through a form of hypermetamorphosis, in which the larva goes through multiple stages of morphologically distinct instars. The female deposits eggs on flowers visited by bees and other hymenopterans. Larva of Macrosiagon limbata have been reported as parasites of the wasp family Crabronidae. The first larval instar is a planidum, an active larva that can climb on a host hymenopteran. They are then transported to the host's nest, where they act as parasitoids. The following instars don't have legs, and feed on larvae or stored pollen and nectar supplies.

Adult Macrosiagon limbata are active in summer and can be found on flowers such as elderberries and goldenrod. They have prolonged mouthparts thought to be used for sucking nectar. Males have comblike antennae while female antennae are serrate. The elytra are longer than the abdomen and diverge at the apex.

== Related Species ==
There are more than 150 described species in the genus Macrosiagon. They are distinguished from other Ripiphorids by the insertion of the antennae anterior to the eyes. Microsiagon limbatas are often confused with tumbling flower beetles (Mordellidae) but differ in length of elytra. They are also similar in appearance to false darkling beetles (Melandryidae).

== Collecting Notes ==
Beetles in the Ripiphoridae family are often difficult to collect. They have very short flight periods and can move swiftly. Marcosiagon limbata prefer open fields with wildflowers. Sweep-netting on flowers and low vegetation during summer months is the best method for capturing these beetles. Catching adults by hand is difficult.

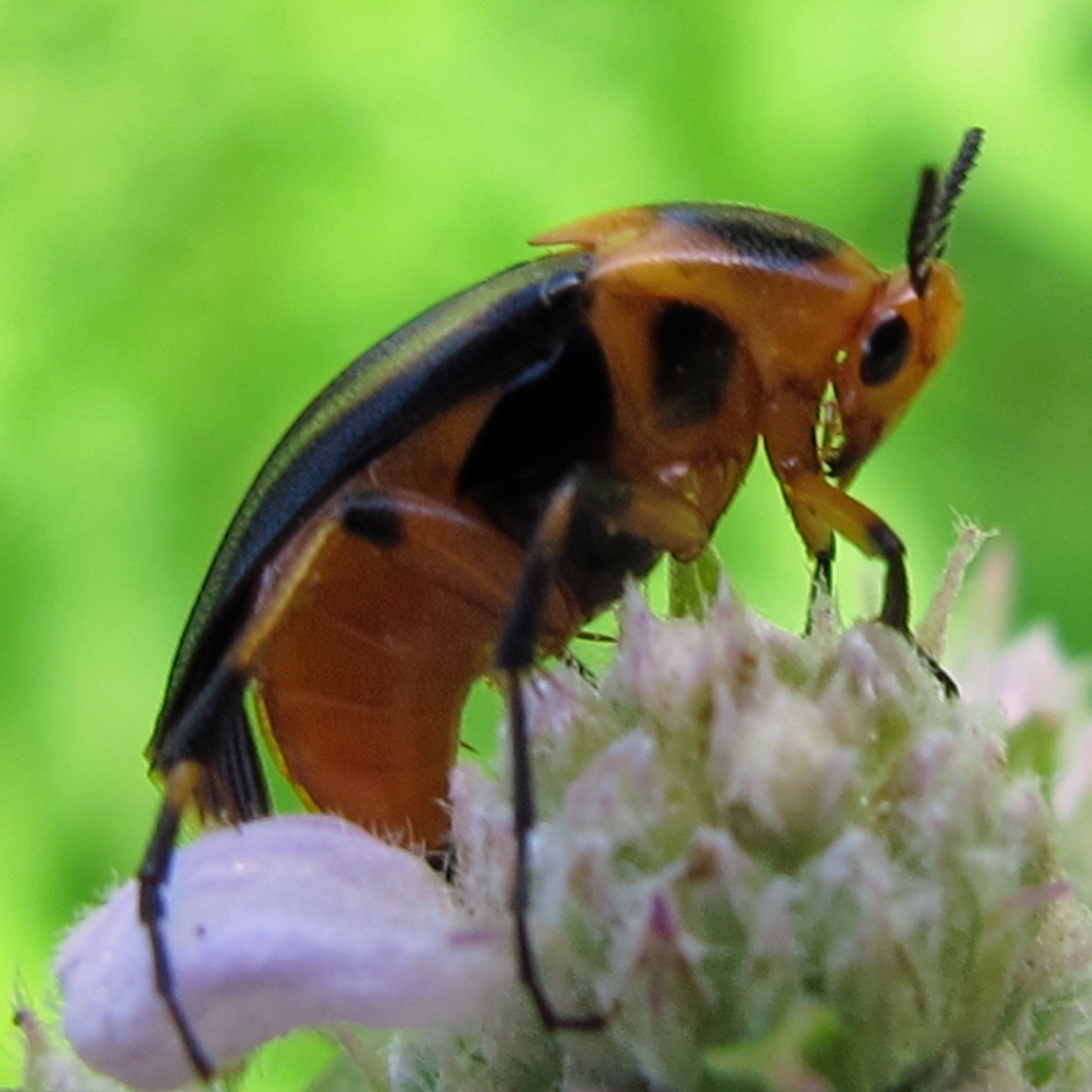
Female

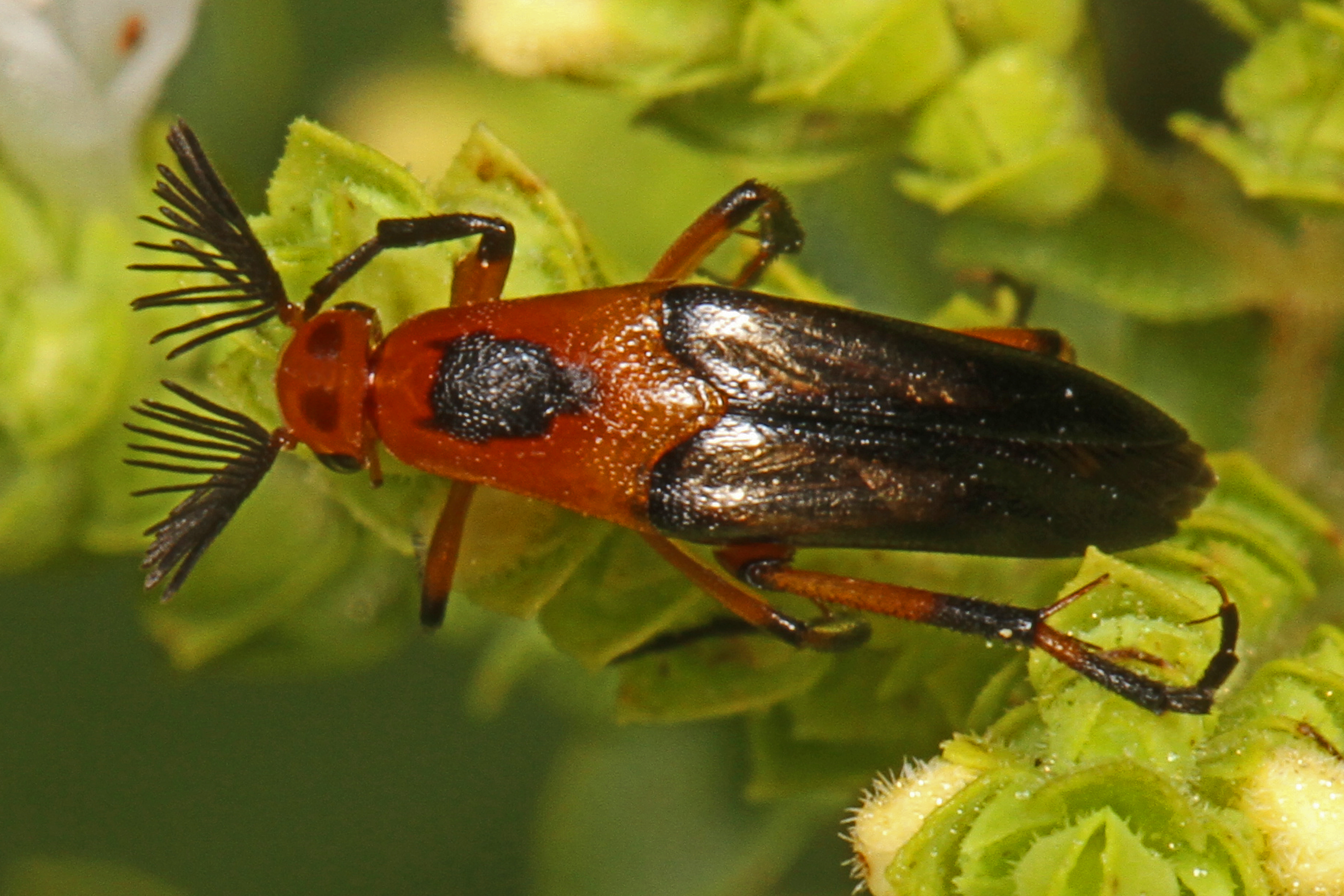
Male
