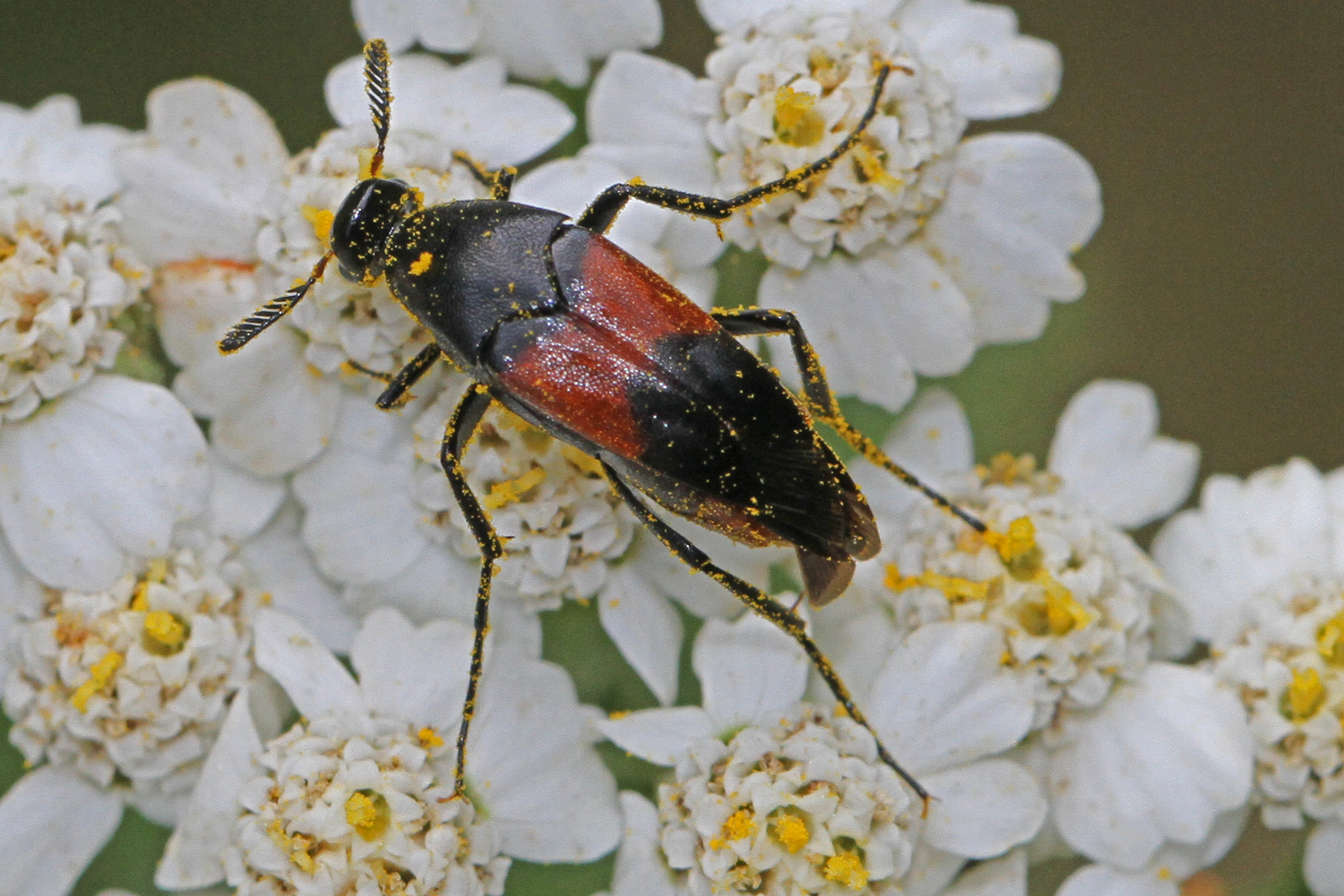

Scientific classification
- Domain: Eukaryota
- Kingdom: Animalia
- Phylum: Arthropoda
- Class: Insecta
- Order: Coleoptera
- Suborder: Polyphaga
- Infraorder: Cucujiformia
- Family: Ripiphoridae
- Genus: Macrosiagon
- Species: M. pectinata

Binomial name
- Macrosiagon pectinata (Fabricius, 1775)

= Macrosiagon pectinata =

Species of beetle

Macrosiagon pectinata is a species of wedge-shaped beetle in the family Ripiphoridae. It is found in Central America and North America.
