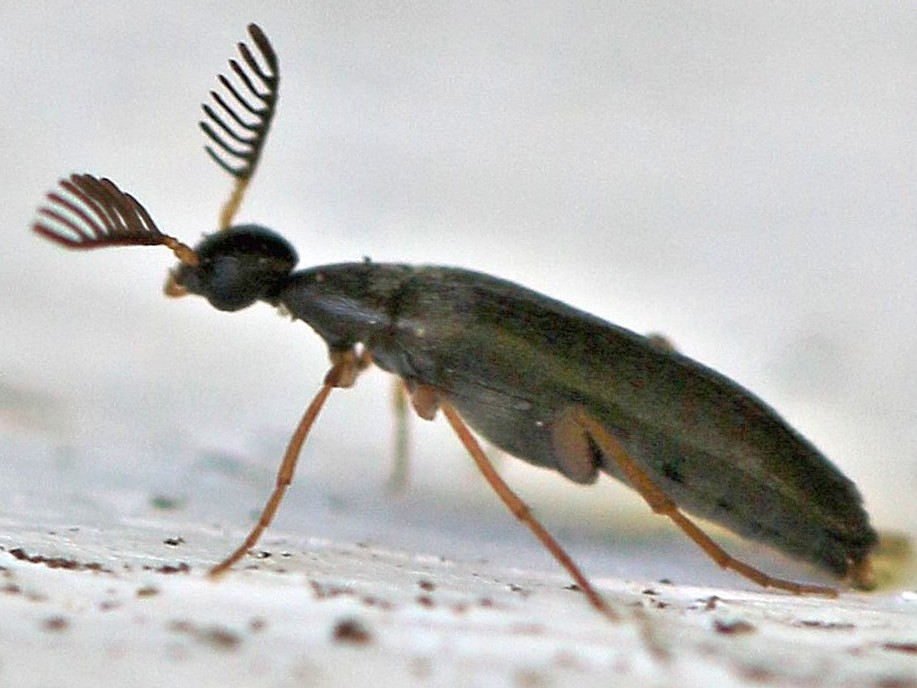

Scientific classification
- Kingdom: Animalia
- Phylum: Arthropoda
- Clade: Pancrustacea
- Class: Insecta
- Order: Coleoptera
- Suborder: Polyphaga
- Infraorder: Cucujiformia
- Family: Ripiphoridae
- Genus: Pelecotoma
- Species: P. flavipes

Binomial name
- Pelecotoma flavipes Melsheimer, 1846

= Pelecotoma flavipes =

Species of beetle

Pelecotoma flavipes is a species of wedge-shaped beetle in the family Ripiphoridae. It is found in North America.
