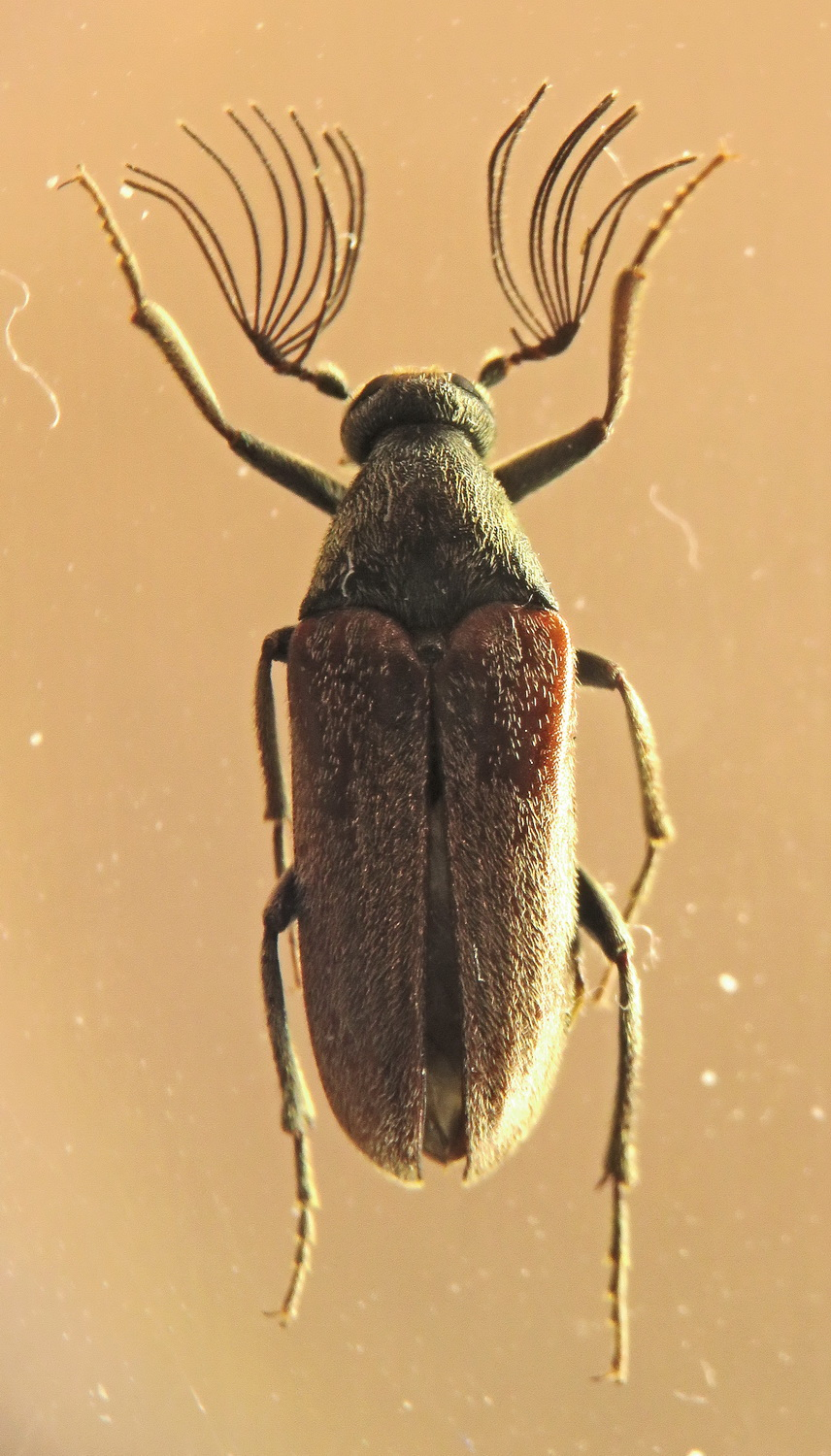

Scientific classification
- Domain: Eukaryota
- Kingdom: Animalia
- Phylum: Arthropoda
- Class: Insecta
- Order: Coleoptera
- Suborder: Polyphaga
- Infraorder: Cucujiformia
- Family: Ripiphoridae
- Genus: Ptilophorus
- Species: P. wrightii

Binomial name
- Ptilophorus wrightii (LeConte, 1868)

Synonyms
- Toposcopus wrightii LeConte, 1868

= Ptilophorus wrightii =

Species of beetle

Ptilophorus wrightii is a species of wedge-shaped beetle in the family Ripiphoridae. It is found in North America.
