= Ripiphorus sexdens =

Scientific classification
- Domain: Eukaryota
- Kingdom: Animalia
- Phylum: Arthropoda
- Class: Insecta
- Order: Coleoptera
- Suborder: Polyphaga
- Infraorder: Cucujiformia
- Family: Ripiphoridae
- Genus: Ripiphorus
- Species: R. sexdens

Binomial name
- Ripiphorus sexdens Linsley & MacSwain, 1950

Synonyms
- Rhipiphorus sexdens Linsley and MacSwain, 1950

Species of beetle

Ripiphorus sexdens is a species of wedge-shaped beetle in the family Ripiphoridae. It is found in North America.
