= Pelecotoides luteus =

Scientific classification
- Kingdom: Animalia
- Phylum: Arthropoda
- Clade: Pancrustacea
- Class: Insecta
- Order: Coleoptera
- Suborder: Polyphaga
- Infraorder: Cucujiformia
- Family: Ripiphoridae
- Genus: Pelecotoides
- Species: P. luteus

Binomial name
- Pelecotoides luteus

Species of beetle

Pelecotoides luteus is a species of beetle.
