= Pelecotoides =

Scientific classification
- Kingdom: Animalia
- Phylum: Arthropoda
- Clade: Pancrustacea
- Class: Insecta
- Order: Coleoptera
- Suborder: Polyphaga
- Infraorder: Cucujiformia
- Family: Ripiphoridae
- Subfamily: Ptilophorinae
- Genus: Pelecotoides

Genus of beetles

Pelecotoides is a genus of beetles in the family Ripiphoridae.

== Taxonomy ==
Pelecotoides contains the following species:

- Pelecotoides nudus
- Pelecotoides schaefferi
- Pelecotoides tokejii
- Pelecotoides helva
- Pelecotoides lutea
- Pelecotoides senilis
- Pelecotoides hackeri
- Pelecotoides serraticornis
- Pelecotoides nigrolateralis
- Pelecotoides impressithorax
- Pelecotoides bivittatus
- Pelecotoides luteus
- Pelecotoides malaccanus
- Pelecotoides nubilus
- Pelecotoides sericeus
- Pelecotoides subparallelus
- Pelecotoides helvus
- Pelecotoides aureotincta
- Pelecotoides aureotinctus
- Pelecotoides bivittata
- Pelecotoides lineata
- Pelecotoides nubila
- Pelecotoides sericea
- Pelecotoides nebulosus
- Pelecotoides nebulosa
- Pelecotoides subparallela
- Pelecotoides lineatus
- Pelecotoides malaccana
- Pelecotoides signaticollis
- Pelecotoides sinicus
- Pelecotoides suturalis
- Pelecotoides succinctus
- Pelecotoides boliviensis
- Pelecotoides conicollis
- Pelecotoides marmoratus
- Pelecotoides mastersii
