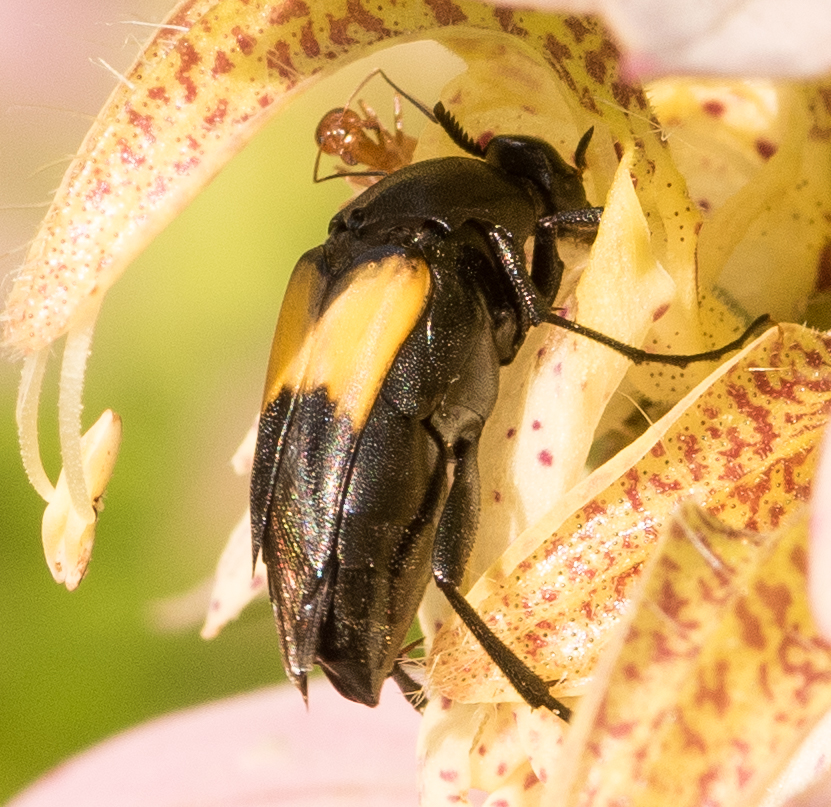

Scientific classification
- Kingdom: Animalia
- Phylum: Arthropoda
- Clade: Pancrustacea
- Class: Insecta
- Order: Coleoptera
- Suborder: Polyphaga
- Infraorder: Cucujiformia
- Family: Ripiphoridae
- Genus: Macrosiagon
- Species: M. dimidiata

Binomial name
- Macrosiagon dimidiata (Fabricius, 1781)

= Macrosiagon dimidiata =

Species of beetle

Macrosiagon dimidiata is a species of wedge-shaped beetle in the family Ripiphoridae. It is found in North America.

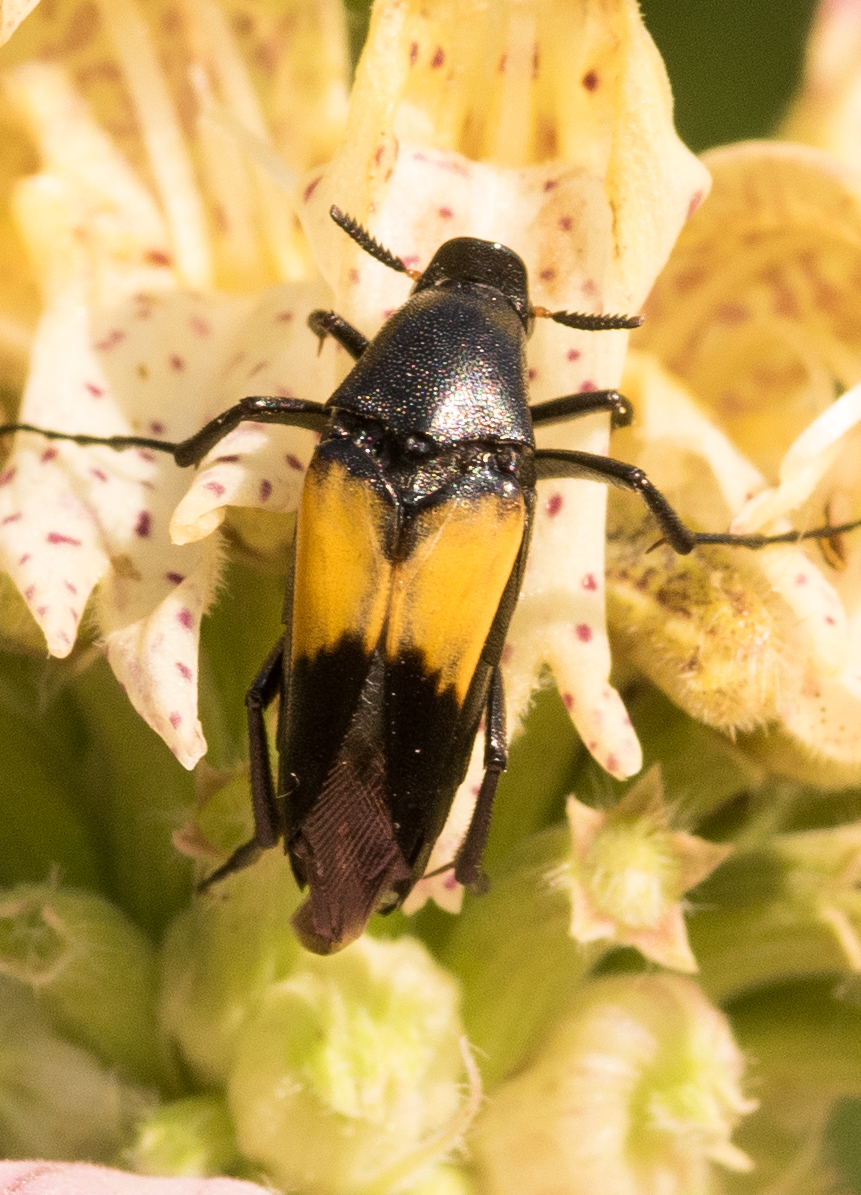
