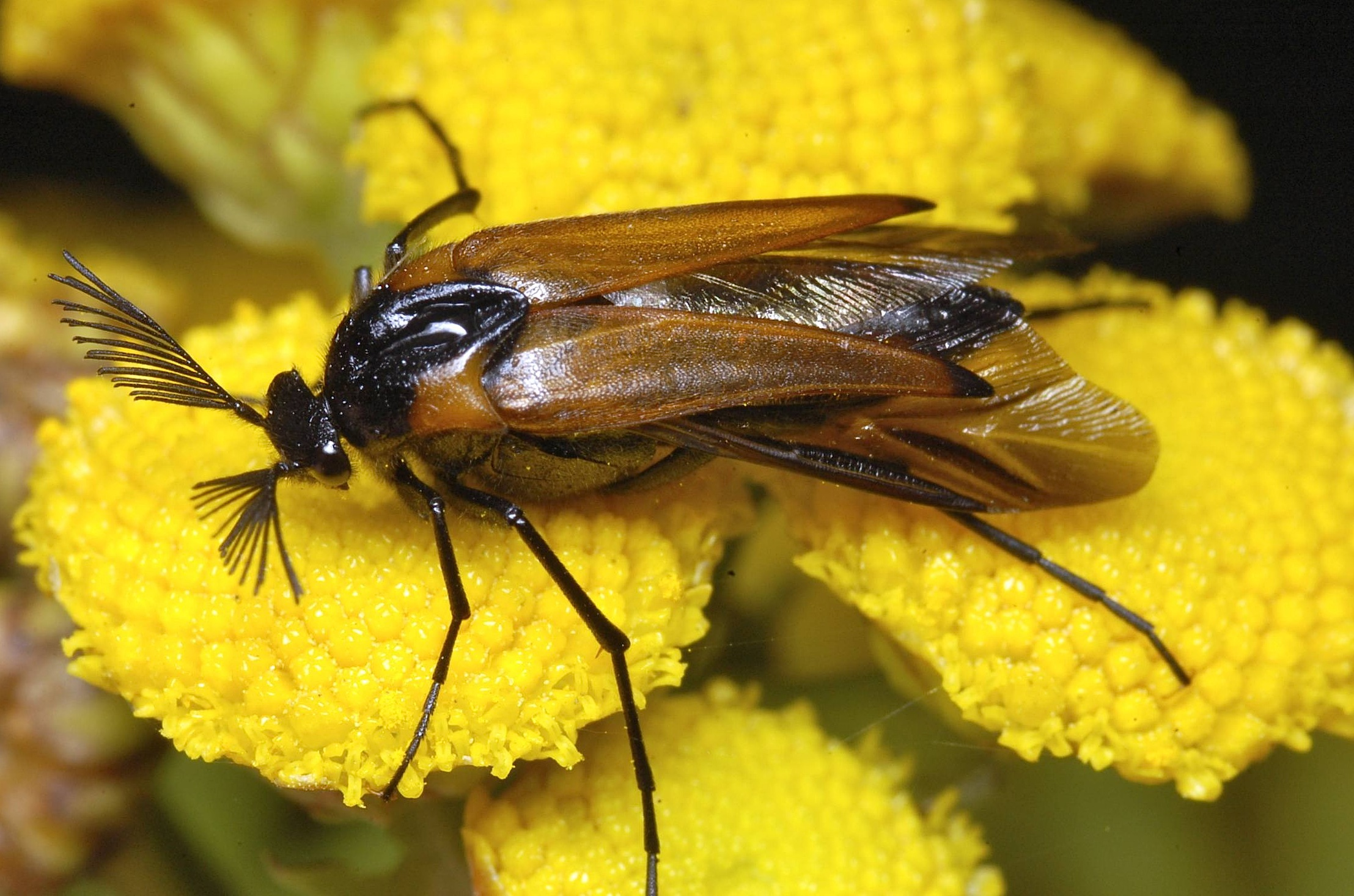
- Metoecus paradoxus

Scientific classification
- Kingdom: Animalia
- Phylum: Arthropoda
- Class: Insecta
- Order: Coleoptera
- Suborder: Polyphaga
- Infraorder: Cucujiformia
- Family: Ripiphoridae
- Subfamily: Ripiphorinae
- Tribe: Macrosiagonini
- Genus: Metoecus; Dejean, 1834

Synonyms
- Ripidastes Gistl, 1848; Cyttaroecus Schilder, 1923

= Metoecus =

Genus of beetles

Metoecus is a genus of wedge-shaped beetles in the family Ripiphoridae. There are at least five described species in Metoecus.

== Species ==
These five species belong to the genus Metoecus:

- Metoecus javanus (Pic, 1913)
- Metoecus morawitzi
- Metoecus paradoxus (Linnaeus, 1761)
- Metoecus satanus (Schilder, 1924)
- Metoecus vespae (Kôno, 1927)
