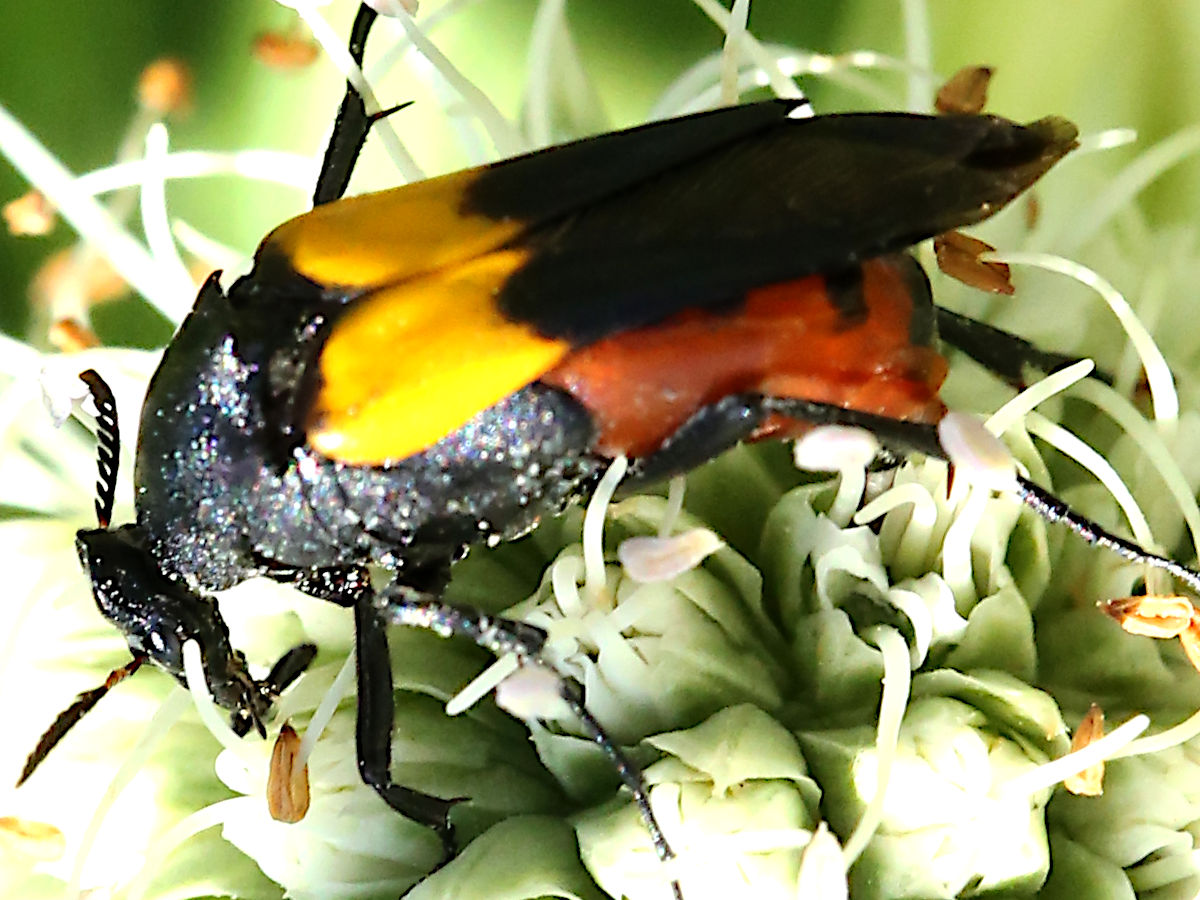

Scientific classification
- Domain: Eukaryota
- Kingdom: Animalia
- Phylum: Arthropoda
- Class: Insecta
- Order: Coleoptera
- Suborder: Polyphaga
- Infraorder: Cucujiformia
- Family: Ripiphoridae
- Genus: Macrosiagon
- Species: M. flavipennis

Binomial name
- Macrosiagon flavipennis (LeConte, 1866)

= Macrosiagon flavipennis =

Species of beetle

Macrosiagon flavipennis is a species of wedge-shaped beetle in the family Ripiphoridae. It is found in Central America and North America.
