= Pelecotoides conicollis =

Scientific classification
- Kingdom: Animalia
- Phylum: Arthropoda
- Class: Insecta
- Order: Coleoptera
- Suborder: Polyphaga
- Infraorder: Cucujiformia
- Family: Ripiphoridae
- Genus: Pelecotoides
- Species: P. conicollis

Binomial name
- Pelecotoides conicollis Castelnau, 1840

Species of beetle

Pelecotoides conicollis is a species of beetle, commonly found in Australia.

== Description and identification ==
The body is around 22.5 mm long, and 9 mm wide, coloured a light chestnut brown. The antennae are brown, with multiple small protrusions at each end, like a small comb.
