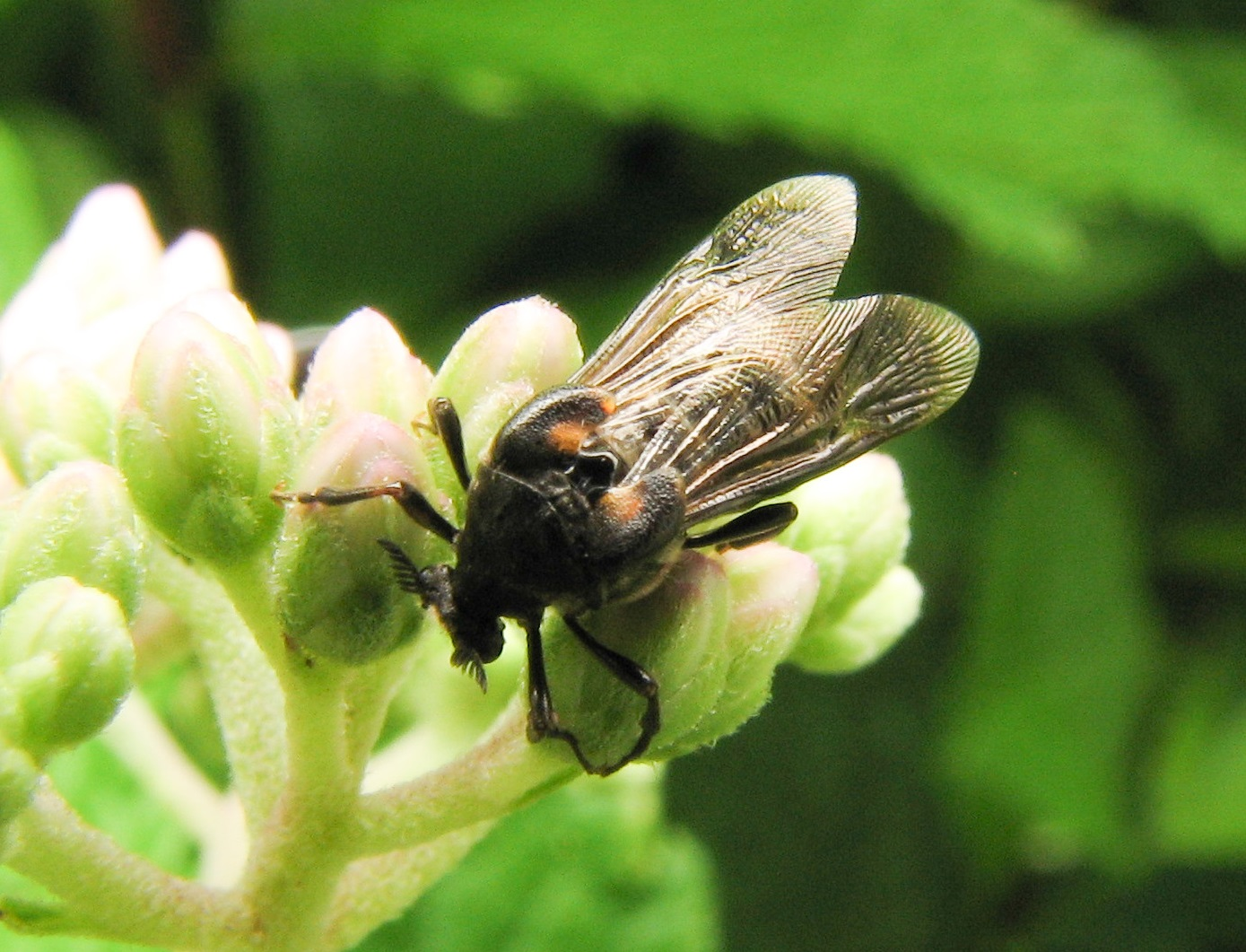

Scientific classification
- Domain: Eukaryota
- Kingdom: Animalia
- Phylum: Arthropoda
- Class: Insecta
- Order: Coleoptera
- Suborder: Polyphaga
- Infraorder: Cucujiformia
- Family: Ripiphoridae
- Genus: Ripiphorus
- Species: R. fasciatus

Binomial name
- Ripiphorus fasciatus Say, 1823

= Ripiphorus fasciatus =

Species of wedge-shaped beetle

Ripiphorus fasciatus is a species of wedge-shaped beetle with parasitoid larvae. R. fasciatus likely parasitizes Halictid bees; all Ripiphorus parasitize ground-nesting bees.

== Description ==
R. fasciatus has clear hindwings, plumose antenna, and superficially resembles a bee or fly.

== Range ==
This species has been documented in the northeastern United States and Eastern Canada.
