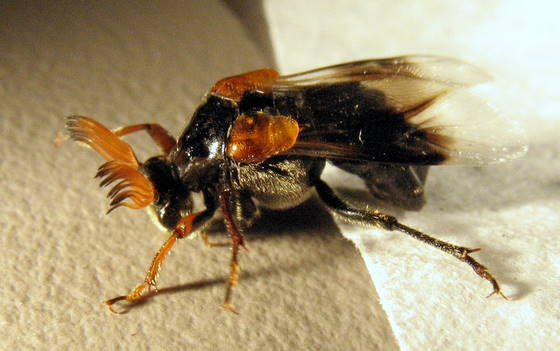

Scientific classification
- Domain: Eukaryota
- Kingdom: Animalia
- Phylum: Arthropoda
- Class: Insecta
- Order: Coleoptera
- Suborder: Polyphaga
- Infraorder: Cucujiformia
- Family: Ripiphoridae
- Genus: Ripiphorus
- Species: R. diadasiae

Binomial name
- Ripiphorus diadasiae Linsley & MacSwain, 1950

Synonyms
- Rhipiphorus diadasiae Linsley and MacSwain, 1950

= Ripiphorus diadasiae =

Species of beetle

Ripiphorus diadasiae is a species of wedge-shaped beetle in the family Ripiphoridae. It is found in North America.
