= Ptilophorinae =

Scientific classification
- Kingdom: Animalia
- Phylum: Arthropoda
- Clade: Pancrustacea
- Class: Insecta
- Order: Coleoptera
- Suborder: Polyphaga
- Infraorder: Cucujiformia
- Family: Ripiphoridae
- Subfamily: Ptilophorinae; Gerstaecker, 1855

Subfamily of beetles

Ptilophorinae is an insect subfamily within the family Ripiphoridae, also called the wedge-shaped beetles.

== Taxonomy ==
Ptilophorinae contains the following genera:

- Micropelecotoides
- Euctenia
- Geoscopus
- Ptilophorus
- Pelecotoides
