= Elytron =

Hardened insect forewing

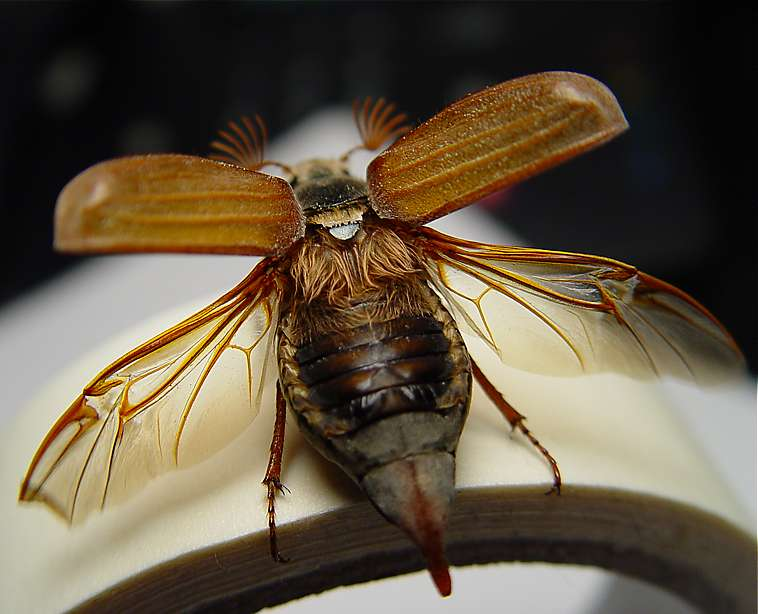
The elytra of this cockchafer beetle are readily distinguished from the transparent hindwings.

An elytron (/ˈɛlɪtrɒn/; from Ancient Greek ἔλυτρον (élutron) 'sheath, cover'; pl.: elytra, /ˈɛlɪtrə/) is a modified, hardened forewing of beetles (Coleoptera), though a few of the true bugs (Hemiptera) such as the family Schizopteridae are extremely similar; in true bugs, the forewings are called hemelytra (sometimes alternatively spelled as "hemielytra"), and in most species only the basal half is thickened while the apex is membranous, but when they are entirely thickened the condition is referred to as "coleopteroid". An elytron is sometimes also referred to as a shard.

== Description ==
Ladybug in flight with elytra extended

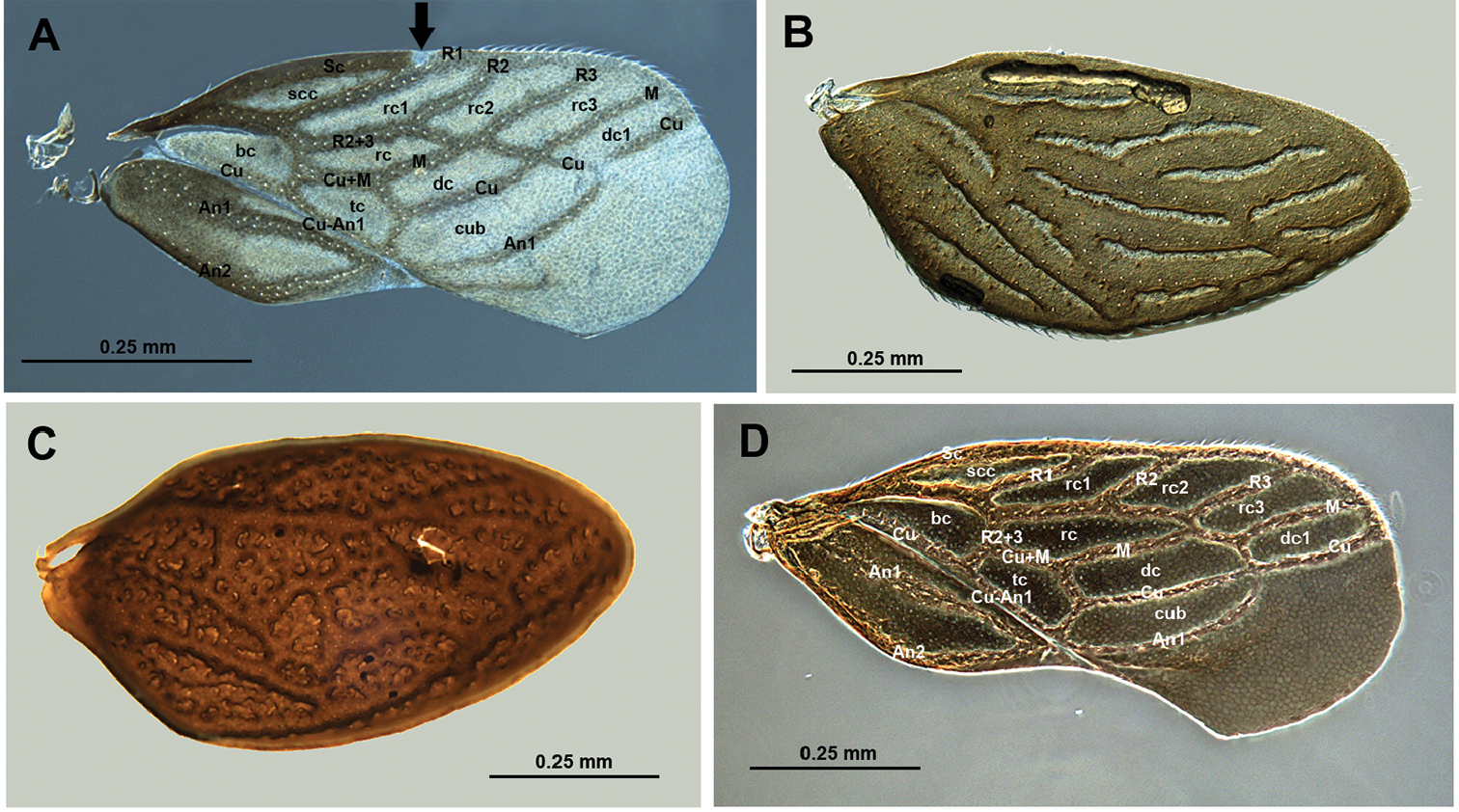
Hemelytra in Schizopteridae; figures B and C are considered "coleopteroid" as they lack membrane.

The elytra primarily serve as protective wing-cases for the hindwings underneath, which are used for flying. To fly, a beetle typically opens the elytra and then extends the hindwings, flying while still holding the elytra open, though many beetles in the families Scarabaeidae and Buprestidae can fly with the elytra closed (e.g., most Cetoniinae).

In a number of groups, the elytra are reduced to various degrees, (e.g., the beetle families Staphylinidae and Ripiphoridae), or secondarily lost altogether, as in various Elateroidea lineages with wingless females.

In some flightless groups, the elytra are present but fused together, and the hindwings are absent (e.g., some ground beetles (Carabidae), scarab beetles, and weevils).

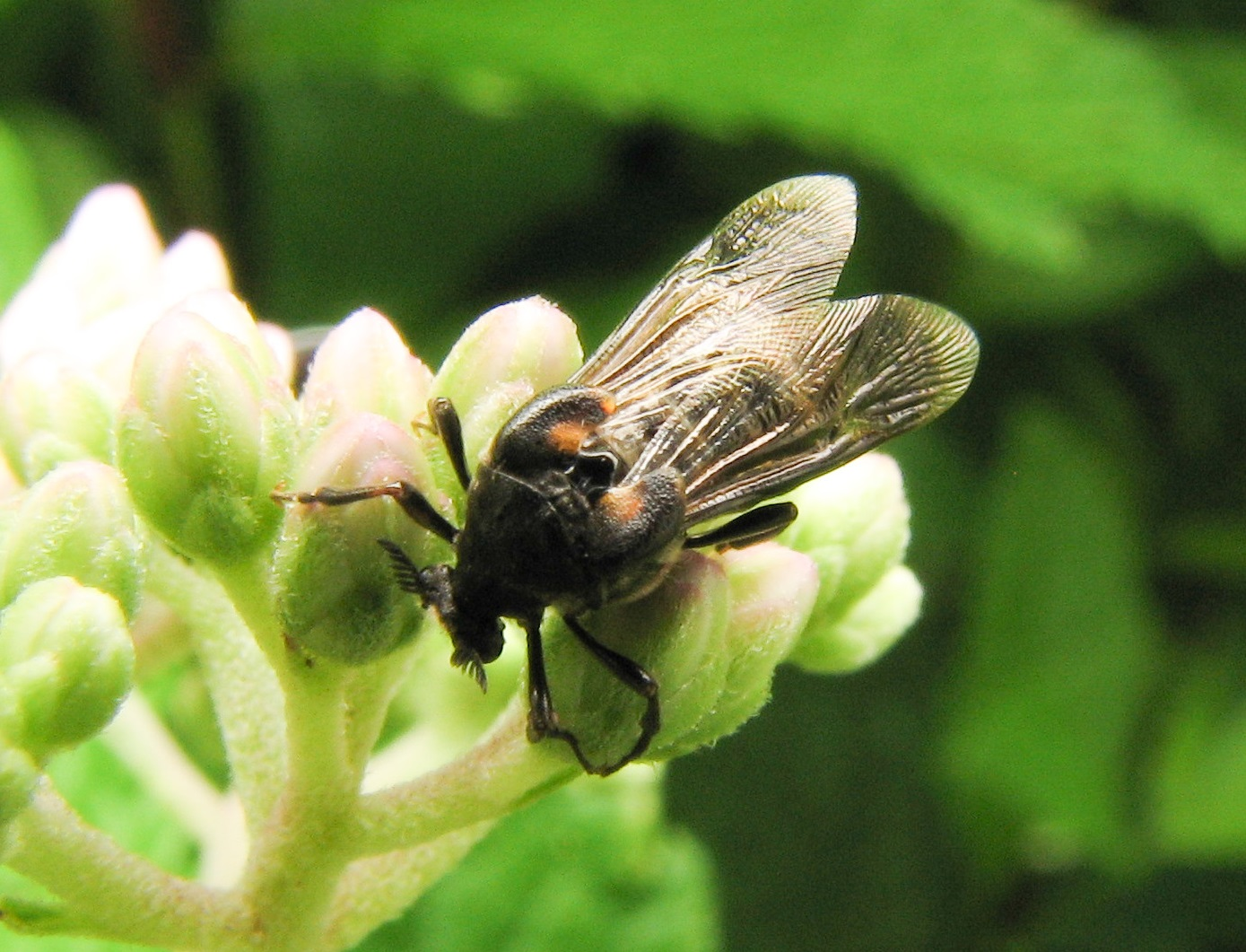
Ripiphorus fasciatus-complex (female) has reduced-size elytra

Cetonia aurata flying with elytra closed

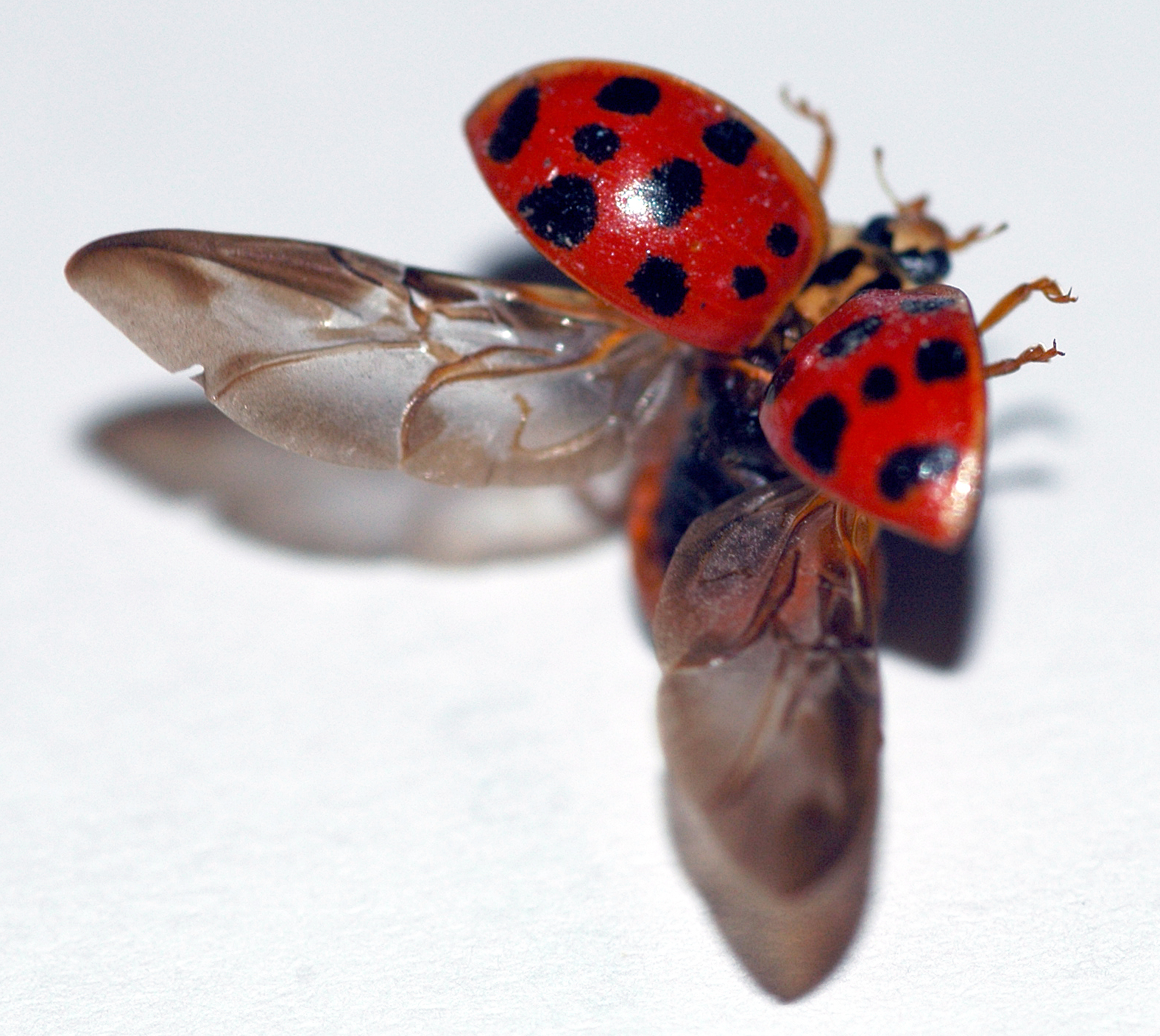
Ladybug preparing to fly, with elytra and wings extended

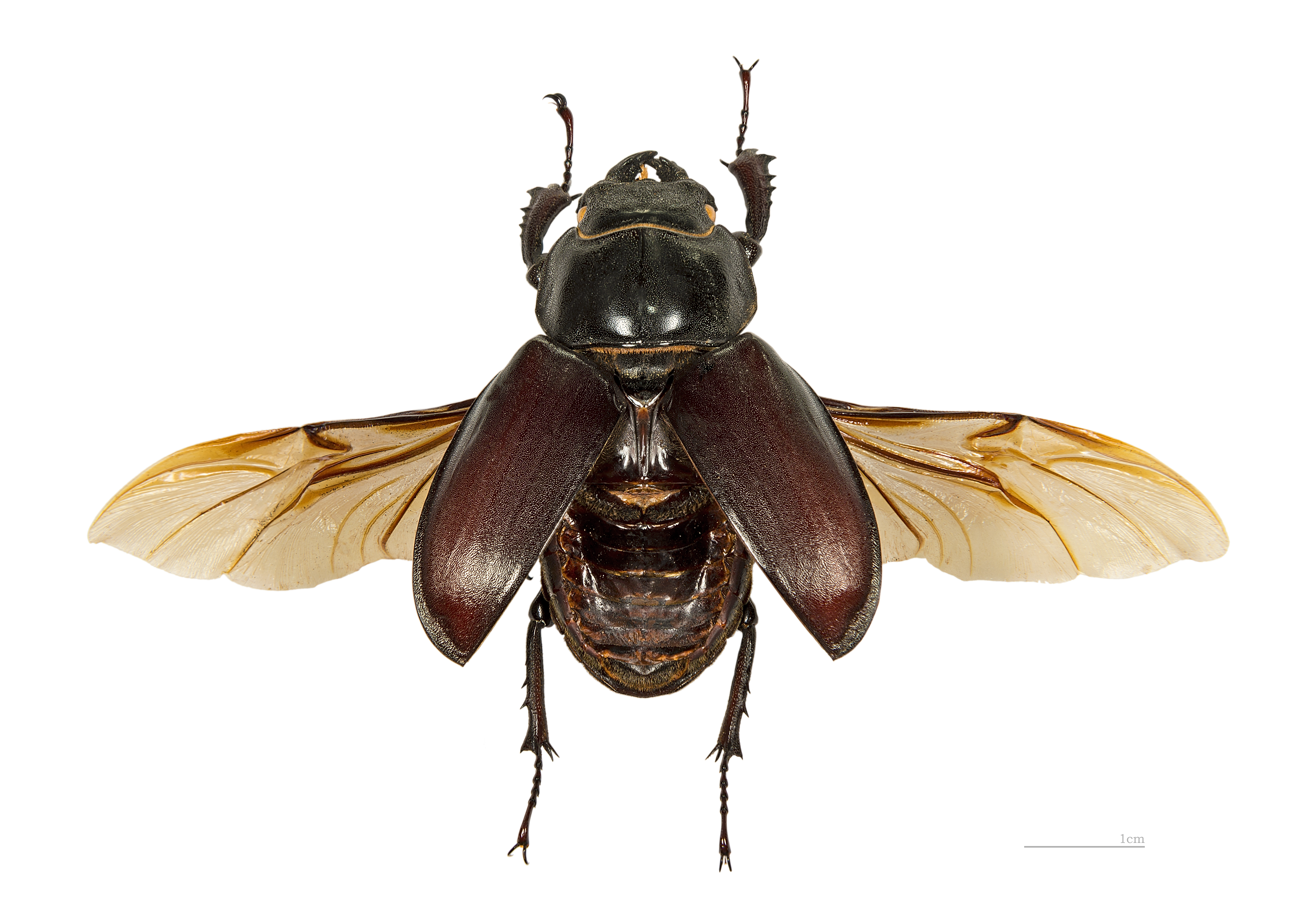
Stag beetle with elytra and wings extended

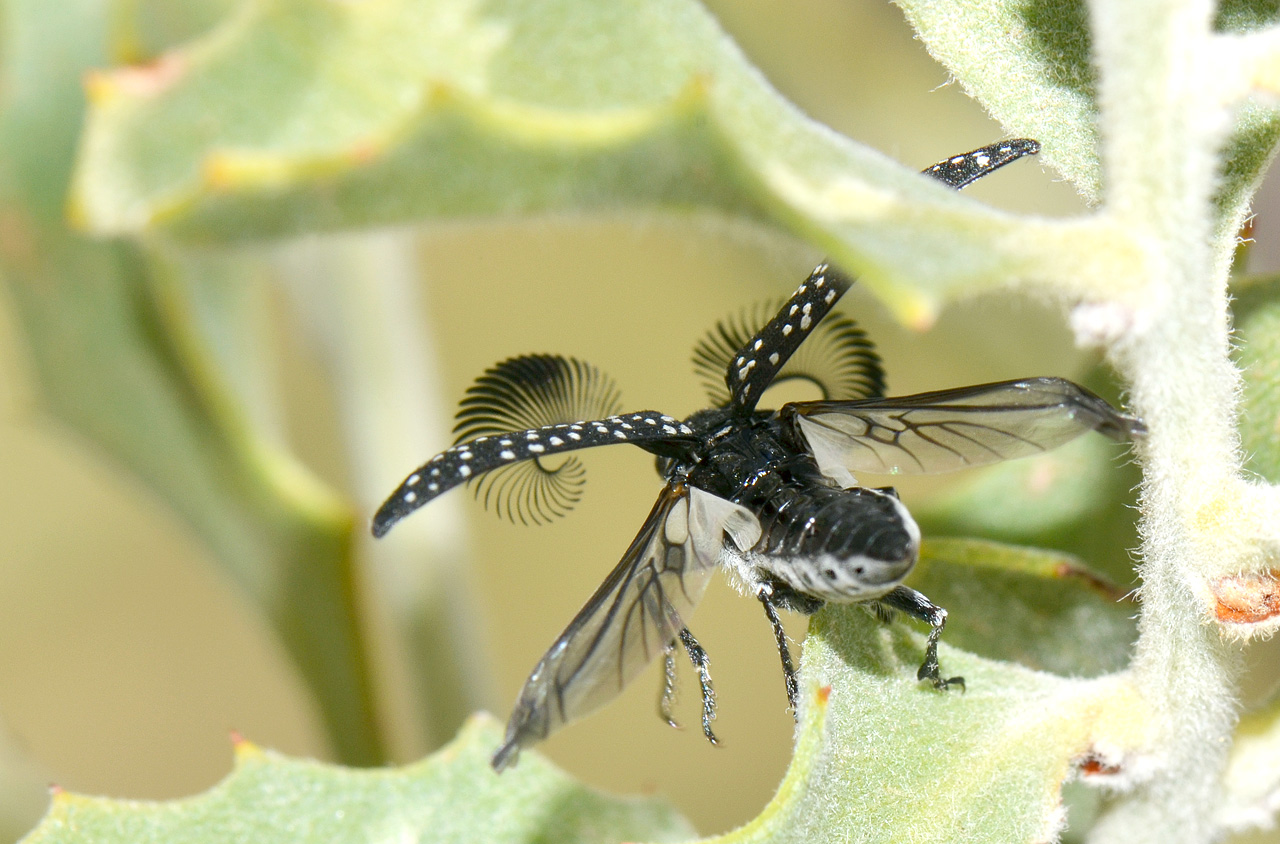
Rhipicera carinata taking flight

== In popular culture ==
The video game Minecraft features elytra as an item that allows the player to glide in a similar fashion to a hang glider.
