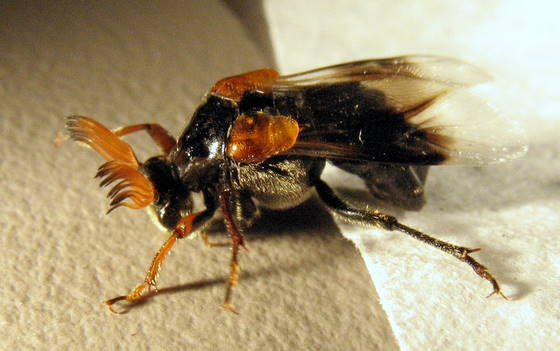
- Ripiphorus diadasiae

Scientific classification
- Kingdom: Animalia
- Phylum: Arthropoda
- Clade: Pancrustacea
- Class: Insecta
- Order: Coleoptera
- Suborder: Polyphaga
- Infraorder: Cucujiformia
- Family: Ripiphoridae
- Subfamily: Ripiphorinae
- Genus: Ripiphorus; Bosc, 1791

= Ripiphorus =

Genus of beetles

Ripiphorus is a genus of wedge-shaped beetles in the family Ripiphoridae. There are at least 30 described species in Ripiphorus.

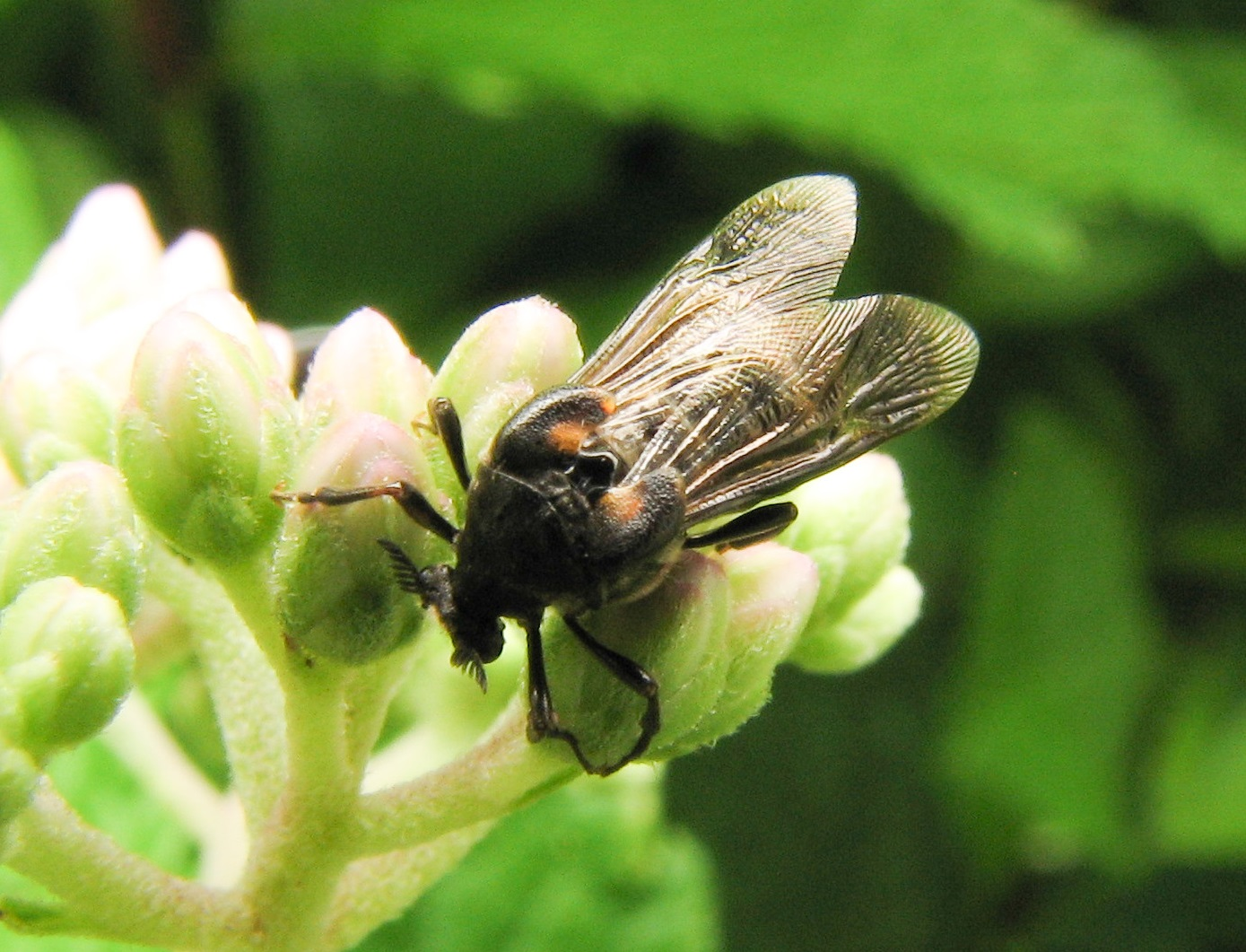
Ripiphorus fasciatus-complex, female

== Species ==
These 34 species belong to the genus Ripiphorus:

- Ripiphorus aurantus Rivnay, 1929^{i c g}
- Ripiphorus blaisdelli Linsley and MacSwain, 1950^{i c g}
- Ripiphorus caboverdianus^{g}
- Ripiphorus californicus (LeConte, 1880)^{i c g}
- Ripiphorus calopterus Rivnay, 1929^{i c g}
- Ripiphorus columbianus Brown, 1930^{i c g}
- Ripiphorus dammersi Barber, 1939^{i c g}
- Ripiphorus diadasiae Linsley & MacSwain, 1950^{i c g b}
- Ripiphorus epinomiae Linsley & MacSwain, 1950^{i c g b}
- Ripiphorus eremicola Linsley and MacSwain, 1950^{i c g}
- Ripiphorus fasciatus (Say, 1823)^{i c g}
- Ripiphorus flavicornis (Say, 1823)^{i c g}
- Ripiphorus iridescens Rivnay, 1929^{i c g}
- Ripiphorus luteipennis LeConte, 1865^{i c g}
- Ripiphorus minimus (Pierce, 1904)^{i c g}
- Ripiphorus mutchleri Rivnay, 1929^{i c g b}
- Ripiphorus neomexicanus Rivnay, 1929^{i c g}
- Ripiphorus nevadicus (LeConte, 1880)^{i c g}
- Ripiphorus nomiae Rivnay, 1929^{i c g}
- Ripiphorus popenoei (LeConte, 1880)^{i c g}
- Ripiphorus rex^{b}
- Ripiphorus scaber (LeConte, 1852)^{i c g}
- Ripiphorus schwarzi (LeConte, 1880)^{i c g b}
- Ripiphorus semiflavus (LeConte, 1865)^{i c g}
- Ripiphorus sexdens Linsley & MacSwain, 1950^{i c g b}
- Ripiphorus simplex Champion, 1891^{i c g}
- Ripiphorus smithi Linsley and MacSwain, 1950^{i c g}
- Ripiphorus solidaginis (Pierce, 1902)^{i c g}
- Ripiphorus stylopides (Newman, 1838)^{i c g}
- Ripiphorus subdipterus Bosc d'Antic, 1792^{g}
- Ripiphorus vierecki (Fall, 1907)^{i c g b}
- Ripiphorus walshi (LeConte, 1865)^{i c g}
- Ripiphorus walshii (LeConte, 1865)^{b}
- Ripiphorus zeschii (LeConte, 1880)^{g}

Data sources: i = ITIS, c = Catalogue of Life, g = GBIF, b = Bugguide.net
