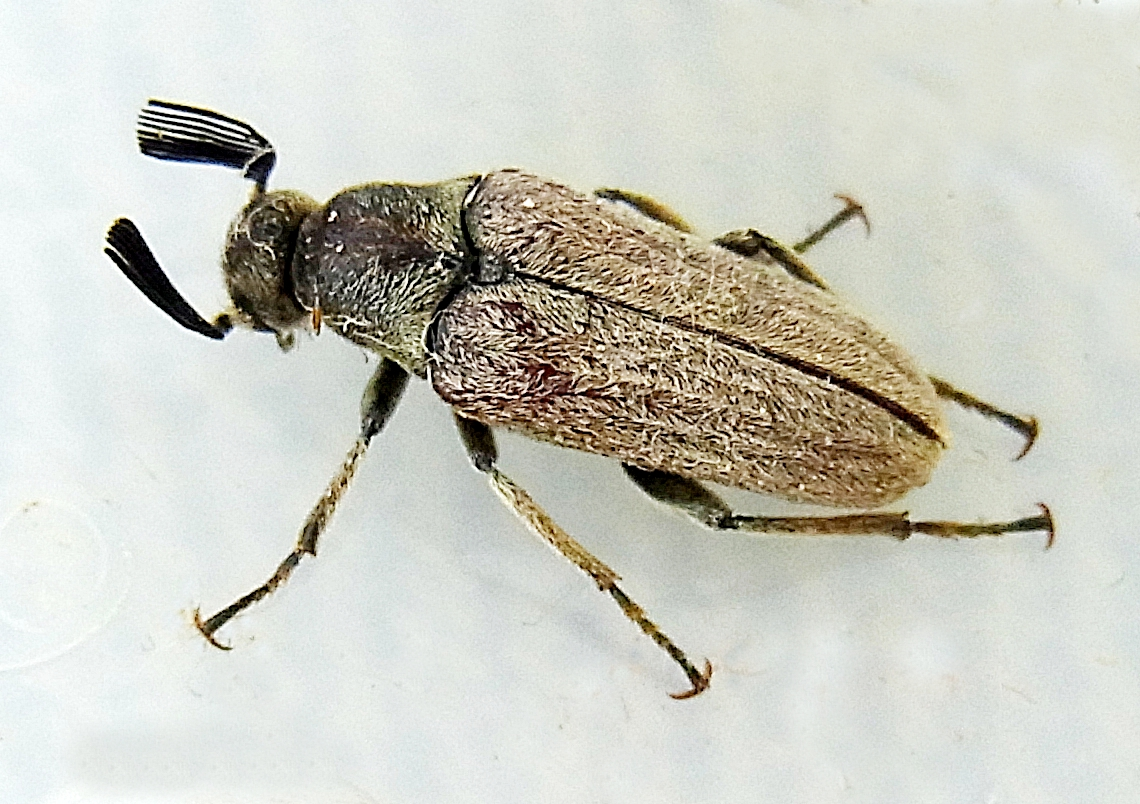
- Ptilophorus

Scientific classification
- Kingdom: Animalia
- Phylum: Arthropoda
- Class: Insecta
- Order: Coleoptera
- Suborder: Polyphaga
- Infraorder: Cucujiformia
- Family: Ripiphoridae
- Subfamily: Ptilophorinae
- Genus: Ptilophorus; Dejean, 1834

Synonyms
- Toposcopus LeConte, 1868

= Ptilophorus =

Genus of beetles

Ptilophorus is a genus of wedge-shaped beetles in the family Ripiphoridae. There are at least three described species in Ptilophorus.

== Species ==
These three species belong to the genus Ptilophorus:

- Ptilophorus dufourii (Latreille, 1817)
- Ptilophorus fischeri Ménétriés
- Ptilophorus wrightii (LeConte, 1868)
