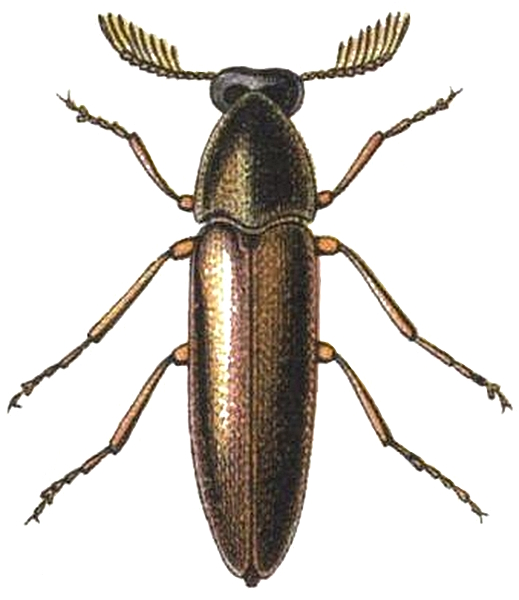

Scientific classification
- Kingdom: Animalia
- Phylum: Arthropoda
- Clade: Pancrustacea
- Class: Insecta
- Order: Coleoptera
- Suborder: Polyphaga
- Infraorder: Cucujiformia
- Family: Ripiphoridae
- Subfamily: Pelecotominae
- Genus: Pelecotoma; Fischer, 1809

= Pelecotoma =

Genus of beetles

Pelecotoma is a genus of wedge-shaped beetles in the family Ripiphoridae. There are at least three described species in Pelecotoma.

== Species ==
These three species belong to the genus Pelecotoma:

- Pelecotoma fennica (Paykull, 1799)
- Pelecotoma flavipes Melsheimer, 1846
- Pelecotoma septentrionalis Kono, 1936
