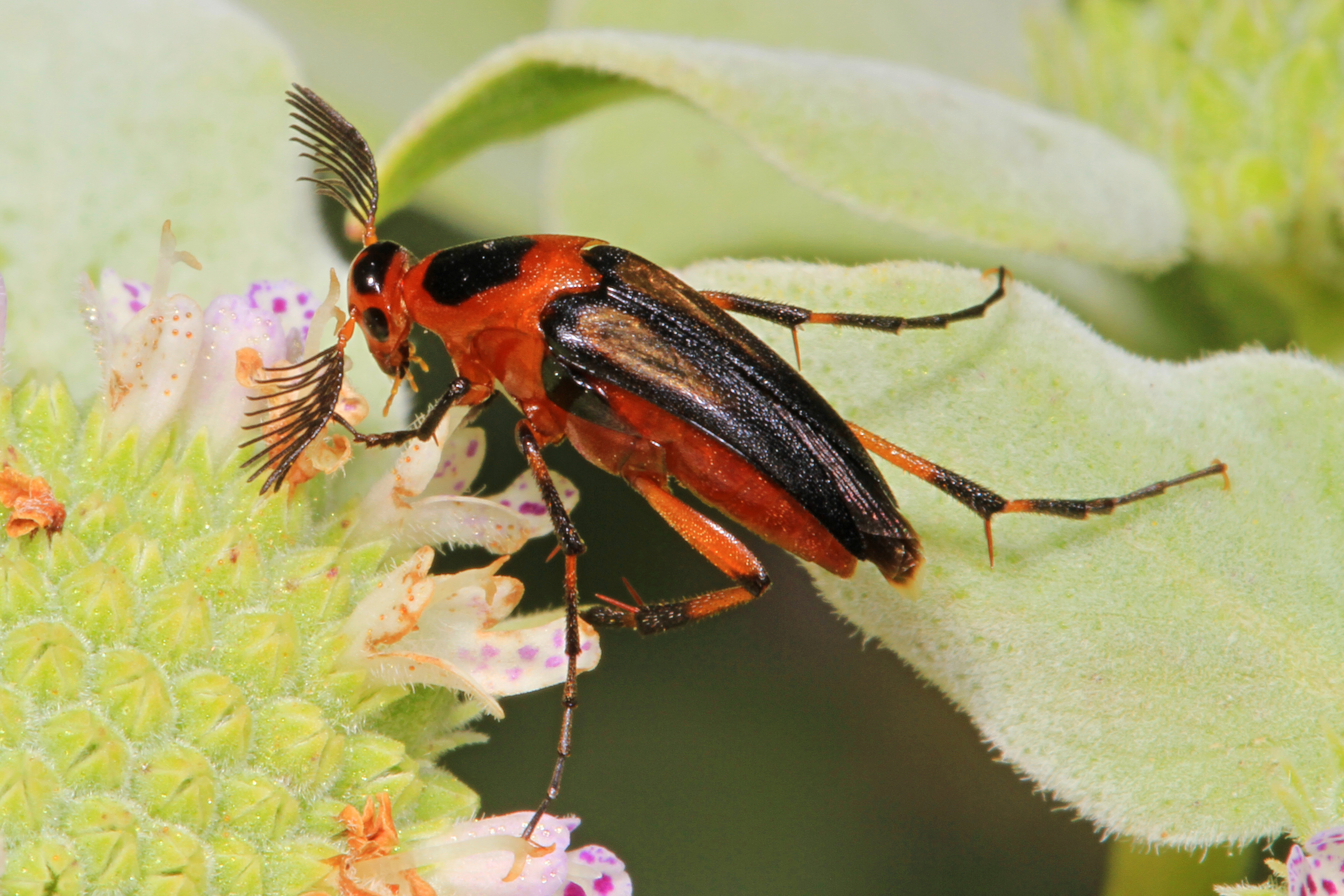
- Macrosiagon limbata, male

Scientific classification
- Kingdom: Animalia
- Phylum: Arthropoda
- Clade: Pancrustacea
- Class: Insecta
- Order: Coleoptera
- Suborder: Polyphaga
- Infraorder: Cucujiformia
- Family: Ripiphoridae
- Subfamily: Ripiphorinae
- Genus: Macrosiagon; Hentz, 1830

= Macrosiagon =

Genus of beetles

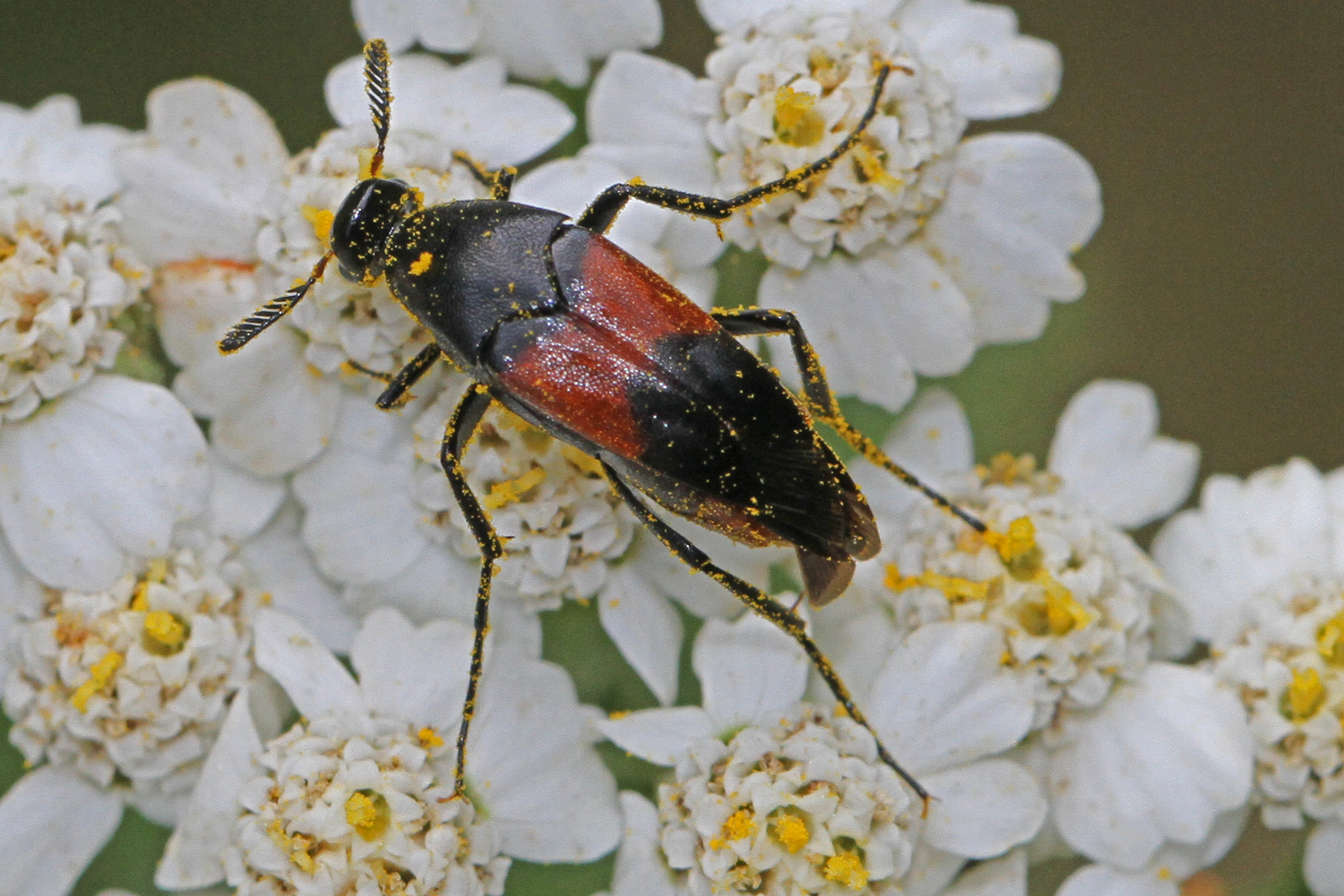
Macrosiagon pectinata

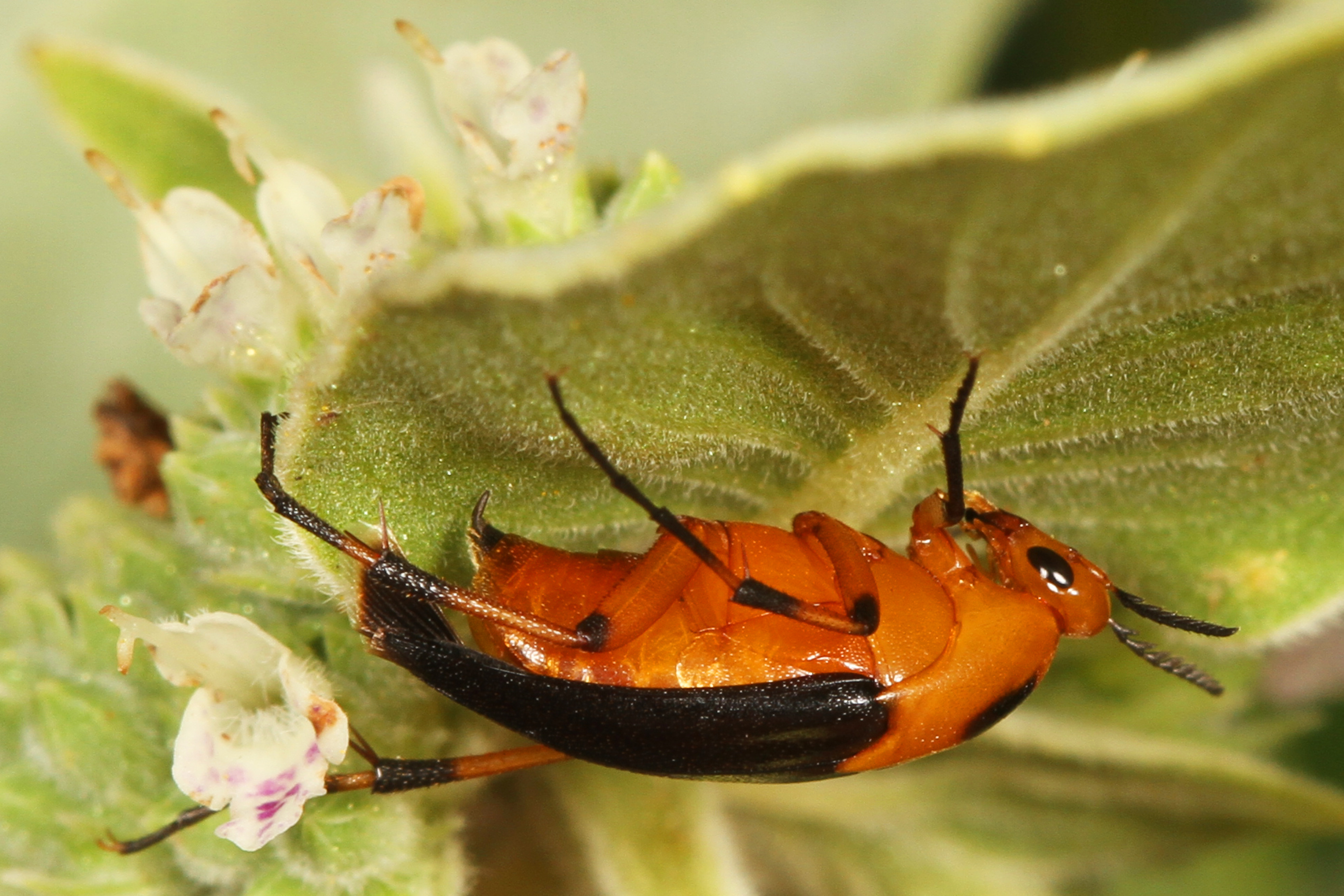
Macrosiagon limbata, female

Macrosiagon is a genus of wedge-shaped beetles in the family Ripiphoridae. There are more than 20 described species in Macrosiagon. Under the rules of the ICZN, the nomenclatural gender of the genus name is feminine, as it is based on the Greek word "siagon" (σῐᾱγών), for "jaw", which is feminine in gender (), despite recent publications erroneously treating the gender as neuter.

== Selected species ==
- Macrosiagon acutipennis Pierce, 1904
- Macrosiagon bifasciata (Marseul, 1877)
- Macrosiagon bifoveata Horn, 1875
- Macrosiagon bimaculata (Fabricius, 1787)
- Macrosiagon bipunctata (Fabricius, 1801)
- Macrosiagon capito (Blackburn, 1899)
- Macrosiagon championi (Blackburn, 1899)
- Macrosiagon crassipes (Lea, 1917)
- Macrosiagon cruenta (Germar, 1824)
- Macrosiagon cucullata (W.J. Macleay, 1887)
- Macrosiagon cyanivestis Marseul, 1876
- †Macrosiagon deuvei Batelka, Collomb & Nel, 2006
- Macrosiagon difficilis (Blackburn, 1899)
- Macrosiagon dimidiata (Fabricius, 1781)
- Macrosiagon diversiceps (Blackburn, 1899)
- Macrosiagon elegans Marseul, 1876
- Macrosiagon ebboi Perrichot, Nel & Néraudeau, 2004
- Macrosiagon fernalda Rivnay, 1929
- Macrosiagon ferruginea (Fabricius, 1775)
- Macrosiagon flavipennis (LeConte, 1866)
- Macrosiagon fortieri (Chobaut, 1893)
- Macrosiagon grombczewskii (Semenov, 1891)
- Macrosiagon interioris (Blackburn, 1899)
- Macrosiagon laeviceps (Lea, 1917)
- Macrosiagon limbata (Fabricius, 1792)
- Macrosiagon macleayi Csiki, 1913
- Macrosiagon maculicollis (Boheman, 1858)
- Macrosiagon medvedevi Iablokoff-Khnzorian, 1973
- Macrosiagon meridionalis (Costa, 1859)
- Macrosiagon nasuta (Thunberg, 1784)
- Macrosiagon nigroapicalis (Lea, 1917)
- Macrosiagon novaehollandiae (Gerstaecker, 1855)
- Macrosiagon oberthurii (Fairmaire, 1879)
- Macrosiagon octomaculata (Gerstaecker, 1855)
- Macrosiagon pallidipennis (Reitter, 1898)
- Macrosiagon pectinata (Fabricius, 1775)
- Macrosiagon pictipennis (Lea, 1904)
- Macrosiagon praeusta (Gebler, 1830)
- Macrosiagon punctata (Fabricius, 1787)
- Macrosiagon punctulaticeps (Blackburn, 1899)
- Macrosiagon pusilla (Gerstaecker, 1855)
- Macrosiagon rufofasciata (Lea, 1917)
- Macrosiagon sayi (LeConte, 1858)
- Macrosiagon semipunctata (Lea, 1904)
- Macrosiagon setipennis (Lea, 1917)
- Macrosiagon sobrina (Waterhouse, 1883)
- Macrosiagon spinicollis (Fairmaire, 1893)
- Macrosiagon terminata (Laporte, 1840)
- Macrosiagon tricolor (Gerstaecker, 1855)
- Macrosiagon tricuspidata (Lepechin, 1774)
- Macrosiagon vittata (Erichson, 1847)
