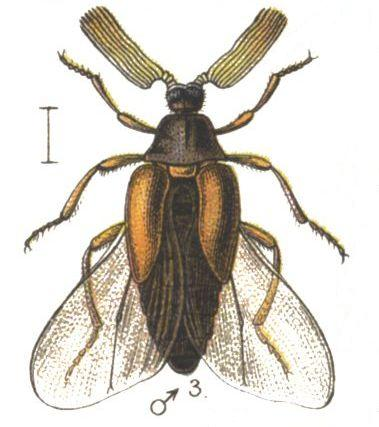
- Rhipidius pectinicornis

Scientific classification
- Kingdom: Animalia
- Phylum: Arthropoda
- Class: Insecta
- Order: Coleoptera
- Suborder: Polyphaga
- Infraorder: Cucujiformia
- Family: Ripiphoridae
- Genus: Ripidius; Thunberg, 1806

= Ripidius =

Genus of beetles

Ripidius is a genus of beetles belonging to the family Ripiphoridae.

The species of this genus are found in Europe and North America.

== Selected species ==
- Ripidius longicollis Schilder, 1923
- Ripidius mexicanus Zaragoza-Caballero, 1983
- Ripidius quadriceps Abeille De Perrin, 1872
