= Trigonodera =

Scientific classification
- Kingdom: Animalia
- Phylum: Arthropoda
- Class: Insecta
- Order: Coleoptera
- Suborder: Polyphaga
- Infraorder: Cucujiformia
- Family: Ripiphoridae
- Subfamily: Pelecotominae
- Genus: Trigonodera; Dejean, 1834

Genus of beetles

Trigonodera is a genus of wedge-shaped beetles in the family Ripiphoridae. There are at least three described species in Trigonodera.

== Species ==
These three species belong to the genus Trigonodera:

- Trigonodera nubila Gerstaecker, 1855
- Trigonodera schaefferi Rivnay, 1929
- Trigonodera tokejii (Nomura & Nakane, 1959)
