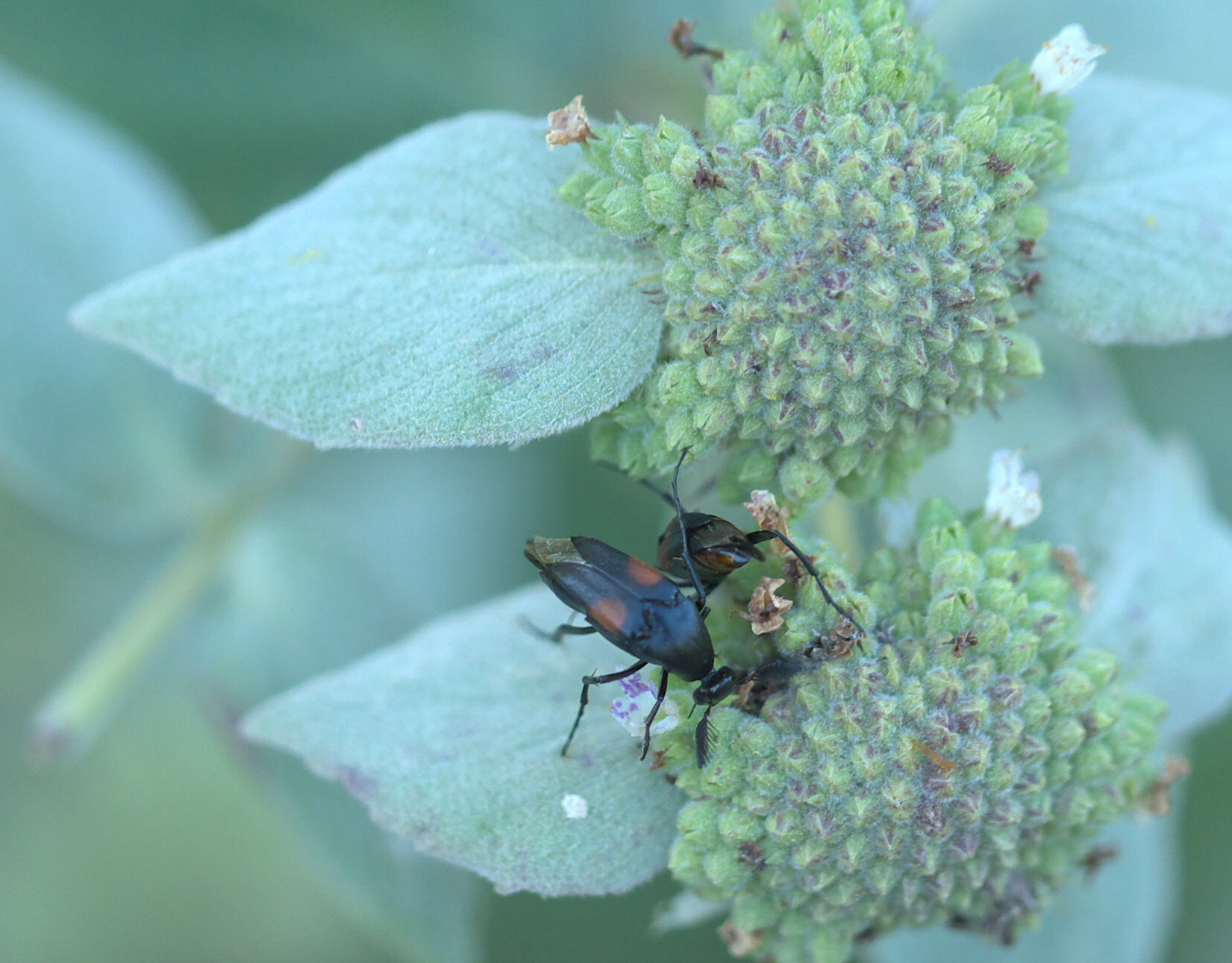
- Macrosiagon cruenta

Scientific classification
- Kingdom: Animalia
- Phylum: Arthropoda
- Class: Insecta
- Order: Coleoptera
- Suborder: Polyphaga
- Infraorder: Cucujiformia
- Family: Ripiphoridae
- Subfamily: Ripiphorinae; Gemminger & Harold, 1870

= Ripiphorinae =

Subfamily of beetles

Ripiphorinae is a subfamily of wedge-shaped beetles in the family Ripiphoridae. There are at least 2 genera and 40 described species in Ripiphorinae.

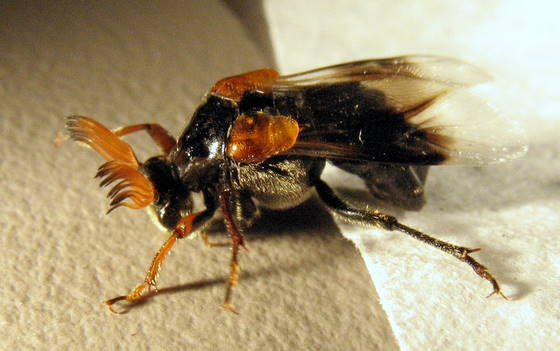
Ripiphorus diadasiae

== Genera ==
These two genera belong to the subfamily Ripiphorinae:

- Macrosiagon Hentz, 1830^{i c g b}
- Ripiphorus Bosc, 1791^{i c g b}

Data sources: i = ITIS, c = Catalogue of Life, g = GBIF, b = Bugguide.net
