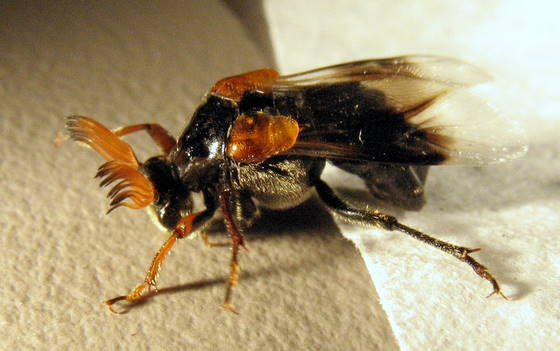
- Ripiphorus diadasiae male. Note the characteristically small elytra and flabellate antennae

Scientific classification
- Kingdom: Animalia
- Phylum: Arthropoda
- Class: Insecta
- Order: Coleoptera
- Suborder: Polyphaga
- Infraorder: Cucujiformia
- Superfamily: Tenebrionoidea
- Family: Ripiphoridae; Laporte, 1840

Subfamilies
- Hemirhipidiinae; Micholaeminae; Pelecotominae; Ptilophorinae; Ripidiinae; Ripiphorinae

Synonyms
- Rhipiphoridae

= Ripiphoridae =

Wedge-shaped beetles Temporal range: Albian–Recent

Family of beetles

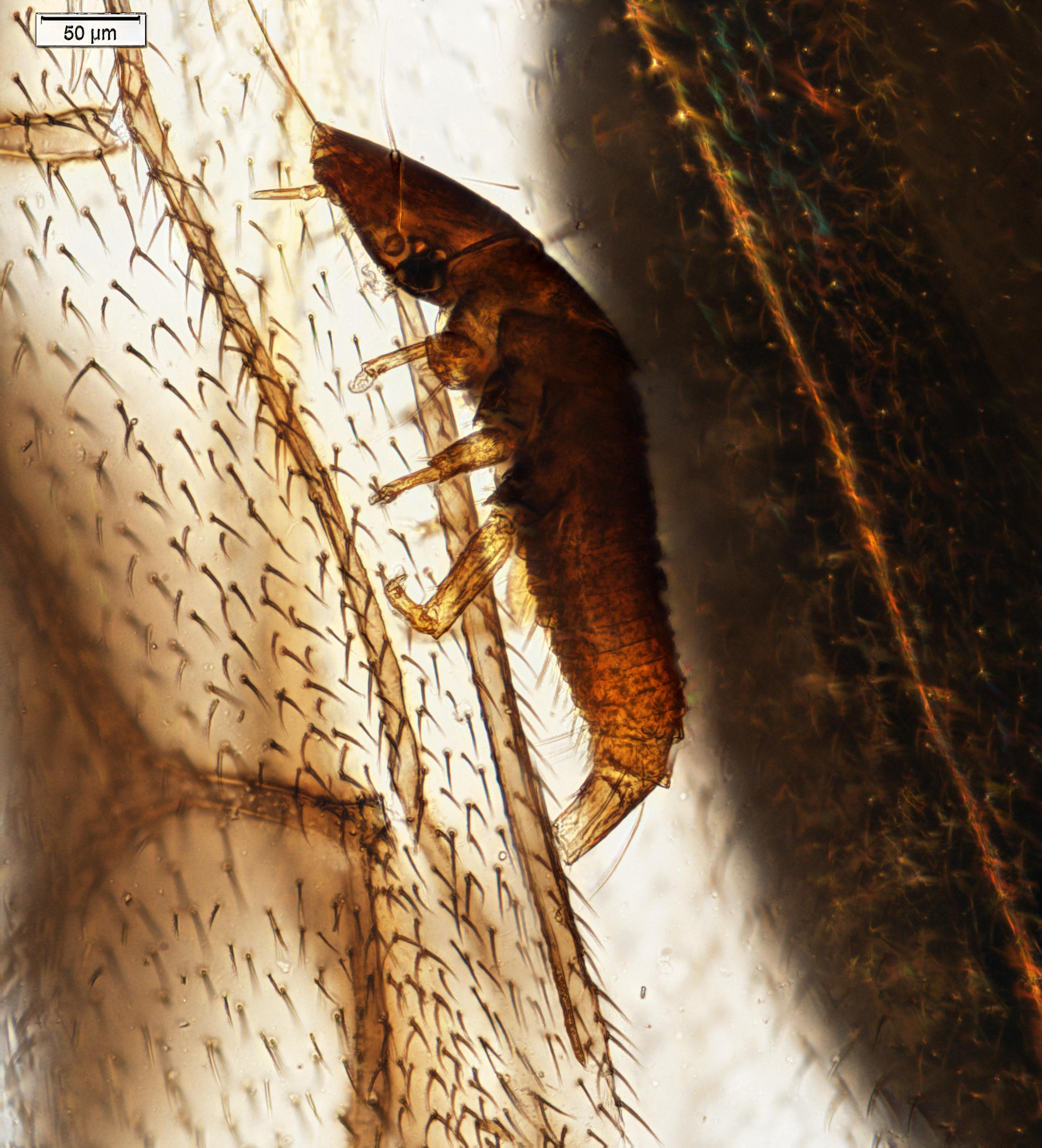
Ripiphorid triungulin on a braconid wasp wing

Ripiphoridae (formerly spelled Rhipiphoridae) is a cosmopolitan family of some 450 described species of beetles sometimes called "wedge-shaped beetles". Ripiphoridae are unusual among beetle families in that many species are hypermetamorphic parasitoids, an attribute that they share with the Meloidae. Members of the family differ in their choice of hosts, but most attack various species of bees or wasps, while some others attack cockroaches or beetles. Many species of Ripiphoridae have abbreviated elytra, and flabellate or pectinate antennae.

== Biology ==
The subfamily Ripiphorinae parasitise bees and wasps (Hymenoptera), while Ripidiinae parasitises cockroaches (Blattodea) and Pelecotominae parasitises larvae of wood-boring beetles (Coleoptera).

Species that attack bees typically lay their eggs on flowers. There the eggs hatch almost immediately into small planidial larvae and lie in wait for a visiting host. The planidium mounts the bee and rides it back to the hive. There it dismounts and seeks a cell occupied by a host larva. The planidium then enters the body of the host. It changes its skin and shape, then remains more or less dormant until the host larva pupates. It then emerges from the bee pupa and begins to feed. It eats the entire pupa, then pupates in its turn and completes its metamorphosis before emerging from the hive to mate and lay eggs.

In species that parasitise cockroaches, males are winged while the females are wingless and larviform. Both sexes of adults cannot feed due to reduced mouthparts. Adult females attract males using pheromones to mate, then lay eggs on the spot. The eggs hatch into larvae which attack cockroach nymphs. Upon maturity, the ripiphorid larva emerges from its host's last abdominal segments and pupates nearby.

In species that attack wood-boring beetles, adults occur on dead trees or on dead parts of living trees. They mate and then the females lay eggs into wood using a long, stiff, needle-shaped ovipositor. Larvae hatch and actively search for host beetle larvae, able to survive for at least 10 days without finding a host. When a host is found, the ripiphorid larva pierces into it with the help of a narcotising substance it injects. It feeds within the host, then emerges and continues feeding as an ectoparasitoid. When development is complete, the larva acts as a wood-borer itself, creating an emergence gallery and pupating at the apical end of this gallery.

== Evolution ==
Fossil species in the genera Paleoripiphorus, Macrosiagon, Cretaceoripidius, Flabellotoma, Burmitoma, Plesiotoma, and Amberocula have been described from mid- to lower-Cretaceous amber from sites in France, Germany and Myanmar.

== Genera ==
- Alloclinops Broun, 1921^{g}
- Ancholaemus Gerstaecker, 1855^{g}
- Blattivorus Chobaut, 1891^{g}
- Clinopalpus Batelka, 2009^{g}
- Clinops Gerstaecker, 1855^{g}
- Elytroxystrotus Manfrini de Brewer, 1963
- Euctenia Gerstaecker, 1855
- Falsorhipidius Pic, 1947
- Geoscopus Gerstaecker, 1855^{g}
- Hemirhipidius Heller, 1920
- Heteromeroxylon Pic, 1939
- Ivierhipidius Barclay, 2015
- Macrosiagon Hentz, 1830^{i c g b}
- Metoecus Dejean, 1834^{g}
- Micholaemus Viana, 1971^{g}
- Micropelecotoides Pic, 1910
- Neonephrites Riek, 1955
- Neopauroripidius Falin & Engel, 2014^{g}
- Neorhipidius Riek, 1955
- Neorrhipidius Viana, 1958^{g}
- Nephrites Shuckard, 1838
- Paranephrites Riek, 1955
- Pelecotoma Fischer, 1809^{i c g b}
- Pirhidius Besuchet, 1957^{b}
- Pseudorhipidius Chobaut, 1894
- Pterydrias Reitter, 1895
- Ptilophorus Dejean, 1834^{i c g b}
- Quasipirhidius Zaragoza, 1992
- Quasirhipidius Zaragoza, 1992^{g}
- Rhipidioides Riek, 1955
- Rhipidocyrtus Falin & Engel, 2014^{g}
- Rhipistena Sharp, 1878^{g}
- Riekella Selander, 1957
- Ripidius Thunberg, 1806^{i c g}
- Ripiphorus Bosc, 1791^{i c g b}
- Scotoscopus Reitter, 1884^{g}
- Sharpides Kirkaldy, 1910
- Sitarida White, 1846
- Trigonodera Dejean, 1834^{i c g b}
- Zapotecotoma Engel, Falin, & Batelka, 2019^{i c g b}

Data sources: i = ITIS, c = Catalogue of Life, g = GBIF, b = Bugguide.net

=== Extinct genera ===
- Subfamily Pelecotominae
  - †Burmitoma Batelka et al., 2018 Burmese amber, Myanmar, Cenomanian
  - †Flabellotoma Batelka et al., 2016 Burmese amber, Myanmar, Cenomanian
  - †Plesiotoma Batelka et al., 2018 Burmese amber, Myanmar, Cenomanian
  - †Samlandotoma Alekseev, 2019 Baltic amber, Russia, Eocene
  - †Spinotoma Hsiao & Huang, 2017 Burmese amber, Myanmar, Cenomanian
- Subfamily Ripidiinae
  - †Olemehliella Batelka, 2017 Baltic amber, Russia, Eocene
  - †Pauroripidius Kaupp & Nagel, 2001 Baltic amber, Russia, Eocene
  - Tribe Ripidiini
    - †Amberocula Batelka et al., 2018 Burmese amber, Myanmar, Cenomanian
    - †Cretaceoripidius Falin & Engel, 2010 Burmese amber, Myanmar, Cenomanian
    - †Paleoripiphorus Perrichot et al., 2004 Charentese amber, France, Cenomanian Burmese amber, Myanmar, Cenomanian
    - †Protoripidius Cai et al., 2018 Burmese amber, Myanmar, Cenomanian
