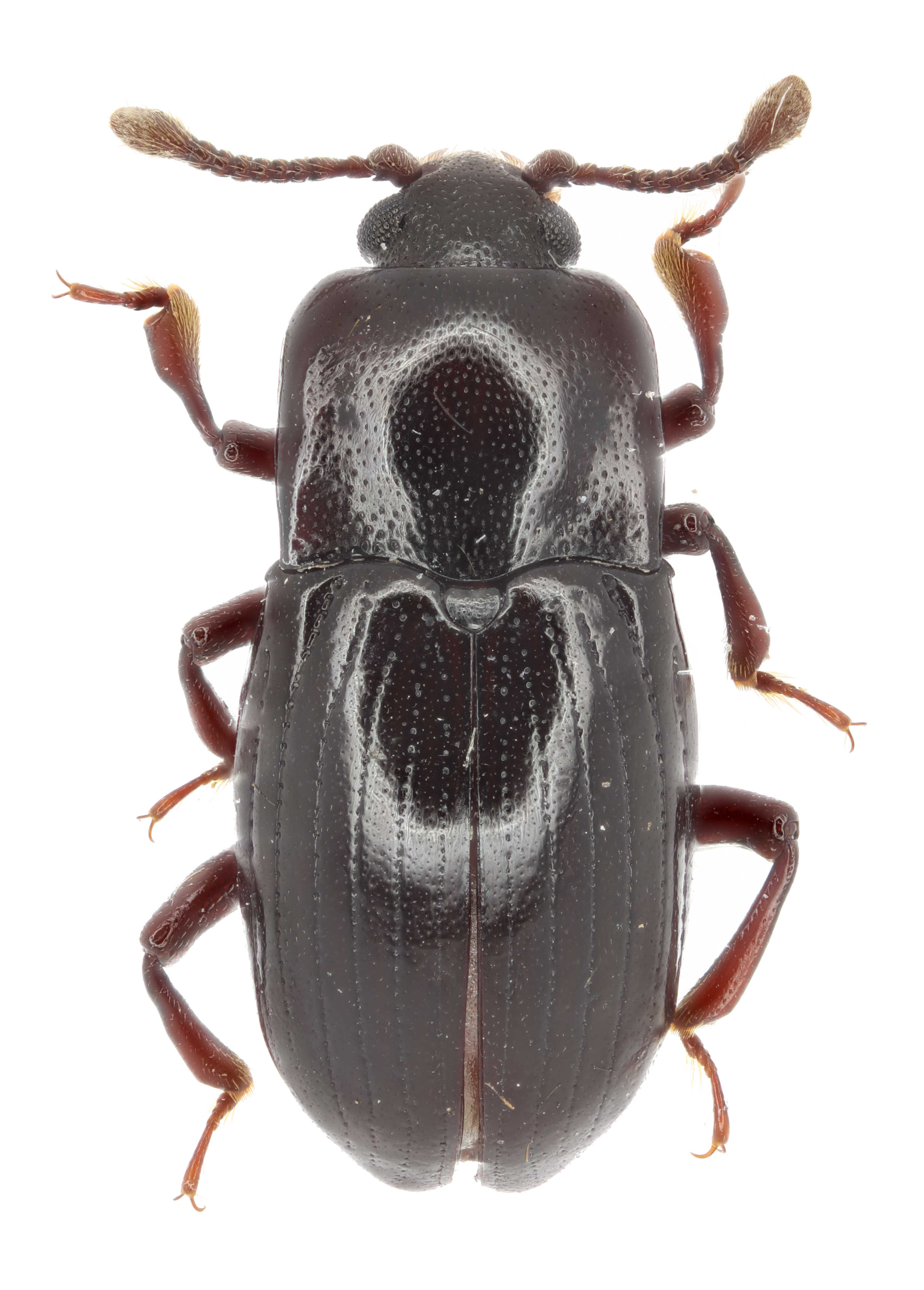
- Adult of unidentified Afrorylon species from Côte d'Ivoire

Scientific classification
- Kingdom: Animalia
- Phylum: Arthropoda
- Clade: Pancrustacea
- Class: Insecta
- Order: Coleoptera
- Suborder: Polyphaga
- Infraorder: Cucujiformia
- Family: Cerylonidae
- Subfamily: Ceryloninae; Billberg, 1820

Genera
- See text

= Ceryloninae =

Subfamily of beetles

Ceryloninae is a subfamily of beetles in the family Cerylonidae.

== Genera ==
- Acautomus
- Afrorylon
- Angolon
- Australiorylon
- Axiocerylon
- Cautomus
- Cerylon
- Clavicerylon
- Coccilon
- Ellipsorylon
- Elytrotetrantus
- Glomerylon
- Glyptolopus
- Gyrelon
- Ivieus
- Lapethinus
- Lawrenciella
- Lytopeplus
- Mychocerus
- Neolapethus
- Nkolbissonia
- Orientrylon
- Oroussetia
- Pachylon
- Pakalukia
- Paracerylon
- Paraxiocerylon
- Pathelus
- Philothermopsis
- Philothermus
- Ploeosoma
- Pseudocerylon
- Pseudolapethus
- Rostrorylon
- Spinocerylon
- Suakokoia
- Thyroderus

Hypodacne and Pseudodacne, formerly placed here or in the Erotylidae (some of which they resemble), has been moved to the newly-validated Euxestidae family, while Mychocerinus is in the Murmidiidae which were also recently elevated to full family rank.
