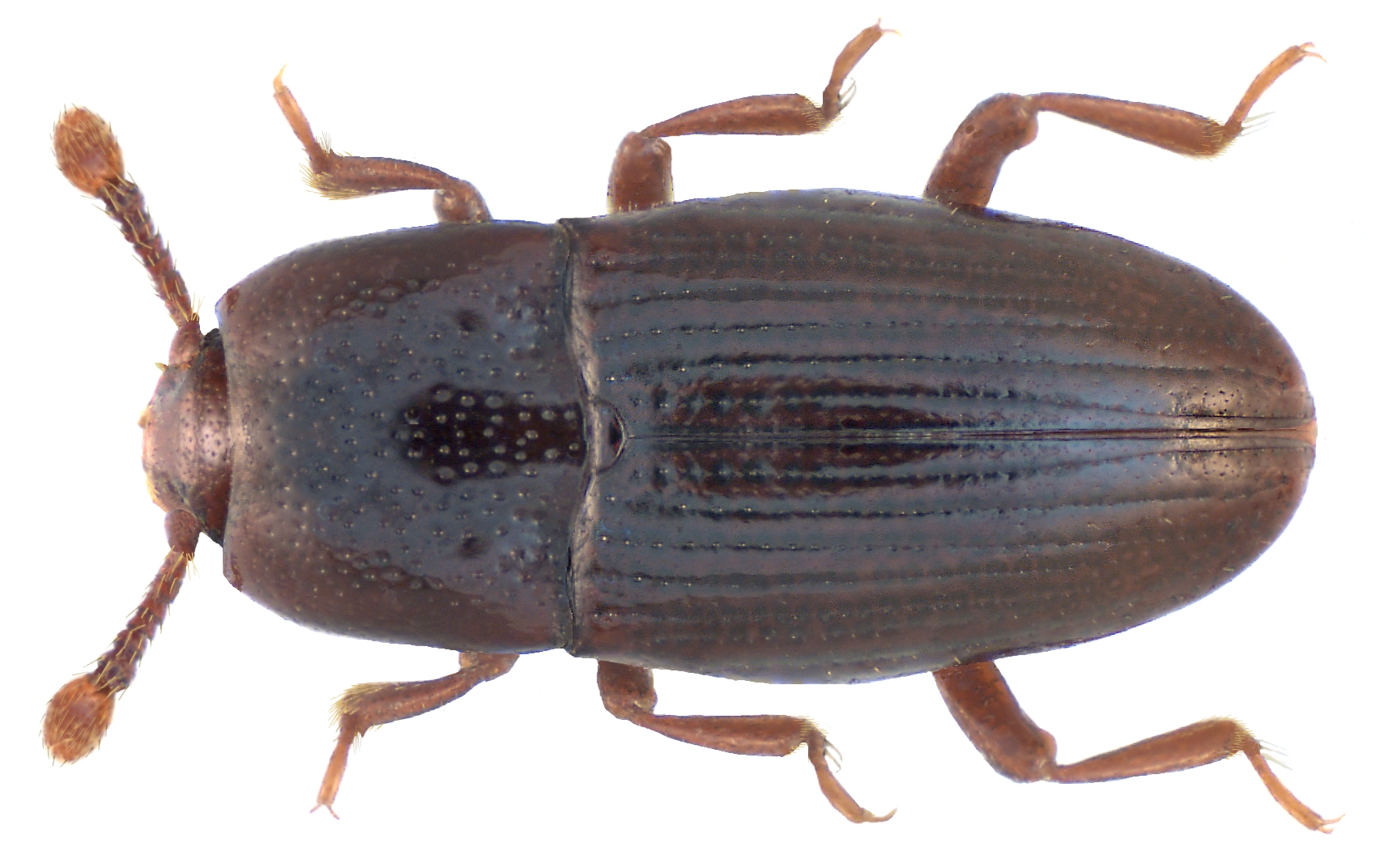
- Cerylon fagi

Scientific classification
- Domain: Eukaryota
- Kingdom: Animalia
- Phylum: Arthropoda
- Class: Insecta
- Order: Coleoptera
- Suborder: Polyphaga
- Infraorder: Cucujiformia
- Family: Cerylonidae
- Genus: Cerylon
- Species: C. fagi

Binomial name
- Cerylon fagi Brisout, 1867

= Cerylon fagi =

Species of beetle

Cerylon fagi is a beetle species in the subfamily Ceryloninae.
