= Mychocerus discretus =

Scientific classification
- Kingdom: Animalia
- Phylum: Arthropoda
- Class: Insecta
- Order: Coleoptera
- Suborder: Polyphaga
- Infraorder: Cucujiformia
- Family: Cerylonidae
- Genus: Mychocerus
- Species: M. discretus

Binomial name
- Mychocerus discretus (Casey, 1890)

Species of beetle

Mychocerus discretus is a species of minute bark beetle in the family Cerylonidae. It is found in North America.
