= Philothermus glabriculus =

Scientific classification
- Domain: Eukaryota
- Kingdom: Animalia
- Phylum: Arthropoda
- Class: Insecta
- Order: Coleoptera
- Suborder: Polyphaga
- Infraorder: Cucujiformia
- Family: Cerylonidae
- Genus: Philothermus
- Species: P. glabriculus

Binomial name
- Philothermus glabriculus Leconte, 1863

Species of beetle

Philothermus glabriculus is a species of minute bark beetle in the family Cerylonidae. It is found in North America.
