= Euxestus erithacus =

Scientific classification
- Kingdom: Animalia
- Phylum: Arthropoda
- Clade: Pancrustacea
- Class: Insecta
- Order: Coleoptera
- Suborder: Polyphaga
- Infraorder: Cucujiformia
- Family: Euxestidae
- Genus: Euxestus
- Species: E. erithacus

Binomial name
- Euxestus erithacus (Chevrolat, 1863)

Species of beetle

Euxestus erithacus is a species of well polished beetle in the family Euxestidae. It is found in North America, Oceania, and Europe.
