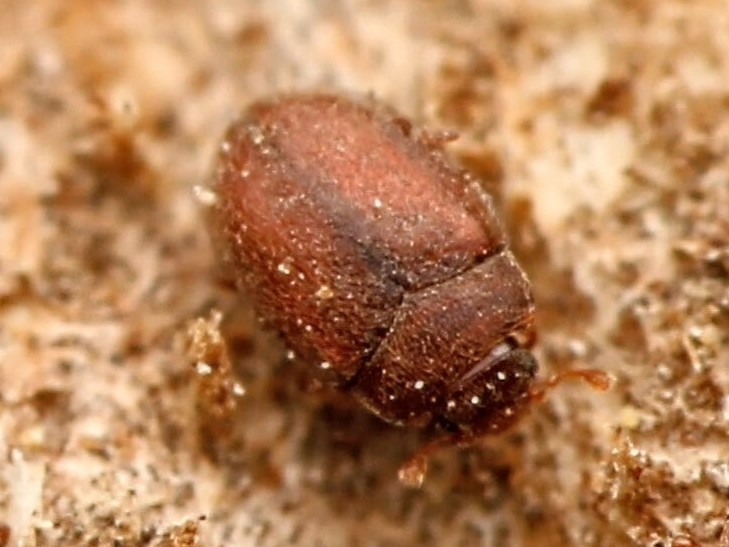

Scientific classification
- Kingdom: Animalia
- Phylum: Arthropoda
- Class: Insecta
- Order: Coleoptera
- Suborder: Polyphaga
- Infraorder: Cucujiformia
- Family: Murmidiidae
- Genus: Mychocerinus
- Species: M. depressus

Binomial name
- Mychocerinus depressus (LeConte, 1866)

= Mychocerinus depressus =

Species of beetle

Mychocerinus depressus is a species of beetle in the family Murmidiidae. It is found in North America.
