= Botrodus estriatus =

Scientific classification
- Kingdom: Animalia
- Phylum: Arthropoda
- Class: Insecta
- Order: Coleoptera
- Suborder: Polyphaga
- Infraorder: Cucujiformia
- Family: Murmidiidae
- Genus: Botrodus
- Species: B. estriatus

Binomial name
- Botrodus estriatus (Casey, 1890)

Species of beetle

Botrodus estriatus is a species of beetles from the family Murmidiidae. The scientific name of this species was first published in 1890 by Casey.
