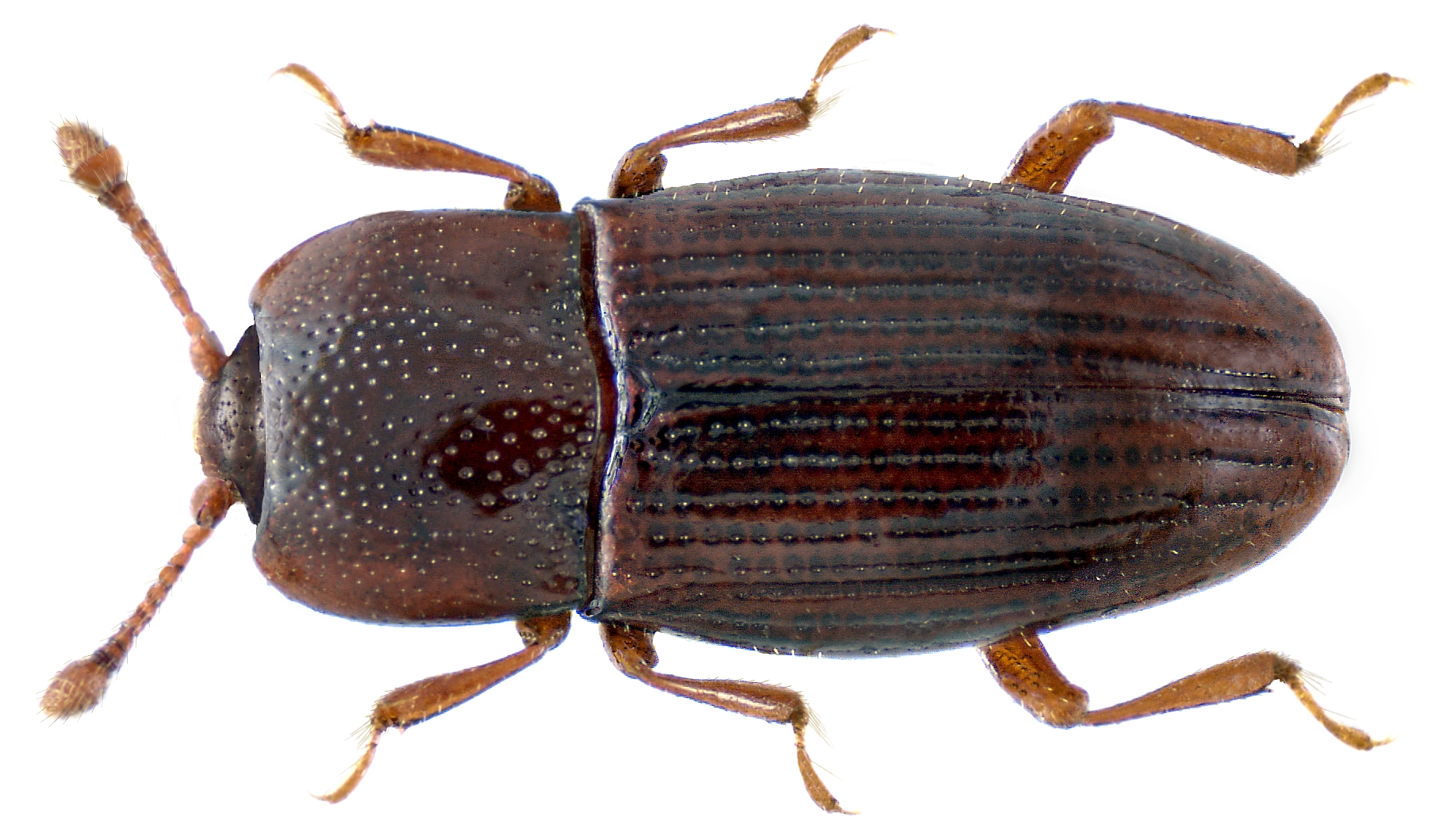

Scientific classification
- Kingdom: Animalia
- Phylum: Arthropoda
- Class: Insecta
- Order: Coleoptera
- Suborder: Polyphaga
- Infraorder: Cucujiformia
- Family: Cerylonidae
- Genus: Cerylon
- Species: C. ferrugineum

Binomial name
- Cerylon ferrugineum Stephens, 1830

= Cerylon ferrugineum =

Species of beetle

Cerylon ferrugineum is a species of Cerylonidae native to Europe.
