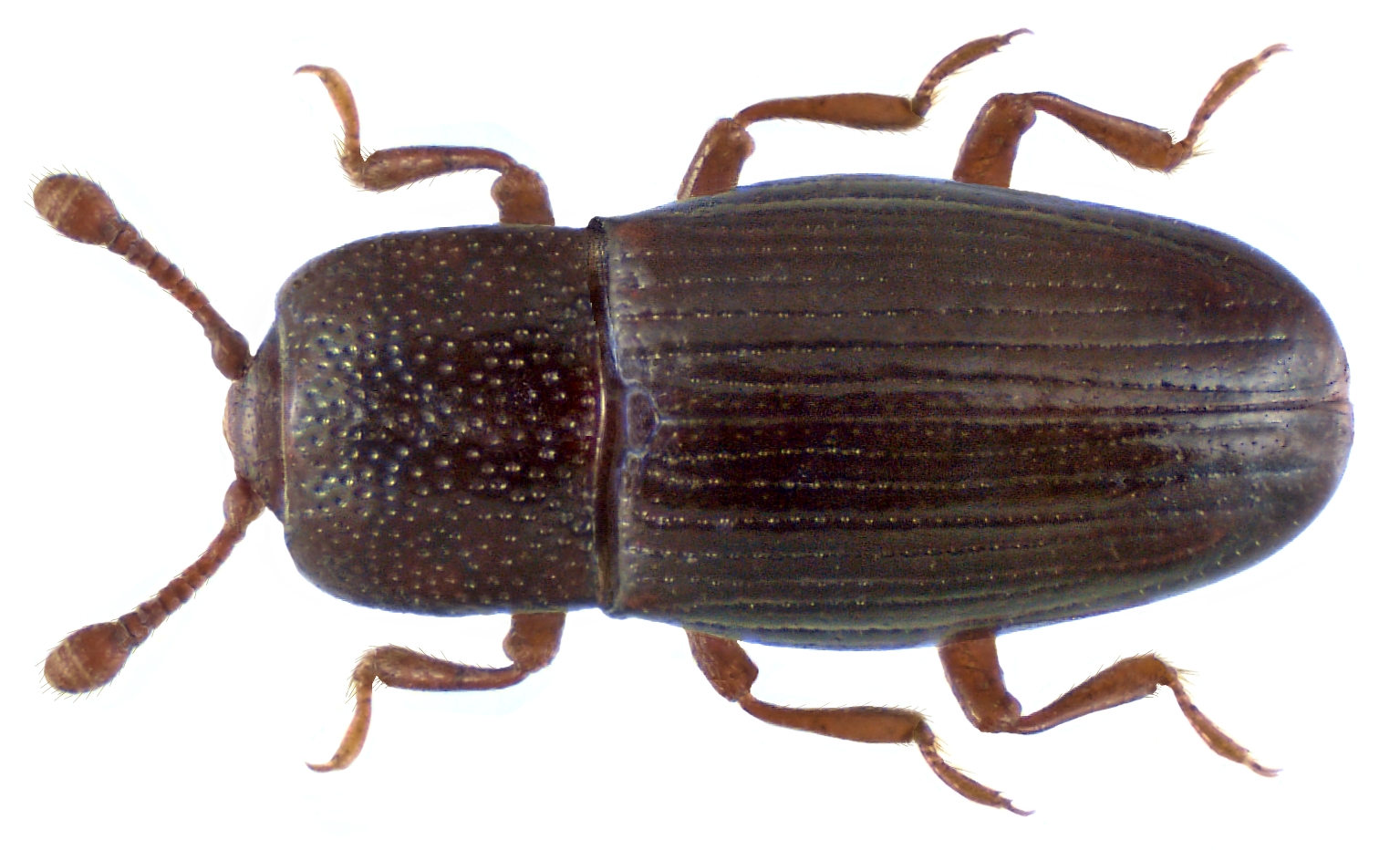
- Cerylon histeroides 2,1 mm (1,8-2,3 mm)

Scientific classification
- Kingdom: Animalia
- Phylum: Arthropoda
- Clade: Pancrustacea
- Class: Insecta
- Order: Coleoptera
- Suborder: Polyphaga
- Infraorder: Cucujiformia
- Family: Cerylonidae
- Genus: Cerylon
- Species: C. histeroides

Binomial name
- Cerylon histeroides (Fabricius, 1792)

= Cerylon histeroides =

Species of beetle

Cerylon histeroides is a species of Cerylonidae beetles native to Europe.
