= Mychocerus striatus =

Scientific classification
- Domain: Eukaryota
- Kingdom: Animalia
- Phylum: Arthropoda
- Class: Insecta
- Order: Coleoptera
- Suborder: Polyphaga
- Infraorder: Cucujiformia
- Family: Cerylonidae
- Genus: Mychocerus
- Species: M. striatus

Binomial name
- Mychocerus striatus (Sen Gupta & Crowson, 1973)

Species of beetle

Mychocerus striatus is a species of minute bark beetle in the family Cerylonidae. It is found in North America.
