= Cerylon castaneum =

Scientific classification
- Domain: Eukaryota
- Kingdom: Animalia
- Phylum: Arthropoda
- Class: Insecta
- Order: Coleoptera
- Suborder: Polyphaga
- Infraorder: Cucujiformia
- Family: Cerylonidae
- Genus: Cerylon
- Species: C. castaneum

Binomial name
- Cerylon castaneum Say, 1826

Synonyms
- Cerylon clypeale Casey, 1897; Cerylon sticticum Casey, 1897

Species of beetle

Cerylon castaneum is a species of minute bark beetle in the family Cerylonidae. It is found in North America.
