= Philothermus puberulus =

Scientific classification
- Domain: Eukaryota
- Kingdom: Animalia
- Phylum: Arthropoda
- Class: Insecta
- Order: Coleoptera
- Suborder: Polyphaga
- Infraorder: Cucujiformia
- Family: Cerylonidae
- Genus: Philothermus
- Species: P. puberulus

Binomial name
- Philothermus puberulus Schwarz, 1878

Species of beetle

Philothermus puberulus is a species of minute bark beetle in the family Cerylonidae. It is found in the Caribbean Sea, Central America, and North America.
