= Euxestus =

Scientific classification
- Kingdom: Animalia
- Phylum: Arthropoda
- Clade: Pancrustacea
- Class: Insecta
- Order: Coleoptera
- Suborder: Polyphaga
- Infraorder: Cucujiformia
- Family: Euxestidae
- Genus: Euxestus; Wollaston, 1858

Synonyms
- Neoplotera Belon, 1879; Tritomidea Motschulsky

Genus of beetles

Euxestus is a genus of well-polished beetles (family Euxestidae). They have formerly often been placed in the pleasing fungus beetle family (Erotylidae), or in the Cerylonidae (minute bark beetles), before the Euxestidae were recognized as a family of their own, closely related to the Cerylonidae (but also to the ladybeetle family Coccinellidae), but less closely to Erotylidae.

== Selected species ==
Species in genus Euxestus include:

- Euxestus analis Arrow, 1926
- Euxestus aneipennis Fauvel, 1903
- Euxestus erithacus (Chevrolat, 1863) (sometimes in E.parkii)
- Euxestus hypomelas Arrow, 1926
- Euxestus minor Blackburn & Sharp, 1885
- Euxestus parkii Wollaston, 1858 (= E.oblongus)
- Euxestus phalacroides Wollaston, 1877 (= E.angustus)
- Euxestus spec Wollaston, 1858
- Euxestus translucidus Arrow
