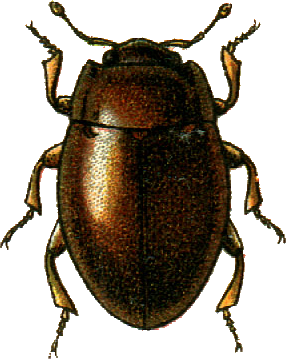
- Murmidius ovalis

Scientific classification
- Kingdom: Animalia
- Phylum: Arthropoda
- Clade: Pancrustacea
- Class: Insecta
- Order: Coleoptera
- Suborder: Polyphaga
- Infraorder: Cucujiformia
- Family: Murmidiidae
- Genus: Murmidius; Leach, 1822

= Murmidius =

Genus of beetles

Murmidius is a genus of beetles in the family Murmidiidae. There are at least twenty described species in Murmidius.

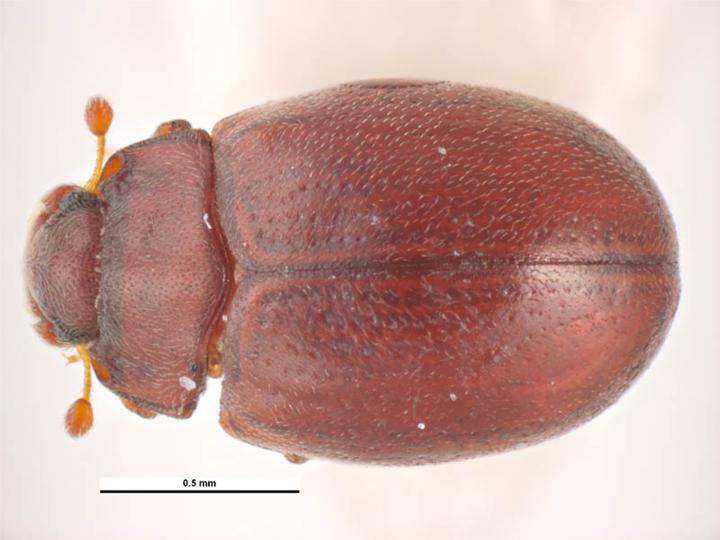
Murmidius ovalis

== Species ==
These species belong to the genus Murmidius:

- Murmidius araguanus Jałoszyński & Ślipiński, 2022
- Murmidius australicus Jałoszyński & Ślipiński, 2022
- Murmidius campbelli Jałoszyński & Ślipiński, 2022
- Murmidius convexus Jałoszyński & Ślipiński, 2022
- Murmidius drakei Heinze, 1944
- Murmidius elongatus Jałoszyński & Ślipiński, 2022
- Murmidius globosus Hinton, 1935
- Murmidius hawaiianus Jałoszyński & Ślipiński, 2022
- Murmidius hebrus Hinton, 1942
- Murmidius irregularis Reitter, 1878
- Murmidius lankanus Jałoszyński & Ślipiński, 2022
- Murmidius melon Guerrero, Ramírez & Vidal, 2018
- Murmidius meridensis Jałoszyński & Ślipiński, 2022
- Murmidius merkli Jałoszyński & Ślipiński, 2022
- Murmidius okinawanus Jałoszyński & Ślipiński, 2022
- Murmidius ovalis (Beck, 1817) (minute beetle)
- Murmidius panamanus Jałoszyński & Ślipiński, 2022
- Murmidius rectistriatus Lewis, 1888
- Murmidius segregatus Waterhouse, 1876
- Murmidius stoicus Hinton, 1942
- Murmidius tachiranus Jałoszyński & Ślipiński, 2022
- Murmidius trujilloensis Jałoszyński & Ślipiński, 2022
- Murmidius tydeus Hinton, 1942
