= Hypodacne =

Scientific classification
- Kingdom: Animalia
- Phylum: Arthropoda
- Clade: Pancrustacea
- Class: Insecta
- Order: Coleoptera
- Suborder: Polyphaga
- Infraorder: Cucujiformia
- Family: Euxestidae
- Genus: Hypodacne; LeConte, 1875

Synonyms
- Pachyochthes Reitter, 1897

Genus of insects

Hypodacne is a genus of well-polished beetles (family Euxestidae). As the name suggests, these beetles resemble the genus Dacne in the pleasing fungus beetle family (Erotylidae). They have formerly often been placed in that family, or in the Cerylonidae (minute bark beetles), before the Euxestidae were recognized as a family of their own, closely related to the Cerylonidae (but also to the ladybeetle family Coccinellidae), but less closely to Erotylidae.

Similarities with Dacne include fully margined prothorax and elytra bases, an elongated third antennae segment (longer than segment 4), the end segments of the maxillary palps being longer than wide, small punctures forming rows on the elytra, and the three basal segments of the tarsi being all equally wide. However, they differ in the number of antenna segments, with Dacne having 11 and Hypodacne only 10.

Species of Hypodacne include:

- Hypodacne edithae
- Hypodacne punctata LeConte, 1875

"Hypodacne" rubripes is now in genus Hypodacnella.
