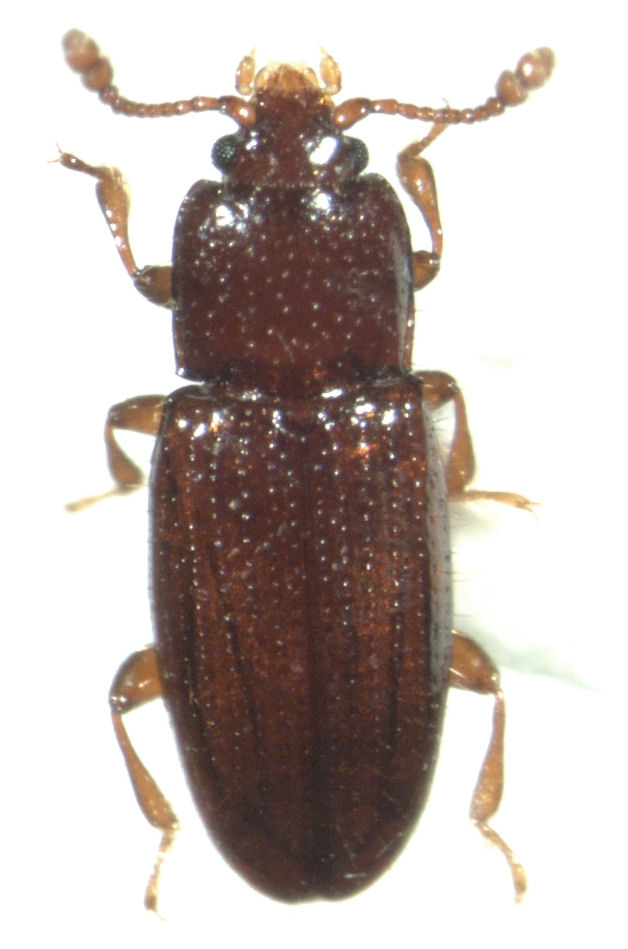

Scientific classification
- Domain: Eukaryota
- Kingdom: Animalia
- Phylum: Arthropoda
- Class: Insecta
- Order: Coleoptera
- Suborder: Polyphaga
- Infraorder: Cucujiformia
- Family: Cerylonidae
- Subfamily: Ceryloninae
- Genus: Philothermus; Aubé, 1843

= Philothermus =

Genus of beetles

Philothermus is a genus of minute bark beetles in the family Cerylonidae. There are about 17 described species in Philothermus.

== Species ==
These 17 species belong to the genus Philothermus:

- Philothermus borbonicus Dajoz, 1980
- Philothermus evanescens (Reitter, 1876)
- Philothermus exaratus (Chevrolat, 1864)
- Philothermus floridensis (Sen Gupta & Crowson, 1973)
- Philothermus glabriculus Leconte, 1863
- Philothermus gomyi Slipinski, 1982
- Philothermus guadeloupensis Grouvelle, 1902
- Philothermus kingsolveri Slipinski
- Philothermus liberiensis Sen Gupta & Crowson
- Philothermus montandoni Aubé, 1843
- Philothermus occidentalis Lawrence & Stephan, 1975
- Philothermus puberulus Schwarz, 1878
- Philothermus pubescens Sen Gupta & Crowson
- Philothermus semistriatus (Perris, 1865)
- Philothermus stephani Gimmel & Slipinski, 2007
- Philothermus vanua Slipinski
- Philothermus watti Slipinski
