= Mychocerus =

Scientific classification
- Kingdom: Animalia
- Phylum: Arthropoda
- Class: Insecta
- Order: Coleoptera
- Suborder: Polyphaga
- Infraorder: Cucujiformia
- Family: Cerylonidae
- Subfamily: Ceryloninae
- Genus: Mychocerus; Erichson, 1845

Synonyms
- Lapethus Casey, 1890

Genus of beetles

Mychocerus is a genus of minute bark beetles in the family Cerylonidae. There are at least two described species in Mychocerus.

== Species ==
These two species belong to the genus Mychocerus:

- Mychocerus discretus (Casey, 1890)
- Mychocerus striatus (Sen Gupta & Crowson, 1973)
