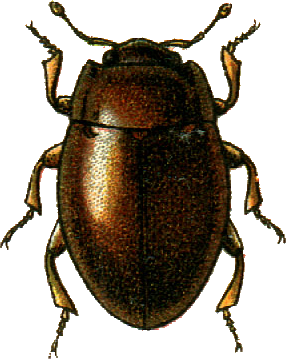

Scientific classification
- Domain: Eukaryota
- Kingdom: Animalia
- Phylum: Arthropoda
- Class: Insecta
- Order: Coleoptera
- Suborder: Polyphaga
- Infraorder: Cucujiformia
- Family: Murmidiidae
- Genus: Murmidius
- Species: M. ovalis

Binomial name
- Murmidius ovalis (Beck, 1817)

= Murmidius ovalis =

Species of beetle

Murmidius ovalis, known generally as the minute beetle or murmidius beetle, is a species of beetle in the family Murmidiidae. It is found in Europe and Northern Asia (excluding China) and North America.

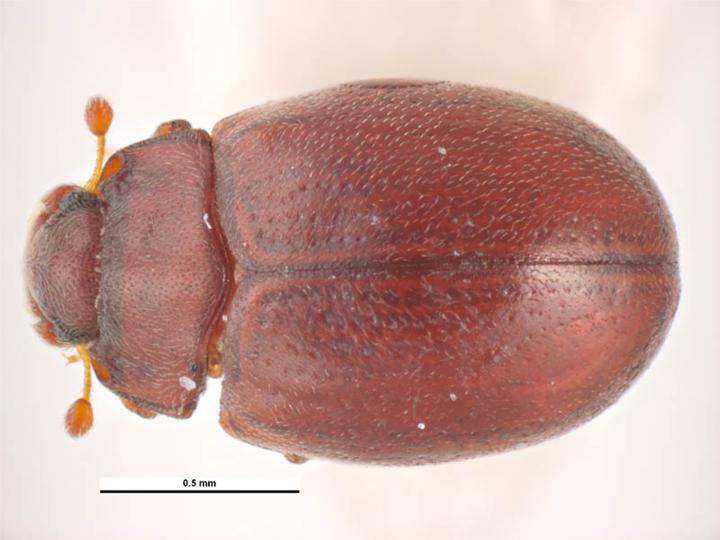
Minute beetle, Murmidius ovalis
