= Ostomopsis =

Scientific classification
- Domain: Eukaryota
- Kingdom: Animalia
- Phylum: Arthropoda
- Class: Insecta
- Order: Coleoptera
- Suborder: Polyphaga
- Infraorder: Cucujiformia
- Family: Cerylonidae
- Genus: Ostomopsis; Scott, 1922

Genus of beetles

Ostomopsis is a genus of minute bark beetles in the family Cerylonidae. There are at least three described species in Ostomopsis.

== Species ==
These three species belong to the genus Ostomopsis:

- Ostomopsis kuscheli Slipinski
- Ostomopsis neotropicalis Lawrence & Stephan, 1975
- Ostomopsis watti Slipinski
