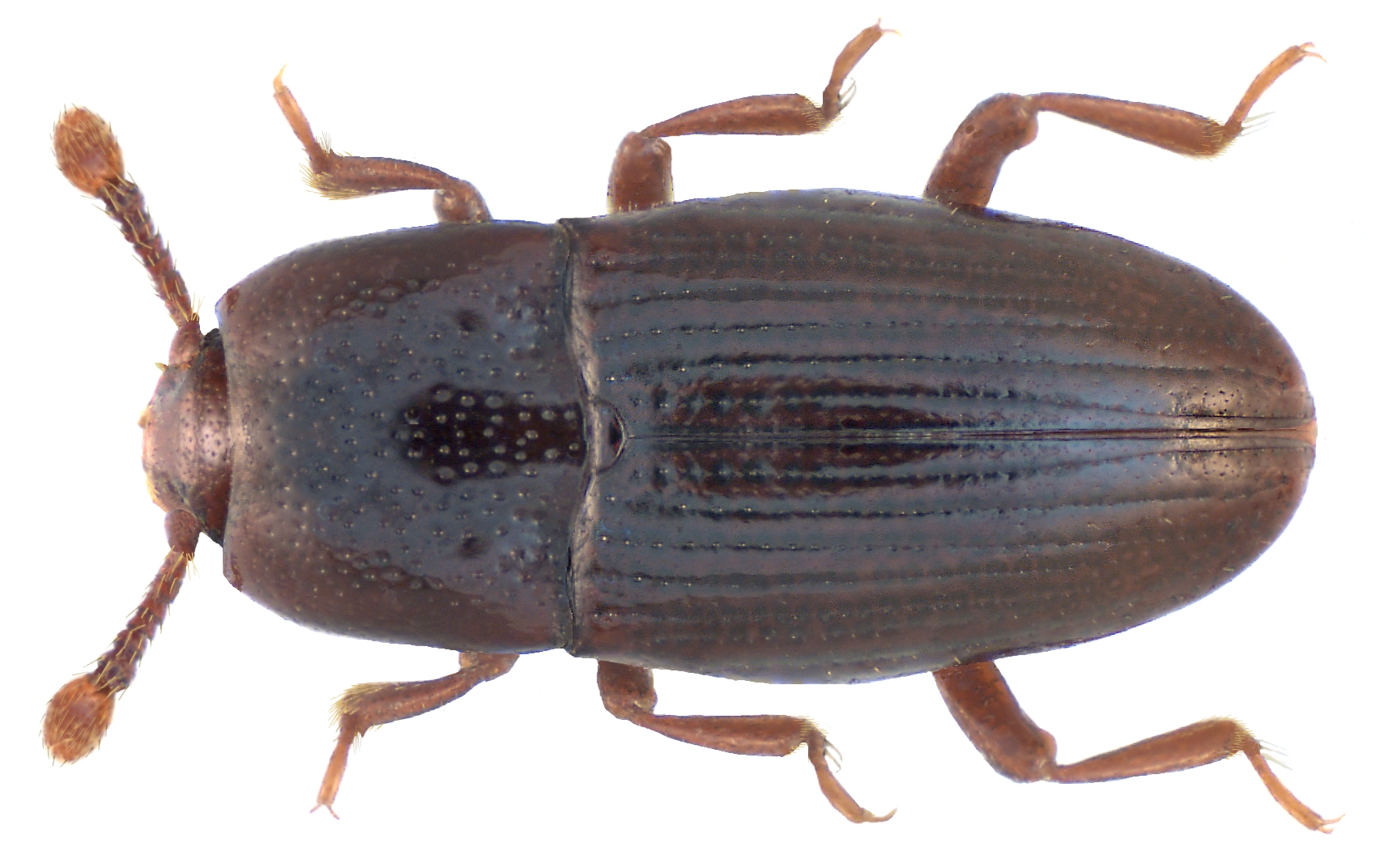
- Cerylon fagi

Scientific classification
- Kingdom: Animalia
- Phylum: Arthropoda
- Clade: Pancrustacea
- Class: Insecta
- Order: Coleoptera
- Suborder: Polyphaga
- Infraorder: Cucujiformia
- Family: Cerylonidae
- Subfamily: Ceryloninae
- Genus: Cerylon; Latreille, 1802

= Cerylon =

Genus of beetles

Cerylon is a genus of minute bark beetles in the family Cerylonidae. About 11 species in Cerylon have been described.

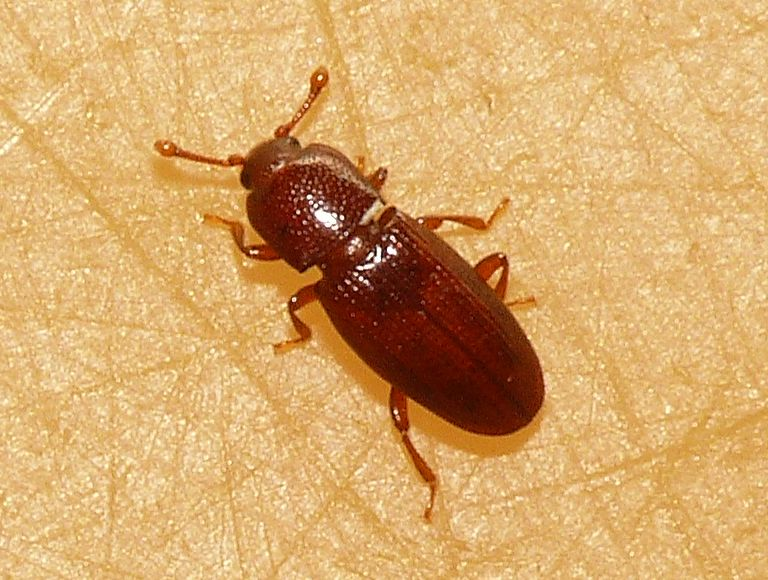
Cerylon ferrugineum

== Species ==
- Cerylon bescidicum Reitter, 1911^{g}
- Cerylon californicum Casey, 1890^{i c g}
- Cerylon castaneum Say, 1826^{i c g b}
- Cerylon conditum Lawrence and Stephan, 1975^{i c g}
- Cerylon deplanatum Gyllenhal, 1827^{g}
- Cerylon distans Lawrence and Stephan, 1975^{i c g}
- Cerylon fagi Brisout de Barneville, 1867^{g}
- Cerylon ferrugineum Stephens, 1830^{g}
- Cerylon hazara Slipinski, 1988
- Cerylon histeroides (Fabricius, 1792)
- Cerylon impressum Erichson, 1845^{g}
- Cerylon testaceum Fairmaire, 1850^{g}
- Cerylon unicolor (Ziegler, 1845)^{i c g b}

Data sources: i = ITIS, c = Catalogue of Life, g = GBIF, b = Bugguide.net
