= Nkolbissonia =

Scientific classification
- Domain: Eukaryota
- Kingdom: Animalia
- Phylum: Arthropoda
- Class: Insecta
- Order: Coleoptera
- Suborder: Polyphaga
- Infraorder: Cucujiformia
- Family: Cerylonidae
- Genus: Nkolbissonia; Dajoz, 1978

Genus of insects

Nkolbissonia is a genus of beetles belonging to the family Cerylonidae.

Species:

- Nkolbissonia mirei Dajoz, 1978
