= Mychocerinus =

Scientific classification
- Kingdom: Animalia
- Phylum: Arthropoda
- Clade: Pancrustacea
- Class: Insecta
- Order: Coleoptera
- Suborder: Polyphaga
- Infraorder: Cucujiformia
- Family: Murmidiidae
- Genus: Mychocerinus; Slipinski, 1990

Genus of beetles

Mychocerinus is a genus of beetles in the family Murmidiidae. There are at least two described species in Mychocerinus.

== Species ==
These two species belong to the genus Mychocerinus:

- Mychocerinus arizonensis (Lawrence & Stephan, 1975)
- Mychocerinus depressus (LeConte, 1866)
