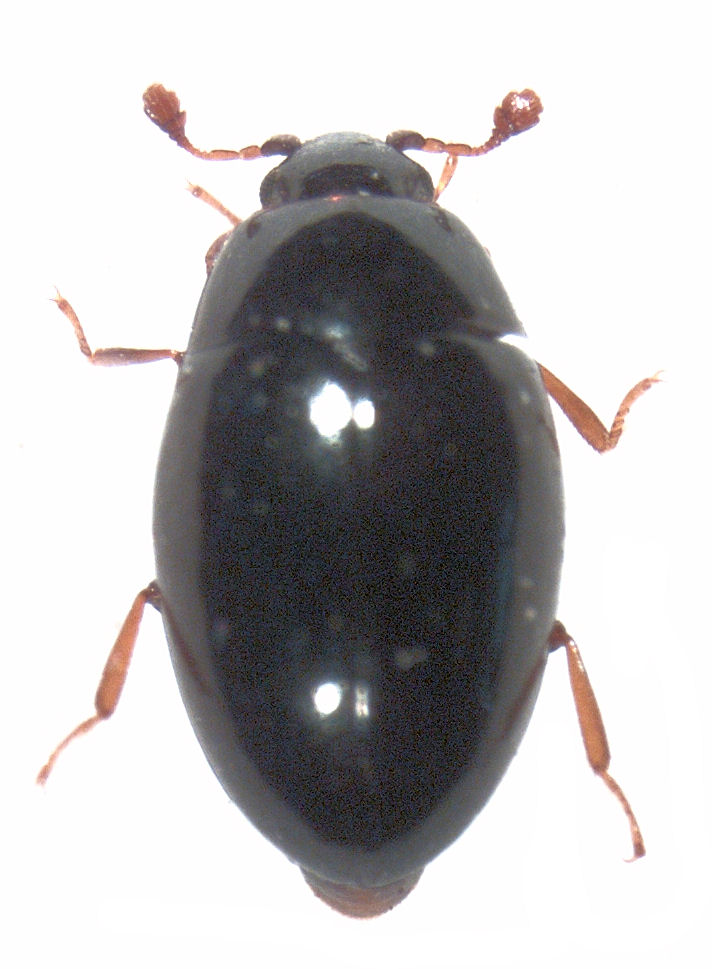
- Hypodacnella rubripes

Scientific classification
- Kingdom: Animalia
- Phylum: Arthropoda
- Clade: Pancrustacea
- Class: Insecta
- Order: Coleoptera
- Suborder: Polyphaga
- Infraorder: Cucujiformia
- Superfamily: Coccinelloidea
- Family: Euxestidae; Grouvelle, 1908

Synonyms
- Euxestinae Grouvelle, 1908

= Euxestidae =

Family of beetles

Euxestidae, also known as well-polished beetles due to their shiny exoskeleton, are a beetle family within superfamily Coccinelloidea of infraorder Cucujiformia. They were long included in the coccinelloid family Cerylonidae (minute bark beetles) or the more distantly related cucujiforms Erotylidae (pleasing fungus beetles) or the then-distinct family Colydiidae (cylindrical bark beetles, now in family Zopheridae) as a subfamily Euxestinae, before becoming recognized as a distinct family from 2015 onwards. Euxestidae contain around 70 extant species in 11 genera, distributed primarily in the tropical and subtropical regions of Afro-Eurasia.

These beetles are found in decomposing wood, leaf litter, ant nests, and the fungus gardens of termites. All species are presumed to be mycophagous.

== Description ==
Adults
Well-polished beetles are small, even tiny animals; the body of adults is oval and more or less elongated, most conspicuously so in Metacerylon. Many of these beetles have characteristic antennae, with a rounded "club" at the tip which is formed from very compact segments, hardly individually recognizable anymore; the end segments of the "club" are reduced in size. In others, the antenna "clubs" are more loosely structured, with clearly distinct segments. Grooves on the head run from the antenna insertions at least to the midpoint of the compound eyes; the corpotentorium of the head capsule has an extension in the middle. On the abdomen, there are seven pairs of spiracles; the first ventrite protrudes broadly forward between the hindleg attachments and ends in a blunt or angular tip. The male genitalia of Euxestidae are characterized by an asymmetrical phallobase, indistinct parameres, and a long and well-sclerotzied aedeagus. The parchment-like hindwings feature an anal lobe. The attachment points of the mid-leg coxae are fully closed. On the forelegs, the tibiae bear bristles, as well as spurs or spines; the tarsal formula is 4-4-4.

Larvae
Larvae of well-polished beetles have a prognathous head; in some species they are blind, while in others they have two pairs of stemmata. The larval antennae are comparatively long, and feature a sensory organ that exceeds the last antenna segment in length. As for the mouthparts, the labrum is free, while the mandibles have an additional ventral process and well-developed molar areas for chewing, but lack a prostheca. The back of thorax and abdomen is not strongly sclerotized, but usually bears small nodules which give it a grainy texture. On the ninth tergum of the abdomen, there is a pair of simple urogomphi.

== Genera ==
- Bradycycloxenus Arrow, 1926
- Cycloxenus Arrow, 1925
- Euxestoxenus Arrow, 1925
- Euxestus Wollaston, 1858
- Globoeuxestus Ślipiński (formerly in Euxestus)
- Hypodacne LeConte, 1875
- Hypodacnella Slipinski, 1988 (formerly in Euxestus)
- Metacerylon Grouvelle, 1906
- Metaxestus Ślipiński
- Protoxestus Sen Gupta & Crowson, 1973
- Pseudodacne Crotch
