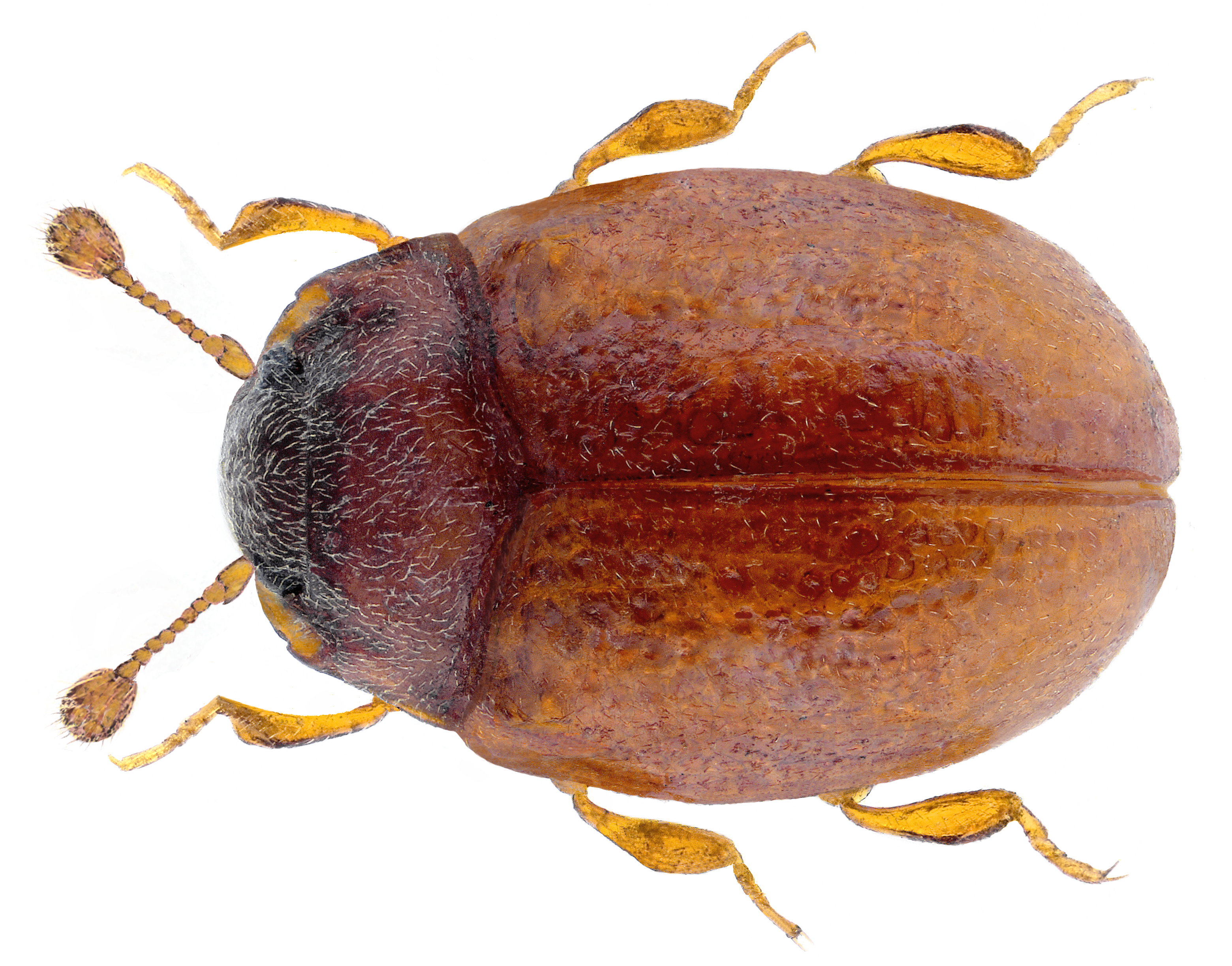
- Murmidius ovalis

Scientific classification
- Kingdom: Animalia
- Phylum: Arthropoda
- Clade: Pancrustacea
- Class: Insecta
- Order: Coleoptera
- Suborder: Polyphaga
- Infraorder: Cucujiformia
- Superfamily: Coccinelloidea
- Family: Murmidiidae; Jacquelin du Val, 1858

Genera
- See text

= Murmidiidae =

Family of beetles

Murmidiidae is a family of beetles in the superfamily Coccinelloidea, formerly included within the family Cerylonidae. The family contains thirty-four described species in four genera, which are found worldwide. They are typically found under the bark of recently dead trees, and are thought to be mycophagous. The species Murmidius ovalis, found worldwide, is noted as a pest of stored food.

== Genera ==
- Botrodus Casey, 1890
- Murmidiella Jałoszyński & Ślipiński, 2022
- Murmidius Leach, 1822
- Mychocerinus Ślipiński, 1990
