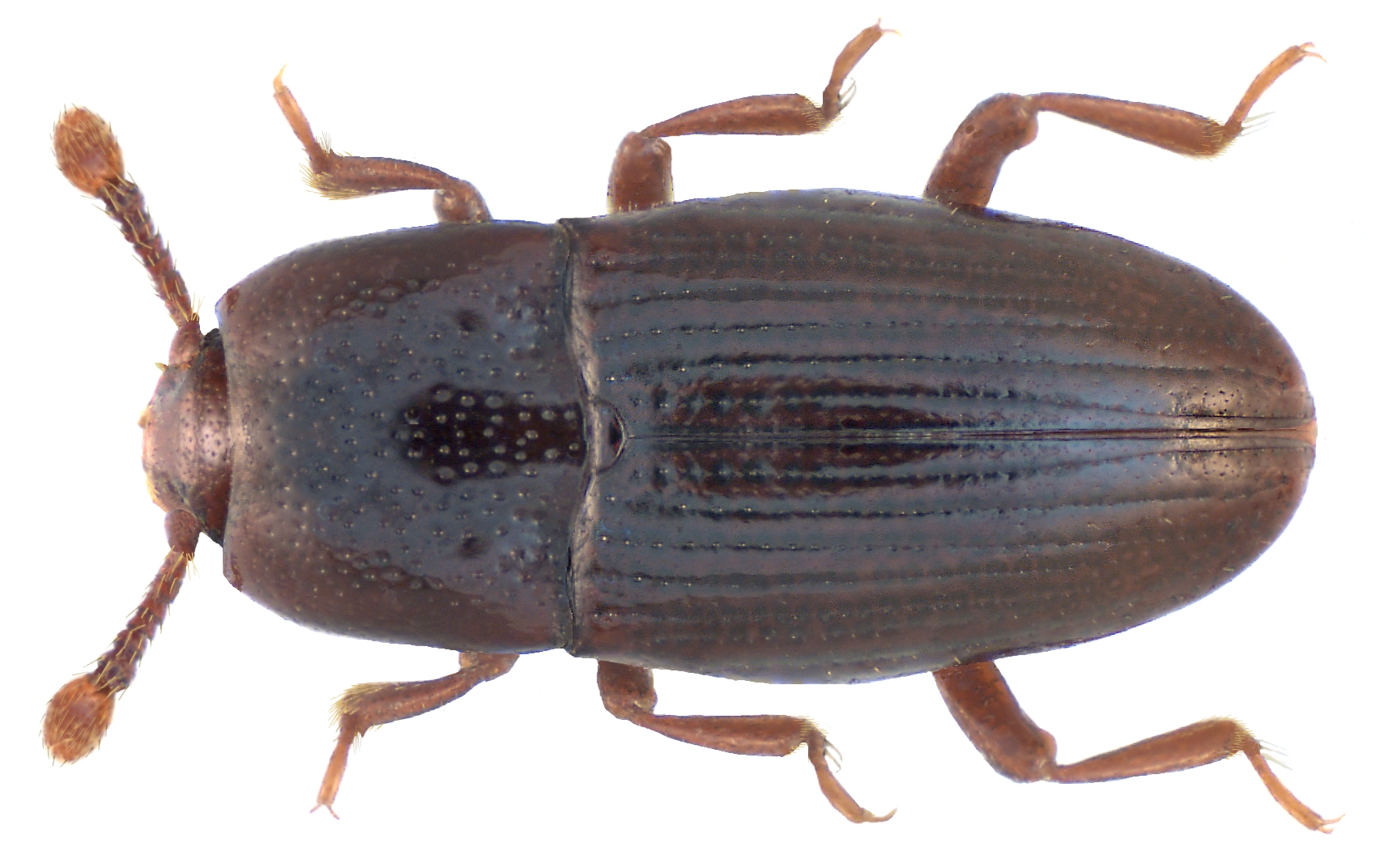
- Cerylon fagi

Scientific classification
- Kingdom: Animalia
- Phylum: Arthropoda
- Clade: Pancrustacea
- Class: Insecta
- Order: Coleoptera
- Suborder: Polyphaga
- Infraorder: Cucujiformia
- Superfamily: Coccinelloidea
- Family: Cerylonidae; Billberg, 1820

Subfamilies
- Ceryloninae; Loeblioryloninae; Ostomopsinae

Synonyms
- Aculagnathidae Oke, 1932; Dolosidae; Pleosomidae; Ploeosomidae

= Cerylonidae =

Cerylonidae Temporal range: Eocene–Recent

Family of beetles

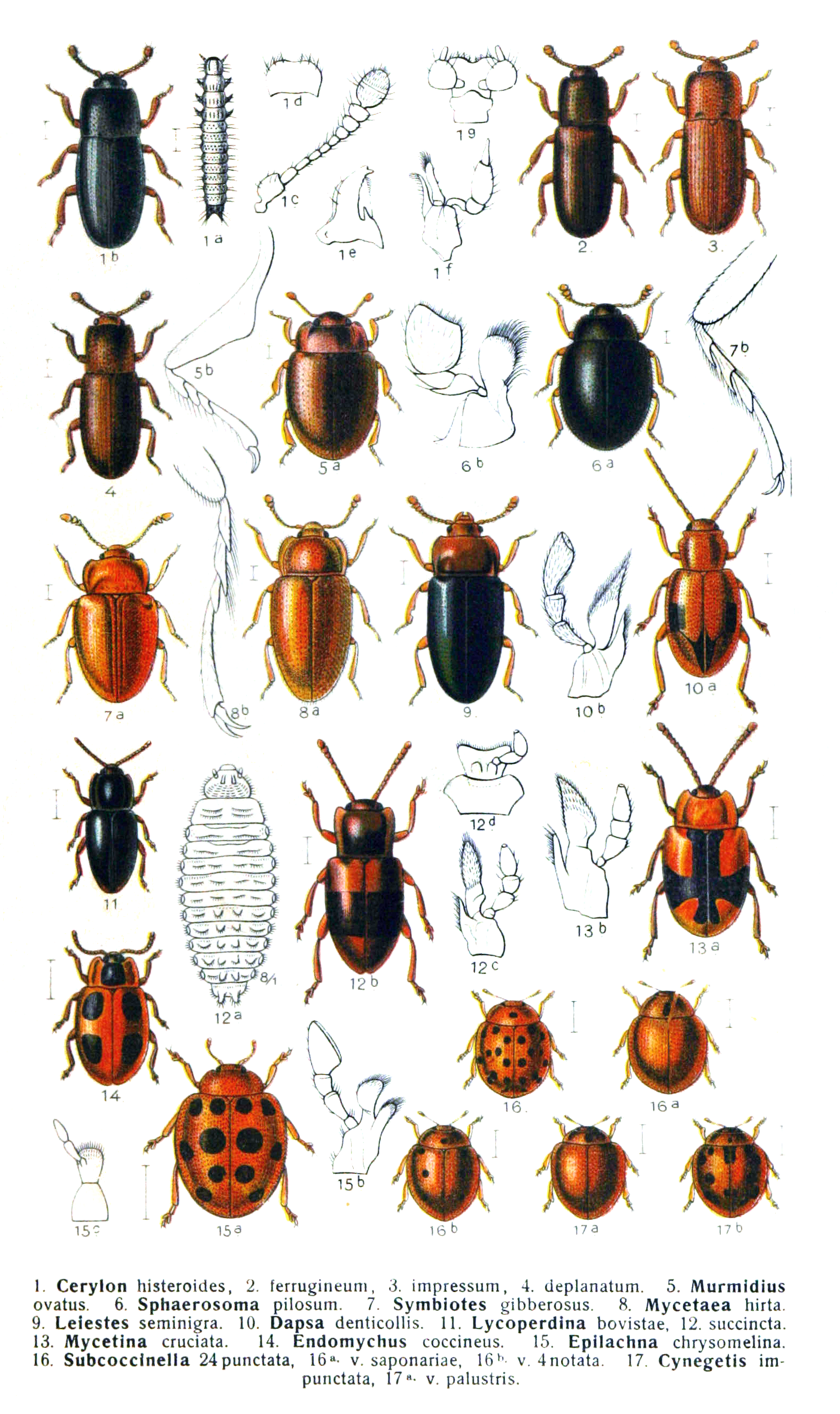
Cerylon figures 1-4

Cerylonidae is a family of beetles in the superfamily Coccinelloidea. They are small to tiny (0.8–3 mm (0.031–0.118 in)), smooth, shiny, hairless beetles, only lightly punctured. The roughly 450 species worldwide are placed in 50 or so genera, mostly tropical and subtropical. They are most common under the bark of dead trees, but can also occur in compost and other decaying plant material. Little is known specifically about their biology, but they are thought to be either predators that feed on other small animals or fungus-feeders.

== Systematics ==
Their taxonomy is complex. The "cerylonid series" is a cluster of highly derived former Cucujoidea families considered by recent authorities to comprise a separate superfamily Coccinelloidea. Several of these families (Alexiidae, Euxestidae, Murmidiidae) used to be included within the Cerylonidae.

The Cerylonidae in their current circumscription comprise the subfamilies Ceryloninae, Loeblioryloninae, and Ostomopsinae sensu Ślipiński (1990), with around 344 species in 38 genera:

- Acautomus Heinze, 1944 (2 spp.)^{s g}
- Afrorylon Slipinski, 1980 (12 spp.)^{s g}
- Angolon Dajoz, 1977 (2 spp.)^{s g}
- Australiorylon Slipinski, 1988 (4 spp.)^{s g}
- Axiocerylon Grouvelle, 1918 (31 spp.)^{s g}
- Belingaia Dajoz, 1974 (1 sp.)^{s}
- Cautomus Sharp, 1885 (22 spp.)^{s g}
- Cerylon Latreille, 1802 (12 spp.)^{s i c g b}
- Clavicerylon Ślipiński, 1990 (1 sp.)^{s g}
- Coccilon Hinton, 1942 (1 sp.)^{s g}
- Ectomicrus Sharp, 1885 (4 spp.)^{s g}
- Ellipsorylon Ślipiński, 1990 (1 sp.)^{s g}
- Glomerylon Ślipiński, 1990 (1 sp.)^{s g}
- Glyptolopus Erichson, 1845 (5 spp.)^{s g}
- Gyreleon Hinton, 1942 (4 spp.)^{s g}
- Ivieus Slipinski, 1990 (1 sp.)^{s g}
- Johnlawrencella Ślipiński, 2016 (1 sp.)^{g}
- Lapethinus Ślipiński, 1984 (3 spp.)^{s g}
- Loebliorylon Slipinski, 1990 (1 sp.)^{s i c g}
- Mychocerus Erichson, 1845 (45 spp.)^{s i c g b}
- Neolapethus Sen Gupta & Pal, 1985 (1 sp.)^{s g}
- Nkolbissonia Dajoz, 1978 (1 sp.)^{s g}
- Orientrylon Ślipiński, 1990 (2 spp.)^{s g}
- Oroussetia Dajoz, 1981 (6 spp.)^{s g}
- Ostomopsis Scott, 1922 (1 sp.)^{s i c g b}
- Pachylon Sharp, 1885 (2 spp.)^{s g}
- Pakalukia Ślipiński, 1990 (1 sp.)^{s g}
- Paracerylon Ślipiński, 1990 (6 spp.)^{s g}
- Pathelus Dajoz, 1974 (8 spp.)^{s g}
- Philothermopsis Heinze, 1944 (37 spp.)^{s g}
- Philothermus Aubé, 1843 (95 spp.)^{s i c g b}
- Ploeosoma Wollaston, 1854 (1 sp.)^{s g}
- Pseudocerylon Grouvelle, 1897 (7 spp.)^{s g}
- Pseudolapethus Ślipiński, 1984 (1 sp.)^{s g}
- Rostrorylon Ślipiński, 1990 (1 sp.)^{s g}
- Spinocerylon Ślipiński, 1988 (3 spp.)^{s g}
- Suakokoia Sen Gupta & Crowson, 1973 (7 spp.)^{s g}
- Thyroderus Sharp, 1885 (9 spp.)^{s g}

Data sources: s = Ślipiński (1990), i = ITIS, c = Catalogue of Life, g = GBIF, b = Bugguide.net

=== Extinct genera ===
- †Protostomopsis Bukejs et al. 2021; Baltic amber, Eocene
