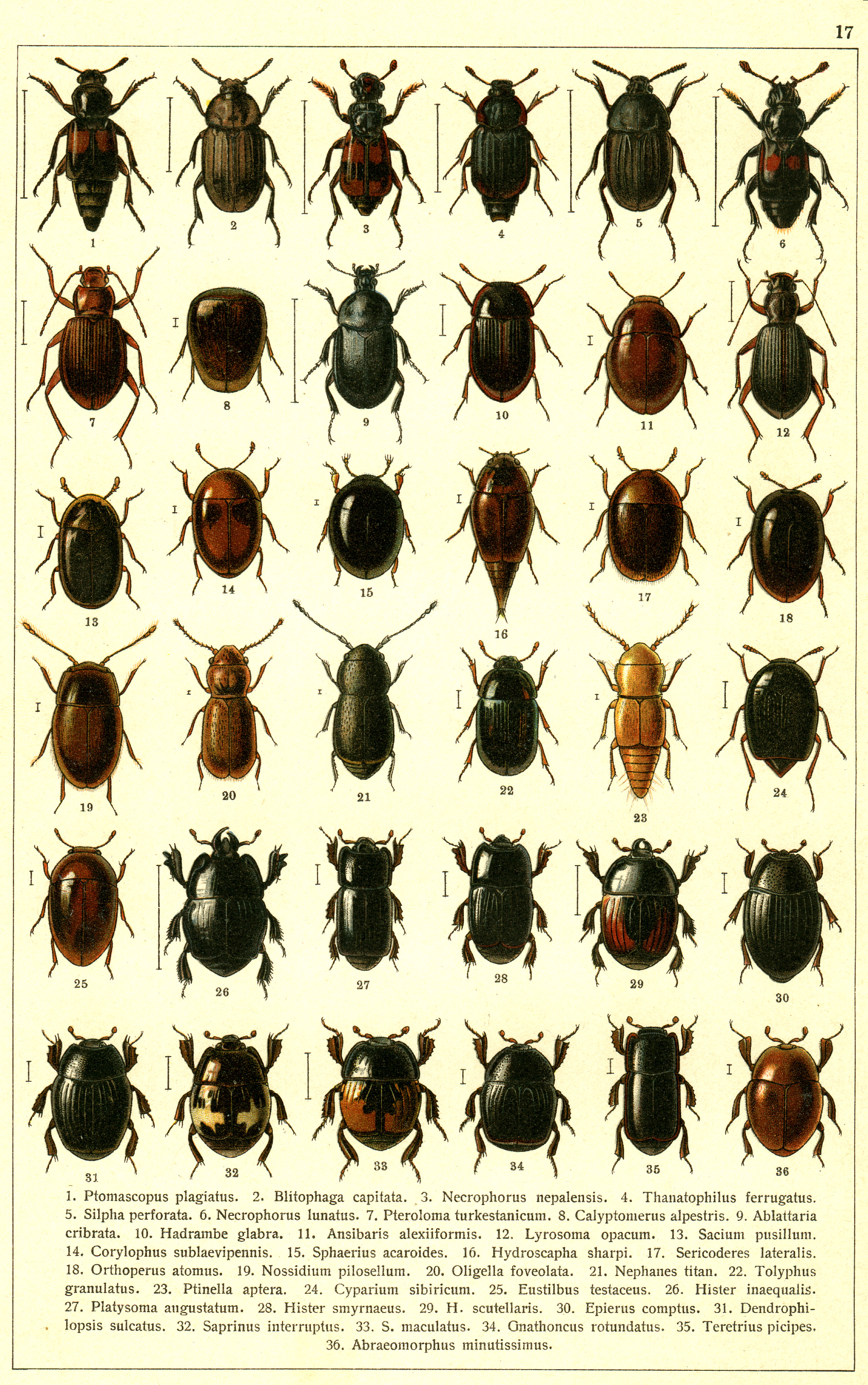
- Corylophus sublaevipennis no. 14

Scientific classification
- Kingdom: Animalia
- Phylum: Arthropoda
- Class: Insecta
- Order: Coleoptera
- Suborder: Polyphaga
- Infraorder: Cucujiformia
- Family: Corylophidae
- Genus: Corylophus
- Species: C. sublaevipennis

Binomial name
- Corylophus sublaevipennis Jacquelin du Val, 1859

= Corylophus sublaevipennis =

Species of beetle

Corylophus sublaevipennis is a species of beetle in family Corylophidae. It is found in the Palearctic.
