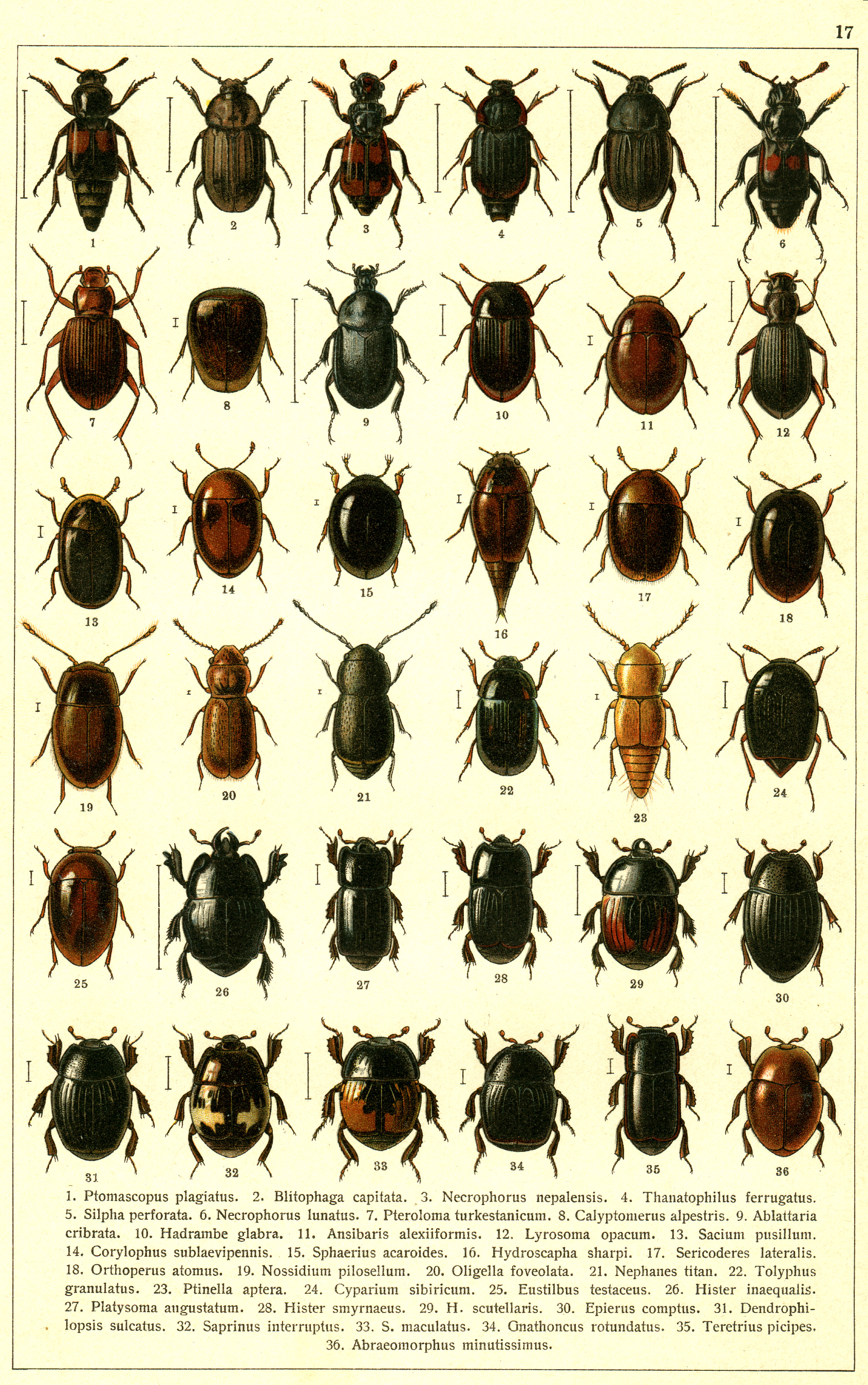
- Orthoperus atomus no. 18

Scientific classification
- Kingdom: Animalia
- Phylum: Arthropoda
- Clade: Pancrustacea
- Class: Insecta
- Order: Coleoptera
- Suborder: Polyphaga
- Infraorder: Cucujiformia
- Family: Corylophidae
- Genus: Orthoperus
- Species: O. atomus

Binomial name
- Orthoperus atomus (Gyllenhal, 1808)

= Orthoperus atomus =

Species of beetle

Orthoperus atomus is a species of beetle in family Corylophidae. It is found in the Palearctic.
