= Orthoperus scutellaris =

Scientific classification
- Kingdom: Animalia
- Phylum: Arthropoda
- Class: Insecta
- Order: Coleoptera
- Suborder: Polyphaga
- Infraorder: Cucujiformia
- Family: Corylophidae
- Genus: Orthoperus
- Species: O. scutellaris

Binomial name
- Orthoperus scutellaris LeConte, 1878

Synonyms
- Sphaerius scutellaris (LeConte, 1878)

Species of beetle

Orthoperus scutellaris is a species of minute hooded beetle in the family Corylophidae. It is found in North America.
