= Rypobius marinus =

Scientific classification
- Domain: Eukaryota
- Kingdom: Animalia
- Phylum: Arthropoda
- Class: Insecta
- Order: Coleoptera
- Suborder: Polyphaga
- Infraorder: Cucujiformia
- Family: Corylophidae
- Genus: Rypobius
- Species: R. marinus

Binomial name
- Rypobius marinus LeConte, 1852

Species of beetle

Rypobius marinus is a species of minute hooded beetle in the family Corylophidae. It is found in North America.
