= Clypastraea fasciata =

Scientific classification
- Kingdom: Animalia
- Phylum: Arthropoda
- Class: Insecta
- Order: Coleoptera
- Suborder: Polyphaga
- Infraorder: Cucujiformia
- Family: Corylophidae
- Genus: Clypastraea
- Species: C. fasciata

Binomial name
- Clypastraea fasciata (Say, 1827)

Species of beetle

Clypastraea fasciata is a species of minute hooded beetle in the family Corylophidae. It is found in North America.
