= Arthrolips decolor =

Scientific classification
- Domain: Eukaryota
- Kingdom: Animalia
- Phylum: Arthropoda
- Class: Insecta
- Order: Coleoptera
- Suborder: Polyphaga
- Infraorder: Cucujiformia
- Family: Corylophidae
- Genus: Arthrolips
- Species: A. decolor

Binomial name
- Arthrolips decolor (LeConte, 1852)

Synonyms
- Sacium californicum Matthews, 1899; Sacium decolor LeConte, 1852

Species of beetle

Arthrolips decolor is a species of minute hooded beetle in the family Corylophidae. It is found in North America.
