= Clypastraea lugubris =

Scientific classification
- Kingdom: Animalia
- Phylum: Arthropoda
- Class: Insecta
- Order: Coleoptera
- Suborder: Polyphaga
- Infraorder: Cucujiformia
- Family: Corylophidae
- Genus: Clypastraea
- Species: C. lugubris

Binomial name
- Clypastraea lugubris (LeConte, 1852)

Synonyms
- Sacium lugubre LeConte, 1852

Species of beetle

Clypastraea lugubris is a species of minute hooded beetle in the family Corylophidae. It is found in North America.
