= Aenigmaticum californicum =

Scientific classification
- Kingdom: Animalia
- Phylum: Arthropoda
- Class: Insecta
- Order: Coleoptera
- Suborder: Polyphaga
- Infraorder: Cucujiformia
- Family: Corylophidae
- Genus: Aenigmaticum
- Species: A. californicum

Binomial name
- Aenigmaticum californicum Casey, 1889

Species of beetle

Aenigmaticum californicum is a species of minute hooded beetle in the family Corylophidae. It is found in North America.
