= Holopsis marginicollis =

Scientific classification
- Kingdom: Animalia
- Phylum: Arthropoda
- Class: Insecta
- Order: Coleoptera
- Suborder: Polyphaga
- Infraorder: Cucujiformia
- Family: Corylophidae
- Tribe: Peltinodini
- Genus: Holopsis
- Species: H. marginicollis

Binomial name
- Holopsis marginicollis (LeConte, 1852)

Synonyms
- Corylophodes marginicollis (LeConte, 1852); Corylophus marginicollis LeConte, 1852

Species of beetles

Holopsis marginicollis is a species of minute hooded beetle in the family Corylophidae, found in eastern North America. It lives in leaf litter and on vegetation.
