= Clypastrea =

Scientific classification
- Domain: Eukaryota
- Kingdom: Animalia
- Phylum: Arthropoda
- Class: Insecta
- Order: Coleoptera
- Suborder: Polyphaga
- Infraorder: Cucujiformia
- Family: Corylophidae
- Tribe: Parmulini
- Genus: Clypastrea; Haldeman, 1842

Synonyms
- Aposacium Paulian, 1950; Aspidocha Gistel, 1848; Parmulus Gundlach, 1854; Sacinops Paulian, 1950; Saucium LeConte, 1852

Genus of beetles

Clypastrea is a genus of beetles belonging to the family Corylophidae.

The genus was first described by Haldeman in 1842.

The genus has cosmopolitan distribution.

Species include:

- Clypastrea maderae (Kraatz, 1869)
- Clypastrea orientalis (Reitter, 1877)
- Clypastrea palmi Bowestead, 1999
- Clypastrea reitteri Bowestead, 1999
