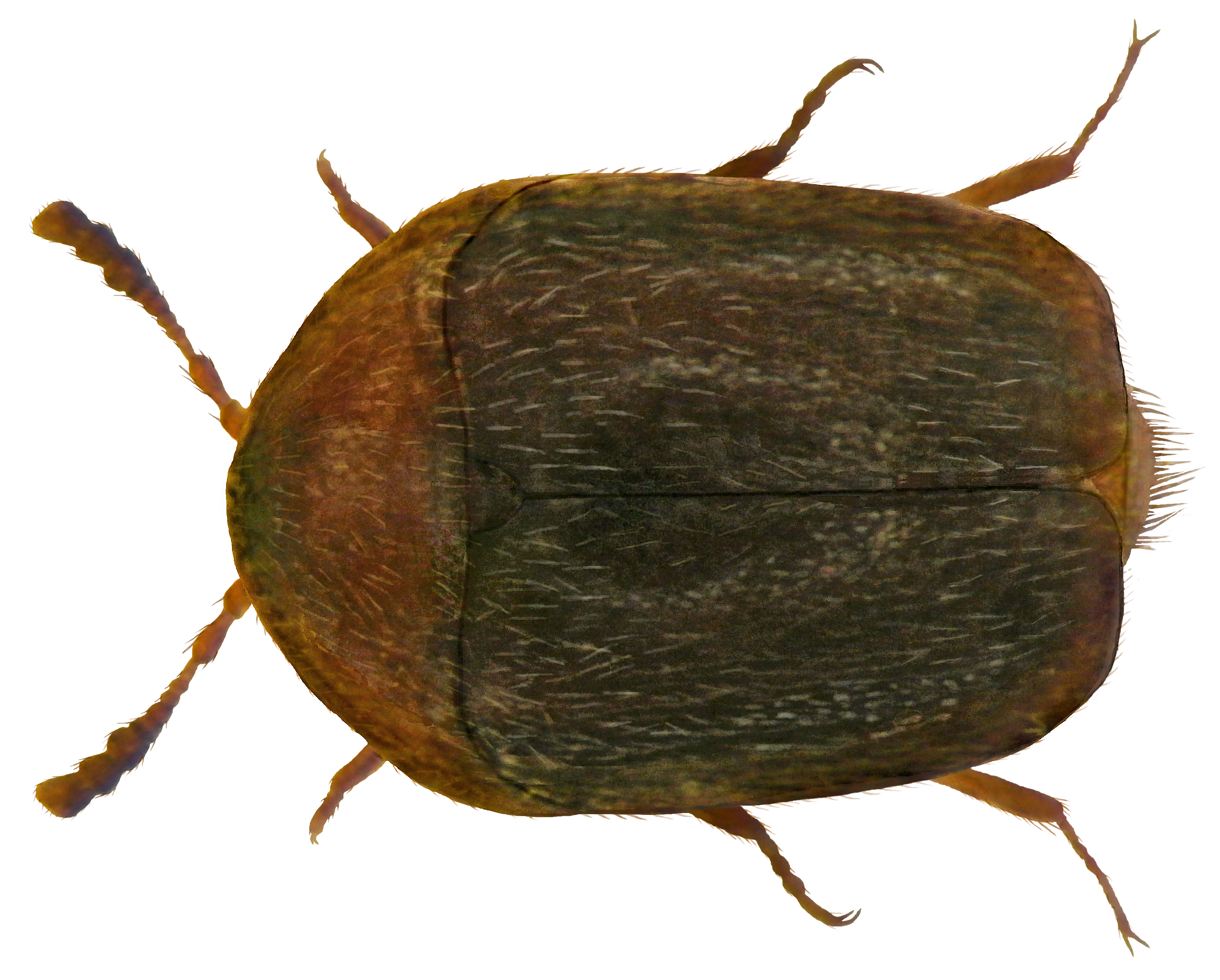
- Sericoderus lateralis

Scientific classification
- Kingdom: Animalia
- Phylum: Arthropoda
- Class: Insecta
- Order: Coleoptera
- Suborder: Polyphaga
- Infraorder: Cucujiformia
- Family: Corylophidae
- Genus: Sericoderus; Stephens, 1829

Type species
- Sericoderus thoracicus Gyllenhal, 1827

Synonyms
- Anisomeristes Matthews, 1886

= Sericoderus =

Genus of beetles

Sericoderus is a genus of minute hooded beetles in the family Corylophidae. There are about 12 described species in Sericoderus.

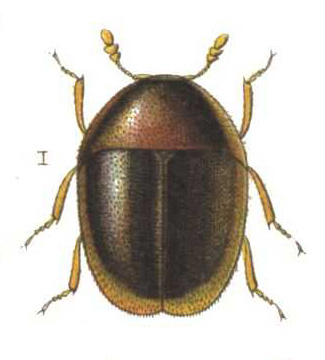
Sericoderus lateralis

== Species ==
These 12 species belong to the genus Sericoderus:

- Anisomeristes castaneus (Reitter, 1877)
- Sericoderus basalis Sharp in Blackburn & Sharp, 1885
- Sericoderus brevicornis Matthews, 1890
- Sericoderus debilis Casey, 1900
- Sericoderus flavidus LeConte, 1852
- Sericoderus lateralis (Gyllenhal, 1827)
- Sericoderus minutus Matthews, 1894
- Sericoderus obscurus LeConte, 1852
- Sericoderus pecirkanus Reitter, 1908
- Sericoderus pubipennis Sharp in Blackburn & Sharp, 1885
- Sericoderus quadratus Casey, 1900
- Sericoderus subtilis LeConte, 1852
