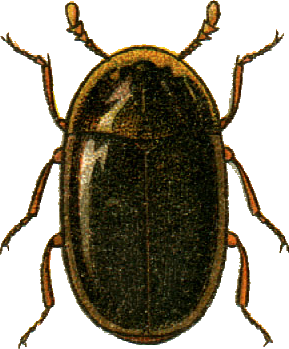
- Clypastraea pusilla

Scientific classification
- Kingdom: Animalia
- Phylum: Arthropoda
- Class: Insecta
- Order: Coleoptera
- Suborder: Polyphaga
- Infraorder: Cucujiformia
- Family: Corylophidae
- Tribe: Parmulini
- Genus: Clypastraea; Haldeman, 1842

Synonyms
- Clypeastodes Casey, 1900; Molamba Casey, 1900; Sacium LeConte, 1852

= Clypastraea =

Genus of beetles

Clypastraea is a genus of minute hooded beetles in the family Corylophidae. There are more than 20 described species in Clypastraea.

== Species ==
These 23 species belong to the genus Clypastraea:

- Clypastraea amabilis (LeConte, 1852)
- Clypastraea angusticolle (Scott, 1908)
- Clypastraea balteata (Matthews, 1899)
- Clypastraea biguttata (LeConte, 1879)
- Clypastraea brunnea (C.Brisout de Barneville, 1863)
- Clypastraea decora (Casey, 1900)
- Clypastraea fasciata (Say, 1827)
- Clypastraea fuscum Harold, 1875
- Clypastraea lepida (LeConte, 1852)
- Clypastraea lugubris (LeConte, 1852)
- Clypastraea lunata (LeConte, 1852)
- Clypastraea montana (Casey, 1900)
- Clypastraea nigra (Casey, 1900)
- Clypastraea obesa (Casey, 1900)
- Clypastraea obscura (LeConte, 1852)
- Clypastraea ornata (Casey, 1900)
- Clypastraea palmi Bowestead, 1999
- Clypastraea parvula (Casey, 1900)
- Clypastraea primainterpares Alekseev, 2016
- Clypastraea pusilla (Gyllenhal, 1810)
- Clypastraea reitteri Bowestead, 1999
- Clypastraea specularis (Casey, 1900)
- Clypastraea sp-one
