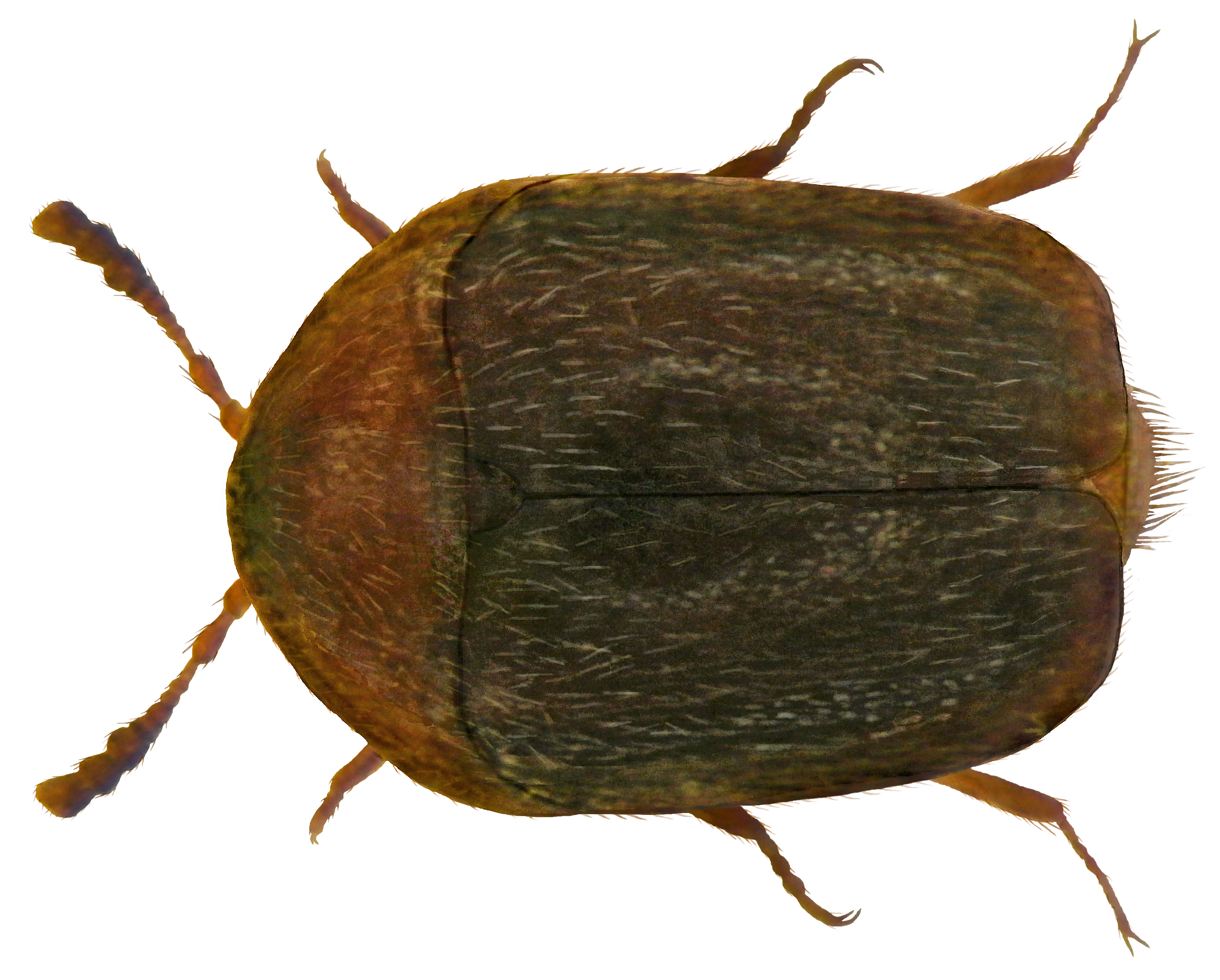

Scientific classification
- Kingdom: Animalia
- Phylum: Arthropoda
- Class: Insecta
- Order: Coleoptera
- Suborder: Polyphaga
- Infraorder: Cucujiformia
- Family: Corylophidae
- Genus: Sericoderus
- Species: S. lateralis

Binomial name
- Sericoderus lateralis (Gyllenhal, 1827)

= Sericoderus lateralis =

Species of beetle

Sericoderus lateralis is a species of minute hooded beetle in the family Corylophidae. It is found in Africa, Australia, Europe and Northern Asia (excluding China), North America, and Southern Asia.

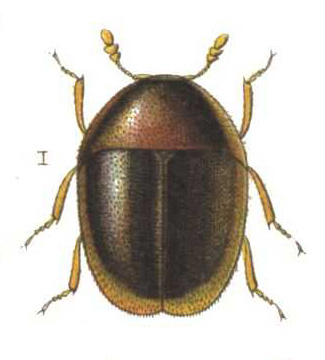
