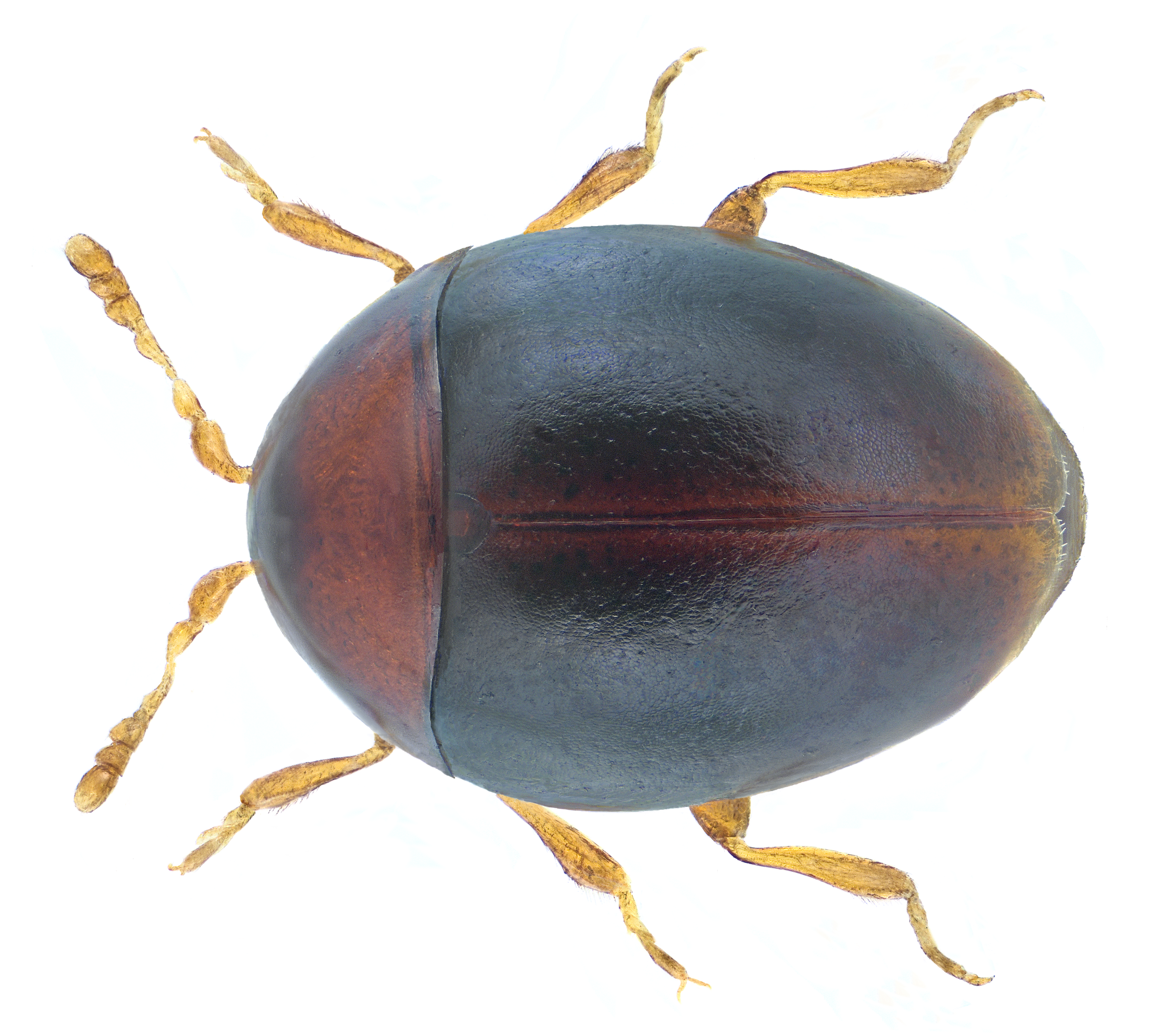
- Rypobius praetermissus

Scientific classification
- Kingdom: Animalia
- Phylum: Arthropoda
- Class: Insecta
- Order: Coleoptera
- Suborder: Polyphaga
- Infraorder: Cucujiformia
- Family: Corylophidae
- Tribe: Rypobiini; Paulian, 1950

Synonyms
- Gloeosomatini Bowestead, 1999

= Rypobiini =

Tribe of beetles

Rypobiini is a tribe of minute hooded beetles in the family Corylophidae. There are at least 2 genera and about 14 described species in Rypobiini.

== Genera ==
These two genera belong to the tribe Rypobiini:

- Gloeosoma Wollaston, 1854
- Rypobius LeConte, 1852
