= Aenigmaticum =

Scientific classification
- Domain: Eukaryota
- Kingdom: Animalia
- Phylum: Arthropoda
- Class: Insecta
- Order: Coleoptera
- Suborder: Polyphaga
- Infraorder: Cucujiformia
- Family: Corylophidae
- Genus: Aenigmaticum; Matthews, 1888

Genus of beetles

Aenigmaticum is a genus of minute hooded beetles in the family Corylophidae. There are about five described species in Aenigmaticum.

== Species ==
These five species belong to the genus Aenigmaticum:

- Aenigmaticum californicum Casey, 1889
- Aenigmaticum elongatum (LeConte, 1878)
- Aenigmaticum mexicanum Pakaluk, 1985
- Aenigmaticum prolatum Pakaluk, 1985
- Aenigmaticum ptilioides Matthews, 1888
