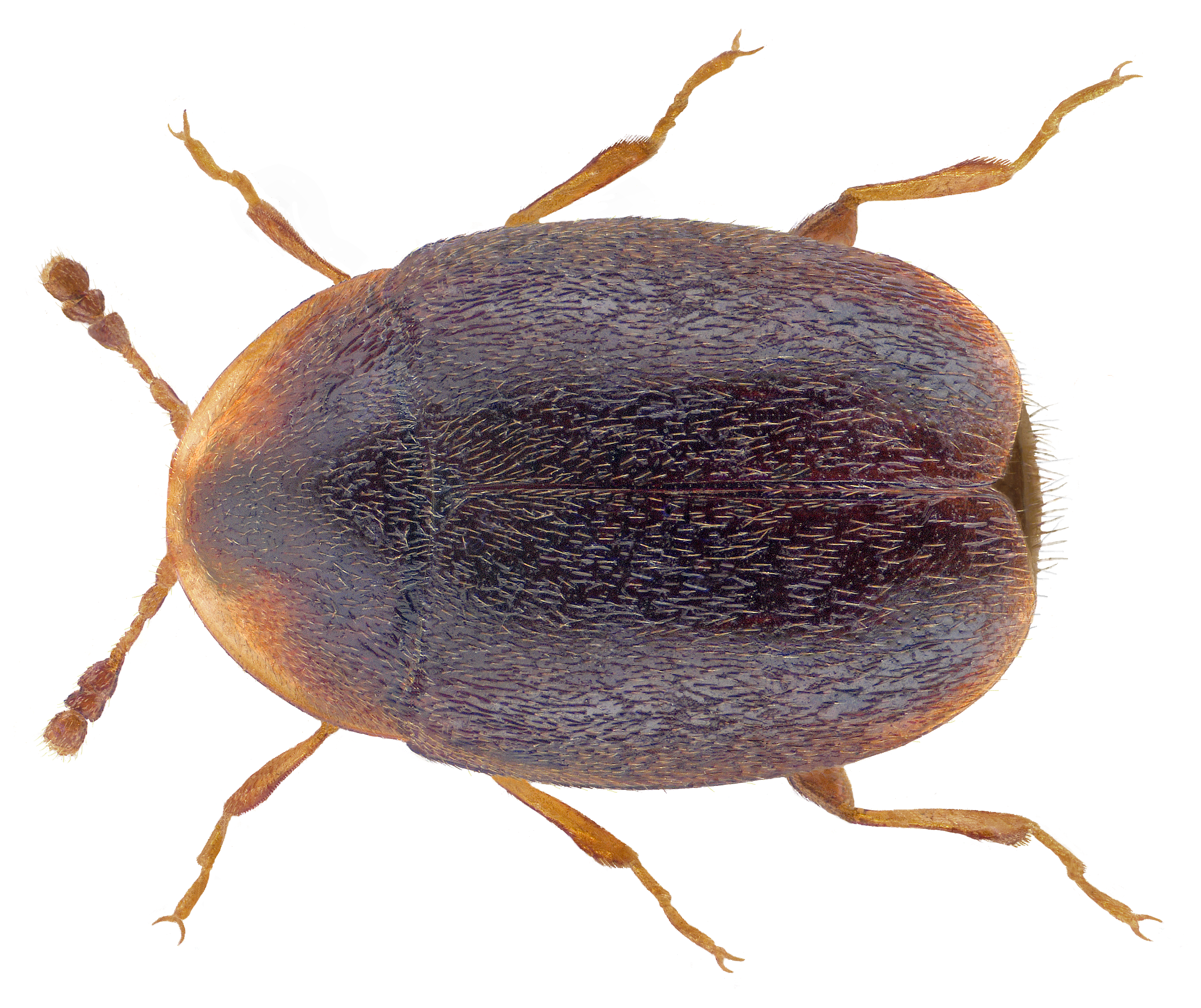
- Arthrolips

Scientific classification
- Kingdom: Animalia
- Phylum: Arthropoda
- Class: Insecta
- Order: Coleoptera
- Suborder: Polyphaga
- Infraorder: Cucujiformia
- Family: Corylophidae
- Tribe: Parmulini; Poey, 1854

= Parmulini =

Tribe of beetles

Parmulini is a tribe of minute hooded beetles in the family Corylophidae. There are at least 2 genera and more than 40 described species in Parmulini.

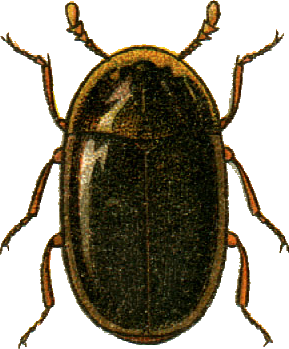
Clypastraea pusilla

== Genera ==
These two genera belong to the tribe Parmulini:

- Arthrolips Wollaston, 1854
- Clypastraea Haldeman, 1842
- Clypastrea Haldeman, 1842
