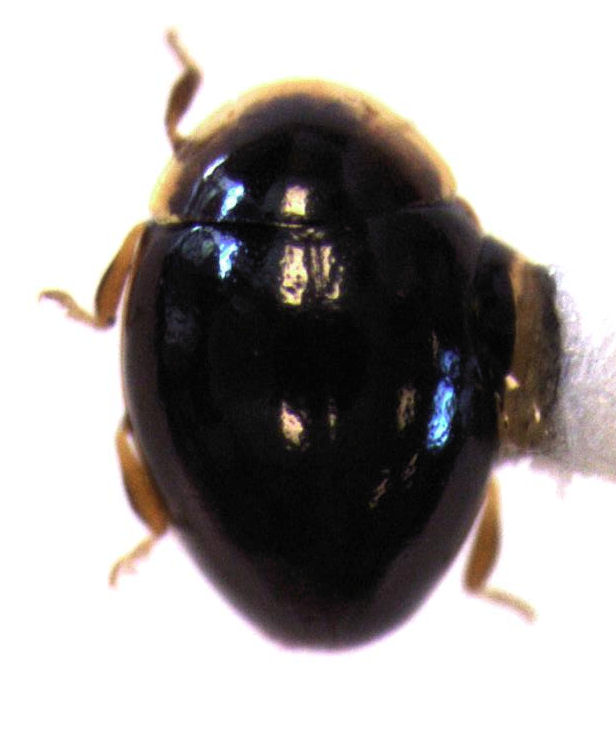
- Holopsis oblonga, New Zealand

Scientific classification
- Kingdom: Animalia
- Phylum: Arthropoda
- Class: Insecta
- Order: Coleoptera
- Suborder: Polyphaga
- Infraorder: Cucujiformia
- Family: Corylophidae
- Tribe: Peltinodini
- Genus: Holopsis; Broun, 1883

Synonyms
- Bathona Casey, 1900; Corylophodes Matthews, 1885; Helopsis Korschefsky, 1931; Peltinodes Paulian, 1950

= Holopsis =

Genus of beetles

Holopsis is a genus of minute hooded beetles in the family Corylophidae. There are more than 30 described species in Holopsis, found throughout the world except Afrotropical and Antarctic regions.

== Species ==
These species belong to the genus Holopsis:

- Holopsis brevicornis (Matthews, 1899) (Australia)
- Holopsis carolinae (Casey, 1900)
- Holopsis convexa (Casey, 1900)
- Holopsis flavoocella (Blatchley, 1927)
- Holopsis giga (de Perrin, 1894)
- Holopsis impunctata (Casey, 1900)
- Holopsis kirejtshuki Bowestead, 2003
- Holopsis kurilensis Bowestead, 2003
- Holopsis lawsoni Broun, 1883
- Holopsis lewisi Bowestead, 2003
- Holopsis marginicollis (LeConte, 1852)
- Holopsis nigella Broun, 1883
- Holopsis oblonga Endrödy-Younga, 1964
- Holopsis pallida Broun, 1883
- Holopsis pellucida (Matthews, 1899)
- Holopsis pictula (Broun, 1893 )
- Holopsis punctipennis (Matthews, 1899)
- Holopsis rotunda (Broun, 1893 )
- Holopsis ryukyuensis Furukawa, 2012
- Holopsis sphaericula (Casey, 1900)
- Holopsis subtropica (Casey, 1900)
- Holopsis suturalis (Sharp, 1885)
- Holopsis virginica (Casey, 1900)
