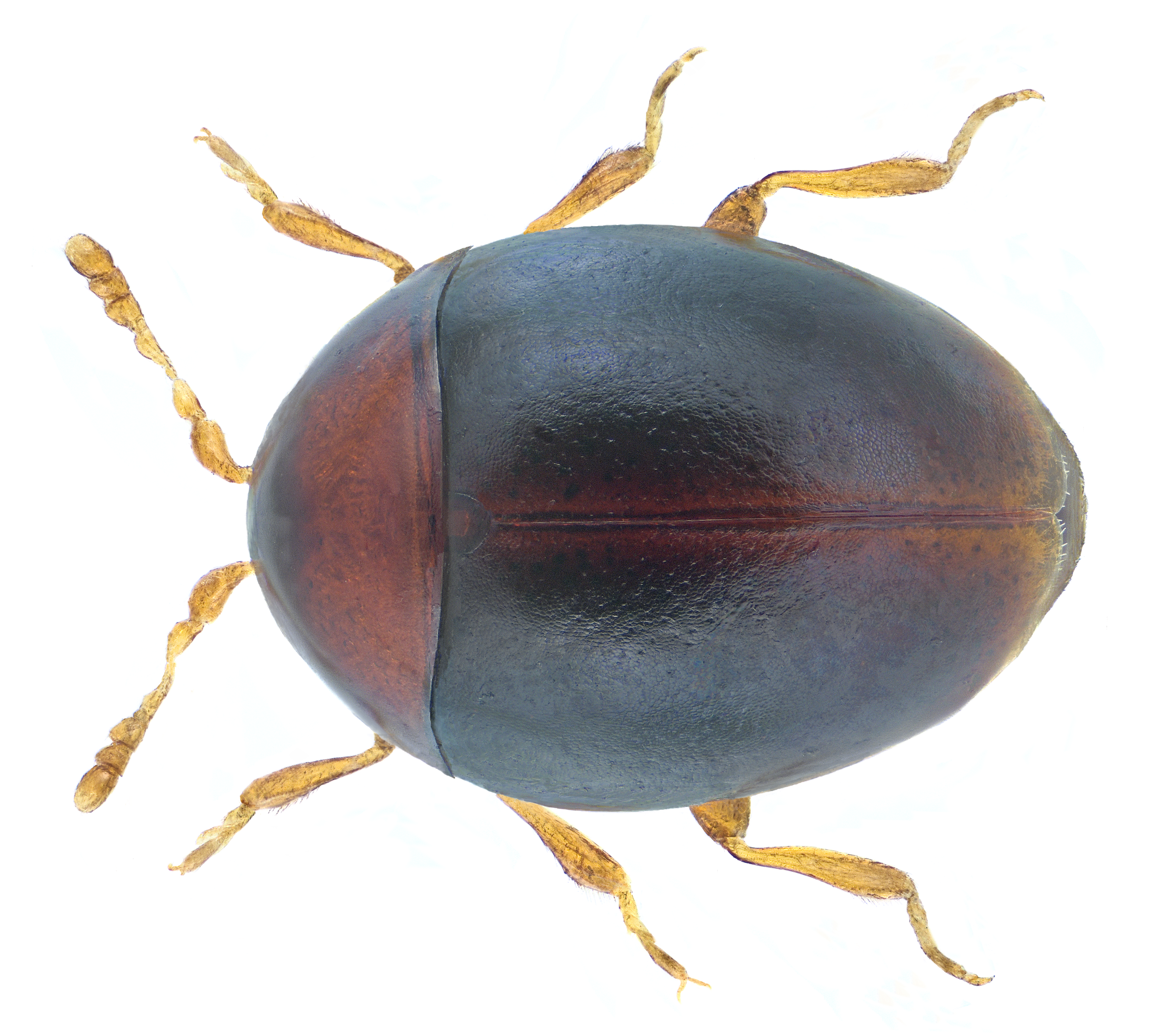
- Rypobius praetermissus

Scientific classification
- Kingdom: Animalia
- Phylum: Arthropoda
- Clade: Pancrustacea
- Class: Insecta
- Order: Coleoptera
- Suborder: Polyphaga
- Infraorder: Cucujiformia
- Family: Corylophidae
- Tribe: Rypobiini
- Genus: Rypobius; LeConte, 1852

= Rypobius =

Genus of beetles

Rypobius is a genus of minute hooded beetles in the family Corylophidae. There are about five described species in Rypobius.

== Species ==
These five species belong to the genus Rypobius:

- Rypobius brevicornis Matthews, 1899
- Rypobius fiorianus (Matthews, 1886)
- Rypobius marinus LeConte, 1852
- Rypobius minutus Casey, 1900
- Rypobius praetermissus Bowestead, 1999
