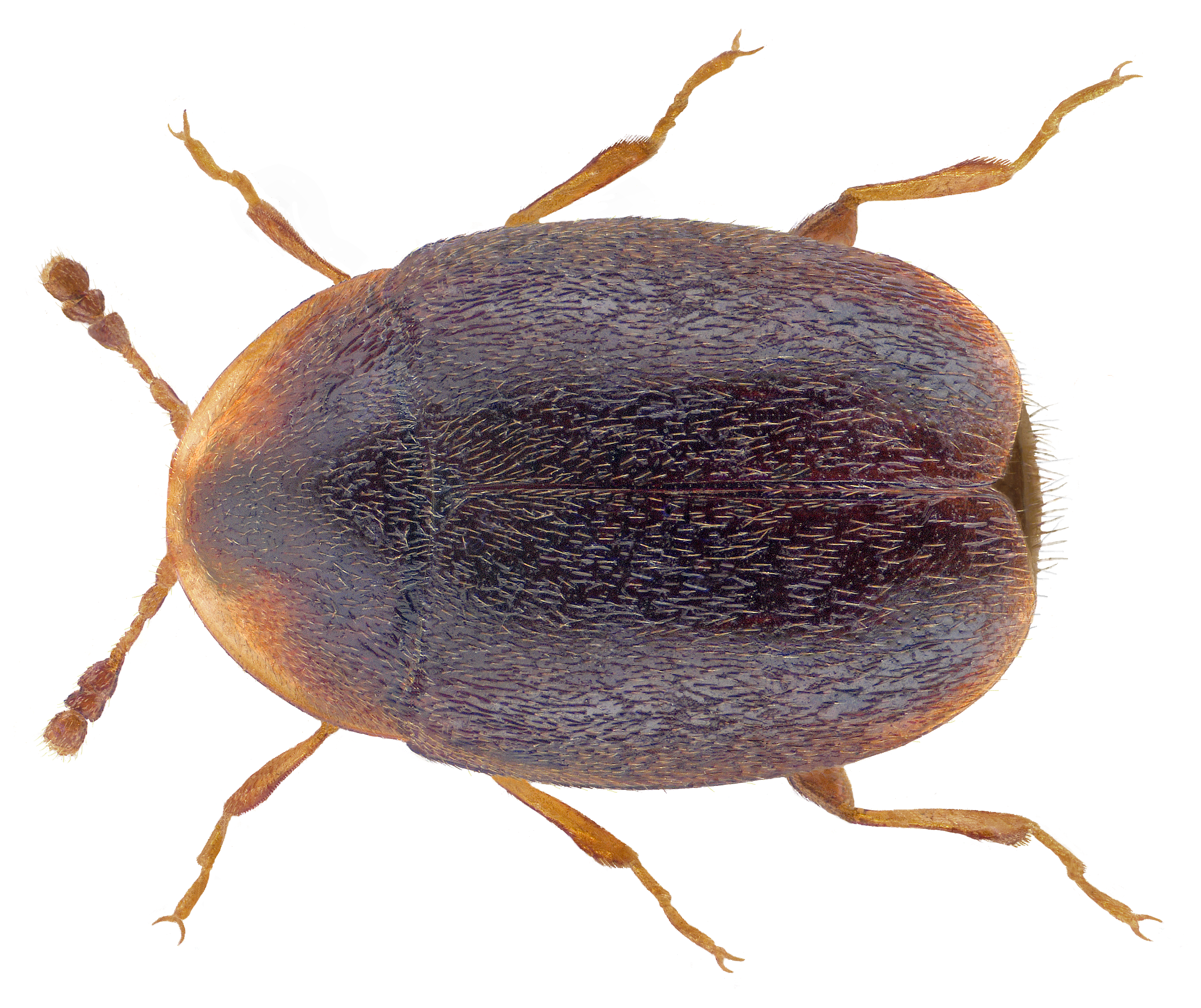

Scientific classification
- Domain: Eukaryota
- Kingdom: Animalia
- Phylum: Arthropoda
- Class: Insecta
- Order: Coleoptera
- Suborder: Polyphaga
- Infraorder: Cucujiformia
- Family: Corylophidae
- Tribe: Parmulini
- Genus: Arthrolips; Wollaston, 1854

= Arthrolips =

Genus of beetles

Arthrolips is a genus of minute hooded beetles in the family Corylophidae. There are more than 20 described species in Arthrolips.

== Species ==
- Arthrolips alluaudi (Paulian, 1950)
- Arthrolips cincta Casey, 1900
- Arthrolips convexiuscula (Motschulsky, 1849)
- Arthrolips decolor (LeConte, 1852)
- Arthrolips fasciata Erichson, 1842
- Arthrolips hetschkoi (Reitter, 1913)
- Arthrolips humilis (Rosenhauer, 1856)
- Arthrolips indescreta (Peyerimhoff, 1917)
- Arthrolips klapperichi Bowestead, 1999
- Arthrolips matthewsi (Csiki, 1900)
- Arthrolips meionitida Bowestead, 1999
- Arthrolips misella (LeConte, 1852)
- Arthrolips mollinus (Schwarz, 1878)
- Arthrolips nimia Casey, 1900
- Arthrolips oblonga (Broun, 1893)
- Arthrolips obscura (Sahlberg, 1833)
- Arthrolips palmarum (Paulian, 1950)
- Arthrolips picea (Comolli, 1837)
- Arthrolips robustula Casey
- Arthrolips scitula (LeConte, 1852)
- Arthrolips sparsa Casey, 1900
- Arthrolips splendens (Schwarz, 1878)
