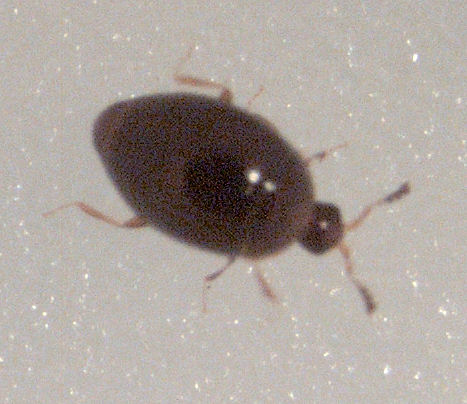

Scientific classification
- Domain: Eukaryota
- Kingdom: Animalia
- Phylum: Arthropoda
- Class: Insecta
- Order: Coleoptera
- Suborder: Polyphaga
- Infraorder: Cucujiformia
- Family: Corylophidae
- Genus: Orthoperus; Stephens, 1829

Synonyms
- Eutrilia Casey, 1900; Microsphaera Redtenbacher, 1845

= Orthoperus =

Genus of beetles

Orthoperus is a genus of minute hooded beetles in the family Corylophidae. There are more than 20 described species in Orthoperus.

== Species ==
These 28 species belong to the genus Orthoperus:

- Orthoperus aeneocollis Blatchley, 1927
- Orthoperus aequalis Sharp in Blackburn & Sharp, 1885
- Orthoperus alutaceus Casey, 1900
- Orthoperus anxius Mulsant & Rey, 1861
- Orthoperus arizonicus Casey, 1900
- Orthoperus atomarius (Heer, 1841)
- Orthoperus atomus (Gyllenhal, 1808)
- Orthoperus bahamicus Casey, 1900
- Orthoperus brunneus (Casey, 1900)
- Orthoperus brunnipes (Gyllenhal, 1808)
- Orthoperus corticalis (Redtenbacher, 1845)
- Orthoperus cribratus Matthews, 1899
- Orthoperus crotchii Matthews, 1899
- Orthoperus glaber (LeConte, 1852)
- Orthoperus gracilipes Matthews, 1899
- Orthoperus intersitus Bruce, 1951
- Orthoperus loebli Bowestead, 1999
- Orthoperus lucidus Casey
- Orthoperus micros Casey, 1900
- Orthoperus minutissimus Matthews, 1899
- Orthoperus nigrescens Stephens, 1829
- Orthoperus piceus Casey
- Orthoperus princeps Casey, 1900
- Orthoperus punctatus Wankowicz, 1865
- Orthoperus rogeri Kraatz, 1874
- Orthoperus scutellaris LeConte, 1878
- Orthoperus suturalis LeConte, 1852
- Orthoperus texanus Casey, 1900
