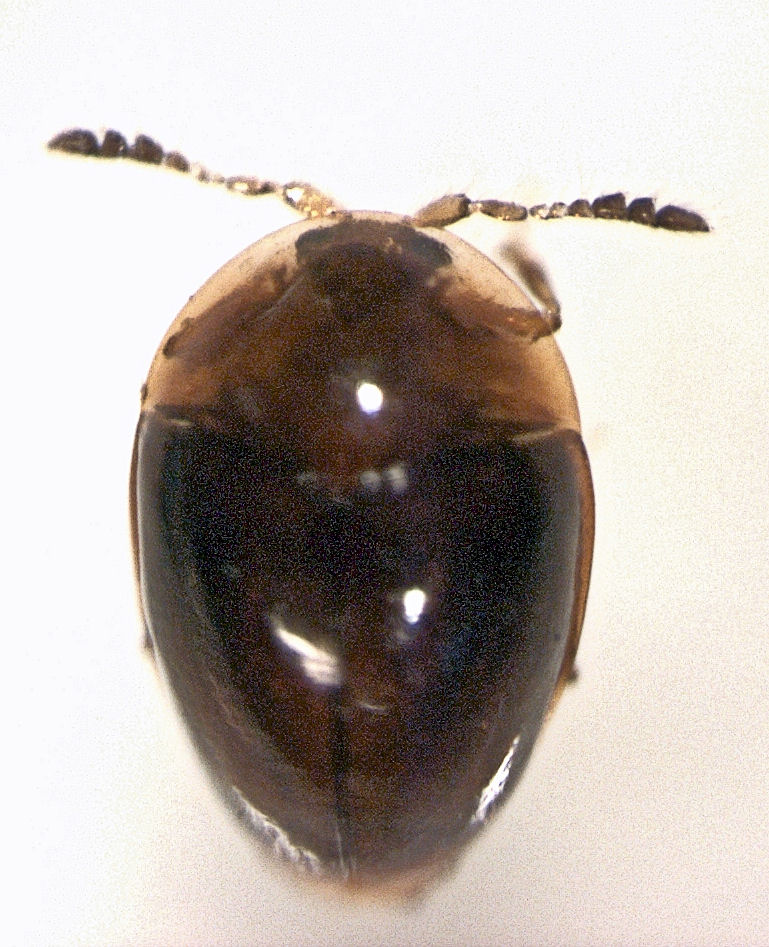

Scientific classification
- Kingdom: Animalia
- Phylum: Arthropoda
- Class: Insecta
- Order: Coleoptera
- Suborder: Polyphaga
- Infraorder: Cucujiformia
- Family: Corylophidae
- Genus: Corylophus; Leach, 1833

= Corylophus =

Genus of beetles

Corylophus is a genus of beetles belonging to the family Corylophidae.

The species of this genus are found in Europe, Southern Africa and Japan.

Species:

- Corylophus cassidordes (Marsham)
