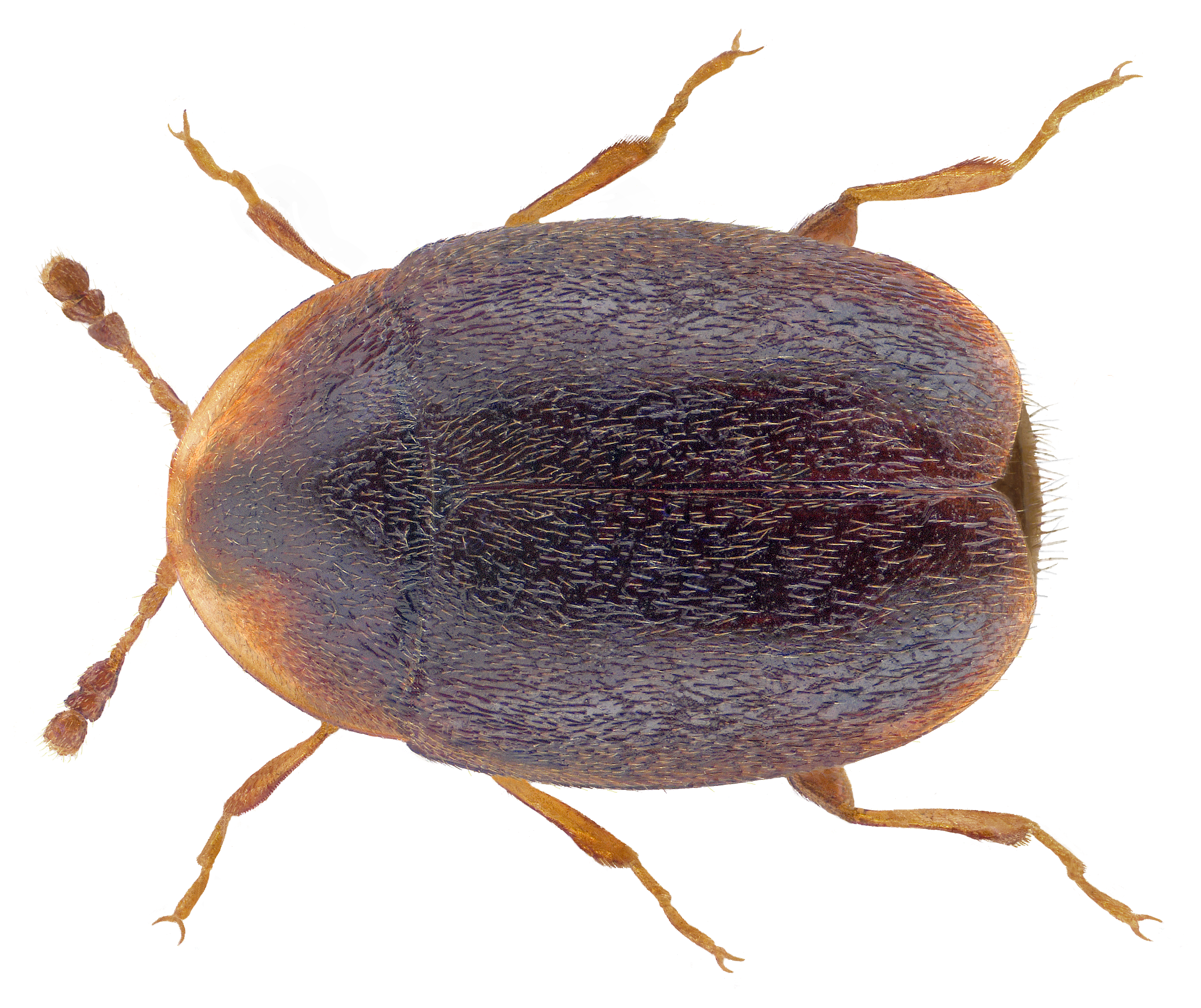
- Arthrolips obscura

Scientific classification
- Kingdom: Animalia
- Phylum: Arthropoda
- Clade: Pancrustacea
- Class: Insecta
- Order: Coleoptera
- Suborder: Polyphaga
- Infraorder: Cucujiformia
- Superfamily: Coccinelloidea
- Family: Corylophidae; LeConte, 1852

Tribes
- Aenigmaticini; Cleidostethini; Corylophini; Foadiini; Orthoperini; Parmulini; Peltinodini; Rypobiini; Sericoderini; Teplinini

Synonyms
- Orthoperidae

= Corylophidae =

Corylophidae Temporal range: Cenomanian–Recent

Family of beetles

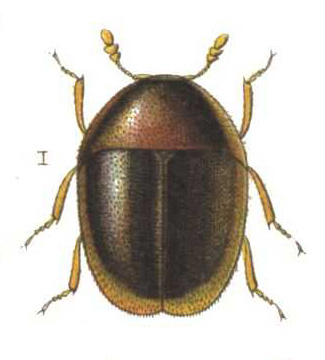
Sericoderus lateralis

Corylophidae is a family of very small beetles — commonly referred to as minute hooded beetles (so called because the pronotum of most family members often covers the head) or less commonly as minute fungus beetles — in the superfamily Coccinelloidea. There are about 18 genera and at least 120 described species in Corylophidae. They feed on microfungi such as molds, and are often found associated with bark, as well as in leaf litter and other decaying vegetation. In older literature, the family name was often given as Orthoperidae.

== Genera ==
- Aenigmaticum Matthews, 1888^{i c g b}
- Aposericoderus Paulian, 1950^{g}
- Arthrolipes^{g}
- Arthrolips Wollaston, 1854^{i c g b}
- Clypastraea Haldeman, 1842^{i c g b}
- Clypastrea^{g}
- Corylophus Leach, 1833^{g}
- Foadia Pakaluk, 1985^{i c g}
- Gloeosoma Wollaston, 1854^{i c g b}
- Holopsis Broun, 1883^{i c g b}
- Hoplicnema Matthews, 1899^{g}
- Microstagetus Wollaston, 1861^{i c g b}
- Orthoperus Stephens, 1829^{i c g b}
- Rypobius LeConte, 1852^{i c g b}
- Sericoderus Stephens, 1829^{i c g b}
- Stanus Ślipiński, Tomaszewska & Lawrence, 2009^{g}
- Teplinus Pakaluk, Slipinski & Lawrence, 1994^{g}
- Weirus Slipinski, Tomaszewska and Lawrence, 2009^{i c g}
- †Xenostanus Li et al. 2022 Burmese amber, Myanmar, mid Cretaceous (latest Albian - earliest Cenomanian)

Data sources: i = ITIS, c = Catalogue of Life, g = GBIF, b = Bugguide.net
