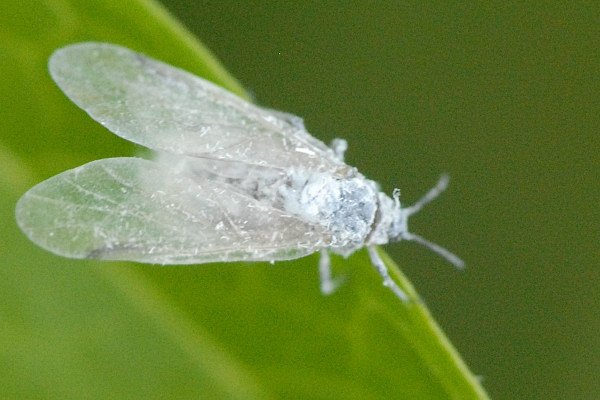
- Aleyrodes lonicerae

Scientific classification
- Kingdom: Animalia
- Phylum: Arthropoda
- Class: Insecta
- Order: Hemiptera
- Suborder: Sternorrhyncha
- Family: Aleyrodidae
- Subfamily: Aleyrodinae; Westwood, 1840

= Aleyrodinae =

Subfamily of true bugs

Aleyrodinae is a subfamily of whiteflies in the family Aleyrodidae.

== Genera ==
- Acanthaleyrodes Takahashi, 1931
- Acanthobemisia Takahashi, 1935
- Acaudaleyrodes Takahashi, 1951
- Acutaleyrodes Takahashi, 1960
- Africaleurodes Dozier, 1934
- Agrostaleyrodes Ko, 2001
- Aleurocanthus Quaintance & Baker, 1914
- Aleurocerus Bondar, 1923
- Aleurochiton Tullgren, 1907
- Aleuroclava Singh, 1931
- Aleurocybotus Quaintance & Baker, 1914
- Aleurocyperus Ko & Dubey, 2007
- Aleuroduplidens Martin, 1999
- Aleuroglandulus Bondar, 1923
- Aleuroinanis Martin, 1999
- Aleurolobus Quaintance & Baker, 1914
- Aleurolonga Mound, 1965
- Aleuromarginatus Corbett, 1935
- Aleuropapillatus Regu & David, 1993
- Aleuroparadoxus Quaintance & Baker, 1914
- Aleuroplatus Quaintance & Baker, 1914
- Aleuropleurocelus Drews & Sampson, 1956
- Aleuroporosus Corbett, 1935
- Aleuropteridis Mound, 1961
- Aleuroputeus Corbett, 1935
- Aleurothrixus Quaintance & Baker, 1914
- Aleurotithius Quaintance & Baker, 1914
- Aleurotrachelus Quaintance & Baker, 1914
- Aleurotuba Tremblay & Iaccarino, 1978
- Aleurotulus Quaintance & Baker, 1914
- Aleuroviggianus Iaccarino, 1982
- Aleurovitreus Martin, 2005
- Aleyrodes Latreille, 1796
- Aleyrodiella Danzig, 1966
- Anomaleyrodes Takahashi & Mamet, 1952
- Apobemisia Takahashi, 1954
- Arachnaleyrodes Bink-Moenen, 1983
- Asialeyrodes Corbett, 1935
- Asterobemisia Trehan, 1940
- Asterochiton Maskell, 1879
- Axacalia Danzig, 1969
- Bellitudo Russell, 1943
- Bemisaleyrodes Cohic, 1969
- Bemisia Quaintance & Baker, 1914
- Bemisiella Danzig, 1966
- Brazzaleyrodes Cohic, 1966
- Bulgarialeurodes Corbett, 1936
- Calluneyrodes Zahradnik, 1961
- Chitonaleyrodes Martin, 1999
- Cockerelliella Sundararaj & David, 1992
- Cohicaleyrodes Bink-Moenen, 1983
- Combesaleyrodes Cohic, 1966
- Corbettia Dozier, 1934
- Crenidorsum Russell, 1945
- Crescentaleyrodes David & Jesudasan, 1987
- Cryptolingula Martin & Carver, 1999
- Davidiella Dubey & Sundararaj, 2005
- Dialeurodes Cockerell, 1902
- Dialeurolobus Danzig, 1964
- Dialeurolonga Dozier, 1928
- Dialeuropora Quaintance & Baker, 1917
- Dialeurotrachelus Takahashi, 1942
- Disiphon Russell, 1993
- Distinctaleyrodes Dubey & Sundararaj, 2006
- Dothioia Dumbleton, 1961
- Dumbletoniella Jesudasan & David, 1990
- Editaaleyrodes David, 2005
- Extensaleyrodes Bink-Moenen, 1983
- Fascaleyrodes Bink-Moenen, 1983
- Filicaleyrodes Takahashi, 1962
- Fippataleyrodes Sundararaj & David, 1992
- Gagudjuia Martin, 1999
- Gomenella Dumbleton, 1961
- Harpaleyrodes Bink-Moenen, 1983
- Hesperaleyrodes Sampson, 1943
- Heteraleyrodes Takahashi, 1942
- Heterobemisia Takahashi, 1957
- Indoaleyrodes David & Subramaniam, 1976
- Juglasaleyrodes Cohic, 1966
- Keralaleyrodes Meganathan & David, 1994
- Laingiella Corbett, 1926
- Leucopogonella Dumbleton, 1961
- Lipaleyrodes Takahashi, 1962
- Malayaleyrodes Corbett, 1935
- Marginaleyrodes Takahashi, 1961
- Massilieurodes Goux, 1939
- Metabemisia Takahashi, 1963
- Metaleyrodes Sampson, 1943
- Minutaleyrodes Jesudasan & David, 1990
- Mixaleyrodes Takahashi, 1936
- Nealeyrodes Hempel, 1922
- Neoaleurodes Bondar, 1923
- Neoaleurotrachelus Takahashi & Mamet, 1952
- Neomaskellia Quaintance & Baker, 1913
- Neopealius Takahashi, 1954
- Nigrasialeyrodes Martin & Carver, 1999
- Orchamoplatus Russell, 1958
- Orientaleyrodes David, 1993
- Orstomaleyrodes Cohic, 1966
- Papillipes Bink-Moenen, 1983
- Parabemisia Takahashi, 1952
- Paraleurolobus Sampson & Drews, 1941
- Paulianaleyrodes Cohic, 1966
- Pealius Quaintance & Baker, 1914
- Pectinaleyrodes Bink-Moenen, 1983
- Pentaleyrodes Takahashi, 1937
- Peracchius Lima & Racca-Filho, 2005
- Plataleyrodes Takahashi & Mamet, 1952
- Pogonaleyrodes Takahashi, 1955
- Pseudaleurolobus Hempel, 1922
- Pseudaleuroplatus Martin, 1999
- Pseudaleyrodes Hempel, 1922
- Pseudozaphanera Manzari, 2006
- Ramsesseus Zahradnik, 1970
- Rhachisphora Quaintance & Baker, 1917
- Rosanovia Danzig, 1969
- Rugaleyrodes Bink-Moenen, 1983
- Rusostigma Quaintance & Baker, 1917
- Russellaleyrodes David, 1973
- Septaleurodicus Sampson, 1943
- Setaleyrodes Takahashi, 1931
- Simplaleurodes Goux, 1945
- Singhiella Sampson, 1943
- Singhius Takahashi, 1932
- Siphoninus Silvestri, 1915
- Sphericaleyrodes Selvakumaran & David, 1996
- Tegmaleurodes Martin, 2005
- Tetraleurodes Cockerell, 1902
- Tetralicia Harrison, 1917
- Trialeurodes Cockerell, 1902
- Trialeurolonga Martin, 2005
- Trichoaleyrodes Takahashi & Mamet, 1952
- Tuberaleyrodes Takahashi, 1932
- Vasantharajiella P.M.M. David, 2000
- Vasdavidius Russell, 2000
- Venezaleurodes Russell, 1967
- Viennotaleyrodes Cohic, 1968
- Xenaleyrodes Takahashi, 1936
- Xenobemisia Takahashi, 1951
- Yleyrodes Bink-Moenen, 1983
- Zaphanera Corbett, 1926
