= Rhachisphora styraci =

Scientific classification
- Kingdom: Animalia
- Phylum: Arthropoda
- Class: Insecta
- Order: Hemiptera
- Suborder: Sternorrhyncha
- Family: Aleyrodidae
- Subfamily: Aleyrodinae
- Genus: Rhachisphora
- Species: R. styraci

Binomial name
- Rhachisphora styraci (Takahashi, 1934)

Synonyms
- Dialeurodes (Rhachisphora) styraci Takahashi, 1934

Species of whitefly

Rhachisphora styraci is a species of whitefly in the Aleyrodidae family. It was first described in 1934 by Roichi Takahashi.

It is found in Japan, and Korea.
