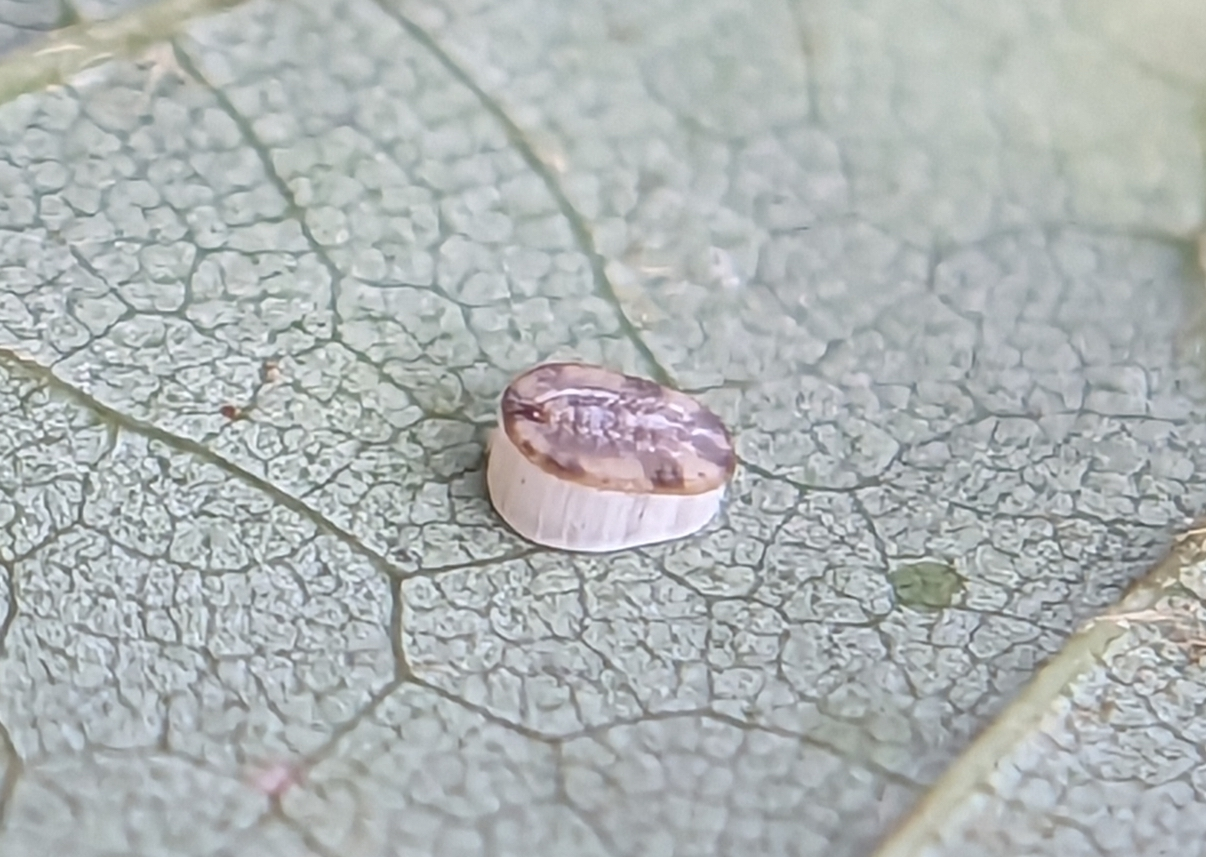
- Puparium on the underside of a silver maple leaf

Scientific classification
- Domain: Eukaryota
- Kingdom: Animalia
- Phylum: Arthropoda
- Class: Insecta
- Order: Hemiptera
- Suborder: Sternorrhyncha
- Family: Aleyrodidae
- Genus: Aleurochiton
- Species: A. forbesii

Binomial name
- Aleurochiton forbesii (Ashmead, 1893)

Synonyms
- Synonymy: Aleurodes aceris Forbes; Nealeurochiton forbesii Samp.

= Aleurochiton forbesii =

Species of whitefly

Aleurochiton forbesii is a whitefly species found in the eastern United States and Canada. It is a parasite of maple trees and occasionally hollies.

== Description ==
There are two broods of pupae each year. Puparia of the first, in the early summer, are nearly colorless; puparia of overwintering individuals, most visible in the fall on the underside of leaves, have a distinctive brown pigmented pattern. These puparia are raised on a vertical fringe of whitish wax, which varies in height as the individuals age; mature individuals can have fringes with heights nearly two-thirds that of the diameter of the puparium.

Adults have a generally yellow body, with paler legs and antennae, and unmarked white wings with venation typical for Aleurochiton.

== Distribution ==
Aleurochiton forbesii is commonly found on silver maple, red maple, and sometimes Norway maple. It has also been reported on two holly species – Ilex coriacea and Ilex glabra. Its range stretches south to Georgia and Mississippi, north to New Brunswick and Ontario, and west to Wisconsin, Illinois, and Missouri.

== Ecology ==
In the fall, puparia fall to the ground on dead leaves, yielding adult whiteflies in the spring. It has not been known to become abundant enough to injure its host plants, unlike the closely related European Aleurochiton aceris.

The species can be parasitized by Amitus aleurodinis, a small parasitoid wasp in the Platygastridae family.
