= List of whitefly species =

Aleyrodidae is a large hemipteran family called the whiteflies. It contains the following species:

== Aleyrodinae Westwood, 1840 ==
- Acanthaleyrodes Takahashi, 1931

- Acanthaleyrodes callicarpae Takahashi, 1931
- Acanthaleyrodes styraci Takahashi, 1942

- Acanthobemisia Takahashi, 1935

- Acanthobemisia distylii Takahashi, 1935
- Acanthobemisia indicus Meganathan & David, 1994

- Acaudaleyrodes Takahashi, 1951

- Acaudaleyrodes africanus Dozier, 1934
- Acaudaleyrodes ebeni Manzari & Alemansoor, 2005
- Acaudaleyrodes pauliani Takahashi, 1951
- Acaudaleyrodes rachipora Singh, 1931
- Acaudaleyrodes tuberculata Bink-Moenen, 1983

- Acutaleyrodes Takahashi, 1960

- Acutaleyrodes palmae Takahashi, 1960

- Africaleurodes Dozier, 1934

- Africaleurodes adami Cohic, 1968
- Africaleurodes ananthakrishnani Dubey & Sundararaj, 2006
- Africaleurodes balachowskyi Cohic, 1968
- Africaleurodes capgrasi Cohic, 1968
- Africaleurodes citri Takahashi, 1932
- Africaleurodes coffeacola Dozier, 1934
- Africaleurodes fulakariensis Cohic, 1966
- Africaleurodes hexalobi Bink-Moenen, 1983
- Africaleurodes indicus Regu & David, 1993
- Africaleurodes karwarensis Dubey & Sundararaj, 2006
- Africaleurodes loganiaceae Dozier, 1934
- Africaleurodes martini Cohic, 1968
- Africaleurodes ochnaceae Dozier, 1934
- Africaleurodes pauliani Cohic, 1968
- Africaleurodes simula Peal, 1903
- Africaleurodes souliei Ardaillon & Cohic, 1970
- Africaleurodes tetracerae Cohic, 1966
- Africaleurodes uvariae Cohic, 1968
- Africaleurodes vrijdaghii Ghesquière in Mayné & Ghesquière, 1934

- Agrostaleyrodes Ko, 2001

- Agrostaleyrodes arcanus Ko in Ko, Chou & Wu, 2001

- Aleurocanthus Quaintance & Baker, 1914

- Aleurocanthus arecae David & Manjunatha, 2003
- Aleurocanthus ayyari Regu & David, 1993
- Aleurocanthus bambusae Peal, 1903
- Aleurocanthus bangalorensis Dubey & Sundararaj, 2004
- Aleurocanthus banksiae Maskell, 1896
- Aleurocanthus brevispinosus Dumbleton, 1961
- Aleurocanthus calophylli Kotinsky, 1907
- Aleurocanthus ceracroceus Martin, 1999
- Aleurocanthus cheni Young, 1942
- Aleurocanthus chiengmaiensis Takahashi, 1942
- Aleurocanthus cinnamomi Takahashi, 1931
- Aleurocanthus citriperdus Quaintance & Baker, 1916
- Aleurocanthus clitoriae Jesudasan & David, 1991
- Aleurocanthus cocois Corbett, 1927
- Aleurocanthus corbetti Takahashi, 1951
- Aleurocanthus davidi David & Subramaniam, 1976
- Aleurocanthus delottoi Cohic, 1969
- Aleurocanthus dissimilis Quaintance & Baker, 1917
- Aleurocanthus esakii Takahashi, 1936
- Aleurocanthus eugeniae Takahashi, 1933
- Aleurocanthus euphorbiae Jesudasan & David, 1991
- Aleurocanthus ficicola David, 1993
- Aleurocanthus firmianae Dubey & Sundararaj, 2004
- Aleurocanthus froggatti Martin, 1999
- Aleurocanthus gateri Corbett, 1927
- Aleurocanthus goaensis Dubey & Sundararaj, 2004
- Aleurocanthus gordoniae Takahashi, 1941
- Aleurocanthus gymnosporiae Jesudasan & David, 1991
- Aleurocanthus hibisci Corbett, 1935
- Aleurocanthus hirsutus Maskell, 1896
- Aleurocanthus husaini Corbett, 1939
- Aleurocanthus imperialis Cohic, 1968
- Aleurocanthus inceratus Silvestri, 1927
- Aleurocanthus indicus David & Regu, 1989
- Aleurocanthus ixorae Jesudasan & David, 1991
- Aleurocanthus leptadeniae Cohic, 1968
- Aleurocanthus lobulatus Jesudasan & David, 1991
- Aleurocanthus longispinus Quaintance & Baker, 1917
- Aleurocanthus loyolae David & Subramaniam, 1976
- Aleurocanthus luteus Martin, 1985
- Aleurocanthus mackenziei Cohic, 1969
- Aleurocanthus mangiferae Quaintance & Baker, 1917
- Aleurocanthus martini David, 1993
- Aleurocanthus marudamalaiensis David & Subramanium, 1976
- Aleurocanthus mayumbensis Cohic, 1966
- Aleurocanthus multispinosus Dumbleton, 1961
- Aleurocanthus musae David & Jesudasan, 2002
- Aleurocanthus mvoutiensis Cohic, 1966
- Aleurocanthus niger Corbett, 1926
- Aleurocanthus nigricans Corbett, 1926
- Aleurocanthus nudus Dumbleton, 1961
- Aleurocanthus palauensis Kuwana in Kuwana & Muramatsu, 1931
- Aleurocanthus papuanus Martin, 1985
- Aleurocanthus pendleburyi Corbett, 1935
- Aleurocanthus piperis Maskell, 1896
- Aleurocanthus regis Mound, 1965
- Aleurocanthus rugosa Singh, 1931
- Aleurocanthus russellae Jesudasan & David, 1991
- Aleurocanthus satyanarayani Dubey & Sundararaj, 2004
- Aleurocanthus serratus Quaintance & Baker, 1917
- Aleurocanthus seshadrii David & Subramaniam, 1976
- Aleurocanthus shillongensis Jesudasan & David, 1991
- Aleurocanthus siamensis Takahashi, 1942
- Aleurocanthus singhi Jesudasan & David, 1991
- Aleurocanthus spiniferus Quaintance, 1903
- Aleurocanthus spinithorax Dumbleton, 1961
- Aleurocanthus spinosus Kuwana, 1911
- Aleurocanthus splendens David & Subramaniam, 1976
- Aleurocanthus strychnosicola Cohic, 1966
- Aleurocanthus terminaliae Dubey & Sundararaj, 2004
- Aleurocanthus trispina Mound, 1965
- Aleurocanthus t-signatus Maskell, 1896
- Aleurocanthus valenciae Martin & Carver in Martin, 1999
- Aleurocanthus valparaiensis David & Subramaniam, 1976
- Aleurocanthus vindhyachali Dubey & Sundararaj, 2004
- Aleurocanthus voeltzkowi Newstead, 1908
- Aleurocanthus woglumi Ashby, 1915
- Aleurocanthus zizyphi Priesner & Hosny, 1934

- Aleurocerus Bondar, 1923

- Aleurocerus ceriferus Sampson & Drews, 1941
- Aleurocerus chiclensis Russell, 1986
- Aleurocerus coccolobae Russell, 1986
- Aleurocerus colombiae Russell, 1986
- Aleurocerus flavomarginatus Bondar, 1923
- Aleurocerus luxuriosus Bondar, 1923
- Aleurocerus musae Russell, 1986
- Aleurocerus palmae Russell, 1986
- Aleurocerus petiolicola Russell, 1986
- Aleurocerus tumidosus Bondar, 1923

- Aleurochiton Tullgren, 1907

- Aleurochiton acerinus Haupt, 1934
- Aleurochiton aceris Modeer, 1778
- Aleurochiton forbesii Ashmead, 1893
- Aleurochiton orientalis Danzig, 1966
- Aleurochiton pseudoplatani Visnya, 1936

- Aleuroclava Singh, 1931

- Aleuroclava afriae Sundararaj & David, 1995
- Aleuroclava angkorensis Takahashi, 1942
- Aleuroclava artocarpi Corbett, 1935
- Aleuroclava aucubae Kuwana, 1911
- Aleuroclava ayyari Sundararaj & David, 1993
- Aleuroclava baccaureae Corbett, 1935
- Aleuroclava bauhiniae Corbett, 1935
- Aleuroclava bifurcata Corbett, 1933
- Aleuroclava bilineata Sundararaj & David, 1993
- Aleuroclava bulbiformi Qureshi, 1982
- Aleuroclava burmanicus Singh, 1938
- Aleuroclava calicutensis Dubey & Sundararaj, 2005
- Aleuroclava calycopteriseae Dubey & Sundararaj, 2005
- Aleuroclava canangae Corbett, 1935
- Aleuroclava cardamomi David & Subramaniam, 1976
- Aleuroclava carpini Takahashi, 1939
- Aleuroclava cinnamomi Jesudasan & David, 1991
- Aleuroclava citri Jesudasan & David, 1991
- Aleuroclava citrifolii Corbett, 1935
- Aleuroclava complex Singh, 1931
- Aleuroclava cordii Qureshi, 1982
- Aleuroclava davidi Qureshi, 1982
- Aleuroclava dehradunensis Jesudasan & David, 1991
- Aleuroclava doddabettaensis Dubey & Sundararaj, 2005
- Aleuroclava doveri Corbett, 1935
- Aleuroclava dubius Bink-Moenen, 1983
- Aleuroclava ehretiae Jesudasan & David, 1991
- Aleuroclava elatostemae Takahashi, 1932
- Aleuroclava erythrinae Corbett, 1935
- Aleuroclava eugeniae Corbett, 1935
- Aleuroclava euphoriae Takahashi, 1942
- Aleuroclava euryae Kuwana, 1911
- Aleuroclava evanantiae Jesudasan & David, 1991
- Aleuroclava fici Corbett, 1935
- Aleuroclava ficicola Takahashi, 1932
- Aleuroclava filamentosa Corbett, 1933
- Aleuroclava flabellus Takahashi, 1949
- Aleuroclava fletcheri Sundararaj & David, 1992
- Aleuroclava goaensis Jesudasan & David, 1991
- Aleuroclava gordoniae Takahashi, 1932
- Aleuroclava grewiae Sundararaj & David, 1993
- Aleuroclava guyavae Takahashi, 1932
- Aleuroclava hexcantha Singh, 1940
- Aleuroclava hikosanensis Takahashi, 1938
- Aleuroclava hindustanicus Meganathan & David, 1994
- Aleuroclava indicus Singh, 1931
- Aleuroclava jasmini Takahashi, 1932
- Aleuroclava kanyakumariensis Sundararaj & David, 1993
- Aleuroclava kavalurensis Jesudasan & David, 1991
- Aleuroclava kerala Martin & Mound, 2007
- Aleuroclava kudremukhensis Dubey & Sundararaj, 2005
- Aleuroclava kuwanai Takahashi, 1934
- Aleuroclava lagerstroemiae Takahashi, 1934
- Aleuroclava lanceolata Takahashi, 1949
- Aleuroclava latus Takahashi, 1934
- Aleuroclava lefroyi Sundararaj & David, 1993
- Aleuroclava lithocarpi Takahashi, 1934
- Aleuroclava longisetosus Jesudasan & David, 1991
- Aleuroclava longispinus Takahashi, 1934
- Aleuroclava louiseae Sundararaj & David, 1993
- Aleuroclava macarangae Corbett, 1935
- Aleuroclava madhucae Jesudasan & David, 1991
- Aleuroclava magnoliae Takahashi, 1952
- Aleuroclava malloti Takahashi, 1932
- Aleuroclava manii David, 1978
- Aleuroclava martini Dubey & Sundararaj, 2005
- Aleuroclava maximus Qureshi, 1982
- Aleuroclava melastomae Takahashi, 1934
- Aleuroclava meliosmae Takahashi, 1932
- Aleuroclava montanus Takahashi, 1939
- Aleuroclava multipori Takahashi, 1935
- Aleuroclava multituberculata Sundararaj & David, 1993
- Aleuroclava murrayae Singh, 1931
- Aleuroclava mysorensis Jesudasan & David, 1991
- Aleuroclava nachiensis Takahashi, 1963
- Aleuroclava nagercoilensis Sundararaj & David, 1993
- Aleuroclava nanjangudensis Jesudasan & David, 1991
- Aleuroclava neolitseae Takahashi, 1934
- Aleuroclava nephelii Corbett, 1935
- Aleuroclava nigeriae Mound, 1965
- Aleuroclava nitidus Singh, 1932
- Aleuroclava orientalis David & Jesudasan, 1988
- Aleuroclava papillata Sundararaj & Dubey, 2004
- Aleuroclava parvus Singh, 1938
- Aleuroclava pentatuberculata Sundararaj & David, 1993
- Aleuroclava philomenae Jesudasan & David, 1991
- Aleuroclava phyllanthi Corbett, 1935
- Aleuroclava piperis Takahashi, 1935
- Aleuroclava pongamiae Jesudasan & David, 1991
- Aleuroclava porosus Priesner & Hosny, 1937
- Aleuroclava psidii Singh, 1931
- Aleuroclava pulcherrimus Corbett, 1935
- Aleuroclava pyracanthae Takahashi, 1933
- Aleuroclava ramachandrani Dubey & Sundararaj, 2005
- Aleuroclava regui Sundararaj & David, 1993
- Aleuroclava rhododendri Takahashi, 1935
- Aleuroclava saputarensis Sundararaj & David, 1993
- Aleuroclava selvakumarani Sundararaj & David, 1993
- Aleuroclava sepangensis Martin & Mound, 2007
- Aleuroclava siamensis Takahashi, 1942
- Aleuroclava similis Takahashi, 1938
- Aleuroclava simplex Takahashi, 1949
- Aleuroclava singhi Jesudasan & David, 1991
- Aleuroclava sivakasiensis Sundararaj & David, 1993
- Aleuroclava srilankaensis David, 1993
- Aleuroclava stereospermi Corbett, 1935
- Aleuroclava subindica Martin & Mound, 2007
- Aleuroclava submarginatus Qureshi, 1982
- Aleuroclava takahashii David & Subramaniam, 1976
- Aleuroclava tarennae Martin & Mound, 2007
- Aleuroclava tentaculiformis Corbett, 1935
- Aleuroclava terminaliae Sundararaj & David, 1993
- Aleuroclava thysanospermi Takahashi, 1934
- Aleuroclava trachelospermi Takahashi, 1938
- Aleuroclava trilineata Sundararaj & David, 1993
- Aleuroclava tripori Dubey & Sundararaj, 2006
- Aleuroclava trochodendri Takahashi, 1957
- Aleuroclava ubonensis Takahashi, 1942
- Aleuroclava uraianus Takahashi, 1932
- Aleuroclava vernoniae Meganathan & David, 1994
- Aleuroclava vitexae Sundararaj & David, 1993
- Aleuroclava wrightiae Jesudasan & David, 1991

- Aleurocybotus Quaintance & Baker, 1914

- Aleurocybotus cereus Martin, 2005
- Aleurocybotus graminicolus Quaintance, 1899
- Aleurocybotus occiduus Russell, 1964

- Aleurocyperus Ko & Dubey, 2007

- Aleurocyperus humus Ko & Dubey, 2007

- Aleuroduplidens Martin, 1999

- Aleuroduplidens carverae Martin, 1999
- Aleuroduplidens croceata Maskell, 1896
- Aleuroduplidens eucalyptifolia Martin, 1999
- Aleuroduplidens santali Martin, 1999
- Aleuroduplidens triangularis Martin, 1999
- Aleuroduplidens wellsae Martin, 1999

- Aleuroglandulus Bondar, 1923

- Aleuroglandulus inanis Martin, 2005
- Aleuroglandulus magnus Russell, 1944
- Aleuroglandulus striatus Sampson & Drews, 1941
- Aleuroglandulus subtilis Bondar, 1923

- Aleuroinanis Martin, 1999

- Aleuroinanis myrtacei Martin, 1999

- Aleurolobus Quaintance & Baker, 1914

- Aleurolobus acanthi Takahashi, 1936
- Aleurolobus antennata Regu & David, 1993
- Aleurolobus azadirachtae Regu & David, 1993
- Aleurolobus azimae Jesudasan & David, 1991
- Aleurolobus barleriae Jesudasan & David, 1991
- Aleurolobus barodensis Maskell, 1896
- Aleurolobus bidentatus Singh, 1940
- Aleurolobus burliarensis Jesudasan & David, 1991
- Aleurolobus cassiae Jesudasan & David, 1991
- Aleurolobus cephalidistinctus Regu & David, 1993
- Aleurolobus cissampelosae Regu & David, 1993
- Aleurolobus cohici Regu & David, 1993
- Aleurolobus confusus David & Subramaniam, 1976
- Aleurolobus dalbergiae Dubey & Sundararaj, 2006
- Aleurolobus delamarei Cohic, 1969
- Aleurolobus delhiensis Regu & David, 1993
- Aleurolobus diacritica Regu & David, 1993
- Aleurolobus diastematus Bink-Moenen, 1983
- Aleurolobus distinctus Regu & David, 1993
- Aleurolobus exceptionalis Regu & David, 1993
- Aleurolobus flavus Quaintance & Baker, 1917
- Aleurolobus fouabii Cohic, 1969
- Aleurolobus graminicola Bink-Moenen, 1983
- Aleurolobus greeni Corbett, 1926
- Aleurolobus gruveli Cohic, 1968
- Aleurolobus hargreavesi Dozier, 1934
- Aleurolobus hederae Takahashi, 1935
- Aleurolobus hosurensis Regu & David, 1993
- Aleurolobus indigoferae Regu & David, 1993
- Aleurolobus iteae Takahashi, 1957
- Aleurolobus japonicus Takahashi, 1954
- Aleurolobus jullieni Cohic, 1968
- Aleurolobus karunkuliensis Jesudasan & David, 1991
- Aleurolobus lagerstroemiae Regu & David, 1993
- Aleurolobus longisetosus Dubey & Sundararaj, 2006
- Aleurolobus luci Cohic, 1969
- Aleurolobus macarangae Regu & David, 1993
- Aleurolobus madrasensis Regu & David, 1993
- Aleurolobus marlatti Quaintance, 1903
- Aleurolobus mauritanicus Cohic, 1969
- Aleurolobus moundi David & Subramaniam, 1976
- Aleurolobus musae Corbett, 1935
- Aleurolobus nagercoilensis Regu & David, 1993
- Aleurolobus olivinus Silvestri, 1911
- Aleurolobus onitshae Mound, 1965
- Aleurolobus oplismeni Takahashi, 1931
- Aleurolobus orientalis David & Jesudasan, 1988
- Aleurolobus osmanthi Young, 1944
- Aleurolobus ovalis Regu & David, 1993
- Aleurolobus padappaiensis Regu & David, 1993
- Aleurolobus panvelensis Regu & David, 1993
- Aleurolobus patchlily Regu & David, 1993
- Aleurolobus pauliani Cohic, 1969
- Aleurolobus philippinensis Quaintance & Baker, 1917
- Aleurolobus piliostigmatos Bink-Moenen, 1983
- Aleurolobus psidii Jesudasan & David, 1991
- Aleurolobus rhachisphora Regu & David, 1993
- Aleurolobus rhododendri Takahashi, 1934
- Aleurolobus riveae Regu & David, 1993
- Aleurolobus russellae Regu & David, 1993
- Aleurolobus sairandhryensis Meganathan & David, 1994
- Aleurolobus saklespurensis Regu & David, 1993
- Aleurolobus saputarensis Regu & David, 1993
- Aleurolobus scolopiae Takahashi, 1933
- Aleurolobus selangorensis Corbett, 1935
- Aleurolobus setigerus Quaintance & Baker, 1917
- Aleurolobus shiiae Takahashi, 1957
- Aleurolobus singhi Regu & David, 1993
- Aleurolobus solitarius Quaintance & Baker, 1917
- Aleurolobus spinosus Jesudasan & David, 1991
- Aleurolobus sterculiae Jesudasan & David, 1991
- Aleurolobus styraci Takahashi, 1954
- Aleurolobus subrotundus Silvestri, 1927
- Aleurolobus sundararaji Regu & David, 1993
- Aleurolobus szechwanensis Young, 1942
- Aleurolobus taonabae Kuwana, 1911
- Aleurolobus tassellatus Regu & David, 1993
- Aleurolobus tchadiensis Bink-Moenen, 1983
- Aleurolobus teucrii Mifsud & Palmeri, 1996
- Aleurolobus tuberculatus Regu & David, 1993
- Aleurolobus valparaiensis Jesudasan & David, 1991
- Aleurolobus vitis Danzig, 1966
- Aleurolobus walayarensis Jesudasan & David, 1991
- Aleurolobus wunni Ryberg, 1938

- Aleurolonga Mound, 1965

- Aleurolonga cassiae Mound, 1965

- Aleuromarginatus Corbett, 1935

- Aleuromarginatus bauhiniae Corbett, 1935
- Aleuromarginatus corbettiaformis Martin, 1985
- Aleuromarginatus dalbergiae Cohic, 1969
- Aleuromarginatus kallarensis David & Subramaniam, 1976
- Aleuromarginatus littoralis Martin, 1985
- Aleuromarginatus marginiquus Martin, 1999
- Aleuromarginatus millettiae Cohic, 1968
- Aleuromarginatus moundi Martin, 1999
- Aleuromarginatus nemciae Martin, 1999
- Aleuromarginatus nigrus Martin, 1999
- Aleuromarginatus serdangensis Takahashi, 1955
- Aleuromarginatus shihmenensis Ko in Ko, Hsu & Wu, 1995
- Aleuromarginatus tephrosiae Corbett, 1935
- Aleuromarginatus thirumurthiensis David, 1988

- Aleuropapillatus Regu & David, 1993

- Aleuropapillatus gmelinae David, Jesudasan & Mathew, 1988
- Aleuropapillatus kumariensis Regu & David, 1993

- Aleuroparadoxus Quaintance & Baker, 1914

- Aleuroparadoxus arctostaphyli Russell, 1947
- Aleuroparadoxus chomeliae Russell, 1947
- Aleuroparadoxus gardeniae Russell, 1947
- Aleuroparadoxus ilicicola Russell, 1947
- Aleuroparadoxus iridescens Bemis, 1904
- Aleuroparadoxus punctatus Quaintance & Baker, 1917
- Aleuroparadoxus rhodae Russell, 1947
- Aleuroparadoxus sapotae Russell, 1947
- Aleuroparadoxus trinidadensis Russell, 1947
- Aleuroparadoxus truncatus Russell, 1947

- Aleuroplatus Quaintance & Baker, 1914

- Aleuroplatus acaciae Bink-Moenen, 1983
- Aleuroplatus affinis Takahashi, 1961
- Aleuroplatus agauriae Takahashi, 1955
- Aleuroplatus akeassii Cohic, 1969
- Aleuroplatus alcocki Peal, 1903
- Aleuroplatus alpinus Takahashi, 1955
- Aleuroplatus anapatsae Takahashi, 1951
- Aleuroplatus berbericolus Quaintance & Baker, 1917
- Aleuroplatus bignoniae Russell, 1944
- Aleuroplatus biluminiporus Martin & Malumphy, 2002
- Aleuroplatus bossi Takahashi, 1936
- Aleuroplatus cadabae Priesner & Hosny, 1934
- Aleuroplatus claricephalus Takahashi, 1940
- Aleuroplatus cockerelli von Ihering, 1897
- Aleuroplatus cococolus Quaintance & Baker, 1917
- Aleuroplatus coronata Quaintance, 1900
- Aleuroplatus daitoensis Takahashi, 1940
- Aleuroplatus dentatus Sampson & Drews, 1941
- Aleuroplatus dorsipallidus Martin, 1988
- Aleuroplatus dubius Takahashi, 1955
- Aleuroplatus elmarae Mound & Halsey, 1978
- Aleuroplatus epigaeae Russell, 1944
- Aleuroplatus evodiae Takahashi, 1960
- Aleuroplatus fici Takahashi, 1932
- Aleuroplatus ficifolii Takahashi, 1942
- Aleuroplatus ficusrugosae Quaintance & Baker, 1917
- Aleuroplatus gelatinosus Cockerell, 1898
- Aleuroplatus graphicus Bondar, 1923
- Aleuroplatus hiezi Cohic, 1968
- Aleuroplatus hoyae Peal, 1903
- Aleuroplatus ilicis Russell, 1944
- Aleuroplatus incisus Quaintance & Baker, 1917
- Aleuroplatus incurvatus Takahashi, 1961
- Aleuroplatus insularis Takahashi, 1941
- Aleuroplatus joholensis Corbett, 1935
- Aleuroplatus lateralis Bondar, 1923
- Aleuroplatus latus Takahashi, 1939
- Aleuroplatus liquidambaris Takahashi, 1941
- Aleuroplatus magnoliae Russell, 1944
- Aleuroplatus malayanus Takahashi, 1955
- Aleuroplatus mameti Takahashi, 1937
- Aleuroplatus manjakaensis Takahashi, 1955
- Aleuroplatus multipori Takahashi, 1940
- Aleuroplatus myricae Quaintance & Baker, 1917
- Aleuroplatus mysorensis David & Subramaniam, 1976
- Aleuroplatus neovatus Takahashi, 1961
- Aleuroplatus oculiminutus Quaintance & Baker, 1917
- Aleuroplatus oculireniformis Quaintance & Baker, 1917
- Aleuroplatus ovatus Quaintance & Baker, 1917
- Aleuroplatus panamensis Sampson & Drews, 1941
- Aleuroplatus pauliani Takahashi, 1955
- Aleuroplatus pectiniferus Quaintance & Baker, 1917
- Aleuroplatus periplocae Dozier, 1934
- Aleuroplatus perseaphagus Martin, Aguiar & Pita, 1996
- Aleuroplatus pileae Takahashi, 1939
- Aleuroplatus plumosus Quaintance, 1900
- Aleuroplatus polystachyae Takahashi, 1955
- Aleuroplatus premnae Corbett, 1926
- Aleuroplatus quaintancei Peal, 1903
- Aleuroplatus quercusaquaticae Quaintance, 1900
- Aleuroplatus robinsoni Takahashi, 1955
- Aleuroplatus sculpturatus Quaintance & Baker, 1917
- Aleuroplatus semiplumosus Russell, 1944
- Aleuroplatus serratus Takahashi, 1955
- Aleuroplatus sinepecten Singh, 1945
- Aleuroplatus spina Singh, 1931
- Aleuroplatus stellatus Hempel, 1922
- Aleuroplatus subrotundus Takahashi, 1938
- Aleuroplatus translucidus Quaintance & Baker, 1917
- Aleuroplatus tsibabenae Takahashi, 1955
- Aleuroplatus tsimananensis Takahashi, 1955
- Aleuroplatus tuberculatus Takahashi, 1951
- Aleuroplatus vaccinii Russell, 1944
- Aleuroplatus validus Quaintance & Baker, 1917
- Aleuroplatus variegatus Quaintance & Baker, 1917
- Aleuroplatus vinsoniodes Cockerell, 1898
- Aleuroplatus weinmanniae Takahashi, 1951

- Aleuropleurocelus Drews & Sampson, 1956

- Aleuropleurocelus abnormis Quaintance, 1900
- Aleuropleurocelus acaudatus Drews & Sampson, 1958
- Aleuropleurocelus ceanothi Sampson, 1945
- Aleuropleurocelus cecropiae Bondar, 1923
- Aleuropleurocelus coachellensis Drews & Sampson, 1958
- Aleuropleurocelus granulata Sampson & Drews, 1941
- Aleuropleurocelus laingi Drews & Sampson, 1956
- Aleuropleurocelus nigrans Bemis, 1904
- Aleuropleurocelus oblanceolatus Drews & Sampson, 1958
- Aleuropleurocelus ornatus Drews & Sampson, 1958
- Aleuropleurocelus rotunda J. M. Baker, 1937
- Aleuropleurocelus sierrae Sampson, 1945

- Aleuroporosus Corbett, 1935

- Aleuroporosus lumpurensis Corbett, 1935

- Aleuropteridis Mound, 1961

- Aleuropteridis eastopi Mound, 1961
- Aleuropteridis filicicola Newstead, 1911
- Aleuropteridis hargreavesi Mound, 1961
- Aleuropteridis jamesi Mound, 1961

- Aleuroputeus Corbett, 1935

- Aleuroputeus baccaureae Corbett, 1935
- Aleuroputeus perseae Corbett, 1935

- Aleurothrixus Quaintance & Baker, 1914

- Aleurothrixus aepim Goeldi, 1886
- Aleurothrixus aguiari Costa Lima, 1942
- Aleurothrixus antidesmae Takahashi, 1933
- Aleurothrixus bondari Costa Lima, 1942
- Aleurothrixus chivelensis Sampson & Drews, 1941
- Aleurothrixus floccosus Maskell, 1896
- Aleurothrixus guareae Costa Lima, 1942
- Aleurothrixus guimaraesi Costa Lima, 1942
- Aleurothrixus interrogationis Bemis, 1904
- Aleurothrixus lucumai Costa Lima, 1942
- Aleurothrixus miconiae Hempel, 1922
- Aleurothrixus myrtacei Bondar, 1923
- Aleurothrixus myrtifolii Bondar, 1923
- Aleurothrixus ondinae Bondar, 1923
- Aleurothrixus porteri Quaintance & Baker, 1916
- Aleurothrixus proximans Bondar, 1923
- Aleurothrixus silvestris Corbett, 1935
- Aleurothrixus similis Sampson & Drews, 1941
- Aleurothrixus smilaceti Takahashi, 1934
- Aleurothrixus solani Bondar, 1923

- Aleurotithius Quaintance & Baker, 1914

- Aleurotithius mexicanus Russell, 1947
- Aleurotithius timberlakei Quaintance & Baker, 1914

- Aleurotrachelus Quaintance & Baker, 1914

- Aleurotrachelus alpinus Takahashi, 1940
- Aleurotrachelus ambrensis Takahashi & Mamet, 1952
- Aleurotrachelus ampullatus Bink-Moenen, 1983
- Aleurotrachelus anonae Corbett, 1935
- Aleurotrachelus asparagi Lewis, 1893
- Aleurotrachelus atratus Hempel, 1922
- Aleurotrachelus brazzavillense Cohic, 1968
- Aleurotrachelus camamuensis Bondar, 1923
- Aleurotrachelus camelliae Kuwana, 1911
- Aleurotrachelus chikungensis Mound & Halsey, 1978
- Aleurotrachelus corbetti Takahashi, 1941
- Aleurotrachelus debregeasiae Young, 1944
- Aleurotrachelus distinctus Hempel, 1922
- Aleurotrachelus dryandrae Solomon, 1935
- Aleurotrachelus duplicatus Bink-Moenen, 1983
- Aleurotrachelus elatostemae Takahashi, 1932
- Aleurotrachelus eriosemae Hempel, 1922
- Aleurotrachelus erythrinae Corbett, 1935
- Aleurotrachelus euphorifoliae Young, 1944
- Aleurotrachelus fenestellae Hempel, 1922
- Aleurotrachelus filamentosus Takahashi, 1938
- Aleurotrachelus fissistigmae Takahashi, 1931
- Aleurotrachelus globulariae Goux, 1942
- Aleurotrachelus granosus Bondar, 1923
- Aleurotrachelus gratiosus Bondar, 1923
- Aleurotrachelus grewiae Takahashi, 1952
- Aleurotrachelus hazomiavonae Takahashi, 1955
- Aleurotrachelus ingafolii Bondar, 1923
- Aleurotrachelus ishigakiensis Takahashi, 1933
- Aleurotrachelus joholensis Corbett, 1935
- Aleurotrachelus juiyunensis Young, 1944
- Aleurotrachelus limbatus Maskell, 1896
- Aleurotrachelus longispinus Corbett, 1926
- Aleurotrachelus lumpurensis Corbett, 1935
- Aleurotrachelus machili Takahashi, 1942
- Aleurotrachelus madagascariensis Takahashi, 1955
- Aleurotrachelus maesae Takahashi, 1935
- Aleurotrachelus marginata Newstead, 1911
- Aleurotrachelus mauritiensis Takahashi, 1940
- Aleurotrachelus mesuae Corbett, 1935
- Aleurotrachelus minimus Young, 1944
- Aleurotrachelus minutus Takahashi, 1952
- Aleurotrachelus multipapillus Singh, 1932
- Aleurotrachelus nivetae Cohic, 1969
- Aleurotrachelus obscurus Bink-Moenen, 1983
- Aleurotrachelus orchidicola Takahashi, 1939
- Aleurotrachelus oriani Martin & Mound, 2007
- Aleurotrachelus pandani Takahashi, 1951
- Aleurotrachelus papilliferus Sampson & Drews, 1941
- Aleurotrachelus parvus Hempel, 1899
- Aleurotrachelus pauliani Takahashi, 1960
- Aleurotrachelus plectroniae Takahashi, 1955
- Aleurotrachelus primitus Young, 1944
- Aleurotrachelus pyracanthae Takahashi, 1935
- Aleurotrachelus reunionensis Takahashi, 1960
- Aleurotrachelus rhamnicola Goux, 1940
- Aleurotrachelus rosarius Bondar, 1923
- Aleurotrachelus rotundus Corbett, 1935
- Aleurotrachelus rubi Takahashi, 1933
- Aleurotrachelus rubromaculatus Bondar, 1923
- Aleurotrachelus selangorensis Corbett, 1935
- Aleurotrachelus serratus Takahashi, 1949
- Aleurotrachelus socialis Bondar, 1923
- Aleurotrachelus souliei Cohic, 1969
- Aleurotrachelus stypheliae Maskell, 1896
- Aleurotrachelus taiwanus Takahashi, 1932
- Aleurotrachelus tarennae Bink-Moenen, 1983
- Aleurotrachelus theobromae Bondar, 1923
- Aleurotrachelus tracheifer Quaintance, 1900
- Aleurotrachelus trachoides Back, 1912
- Aleurotrachelus tuberculatus Singh, 1933
- Aleurotrachelus urticicola Young, 1944
- Aleurotrachelus vitis Corbett, 1935
- Aleurotrachelus zonatus Takahashi, 1952

- Aleurotuba Tremblay & Iaccarino, 1978

- Aleurotuba replaced by Aleurotuba Tremblay & Iaccarino, 1978.
- Aleurotuba jelinekii Frauenfeld, 1867

- Aleurotulus Quaintance & Baker, 1914

- Aleurotulus anthuricola Nakahara, 1989
- Aleurotulus arundinacea Singh, 1931
- Aleurotulus laneus Martin, 2005
- Aleurotulus mundururu Bondar, 1923
- Aleurotulus nephrolepidis Quaintance, 1900
- Aleurotulus pteridophytae Martin in Mound, Martin & Polaszek, 1994

- Aleuroviggianus Iaccarino, 1982

- Aleuroviggianus adanaensis Bink-Moenen, 1992
- Aleuroviggianus adrianae Iaccarino, 1982
- Aleuroviggianus graecus Bink-Moenen, 1992
- Aleuroviggianus halperini Bink-Moenen, 1992
- Aleuroviggianus polymorphus Bink-Moenen, 1992
- Aleuroviggianus zonalus Bink-Moenen, 1992

- Aleurovitreus Martin, 2005

- Aleurovitreus insignis Bondar, 1923
- Aleurovitreus risor Martin, 2005

- Aleyrodes Latreille, 1796

- Aleyrodes albescens Hempel, 1922
- Aleyrodes amnicola Bemis, 1904
- Aleyrodes asari Schrank, 1801
- Aleyrodes asarumis Shimer, 1867
- Aleyrodes aureocincta Cockerell, 1897
- Aleyrodes baja Sampson, 1943
- Aleyrodes ciliatus Takahashi, 1955
- Aleyrodes crataegi Kiriukhin, 1947
- Aleyrodes diasemus Bemis, 1904
- Aleyrodes elevatus Silvestri, 1934
- Aleyrodes essigi Penny, 1922
- Aleyrodes fodiens Maskell, 1896
- Aleyrodes gossypii Fitch, 1857
- Aleyrodes hyperici Corbett, 1926
- Aleyrodes japonicus Takahashi, 1963
- Aleyrodes lacteus Zehntner, 1897
- Aleyrodes latus Hempel, 1922
- Aleyrodes lonicerae Walker, 1852
- Aleyrodes millettiae Cohic, 1968
- Aleyrodes osmaroniae Sampson, 1945
- Aleyrodes philadelphi Danzig, 1966
- Aleyrodes proletella Linnaeus, 1758
- Aleyrodes pruinosus Bemis, 1904
- Aleyrodes pyrolae Gillette & Baker, 1895
- Aleyrodes shizuokensis Kuwana, 1911
- Aleyrodes singularis Danzig, 1966
- Aleyrodes sorini Takahashi, 1958
- Aleyrodes spiraeoides Quaintance, 1900
- Aleyrodes taiheisanus Takahashi, 1939
- Aleyrodes takahashii Ossiannilsson, 1966
- Aleyrodes tinaeoides Blanchard, 1852
- Aleyrodes winterae Takahashi, 1937
- Aleyrodes zygia Danzig, 1966

- Aleyrodiella Danzig, 1966

- Aleyrodiella lamellifera Danzig, 1966

- Anomaleyrodes Takahashi & Mamet, 1952

- Anomaleyrodes palmae Takahashi & Mamet, 1952

- Apobemisia Takahashi, 1954

- Apobemisia celti Takahashi, 1932
- Apobemisia kuwanai Takahashi, 1934

- Arachnaleyrodes Bink-Moenen, 1983

- Arachnaleyrodes insignis Bink-Moenen, 1983

- Asialeyrodes Corbett, 1935

- Asialeyrodes corbetti Takahashi, 1949
- Asialeyrodes dorsidemarcata Singh, 1932
- Asialeyrodes dubius Martin & Mound, 2007
- Asialeyrodes elegans Meganathan & David, 1994
- Asialeyrodes euphoriae Takahashi, 1942
- Asialeyrodes indica Sundararaj & David, 1992
- Asialeyrodes lumpurensis Corbett, 1935
- Asialeyrodes lushanensis Ko in Ko, Hsu & Wu, 1993
- Asialeyrodes maesae Takahashi, 1934
- Asialeyrodes meghalayensis Regu & David, 1992
- Asialeyrodes menoni Meganathan & David, 1994
- Asialeyrodes multipori Takahashi, 1942
- Asialeyrodes papillatus Regu & David, 1992
- Asialeyrodes saklespurensis Regu & David, 1993
- Asialeyrodes selangorensis Corbett, 1935
- Asialeyrodes sphaerica Sundararaj & Dubey, 2006
- Asialeyrodes splendens Meganathan & David, 1994

- Asterobemisia Trehan, 1940

- Asterobemisia atraphaxius Danzig, 1969
- Asterobemisia carpini Koch, 1857
- Asterobemisia curvata Qureshi, 1981
- Asterobemisia dentata Danzig, 1969
- Asterobemisia lata Danzig, 1966
- Asterobemisia obenbergeri Zahradnik, 1961
- Asterobemisia paveli Zahradnik, 1961
- Asterobemisia salicaria Danzig, 1969
- Asterobemisia silvatica Danzig, 1964
- Asterobemisia takahashii Danzig, 1966
- Asterobemisia trifolii Danzig, 1966
- Asterobemisia yanagicola Takahashi, 1934

- Asterochiton Maskell, 1879

- Asterochiton aureus Maskell, 1879
- Asterochiton auricolor Bondar, 1923
- Asterochiton cerata Maskell, 1896
- Asterochiton cordiae David & Subramaniam, 1976
- Asterochiton fagi Maskell, 1890
- Asterochiton pittospori Dumbleton, 1957
- Asterochiton simplex Maskell, 1890

- Axacalia Danzig, 1969

- Axacalia spiraeanthi Danzig, 1969

- Bellitudo Russell, 1943

- Bellitudo campae Russell, 1943
- Bellitudo cubae Russell, 1943
- Bellitudo hispaniolae Russell, 1943
- Bellitudo jamaicae Russell, 1943

- Bemisaleyrodes Cohic, 1969

- Bemisaleyrodes balachowskyi Cohic, 1969
- Bemisaleyrodes brideliae Bink-Moenen, 1983
- Bemisaleyrodes grjebinei Cohic, 1968
- Bemisaleyrodes pauliani Cohic, 1969

- Bemisia Quaintance & Baker, 1914

- Bemisia afer Priesner & Hosny, 1934
- Bemisia alni Takahashi, 1957
- Bemisia antennata Gameel, 1968
- Bemisia bambusae Takahashi, 1942
- Bemisia berbericola Cockerell, 1896
- Bemisia capitata Regu & David, 1991
- Bemisia caudasculptura Quaintance & Baker, 1937
- Bemisia centroamericana Martin, 2005
- Bemisia combreticula Bink-Moenen, 1983
- Bemisia confusa Danzig, 1964
- Bemisia cordylinidis Dumbleton, 1961
- Bemisia decipiens Maskell, 1896
- Bemisia elliptica Takahashi, 1960
- Bemisia flocculosa Gill & Holder, 2011
- Bemisia formosana Takahashi, 1933
- Bemisia giffardi Kotinsky, 1907
- Bemisia gigantea Martin, 1999
- Bemisia grossa Singh, 1931
- Bemisia guierae Bink-Moenen, 1983
- Bemisia hirta Bink-Moenen, 1983
- Bemisia lampangensis Takahashi, 1942
- Bemisia lauracea Martin, Aguiar & Pita, 1996
- Bemisia leakii Peal, 1903
- Bemisia medinae Gomez-Menor, 1954
- Bemisia mesasiatica Danzig, 1969
- Bemisia moringae David & Subramaniam, 1976
- Bemisia multituberculata Sundararaj & David, 1990
- Bemisia ovata Goux, 1940
- Bemisia poinsettiae Hempel, 1922
- Bemisia pongamiae Takahashi, 1931
- Bemisia porteri Corbett, 1935
- Bemisia psiadiae Takahashi, 1955
- Bemisia puerariae Takahashi, 1955
- Bemisia religiosa Peal, 1903
- Bemisia shinanoensis Kuwana, 1922
- Bemisia spiraeae Young, 1944
- Bemisia spiraeoides Mound & Halsey, 1978
- Bemisia subdecipiens Martin, 1999
- Bemisia sugonjaevi Danzig, 1969
- Bemisia tabaci Gennadius, 1889
- Bemisia tuberculata Bondar, 1923

- Bemisiella Danzig, 1966

- Bemisiella artemisiae Danzig, 1966
- Bemisiella lespedezae Danzig, 1966

- Brazzaleyrodes Cohic, 1966

- Brazzaleyrodes eriococciformis Cohic, 1966

- Bulgarialeurodes Corbett, 1936

- Bulgarialeurodes cotesii Maskell, 1896

- Calluneyrodes Zahradnik, 1961

- Calluneyrodes callunae Ossiannilsson, 1947

- Chitonaleyrodes Martin, 1999

- Chitonaleyrodes canberrensis Martin, 1999

- Cockerelliella Sundararaj & David, 1992

- Cockerelliella adinandrae Corbett, 1935
- Cockerelliella bladhiae Takahashi, 1931
- Cockerelliella curcumae Corbett, 1935
- Cockerelliella dehradunensis Jesudasan & David, 1991
- Cockerelliella dioscoreae Sundararaj & David, 1992
- Cockerelliella indica Sundararaj & David, 1992
- Cockerelliella karmardini Corbett, 1935
- Cockerelliella lumpurensis Corbett, 1935
- Cockerelliella meghalayensis Sundararaj & David, 1992
- Cockerelliella psidii Corbett, 1935
- Cockerelliella quaintancei Sundararaj & David, 1992
- Cockerelliella rhodamniae Corbett, 1935
- Cockerelliella rotunda Regu & David, 1993
- Cockerelliella sembilanensis Corbett, 1935
- Cockerelliella somnathensis Sundararaj, 2000
- Cockerelliella splendens Meganathan & David, 1994
- Cockerelliella zingiberae Sundararaj & David, 1992

- Cohicaleyrodes Bink-Moenen, 1983

- Cohicaleyrodes alternans Cohic, 1966
- Cohicaleyrodes blanzyi Cohic, 1968
- Cohicaleyrodes crossopterygis Bink-Moenen, 1983
- Cohicaleyrodes descarpentriesi Cohic, 1968
- Cohicaleyrodes elongatus Meganathan & David, 1994
- Cohicaleyrodes indicus David & Selvakumaran, 1987
- Cohicaleyrodes jesudasani David, 2005
- Cohicaleyrodes mappiae Selvakumaran & David, 1996
- Cohicaleyrodes obscura Bink-Moenen, 1983
- Cohicaleyrodes padminiae Phillips & Jesudasan in David, Jesudasan & Phillips, 2006
- Cohicaleyrodes pauliani Cohic, 1968
- Cohicaleyrodes platysepali Cohic, 1966
- Cohicaleyrodes quadrilongispinae Bink-Moenen, 1983
- Cohicaleyrodes recurvispinus Cohic, 1966
- Cohicaleyrodes saklespurensis Regu & David, 1992
- Cohicaleyrodes uvariae Cohic, 1968

- Combesaleyrodes Cohic, 1966

- Combesaleyrodes bouqueti Cohic, 1966
- Combesaleyrodes tauffliebi Cohic, 1966

- Corbettia Dozier, 1934

- Corbettia bauhiniae Cohic, 1968
- Corbettia graminis Mound, 1965
- Corbettia grandis Russell, 1960
- Corbettia isoberliniae Bink-Moenen, 1983
- Corbettia lamottei Cohic, 1969
- Corbettia lonchocarpi Bink-Moenen, 1983
- Corbettia millettiacola Dozier, 1934
- Corbettia pauliani Cohic, 1966
- Corbettia tamarindi Takahashi, 1951

- Crenidorsum Russell, 1945

- Crenidorsum discussion of C. rubiae, below. Syn. nov.
- Crenidorsum armatae Russell, 1945
- Crenidorsum aroidephagus Martin & Aguiar in Martin, Aguiar & Baufeld, 2001
- Crenidorsum binkae Jesudasan & David, 1991
- Crenidorsum caerulescens Singh, 1931
- Crenidorsum celebes Martin, 1988
- Crenidorsum cinnamomi Jesudasan & David, 1991
- Crenidorsum coimbatorensis David & Subramaniam, 1976
- Crenidorsum commune Russell, 1945
- Crenidorsum debordae Russell, 1945
- Crenidorsum diaphanum Russell, 1945
- Crenidorsum differens Russell, 1945
- Crenidorsum goaensis Jesudasan & David, 1991
- Crenidorsum lasangensis Martin, 1985
- Crenidorsum leve Russell, 1945
- Crenidorsum magnisetae Russell, 1945
- Crenidorsum malpighiae Russell, 1945
- Crenidorsum marginale Russell, 1945
- Crenidorsum micheliae Takahashi, 1932
- Crenidorsum millennium Martin, 1999
- Crenidorsum morobensis Martin, 1985
- Crenidorsum ornatum Russell, 1945
- Crenidorsum pykarae Jesudasan & David, 1991
- Crenidorsum rubiae P. M. M. David, 2000
- Crenidorsum russellae P. M. M David & B. V. David, 2000
- Crenidorsum stigmaphylli Russell, 1945
- Crenidorsum tuberculatum Russell, 1945
- Crenidorsum turpiniae Takahashi, 1932
- Crenidorsum wendlandiae Jesudasan & David, 1991

- Crescentaleyrodes David & Jesudasan, 1987

- Crescentaleyrodes fumipennis Hempel, 1899
- Crescentaleyrodes monodi Cohic, 1969
- Crescentaleyrodes paulianae Cohic, 1969
- Crescentaleyrodes semilunaris Corbett, 1926
- Crescentaleyrodes vetiveriae Dubey & Ko, 2006

- Cryptolingula Martin & Carver, 1999

- Cryptolingula perplexa Martin & Carver in Martin, 1999

- Davidiella Dubey & Sundararaj, 2005

- Davidiella cinnamomi Dubey & Sundararaj, 2005

- Dialeurodes Cockerell, 1902

- Dialeurodes abbotabadiensis Qureshi, 1980
- Dialeurodes adinobotris Corbett, 1935
- Dialeurodes agalmae Takahashi, 1935
- Dialeurodes angulata Corbett, 1935
- Dialeurodes anjumi Qureshi, 1980
- Dialeurodes ara Corbett, 1935
- Dialeurodes armatus David & Subramaniam, 1976
- Dialeurodes ayyanarensis Sundararaj & David, 1991
- Dialeurodes bancoensis Ardaillon & Cohic, 1970
- Dialeurodes bangkokana Takahashi, 1942
- Dialeurodes bicornicauda Martin, 1999
- Dialeurodes binkae Sundararaj & David, 1991
- Dialeurodes biventralis Sundararaj & David, 1991
- Dialeurodes buscki Quaintance & Baker, 1917
- Dialeurodes canthiae Sundararaj & David, 1991
- Dialeurodes celti Takahashi, 1942
- Dialeurodes cephalidistinctus Singh, 1932
- Dialeurodes cerifera Quaintance & Baker, 1917
- Dialeurodes chiengsenana Takahashi, 1942
- Dialeurodes cinnamomi Takahashi, 1932
- Dialeurodes cinnamomicola Takahashi, 1937
- Dialeurodes citri Ashmead, 1885
- Dialeurodes citricola Young, 1942
- Dialeurodes conocephali Corbett, 1935
- Dialeurodes crescentata Corbett, 1935
- Dialeurodes cyathispinifera Corbett, 1933
- Dialeurodes daphniphylli Takahashi, 1932
- Dialeurodes davidi Mound & Halsey, 1978
- Dialeurodes decaspermi Martin, 1985
- Dialeurodes delhiensis David & Sundararaj, 1992
- Dialeurodes denticulatus Bondar, 1923
- Dialeurodes dicksoni Corbett, 1935
- Dialeurodes didymocarpi Corbett, 1935
- Dialeurodes dissimilis Quaintance & Baker, 1917
- Dialeurodes distincta Corbett, 1933
- Dialeurodes drypetesi nomen novum.
- Dialeurodes dubia Corbett, 1935
- Dialeurodes dumbeaensis Dumbleton, 1961
- Dialeurodes egregissima Sampson & Drews, 1941
- Dialeurodes emarginata Mound, 1965
- Dialeurodes endospermae Corbett, 1935
- Dialeurodes evodiae Corbett, 1935
- Dialeurodes ficicola Takahashi, 1935
- Dialeurodes gardeniae Corbett, 1935
- Dialeurodes gemurohensis Corbett, 1935
- Dialeurodes gigantica Sundararaj & David, 1991
- Dialeurodes glutae Corbett, 1935
- Dialeurodes granulata Sundararaj & David, 1991
- Dialeurodes greenwoodi Corbett, 1936
- Dialeurodes heterocera Bondar, 1923
- Dialeurodes hexpuncta Singh, 1932
- Dialeurodes hongkongensis Takahashi, 1941
- Dialeurodes icfreae Sundararaj & Dubey, 2003
- Dialeurodes imperialis Bondar, 1923
- Dialeurodes indicus David & Subramaniam, 1976
- Dialeurodes ixorae Singh, 1931
- Dialeurodes joholensis Corbett, 1935
- Dialeurodes kepongensis Corbett, 1935
- Dialeurodes keralaensis Meganathan & David, 1994
- Dialeurodes kirkaldyi Kotinsky, 1907
- Dialeurodes kumargiriensis Sundararaj & Dubey, 2006
- Dialeurodes lithocarpi Takahashi, 1931
- Dialeurodes loranthi Corbett, 1926
- Dialeurodes machilicola Takahashi, 1942
- Dialeurodes maculatus Bondar, 1928
- Dialeurodes maculipennis Bondar, 1923
- Dialeurodes mahableshwarensis Sundararaj & David, 1998
- Dialeurodes martini Sundararaj & David, 1991
- Dialeurodes maxima Quaintance & Baker, 1917
- Dialeurodes minahassai Martin, 1988
- Dialeurodes mirabilis Takahashi, 1942
- Dialeurodes musae Corbett, 1935
- Dialeurodes nagpurensis Sundararaj & David, 1991
- Dialeurodes natickis Baker & Moles, 1921
- Dialeurodes navarroi Bondar, 1928
- Dialeurodes nigeriae Cohic, 1966
- Dialeurodes octoplicata Corbett, 1935
- Dialeurodes ouchii Takahashi, 1937
- Dialeurodes oweni Singh, 1932
- Dialeurodes palmata Sundararaj & David, 1991
- Dialeurodes panacis Corbett, 1935
- Dialeurodes papulae Singh, 1932
- Dialeurodes pauliani Cohic, 1966
- Dialeurodes philippinensis Takahashi, 1936
- Dialeurodes pilahensis Corbett, 1935
- Dialeurodes platicus Bondar, 1923
- Dialeurodes polymorpha Bink-Moenen, 1983
- Dialeurodes pseudocitri Takahashi, 1942
- Dialeurodes psychotriae Dumbleton, 1961
- Dialeurodes punctata Corbett, 1933
- Dialeurodes radiilinealis Quaintance & Baker, 1917
- Dialeurodes radiipuncta Quaintance & Baker, 1917
- Dialeurodes ramadeviae Dubey & Sundararaj, 2004
- Dialeurodes rangooni Singh, 1932
- Dialeurodes razalyi Corbett, 1935
- Dialeurodes rempangensis Takahashi, 1949
- Dialeurodes rengas Corbett, 1935
- Dialeurodes reticulosa Corbett, 1935
- Dialeurodes rotunda Singh, 1931
- Dialeurodes rubiphaga Dubey & Sundararaj, 2004
- Dialeurodes russellae Sundararaj & David, 1991
- Dialeurodes saklaspurensis David, 1976
- Dialeurodes saklespurensis Regu & David, 1993
- Dialeurodes sandorici Corbett, 1935
- Dialeurodes sepangensis Corbett, 1935
- Dialeurodes sheryli P. M. M. David, 2000
- Dialeurodes shintenensis Takahashi, 1933
- Dialeurodes shoreae Corbett, 1933
- Dialeurodes siemriepensis Takahashi, 1942
- Dialeurodes simmondsi Corbett, 1927
- Dialeurodes striata Corbett, 1935
- Dialeurodes struthanthi Hempel, 1901
- Dialeurodes sundararajani Sundararaj & Dubey, 2006
- Dialeurodes tanakai Takahashi, 1942
- Dialeurodes townsendi Quaintance & Baker, 1917
- Dialeurodes tricolor Quaintance & Baker, 1917
- Dialeurodes tuberculosa Corbett, 1935
- Dialeurodes turpiniae Meganathan & David, 1994
- Dialeurodes vitis Corbett, 1935
- Dialeurodes vulgaris Singh, 1931
- Dialeurodes wendlandiae Meganathan & David, 1994
- Dialeurodes yercaudensis Jesudasan & David, 1991

- Dialeurolobus Danzig, 1964

- Dialeurolobus erythrinae Corbett, 1935
- Dialeurolobus pulcher Danzig, 1964
- Dialeurolobus rhamni Bink-Moenen in Bink-Moenen & Gerling, 1992

- Dialeurolonga Dozier, 1928

- Dialeurolonga elevated to generic rank by Takahashi, 1951
- Dialeurolonga africana Newstead, 1921
- Dialeurolonga agauriae Takahashi, 1951
- Dialeurolonga ambilaensis Takahashi, 1955
- Dialeurolonga angustata Takahashi, 1961
- Dialeurolonga aphloiae Takahashi, 1955
- Dialeurolonga bambusae Takahashi, 1961
- Dialeurolonga bambusicola Takahashi, 1951
- Dialeurolonga brevispina Takahashi, 1951
- Dialeurolonga communis Bink-Moenen, 1983
- Dialeurolonga davidi Dubey & Sundararaj, 2006
- Dialeurolonga elliptica Takahashi, 1955
- Dialeurolonga elongata Dozier, 1928
- Dialeurolonga erythroxylonis Takahashi, 1955
- Dialeurolonga eugeniae Takahashi, 1951
- Dialeurolonga graminis Takahashi, 1951
- Dialeurolonga guettardae Martin, 2005
- Dialeurolonga hoyti Mound, 1965
- Dialeurolonga kumargiriensis Dubey & Sundararaj, 2006
- Dialeurolonga lagerstroemiae Jesudasan & David, 1991
- Dialeurolonga lamtoensis Cohic, 1969
- Dialeurolonga lata Takahashi, 1955
- Dialeurolonga maculata Singh, 1931
- Dialeurolonga malleshwaramensis Sundararaj, 2001
- Dialeurolonga mameti Takahashi, 1955
- Dialeurolonga mauritiensis Takahashi, 1938
- Dialeurolonga milloti Takahashi, 1951
- Dialeurolonga multipapilla Takahashi, 1955
- Dialeurolonga multipori Dubey & Sundararaj, 2006
- Dialeurolonga multituberculata Dubey & Sundararaj, 2006
- Dialeurolonga nemoralis Bink-Moenen, 1983
- Dialeurolonga nigra Takahashi & Mamet, 1952
- Dialeurolonga operculobata Martin & Carver in Martin, 1999
- Dialeurolonga paradoxa Takahashi, 1955
- Dialeurolonga paucipapillata Cohic, 1969
- Dialeurolonga pauliani Takahashi, 1951
- Dialeurolonga perinetensis Takahashi & Mamet, 1952
- Dialeurolonga phyllarthronis Takahashi, 1955
- Dialeurolonga pseudocephalidistincta Dubey & Sundararaj, 2006
- Dialeurolonga ravensarae Takahashi & Mamet, 1952
- Dialeurolonga rhamni Takahashi, 1961
- Dialeurolonga robinsoni Takahashi & Mamet, 1952
- Dialeurolonga rotunda Takahashi, 1961
- Dialeurolonga rusostigmoides Martin, 1999
- Dialeurolonga similis Takahashi, 1955
- Dialeurolonga simplex Takahashi, 1955
- Dialeurolonga strychnosicola Cohic, 1966
- Dialeurolonga subrotunda Takahashi, 1955
- Dialeurolonga swainei Martin, 1999
- Dialeurolonga takahashii David & Jesudasan 1989
- Dialeurolonga tambourissae Takahashi, 1955
- Dialeurolonga tenella Takahashi, 1961
- Dialeurolonga trialeuroides Takahashi & Mamet, 1952
- Dialeurolonga vendranae Takahashi, 1961

- Dialeuropora Quaintance & Baker, 1917

- Dialeuropora bipunctata Corbett, 1933
- Dialeuropora brideliae Takahashi, 1932
- Dialeuropora centrosemae Corbett, 1935
- Dialeuropora congoensis Cohic, 1966
- Dialeuropora decempuncta Quaintance & Baker, 1917
- Dialeuropora hassensanensis Takahashi, 1934
- Dialeuropora heptapora Regu & David, 1992
- Dialeuropora holboelliae Young, 1944
- Dialeuropora indochinensis Takahashi, 1942
- Dialeuropora jendera Corbett, 1935
- Dialeuropora langsat Corbett, 1935
- Dialeuropora malayensis Corbett, 1935
- Dialeuropora mangiferae Corbett, 1935
- Dialeuropora murrayae Takahashi, 1931
- Dialeuropora papillata Cohic, 1966
- Dialeuropora photiniana Chen, 1997
- Dialeuropora portugaliae Cohic, 1966
- Dialeuropora pterolobiae David & Subramaniam, 1976
- Dialeuropora silvarum Corbett, 1935
- Dialeuropora urticata Young, 1944
- Dialeuropora viburni Takahashi, 1933

- Dialeurotrachelus Takahashi, 1942

- Dialeurotrachelus cambodiensis Takahashi, 1942

- Disiphon Russell, 1993

- Disiphon dubienus Bondar, 1923
- Disiphon russellae Martin, 2005

- Distinctaleyrodes Dubey & Sundararaj, 2006

- Distinctaleyrodes setosus Dubey & Sundararaj, 2006

- Dothioia Dumbleton, 1961

- Dothioia bidentatus Dumbleton, 1961

- Dumbletoniella Jesudasan & David, 1990

- Dumbletoniella callistemoni Martin, 1999
- Dumbletoniella ellipticae Dumbleton, 1956
- Dumbletoniella eucalypti Dumbleton, 1957
- Dumbletoniella pittospori Martin & Carver in Martin, 1999
- Dumbletoniella rotunda Martin & Carver in Martin, 1999
- Dumbletoniella xanthorrhoeae Martin, 1999

- Editaaleyrodes David, 2005

- Editaaleyrodes indicus David, 2005

- Extensaleyrodes Bink-Moenen, 1983

- Extensaleyrodes akureensis Mound, 1965
- Extensaleyrodes falcata Bink-Moenen, 1983

- Fascaleyrodes Bink-Moenen, 1983

- Fascaleyrodes palmae Gameel, 1968
- Fascaleyrodes rara Bink-Moenen, 1983

- Filicaleyrodes Takahashi, 1962

- Filicaleyrodes bosseri Takahashi, 1962
- Filicaleyrodes williamsi Trehan, 1938

- Fippataleyrodes Sundararaj & David, 1992

- Fippataleyrodes cinnamomi Dubey & Sundararaj, 2005
- Fippataleyrodes indica Sundararaj & David, 1992
- Fippataleyrodes litseae Sundararaj & David, 1992
- Fippataleyrodes multipori Dubey & Sundararaj, 2005
- Fippataleyrodes yellapurensis Dubey & Sundararaj, 2005

- Gagudjuia Martin, 1999

- Gagudjuia allosyncarpiae Martin, 1999

- Gomenella Dumbleton, 1961

- Gomenella dryandrae Takahashi, 1950
- Gomenella multipora Dumbleton, 1961
- Gomenella reflexa Dumbleton, 1961

- Harpaleyrodes Bink-Moenen, 1983

- Harpaleyrodes, tuberculata Bink-Moenen, 1983

- Hesperaleyrodes Sampson, 1943

- Hesperaleyrodes michoacanensis Sampson, 1943

- Heteraleyrodes Takahashi, 1942

- Heteraleyrodes bambusae Takahashi, 1942
- Heteraleyrodes bambusicola Takahashi, 1951

- Heterobemisia Takahashi, 1957

- Heterobemisia alba Takahashi, 1957

- Indoaleyrodes David & Subramaniam, 1976

- Indoaleyrodes glochidioni Martin & Carver in Martin, 1999
- Indoaleyrodes laos Takahashi, 1942
- Indoaleyrodes pseudoculatus Martin, 1985
- Indoaleyrodes reticulata Dumbleton, 1961

- Juglasaleyrodes Cohic, 1966

- Juglasaleyrodes orstomensis Cohic, 1966

- Keralaleyrodes Meganathan & David, 1994

- Keralaleyrodes indicus Meganathan & David, 1994

- Laingiella Corbett, 1926

- Laingiella bambusae Corbett, 1926

- Leucopogonella Dumbleton, 1961

- Leucopogonella apectenata Dumbleton, 1961
- Leucopogonella pallida Dumbleton, 1961
- Leucopogonella simila Dumbleton, 1961
- Leucopogonella sinuata Dumbleton, 1961

- Lipaleyrodes Takahashi, 1962

- Lipaleyrodes atriplex Froggatt, 1911
- Lipaleyrodes breyniae Singh, 1931
- Lipaleyrodes crossandrae David & Subramaniam, 1976
- Lipaleyrodes emiliae Chen & Ko, 2006
- Lipaleyrodes euphorbiae David & Subramaniam, 1976
- Lipaleyrodes hargreavesi Corbett, 1935
- Lipaleyrodes leguminicola Takahashi, 1942
- Lipaleyrodes phyllanthi Takahashi, 1962
- Lipaleyrodes vernoniae David & Thenmozhi, 1995

- Malayaleyrodes Corbett, 1935

- Malayaleyrodes lumpurensis Corbett, 1935

- Marginaleyrodes Takahashi, 1961

- Marginaleyrodes fanalae Takahashi, 1951
- Marginaleyrodes fenestrata Takahashi, 1955
- Marginaleyrodes ixorae Takahashi, 1961
- Marginaleyrodes madagascariensis Takahashi, 1951
- Marginaleyrodes tsinjoarivona Takahashi, 1955

- Massilieurodes Goux, 1939

- Massilieurodes elevated to generic rank by Jensen, 2001
- Massilieurodes alabamensis Jensen, 2001
- Massilieurodes americanus Jensen, 2001
- Massilieurodes chittendeni Laing, 1928
- Massilieurodes curiosa Jensen, 2001
- Massilieurodes euryae Takahashi, 1940
- Massilieurodes fici Takahashi, 1932
- Massilieurodes formosensis Takahashi, 1933
- Massilieurodes homonoiae Jesudasan & David, 1991
- Massilieurodes kirishimensis Takahashi, 1963
- Massilieurodes monticola Takahashi, 1932
- Massilieurodes multipori Takahashi, 1932
- Massilieurodes myricae Jensen, 2001
- Massilieurodes rarasana Takahashi, 1934
- Massilieurodes sakaki Takahashi, 1958
- Massilieurodes setiger Goux, 1939

- Metabemisia Takahashi, 1963

- Metabemisia distylii Takahashi, 1963
- Metabemisia filicis Mound, 1967
- Metabemisia palawana Martin in Martin & Camus, 2001

- Metaleyrodes Sampson, 1943

- Metaleyrodes oceanica Takahashi, 1939

- Minutaleyrodes Jesudasan & David, 1990

- Minutaleyrodes cherasensis Corbett, 1935
- Minutaleyrodes indicus Meganathan & David, 1994
- Minutaleyrodes kolliensis David, 1977
- Minutaleyrodes minuta Singh, 1931
- Minutaleyrodes suishanus Takahashi, 1934

- Mixaleyrodes Takahashi, 1936

- Mixaleyrodes polypodicola Takahashi, 1963
- Mixaleyrodes polystichi Takahashi, 1936

- Nealeyrodes Hempel, 1922

- Nealeyrodes bonariensis Hempel, 1922

- Neoaleurodes Bondar, 1923

- Neoaleurodes clandestinus Bondar, 1923

- Neoaleurotrachelus Takahashi & Mamet, 1952

- Neoaleurotrachelus aphloiae Takahashi & Mamet, 1952
- Neoaleurotrachelus bertilloni Cohic, 1966
- Neoaleurotrachelus graberi Cohic, 1968
- Neoaleurotrachelus sudaniensis Gameel, 1968

- Neomaskellia Quaintance & Baker, 1913

- Neomaskellia andropogonis Corbett, 1926
- Neomaskellia bergii Signoret, 1868

- Neopealius Takahashi, 1954

- Neopealius rubi Takahashi, 1954

- Nigrasialeyrodes Martin & Carver, 1999

- Nigrasialeyrodes convexus Martin & Carver in Martin, 1999

- Orchamoplatus Russell, 1958

- Orchamoplatus caledonicus Dumbleton, 1956
- Orchamoplatus calophylli Russell, 1958
- Orchamoplatus citri Takahashi, 1940
- Orchamoplatus dentatus Dumbleton, 1956
- Orchamoplatus dumbletoni Cohic, 1959
- Orchamoplatus incognitus Dumbleton, 1956
- Orchamoplatus louiserussellae Martin, 1999
- Orchamoplatus mammaeferus Quaintance & Baker, 1917
- Orchamoplatus montanus Dumbleton, 1956
- Orchamoplatus niuginii Martin, 1985
- Orchamoplatus noumeae Russell, 1958
- Orchamoplatus perdentatus Dumbleton, 1961
- Orchamoplatus plumensis Dumbleton, 1956
- Orchamoplatus porosus Dumbleton, 1956

- Orientaleyrodes David, 1993

- Orientaleyrodes indicus Regu & David, 1993
- Orientaleyrodes zeylanicus Corbett, 1926

- Orstomaleyrodes Cohic, 1966

- Orstomaleyrodes fimbriae Mound, 1965

- Papillipes Bink-Moenen, 1983

- Papillipes spinifer Bink-Moenen, 1983

- Parabemisia Takahashi, 1952

- Parabemisia aceris Takahashi, 1931
- Parabemisia indica Meganathan & David, 1994
- Parabemisia jawani Martin, 1985
- Parabemisia lushanensis Ko & Luo, 1999
- Parabemisia maculata Takahashi, 1952
- Parabemisia myricae Kuwana, 1927
- Parabemisia myrmecophila Martin, 1985

- Paraleurolobus Sampson & Drews, 1941

- Paraleurolobus chamaedoreae Russell, 1994
- Paraleurolobus imbricatus Sampson & Drews, 1941

- Paulianaleyrodes Cohic, 1966

- Paulianaleyrodes pauliani Cohic, 1966
- Paulianaleyrodes splendens Cohic, 1966
- Paulianaleyrodes tetracerae Cohic, 1966

- Pealius Quaintance & Baker, 1914

- Pealius akebiae Kuwana, 1911
- Pealius amamianus Takahashi, 1963
- Pealius artocarpi Corbett, 1935
- Pealius azaleae Baker & Moles, 1920
- Pealius bangkokensis Takahashi, 1942
- Pealius bengalensis Peal, 1903
- Pealius cambodiensis Takahashi, 1942
- Pealius chinensis Takahashi, 1941
- Pealius cinnamomi David & Sundararaj, 1991
- Pealius cryptus Martin, 1999
- Pealius damnacanthi Takahashi, 1935
- Pealius elatostemae Takahashi, 1932
- Pealius elongatus David, Sudararaj & Regu, 1991
- Pealius euryae Takahashi, 1955
- Pealius ezeigwi Mound, 1965
- Pealius fici Mound, 1965
- Pealius indicus David, 1972
- Pealius kalawi Singh, 1933
- Pealius kankoensis Takahashi, 1933
- Pealius kelloggi Bemis, 1904
- Pealius kongosana Takahashi, 1955
- Pealius liquidambari Takahashi, 1932
- Pealius longispinus Takahashi, 1932
- Pealius machili Takahashi, 1935
- Pealius maculatus Takahashi, 1942
- Pealius madeirensis Martin, Aguiar & Pita, 1996
- Pealius maskelli Bemis, 1904
- Pealius misrae Singh, 1931
- Pealius mitakensis Takahashi, 1955
- Pealius mori Takahashi, 1932
- Pealius nagerkoilensis Jesudasan & David, 1991
- Pealius nilgiriensis David, 1972
- Pealius polygoni Takahashi, 1934
- Pealius psychotriae Takahashi, 1935
- Pealius quercus Signoret, 1868
- Pealius rhododendri Takahashi, 1935
- Pealius rubi Takahashi, 1936
- Pealius sairandhryensis Meganathan & David, 1994
- Pealius schimae Takahashi, 1950
- Pealius setosus Danzig, 1964
- Pealius spinosus Jesudasan & David, 1991
- Pealius splendens David, Sudararaj & Regu, 1991
- Pealius sutepensis Takahashi, 1942
- Pealius tuberculatus Takahashi, 1942
- Pealius walayarensis Jesudasan & David, 1991

- Pectinaleyrodes Bink-Moenen, 1983

- Pectinaleyrodes culcasiae Cohic, 1969
- Pectinaleyrodes silvaticus Cohic, 1969
- Pectinaleyrodes triclisiae Cohic, 1966

- Pentaleyrodes Takahashi, 1937

- Pentaleyrodes cinnamomi Takahashi, 1932
- Pentaleyrodes hongkongensis Takahashi, 1941
- Pentaleyrodes linderae Chou & Yan, 1988
- Pentaleyrodes yasumatsui Takahashi, 1939

- Peracchius Lima & Racca-Filho, 2005

- Peracchius durantae Lima & Racca-Filho, 2005

- Plataleyrodes Takahashi & Mamet, 1952

- Plataleyrodes anthocleistae Takahashi & Mamet, 1952

- Pogonaleyrodes Takahashi, 1955

- Pogonaleyrodes fastuosa Takahashi, 1955
- Pogonaleyrodes zimmermanni Newstead, 1911

- Pseudaleurolobus Hempel, 1922

- Pseudaleurolobus jaboticabae Hempel, 1922

- Pseudaleuroplatus Martin, 1999

- Pseudaleuroplatus kiensis Martin, 1999
- Pseudaleuroplatus litseae Dumbleton, 1956

- Pseudaleyrodes Hempel, 1922

- Pseudaleyrodes depressus Hempel, 1922

- Pseudozaphanera Manzari, 2006

- Pseudozaphanera narendramodii Ragupathy & Radhakrishnan 2019
- Pseudozaphanera niger Maskell, 1896
- Pseudozaphanera papyrocarpae Martin in Bailey, Martin, Noyes & Austin, 2001
- Pseudozaphanera rhachisreticulata Martin, 1999
- Pseudozaphanera splendida Martin, 1999
- Pseudozaphanera wariensis Martin, 1999

- Ramsesseus Zahradnik, 1970

- Ramsesseus follioti Zahradnik, 1970

- Rhachisphora Quaintance & Baker, 1917

- Rhachisphora alishanensis Ko in Ko, Hsu & Wu, 1992
- Rhachisphora ardisiae Takahashi, 1935
- Rhachisphora capitatis Corbett, 1926
- Rhachisphora elongatus Regu & David, 1990
- Rhachisphora fijiensis Kotinsky, 1907
- Rhachisphora franksae Martin, 1999
- Rhachisphora indica Sundararaj & David, 1991
- Rhachisphora ixorae Sundararaj & David, 1991
- Rhachisphora kallarensis Jesudasan & David, 1991
- Rhachisphora koshunensis Takahashi, 1933
- Rhachisphora machili Takahashi, 1932
- Rhachisphora madhucae Jesudasan & David, 1991
- Rhachisphora maesae Takahashi, 1932
- Rhachisphora malayensis Takahashi, 1952
- Rhachisphora oblongata Ko, Wu & Chou, 1998
- Rhachisphora queenslandica Martin, 1999
- Rhachisphora reticulata Takahashi, 1933
- Rhachisphora rutherfordi Quaintance & Baker, 1917
- Rhachisphora sanhsianensis Ko in Ko, Hsu & Wu, 1992
- Rhachisphora selangorensis Corbett, 1933
- Rhachisphora setulosa Corbett, 1926
- Rhachisphora styraci Takahashi, 1934
- Rhachisphora taiwana Ko in Ko, Hsu & Wu, 1992
- Rhachisphora trilobitoides Quaintance & Baker, 1917

- Rosanovia Danzig, 1969

- Rosanovia hulthemiae Danzig, 1969

- Rugaleyrodes Bink-Moenen, 1983

- Rugaleyrodes angolensis Cohic, 1966
- Rugaleyrodes bidentata Bink-Moenen, 1983
- Rugaleyrodes tetracerae Cohic, 1966
- Rugaleyrodes villiersi Cohic, 1968
- Rugaleyrodes vuattouxi Cohic, 1969

- Rusostigma Quaintance & Baker, 1917

- Rusostigma eugeniae Maskell, 1896
- Rusostigma radiirugosa Quaintance & Baker, 1917
- Rusostigma tokyonis Kuwana, 1911
- Rusostigma tristylii Takahashi, 1935

- Russellaleyrodes David, 1973

- Russellaleyrodes cumiugum Singh, 1932

- Septaleurodicus Sampson, 1943

- Septaleurodicus mexicanus Sampson, 1943

- Setaleyrodes Takahashi, 1931

- Setaleyrodes litseae David & Sundararaj, 1991
- Setaleyrodes mirabilis Takahashi, 1931
- Setaleyrodes quercicola Takahashi, 1934
- Setaleyrodes takahashia Singh, 1933
- Setaleyrodes thretaonai David, 1981
- Setaleyrodes vigintiseta Martin, 1999

- Simplaleurodes Goux, 1945

- Simplaleurodes hemisphaerica Goux, 1945

- Singhiella Sampson, 1943

- Singhiella bassiae David & Subramaniam, 1976
- Singhiella bicolor Singh, 1931
- Singhiella brideliae Jesudasan & David, 1991
- Singhiella cambodiensis Takahashi, 1942
- Singhiella cardamomi David & Subramaniam, 1976
- Singhiella chinensis Takahashi, 1941
- Singhiella chitinosa Takahashi, 1937
- Singhiella citrifolii Morgan, 1893
- Singhiella crenulata Qureshi & Qayyam, 1969
- Singhiella delamarei Cohic, 1968
- Singhiella dioscoreae Takahashi, 1934
- Singhiella dipterocarpi Takahashi, 1942
- Singhiella elaeagni Takahashi, 1935
- Singhiella elbaensis Priesner & Hosny, 1934
- Singhiella ficifolii Takahashi, 1942
- Singhiella kuraruensis Takahashi, 1933
- Singhiella longisetae Chou & Yan, 1988
- Singhiella malabaricus Jesudasan & David, 1991
- Singhiella mekonensis Takahashi, 1942
- Singhiella melanolepis Chen & Ko, 2007
- Singhiella pallida Singh, 1931
- Singhiella piperis Takahashi, 1934
- Singhiella premnae Martin, 1999
- Singhiella serdangensis Corbett, 1935
- Singhiella simplex Singh, 1931
- Singhiella subrotunda Takahashi, 1935
- Singhiella sutepensis Takahashi, 1942
- Singhiella tetrastigmae Takahashi, 1934
- Singhiella vanieriae Takahashi, 1935

- Singhius Takahashi, 1932

- Singhius ehretiae Jesudasan & David, 1991
- Singhius hibisci Kotinsky, 1907
- Singhius morindae Sundararaj & David, 1992
- Singhius russellae David & Subramaniam, 1976

- Siphoninus Silvestri, 1915

- Siphoninus gruveli Cohic, 1968
- Siphoninus immaculatus Heeger, 1856
- Siphoninus phillyreae Haliday, 1835

- Sphericaleyrodes Selvakumaran & David, 1996

- Sphericaleyrodes bambusae Selvakumaran & David, 1996
- Sphericaleyrodes regui Dubey & Sundararaj, 2006

- Tegmaleurodes Martin, 2005

- Tegmaleurodes crustatus Bondar, 1928
- Tegmaleurodes integellus Bondar, 1923
- Tegmaleurodes lentus Martin, 2005

- Tetraleurodes Cockerell, 1902

- Tetraleurodes acaciae Quaintance, 1900
- Tetraleurodes adabicola Takahashi, 1955
- Tetraleurodes andropogoni Dozier, 1934
- Tetraleurodes bambusae Jesudasan & David, 1991
- Tetraleurodes banksiae Martin, 1999
- Tetraleurodes bararakae Takahashi, 1955
- Tetraleurodes bicolor Bink-Moenen in Bink-Moenen & Gerling, 1992
- Tetraleurodes bidentatus Sampson & Drews, 1941
- Tetraleurodes bireflexa Nakahara, 1995
- Tetraleurodes burliarensis Jesudasan & David, 1991
- Tetraleurodes cacaorum Bondar, 1923
- Tetraleurodes caulicola Nakahara, 1995
- Tetraleurodes chivela Nakahara, 1995
- Tetraleurodes confusa Nakahara, 1995
- Tetraleurodes contigua Sampson & Drews, 1941
- Tetraleurodes corni Haldeman, 1850
- Tetraleurodes cruzi Cassino, 1991
- Tetraleurodes dendrocalami Dubey & Sundararaj, 2005
- Tetraleurodes dorseyi Kirkaldy, 1907
- Tetraleurodes dorsirugosa Nakahara, 1995
- Tetraleurodes elaeocarpi Takahashi, 1950
- Tetraleurodes errans Bemis, 1904
- Tetraleurodes fici Quaintance & Baker, 1937
- Tetraleurodes ghesquierei Dozier, 1934
- Tetraleurodes graminis Takahashi, 1934
- Tetraleurodes granulata Bink-Moenen, 1983
- Tetraleurodes hederae Goux, 1939
- Tetraleurodes hirsuta Takahashi, 1955
- Tetraleurodes kunnathoorensis Regu & David, 1993
- Tetraleurodes leguminicola Bink-Moenen, 1983
- Tetraleurodes madagascariensis Takahashi, 1951
- Tetraleurodes malayensis Mound & Halsey, 1978
- Tetraleurodes mameti Takahashi, 1938
- Tetraleurodes marshalli Bondar, 1928
- Tetraleurodes melanops Cockerell, 1903
- Tetraleurodes mexicana Nakahara, 1995
- Tetraleurodes mirabilis Takahashi, 1961
- Tetraleurodes monnioti Cohic, 1968
- Tetraleurodes mori Quaintance, 1899
- Tetraleurodes moundi Cohic, 1968
- Tetraleurodes neemani Bink-Moenen in Bink-Moenen & Gerling, 1992
- Tetraleurodes oplismeni Takahashi, 1934
- Tetraleurodes pauliani Takahashi, 1955
- Tetraleurodes perileuca Cockerell, 1902
- Tetraleurodes perseae Nakahara, 1995
- Tetraleurodes pluto Dumbleton, 1956
- Tetraleurodes pringlei Quaintance & Baker, 1937
- Tetraleurodes pseudacaciae Nakahara, 1995
- Tetraleurodes psidii David, 1993
- Tetraleurodes pusana Takahashi, 1950
- Tetraleurodes quadratus Sampson & Drews, 1941
- Tetraleurodes quercicola Nakahara, 1995
- Tetraleurodes rugosus Corbett, 1926
- Tetraleurodes russellae Cohic, 1968
- Tetraleurodes selachidentata Bink-Moenen, 1983
- Tetraleurodes semibarbata Takahashi, 1955
- Tetraleurodes simplicior Bink-Moenen, 1983
- Tetraleurodes splendens Bemis, 1904
- Tetraleurodes stellata Maskell, 1896
- Tetraleurodes stirlingiae Martin, 1999
- Tetraleurodes submarginata Dumbleton, 1961
- Tetraleurodes subrotunda Takahashi, 1937
- Tetraleurodes sulcistriatus Martin, 1999
- Tetraleurodes supraxialis Martin, 1999
- Tetraleurodes thenmozhiae Jesudasan & David, 1991
- Tetraleurodes truncatus Sampson & Drews, 1941
- Tetraleurodes tuberculata Bink-Moenen, 1983
- Tetraleurodes tuberculosa Nakahara, 1995
- Tetraleurodes ursorum Cockerell, 1910

- Tetralicia Harrison, 1917

- Tetralicia debarroi Martin & Carver in Martin, 1999
- Tetralicia erianthi Danzig, 1969
- Tetralicia ericae Harrison, 1917
- Tetralicia graminicola Bink-Moenen, 1983
- Tetralicia iberiaca Bink-Moenen, 1989
- Tetralicia tuberculata Bink-Moenen, 1983

- Trialeurodes Cockerell, 1902

- Trialeurodes abdita Martin, 2005
- Trialeurodes abutiloneus Haldeman, 1850
- Trialeurodes amealcensis Carapia-Ruiz in Carapia-Ruiz, Gonzalez-Hernandez, Romero-Napoles, Ortega-Arenas & Koch, 2003
- Trialeurodes asplenii Maskell, 1890
- Trialeurodes bambusae Takahashi, 1943
- Trialeurodes bellissima Sampson & Drews, 1940
- Trialeurodes bemisae Russell, 1948
- Trialeurodes bruneiensis Martin in Martin & Camus, 2001
- Trialeurodes celti Takahashi, 1943
- Trialeurodes chinensis Takahashi, 1955
- Trialeurodes coccolobae Russell, 1948
- Trialeurodes colcordae Russell, 1948
- Trialeurodes corollis Penny, 1922
- Trialeurodes cryptus Martin, 2005
- Trialeurodes darwiniensis Martin, 1999
- Trialeurodes dicksoniae Martin, 1999
- Trialeurodes diminutis Penny, 1922
- Trialeurodes drewsi Sampson, 1945
- Trialeurodes elaphoglossi Takahashi, 1960
- Trialeurodes ericae Bink-Moenen, 1976
- Trialeurodes eriodictyonis Russell, 1948
- Trialeurodes euphorbiae Russell, 1948
- Trialeurodes fernaldi Morrill, 1903
- Trialeurodes floridensis Quaintance, 1900
- Trialeurodes glacialis Bemis, 1904
- Trialeurodes heucherae Russell, 1948
- Trialeurodes hutchingsi Bemis, 1904
- Trialeurodes intermedia Russell, 1948
- Trialeurodes ipomoeae Carapia-Ruiz in Carapia-Ruiz, Gonzalez-Hernandez, Romero-Napoles, Ortega-Arenas & Koch, 2003
- Trialeurodes lauri Signoret, 1882
- Trialeurodes longispina Takahashi, 1943
- Trialeurodes madroni Bemis, 1904
- Trialeurodes magnoliae Russell, 1948
- Trialeurodes mameti Takahashi, 1951
- Trialeurodes manihoti Bondar, 1923
- Trialeurodes meggitti Singh, 1933
- Trialeurodes merlini Bemis, 1904
- Trialeurodes mirissimus Sampson & Drews, 1941
- Trialeurodes multipori Russell, 1948
- Trialeurodes notata Russell, 1948
- Trialeurodes oblongifoliae Russell, 1948
- Trialeurodes packardi Morrill, 1903
- Trialeurodes palaquifolia Corbett, 1935
- Trialeurodes paucipapilla Martin, 2005
- Trialeurodes perakensis Corbett, 1935
- Trialeurodes pergandei Quaintance, 1900
- Trialeurodes phlogis Russell, 1993
- Trialeurodes rex Martin in Martin & Camus, 2001
- Trialeurodes ricini Misra, 1924
- Trialeurodes ruborum Cockerell, 1897
- Trialeurodes sardiniae Rapisarda, 1986
- Trialeurodes shawundus Baker & Moles, 1921
- Trialeurodes similis Russell, 1948
- Trialeurodes tabaci Bondar, 1928
- Trialeurodes tentaculatus Bemis, 1904
- Trialeurodes tephrosiae Russell, 1948
- Trialeurodes thaiensis Takahashi, 1943
- Trialeurodes unadutus Baker & Moles, 1921
- Trialeurodes vaporariorum Westwood, 1856
- Trialeurodes varia Quaintance & Baker, 1937
- Trialeurodes variabilis Quaintance, 1900
- Trialeurodes vitrinellus Cockerell, 1903
- Trialeurodes vittatus Quaintance, 1900

- Trialeurolonga Martin, 2005

- Trialeurolonga trifida Martin, 2005

- Trichoaleyrodes Takahashi & Mamet, 1952

- Trichoaleyrodes carinata Takahashi & Mamet, 1952

- Tuberaleyrodes Takahashi, 1932

- Tuberaleyrodes bobuae Takahashi, 1934
- Tuberaleyrodes machili Takahashi, 1932
- Tuberaleyrodes neolitseae Young, 1944
- Tuberaleyrodes rambutana Takahashi, 1955
- Tuberaleyrodes spiniferosa Corbett, 1933

- Vasantharajiella P. M. M. David, 2000

- Vasantharajiella kalakadensis P. M. M. David, 2000

- Vasdavidius Russell, 2000

- Vasdavidius cobarensis Martin, 1999
- Vasdavidius concursus Ko in Ko, Wu & Chou, 1998
- Vasdavidius indicus David & Subramaniam, 1976
- Vasdavidius miscanthus Ko in Ko, Wu & Chou, 1998
- Vasdavidius setiferus Quaintance & Baker, 1917

- Venezaleurodes Russell, 1967

- Venezaleurodes pisoniae Russell, 1967

- Viennotaleyrodes Cohic, 1968

- Viennotaleyrodes bergerardi Cohic, 1966
- Viennotaleyrodes bicolorata Martin, 1999
- Viennotaleyrodes bosciae Bink-Moenen, 1983
- Viennotaleyrodes curvisetosus Martin, 1999
- Viennotaleyrodes dichrostachi Bink-Moenen, 1983
- Viennotaleyrodes fallax Bink-Moenen, 1983
- Viennotaleyrodes incomptus Martin, 1999
- Viennotaleyrodes lacunae Martin, 1999
- Viennotaleyrodes megapapillae Singh, 1932
- Viennotaleyrodes nilagiriensis David, Krishnan & Thenmozhi, 1994
- Viennotaleyrodes platysepali Cohic, 1966

- Xenaleyrodes Takahashi, 1936

- Xenaleyrodes artocarpi Takahashi, 1936
- Xenaleyrodes broughae Martin, 1985
- Xenaleyrodes eucalypti Dumbleton, 1956
- Xenaleyrodes fauceregius Martin, 1999
- Xenaleyrodes irianicus Martin, 1985
- Xenaleyrodes timonii Martin, 1985

- Xenobemisia Takahashi, 1951

- Xenobemisia coleae Takahashi, 1951

- Yleyrodes Bink-Moenen, 1983

- Yleyrodes isoberlinae Bink-Moenen, 1983

- Zaphanera Corbett, 1926

- Zaphanera capparis Bink-Moenen, 1983
- Zaphanera cyanotis Corbett, 1926
- Zaphanera indicus Jesudasan & David, 1991
- Zaphanera publicus Singh, 1938

== Aleurodicinae Quaintance & Baker, 1913 ==
- Aleurodicus Douglas, 1892

- Aleurodicus antidesmae Corbett, 1926
- Aleurodicus antillensis Dozier, 1936
- Aleurodicus araujoi Sampson & Drews, 1941
- Aleurodicus capiangae Bondar, 1923
- Aleurodicus cinnamomi Takahashi, 1951
- Aleurodicus coccolobae Quaintance & Baker, 1913
- Aleurodicus cocois Curtis, 1846
- Aleurodicus destructor Mackie, 1912
- Aleurodicus dispersus Russell, 1965
- Aleurodicus dugesii Cockerell, 1896
- Aleurodicus essigi Sampson & Drews, 1941
- Aleurodicus flavus Hempel, 1922
- Aleurodicus fucatus Bondar, 1923
- Aleurodicus guppyi Quaintance & Baker, 1913
- Aleurodicus holmesii Maskell, 1896
- Aleurodicus indicus Regu & David, 1992
- Aleurodicus inversus Martin, 2004
- Aleurodicus jamaicensis Cockerell, 1902
- Aleurodicus juleikae Bondar, 1923
- Aleurodicus machili Takahashi, 1931
- Aleurodicus magnificus Costa Lima, 1928
- Aleurodicus maritimus Hempel, 1922
- Aleurodicus marmoratus Hempel, 1922
- Aleurodicus neglectus Quaintance & Baker, 1913
- Aleurodicus niveus Martin, 2004
- Aleurodicus ornatus Cockerell, 1893
- Aleurodicus pauciporus Martin, 2004
- Aleurodicus pulvinatus Maskell, 1896
- Aleurodicus rugioperculatus Martin, 2004
- Aleurodicus talamancensis Martin, 2005
- Aleurodicus trinidadensis Quaintance & Baker, 1913
- Aleurodicus vinculus Martin, 2004
- Aleurodicus wallaceus Martin, 1988

- Aleuronudus Hempel, 1922

- Aleuronudus acapulcensis Sampson & Drews, 1941
- Aleuronudus bondari Costa Lima, 1928
- Aleuronudus induratus Hempel, 1922
- Aleuronudus jaciae Bondar, 1923
- Aleuronudus jequiensis Bondar, 1928
- Aleuronudus manni Baker, 1923
- Aleuronudus melzeri Bondar, 1928

- Austroaleurodicus Tapia, 1970

- Austroaleurodicus lomatiae Tapia, 1970
- Austroaleurodicus pigeanus Baker & Moles, 1921

- Azuraleurodicus Martin, 1999

- Azuraleurodicus pentarthrus Martin in Martin & Polaszek, 1999

- Bakerius Bondar, 1923

- Bakerius amazonicus Penny & Arias, 1980
- Bakerius attenuatus Bondar, 1923
- Bakerius calmoni Bondar, 1928
- Bakerius conspurcatus Enderlein, 1909
- Bakerius glandulosus Hempel, 1938
- Bakerius maculatus Penny & Arias, 1980
- Bakerius phrygilanthi Bondar, 1923
- Bakerius sanguineus Bondar, 1928
- Bakerius sublatus Bondar, 1928

- Costalimada Martin, 2011

- Costalimada brasiliensis Martin, 2011

- Ceraleurodicus Hempel, 1922

- Ceraleurodicus assymmetrus Bondar, 1922
- Ceraleurodicus duckei Penny & Arias, 1980
- Ceraleurodicus hempeli Costa Lima, 1928
- Ceraleurodicus keris Martin, 2004
- Ceraleurodicus neivai Bondar, 1928
- Ceraleurodicus splendidus Hempel, 1922
- Ceraleurodicus varus Bondar, 1928

- Dialeurodicus Cockerell, 1902

- Dialeurodicus bondariae Martin, 2004
- Dialeurodicus caballeroi Martin, 2004
- Dialeurodicus cockerellii Quaintance, 1900
- Dialeurodicus coelhi Bondar, 1928
- Dialeurodicus cornutus Bondar, 1923
- Dialeurodicus frontalis Bondar, 1923
- Dialeurodicus maculatus Bondar, 1928
- Dialeurodicus niger Bondar, 1923
- Dialeurodicus radifera Sampson & Drews, 1941
- Dialeurodicus silvestrii Leonardi, 1910
- Dialeurodicus similis Bondar, 1923
- Dialeurodicus tessellatus Quaintance & Baker, 1913

- Eudialeurodicus Quaintance & Baker, 1915

- Eudialeurodicus bodkini Quaintance & Baker, 1915

- Lecanoideus Quaintance & Baker, 1913

- Lecanoideus floccissimus Martin, Hérnandez-Suarez & Carnero, 1997
- Lecanoideus mirabilis Cockerell, 1898

- Leonardius Quaintance & Baker, 1913

- Leonardius kellyae Martin, 2004
- Leonardius lahillei Leonardi, 1910

- Metaleurodicus Quaintance & Baker, 1913

- Metaleurodicus arcanus Martin, 2004
- Metaleurodicus bahiensis Hempel, 1922
- Metaleurodicus cardini Back, 1912
- Metaleurodicus griseus Dozier, 1936
- Metaleurodicus lacerdae Signoret, 1883
- Metaleurodicus minimus Quaintance, 1900
- Metaleurodicus phalaenoides Blanchard, 1852
- Metaleurodicus stelliferus Bondar, 1923
- Metaleurodicus tenuis Martin, 2004
- Metaleurodicus variporus Martin, 2004

- Nealeurodicus Hempel, 1922

- Nealeurodicus altissimus Quaintance, 1900
- Nealeurodicus bakeri Bondar, 1923
- Nealeurodicus fallax Martin, 2004
- Nealeurodicus ingae J. M. Baker, 1937
- Nealeurodicus moreirai Costa Lima, 1928
- Nealeurodicus octifer Bondar, 1923
- Nealeurodicus paulistus Hempel, 1922
- Nealeurodicus petiolaris Martin, 2004

- Nipaleyrodes Takahashi, 1951

- Nipaleyrodes elongata Takahashi, 1951

- Octaleurodicus Hempel, 1922

- Octaleurodicus nitidus Hempel, 1922
- Octaleurodicus pulcherrimus Quaintance & Baker, 1913

- Paraleyrodes Quaintance, 1909

- Paraleyrodes ancora Martin, 2004
- Paraleyrodes bondari Peracchi, 1971
- Paraleyrodes cervus Martin, 2004
- Paraleyrodes citri Bondar, 1931
- Paraleyrodes citricolus Costa Lima, 1928
- Paraleyrodes crateraformans Bondar, 1922
- Paraleyrodes goyabae Goeldi, 1886
- Paraleyrodes minei Iaccarino, 1990
- Paraleyrodes naranjae Dozier, 1927
- Paraleyrodes perplexus Martin, 2004
- Paraleyrodes perseae Quaintance, 1900
- Paraleyrodes proximus Terán, 1979
- Paraleyrodes pseudonaranjae Martin, 2001
- Paraleyrodes pulverans Bondar, 1923
- Paraleyrodes singularis Bondar, 1923
- Paraleyrodes triungulae Martin, 2004
- Paraleyrodes urichii Quaintance & Baker, 1913

- Pseudosynaleurodicus Gillespie, 2006

- Pseudosynaleurodicus mayoi Gillespie, 2006
- Pseudosynaleurodicus nigrimarginatus Gillespie, 2006

- Stenaleyrodes Takahashi, 1938

- Stenaleyrodes papillote Martin & Streito, 2003
- Stenaleyrodes vinsoni Takahashi, 1938

- Synaleurodicus Solomon, 1935

- Synaleurodicus hakeae Solomon, 1935
- Synaleurodicus serratus Martin, 1999

== Udamoselinae Enderlein, 1909 ==
- Udamoselis Enderlein, 1909

- Udamoselis estrellamarinae Martin, 2007
- Udamoselis pigmentaria Enderlein, 1909
