= Aleyrodes millettiae =

Scientific classification
- Domain: Eukaryota
- Kingdom: Animalia
- Phylum: Arthropoda
- Class: Insecta
- Order: Hemiptera
- Suborder: Sternorrhyncha
- Superfamily: Aleyrodoidea
- Family: Aleyrodidae
- Genus: Aleyrodes
- Species: A. millettiae

Binomial name
- Aleyrodes millettiae Cohic, 1968

Species of true bug

Aleyrodes millettiae is a whitefly species named by François Cohic in 1968.
