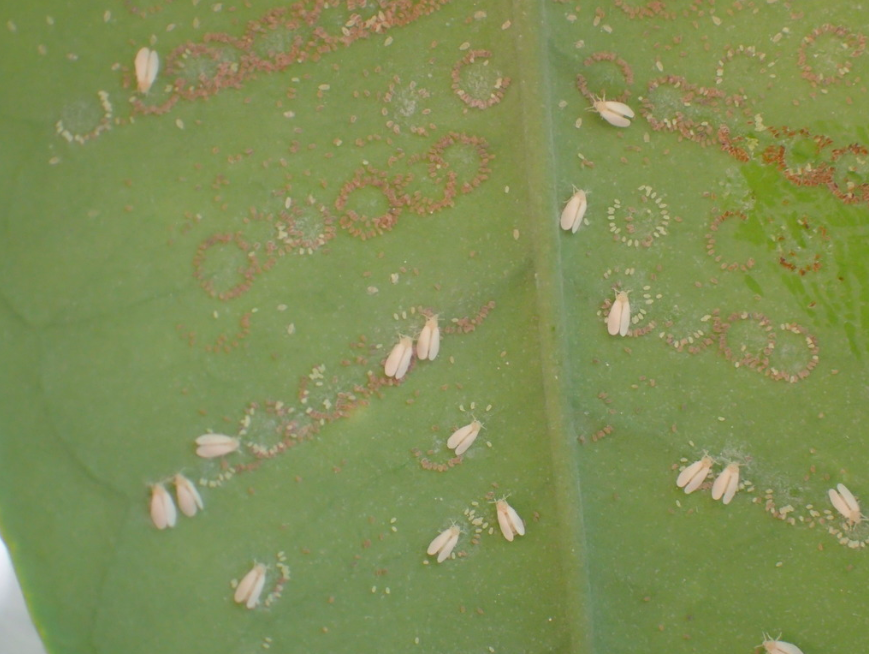

Scientific classification
- Domain: Eukaryota
- Kingdom: Animalia
- Phylum: Arthropoda
- Class: Insecta
- Order: Hemiptera
- Suborder: Sternorrhyncha
- Family: Aleyrodidae
- Genus: Orchamoplatus
- Species: O. citri

Binomial name
- Orchamoplatus citri Takahashi, 1940

= Orchamoplatus citri =

Species of whitefly

Orchamoplatus citri, commonly known as the Australian citrus whitefly, is a whitefly species in the genus Orchamoplatus. It is found across Australia and New Zealand, primarily foraging on the leaves of citrus trees.

== Description ==
The adult Orchamoplatus citri is a small insect reaching 1–2.5 millimetres (0.04–0.10 in) in length, with two pairs of white-scaled wings that cover its pale body. Adult whiteflies are found on the underside of young citrus leaves in clusters and fly off in masses when disturbed. Adult males can be mistaken for small white moths, whilst the nymphs are flat oval shapes on the leaves. A distinguishing feature of the Aleyrodidae family is the production and secretion of wax on the body. This is thought to help protect against water loss in the growth stages, act as camouflage for the nymphal stages and protect against their waste product (honeydew) in the adult stages. Orchamoplatus citri is easily distinguished from other insects by the circular pattern of eggs they lay and the presence of honeydew with black sooty mould growth.

== Range ==
=== Natural global range ===
Orchamoplatus citri is an Australian species of whitefly. It has been located primarily in warm, coastal areas in the southeastern parts of Australia. Populations have been found in Tasmania, South Australia, Victoria, New South Wales, Queensland, and a small population was found in Western Australia in Perth. It has yet to spread to the Northern territories but has, however, moved into the northern parts of New Zealand.

=== New Zealand range ===
The Australian whitefly was first discovered in Auckland in 2000 and since then, Orchamoplatus citri has spread throughout the North Island and reached the northern parts of the South Island. This whitefly dominates areas such as Kerikeri, Gisborne and the Bay of Plenty, causing citrus farmers issues with sooty mould growth and health issues to the trees.

== Habitat ==
Orchamoplatus citri is primarily found on citrus trees in the family Rutaceae. All varieties of citrus such as oranges, lemons and mandarins have been found with Orchamoplatus citri infestations. This whitefly has occasionally been found on native juvenile leaves of pohutukawa (Metrosideros excelsa) and titoki (Alectryon excelsus), but appears to thrive on the underside of citrus tree leaves. Its known locations in Australia and the northern parts of New Zealand suggest this whitefly prefers warmer climates, which align with the climates preferred by the Rutaceae family.

== Ecology ==
=== Life cycle/Phenology ===
The life cycle of Orchamoplatus citri can be broken down into six stages. Like with all other whiteflies, the first stage involves laying eggs in the winter months. Yellow, oval-shaped eggs are laid by the adult Orchamoplatus citri in a circular shape on the underside of mature leaves with a powdery wax covering them. These eggs have a pointed pedicle at the base which is inserted into the leaf tissue. This pedicle allows water to flow into the egg to prevent it from drying out. When laid, the eggs are a pale cream/yellow colour and as they mature, their colour changes to a darker brown. After a few days, these eggs will hatch and the crawlers (first-stage nymph) will emerge from the egg around 0.03–0.6 millimetres (0.001–0.024 in) in length with six legs and a pale yellow appearance. Although mobile, the crawlers will only travel a few millimetres from their egg. Here they will feed by inserting their sucking mouth-parts into the leaf tissue and phloem of the plant and don’t move until they grow into a pupa. The third and fourth stages of the life cycle are similar, involving the growth and development of the nymph. After a few … of feeding and growth, the outside of the nymph begins to harden and form oval pupal cases. The adults are the final stage of the whitefly life cycle and will emerge from the cases in spring and throughout summer. Individuals that hatch and survive the immature stages through winter develop slower than the young that hatch and develop in the warming spring months. As an adult, they survive 3–4 weeks. The lifecycle of Orchamoplatus citri has been found to occur at slower rates in comparison to more common garden whitefly species. Because of this longer generation time, the population growth of Orchamoplatus citri is slower and therefore easier for citrus farmers to control.

Whiteflies often reproduce sexually; the females that mate will produce both male and female offspring, but females that don’t mate will produce only male offspring. Orchamoplatus citri often produces only one or two generations each year depending on the climate, in comparison to other whitefly species that can produce multiple generations a year. In Queensland, however, where the climate is warmer all year around, up to six generations of Orchamoplatus citri can occur in one year.

=== Diet and foraging ===
Orchamoplatus citri is one of the very few whitefly species that has shown evidence of host plant specificity. The species is found to live and feed only on the leaves of the Rutaceae family, commonly known as the citrus family. Its origin in Australia suggests there may be native host plants such as Eremocitrus glauca, commonly known as the Australian Desert Lime. This native woody citrus tree is thought to have been an original host for Orchamoplatus citri, but with the introduction of other citrus plants, it has spread to other species in the citrus genus.

Orchamoplatus citri eats by inserting its piercing mouthparts into the leaf tissue and the phloem of citrus plants. Here, it can obtain all nutrients such as the sugars and sap the plant uses to grow. In large populations, these whiteflies can stunt the growth of the citrus tree and exhaust it from a lack of nutrients. As these whiteflies feed on the sugary sap of the plant, they excrete honeydew onto the leaves. Black sooty mould grows on this sugary honeydew, coating the leaves and fruit black. The growth of this mould limits the amount of light that reaches the leaves. This reduction in light penetration decreases the rate of photosynthesis which can ultimately kill the host plant. Orchamoplatus citri causes both physical and economic damage to the citrus industry in New South Wales due to its impact on the health and production of the trees.

=== Predators, parasites, and diseases ===
There is limited information on the predators of Orchamoplatus citri but it is thought that those that feed on the larvae and eggs of Orchamoplatus citri are doing so as the opportunity arises and not intentionally seeking them out. There have been signs of Hymenoptera parasitising whiteflies in Australia with their larvae such as Encarsia formosa (a species of wasp), which was introduced to Australia as a biological control agent to manage general whitefly numbers. This biological agent hasn’t been specifically used on Orchamoplatus citri but there is still a possibility that parasitoids are a predator of this species.

Parasitoids of whiteflies often belong to either the Aphelinidae, Platygastridae or Eulophidae families, and although individuals from these families have been captured on citrus plants, they haven’t appeared to parasitise Orchamoplatus citri. Researchers have found that Encarsia iris has been a common parasitoid of Orchamoplatus citri in Queensland. Monitoring of Orchamoplatus citri in New Zealand has shown no signs of individuals or eggs being parasitised by parasitoids. However, New Zealand does have a few species that feed on Orchamoplatus citri. The citrus whitefly ladybird (Serangium maculigerum), the Tasmanian lacewing (Micromus tasmaniae), the steel blue ladybird (Halmus chalybeus), the Australian variable lacewing (Drepanacra binocular) and the citrus whitefly predator beetle (Cybocephalus) have all been recorded feeding on Orchamoplatus citri. Verticillium lecanii, a species of fungus, has also been seen to infect juvenile Orchamoplatus citri in areas of prolonged rainfall and wet weather conditions.

== Pest status ==
Although it can damage citrus plants, Orchamoplatus citri is so far not a significant citrus pest species in New Zealand. Oil sprays and soap solutions have proven to be effective and can be used on the citrus to protect the plant, repelling any whiteflies that feed on it. Studies on the effective predators of this species in New Zealand are limited. If their numbers continue to grow, and being to create large economic impacts, then biological programmes should be researched and investigated to control this pest species.
