= Aleurotrachelus atratus =

Scientific classification
- Kingdom: Animalia
- Phylum: Arthropoda
- Clade: Pancrustacea
- Class: Insecta
- Order: Hemiptera
- Suborder: Sternorrhyncha
- Family: Aleyrodidae
- Genus: Aleurotrachelus
- Species: A. atratus

Binomial name
- Aleurotrachelus atratus Hempel, 1922

Species of true bug

Aleurotrachelus atratus better known as the palm-infesting whitefly is an invasive species that affects coconut palms. Originally, this species was only prevalent in Brazil and was known to feed on coconuts native to this country. Now, the species has migrated to the tropics and subtropics and is invasive in many other countries. Aleurotrachelus is one of the largest genus, containing 74 species.

== Description ==
Aleurotrachelus atratus are small insects whose puparia have wax filaments that cover the bug in its entirety. A. Atratus are generally dark yellow with all four larval stages being black. Adult whiteflies are very small bugs with white wings. Females lay eggs on the underside directly onto plant leaves, and eventually, eggs become crawlers after 6 days. These nymphs remain on the same leaf for the rest of their development until they emerge as winged adults. This cycle takes about 3 weeks in favorable conditions, however, the whiteflies are able to survive in freezing temperatures. Identification of the species is best through mounted slides as most species of the whiteflies have very similar characteristics. The slides confirmed an elongated oval puparium with an entire dark cuticle, marginal teeth separated, rounded apices/ converging suntruncare,

=== Range and habitat ===
Originally Aleurotrachelus atratus was first reported in South America but new reports have been made in North America, Central America, the Caribbean, Africa and in the lower parts of Asia. They are able to travel short distances by flying most reports are due to infected plants being brought into areas where there are no natural predators for the whitefly. Aleurotrachelus atratus prefer tropical habitats where coconut palms are cultivated. Whiteflies also migrate towards agricultural land, managed forests, plantations and orchards.

=== Life cycle ===
The life cycle for Aleurotrachelus atratus lays anywhere between 50 and 400 eggs in its lifetime. From egg to crawler then through second, third, and fourth instar nymph, and finally, an adult Aleurotrachelus atratus the full life cycle takes around 48 days or 2 months. Most of the days are spread out between the three instar while from egg to crawler takes about 4-12 days for the larvae to hatch.

=== Agricultural threat ===
India is the largest coconut producing country in the world with contributions of global production totaling 31%. Coconut palms are a major food source and provide livelihood opportunities to more than 12 million people in the country. There are 464 species of whiteflies in India but A. atratus poses a higher threat compared to other species.

=== Host plants ===
Primarily host plants for A. atratus are Cocos nucifera (coconut palm) other host plants that may be infected by Aleurotrachelus atratus includes Washingtonia spp. (fan palms), Phoenix dactylifera (date palm), Veitchia merrillii (Christmas palm), and Elaeis guineensis (African oil palm). Most of the plants from the Arecaceae family are infected by Aleurotrachelus atratus.

=== Damage by feeding ===
Coconut palm flies feed on the underside of palm leaves. The removal of sap reduces plant vigour, causing chlorosis. This leads to premature leaf drop which ultimately reduces yields. In addition to weather damage, large infestations of whiteflies cause death of the palms.

=== Invasive impacts ===
Some invasive impacts that Aleurotrachelus atratus cause are economic strains that lead to social impacts. Some economic strains would cause targeted crops to produce lower yields and negatively change normal cultural practices. Social impacts would be parallel with economic impacts as the livelihood of the farmers would decrease and limit social opportunities. Environmental impacts cause changes in cultural practices and may cause official or private programs to take action in controlling the pest.

=== Control management ===
Management of this invasive species involves the removal of infested leaves (during early stages of development). Different methods of management hosing down the plant(s) with a fine but strong blast of water. Another method involves reflective mulch, such as aluminum foil can help repel whiteflies. Another alternative method consists of yellow sticky traps, because they can help monitor whitefly numbers as well as catch a majority of them. Vacuuming the whiteflies off the plants with a dust buster during mornings or cool evenings is another useful methodology because the insects are sluggish during these time periods. Using insecticidal soaps and Neem may reduce but will not completely eradicate a whitefly problem. Planting Nasturtiums or Calendula to deter insect pests is likely that those plants will become a magnet for the pest and one will need to pull the plants at some stage.

=== Biological control management ===
Biological control can have after effects that may cause more invasive damage due to introducing another invasive species or parasite. Introducing insects that feed on whiteflies such as Lacewings, Ladybugs, Big-eyed bugs and Minute pirate bugs are possible solutions for controlling Aleurotrachelus atratus for agriculture purposes. An alternative control management is using parasites that feed on whiteflies such as the species Encarsia formosa wasps, or Eretmocerus cocois Sp. These control management work well when the introduced insect or parasite is already in the area where Aleurotrachelus atratus is. Both methods target A. atratus during its larvae phase.
