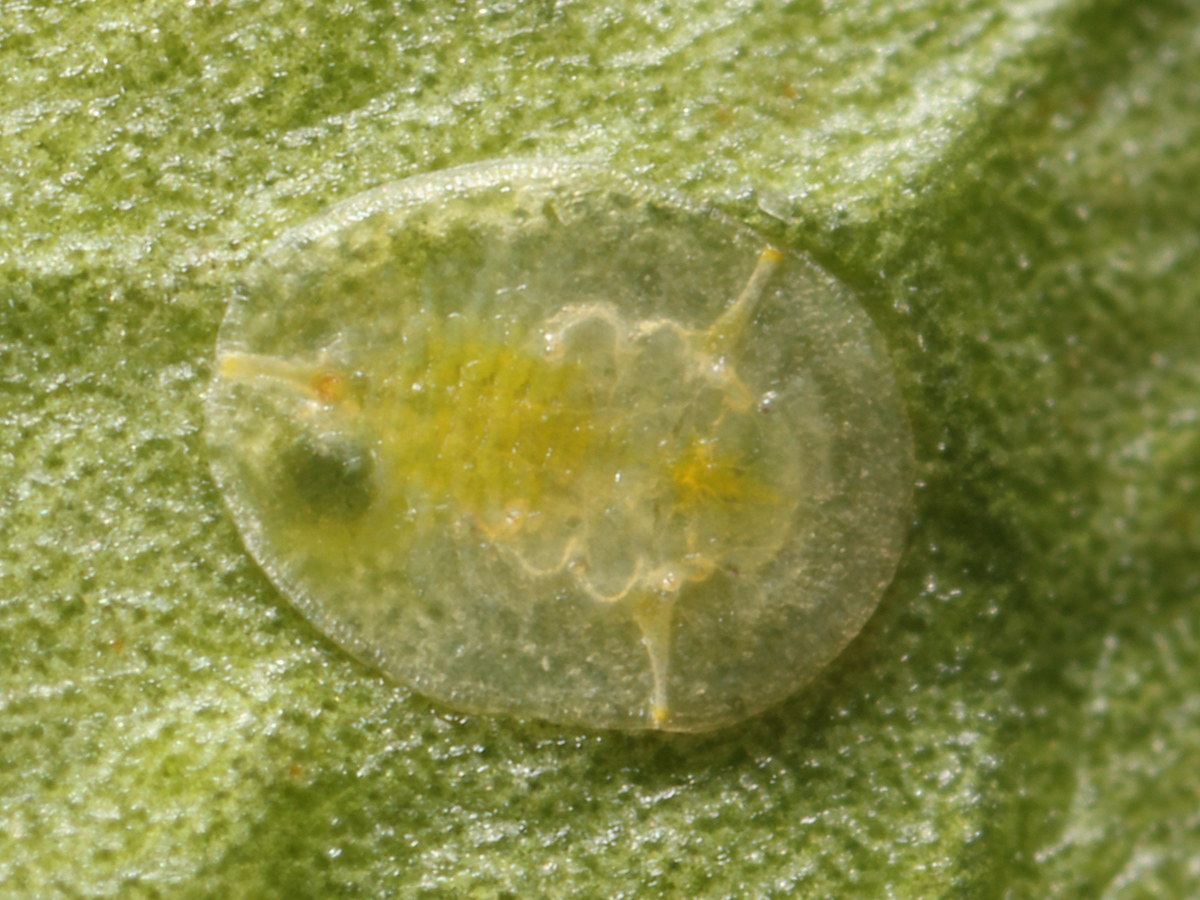

Scientific classification
- Domain: Eukaryota
- Kingdom: Animalia
- Phylum: Arthropoda
- Class: Insecta
- Order: Hemiptera
- Suborder: Sternorrhyncha
- Family: Aleyrodidae
- Genus: Dialeurodes; Cockerell, 1902

= Dialeurodes =

Genus of true bugs

Dialeurodes is a genus of whiteflies in the family Aleyrodidae. There are at least three described species in Dialeurodes.

== Species ==
- Dialeurodes citri (citrus whitefly)
- Dialeurodes citrifolii (Morgan, 1893)
- Dialeurodes kirkaldyi (Kotinsky, 1907)
