= Pseudaleuroplatus =

Scientific classification
- Kingdom: Animalia
- Phylum: Arthropoda
- Class: Insecta
- Order: Hemiptera
- Suborder: Sternorrhyncha
- Family: Aleyrodidae
- Genus: Pseudaleuroplatus; Martin, 1999

Genus of insects

Pseudaleuroplatus is an Australian genus of whiteflies in the family Aleyrodidae.

== Description ==
Puparia of Pseudaleuroplatus have a black cuticle (usually requiring bleaching before they can be examined). The margin is regularly toothed and (unlike some other whiteflies) is not modified at the caudal and thoracic tracheal openings. Each of the marginal teeth has a distinct, tubercular, dorsobasal gland. The submargin has only faint striae running a short distance mesad from between the marginal teeth. Additionally, the submargin is not differentiated from the dorsal disc by a regular furrow or fold.

The dorsal disc has pores which may be indistinct or placed on papillae. The head usually lacks cephalic setae. The first abdominal setae are set close to the median line and are normal. Eighth abdominal setae are present and caudal setae are also usually present. The transverse moulting sutures do not reach the margin. The seventh abdominal segment is not significantly reduced in the middle. The vasiform orifice is cordate with its internal posterolateral margin being multiple-notched. It is fully occupied by the operculum and the lingula is obscured. A caudal furrow is absent.

On the ventral surface of the pupa, the thoracic tracheal folds are slightly marked. The cuticle is not stippled.

Superficially, this genus resembles Aleuroplatus, thus its name (pseudo- meaning "false"). It differs from Aleuroplatus in the marginal teeth being unmodified at tracheal openings and first abdominal setae being present.

== Ecology ==
Pseudaleuroplatus kiensis is associated with Melaleuca sp. (Myrtaceae), while P. litseae is associated with Neolitsea dealbata (Lauraceae). Some undescribed species have been collected from Mangifera, Pouteria, Leptospermum and Syzygium paniculatum (Myrtaceae).

== Species ==
Below are the two described species of Pseudaleuroplatus. Two undescribed species are also known.

- Pseudaleuroplatus kiensis Martin, 1999
- Pseudaleuroplatus litseae Dumbleton, 1956
