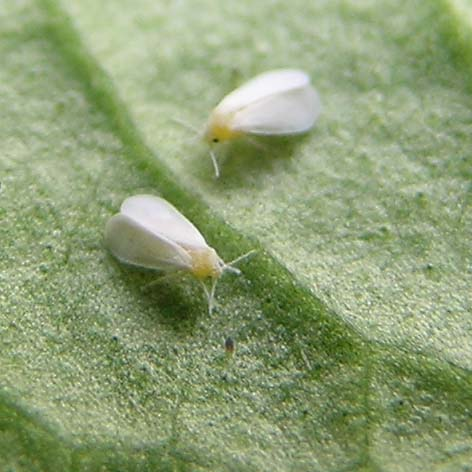
- Whiteflies (Trialeurodes vaporariorum)

Scientific classification
- Kingdom: Animalia
- Phylum: Arthropoda
- Clade: Pancrustacea
- Class: Insecta
- Order: Hemiptera
- Suborder: Sternorrhyncha
- Superfamily: Aleyrodoidea
- Family: Aleyrodidae; Westwood, 1840

Subfamilies
- Aleurodicinae; Aleyrodinae; Udamoselinae †Bernaeinae

Synonyms
- Aleurodidae

= Whitefly =

Whitefly Temporal range: Middle Jurassic–Recent

Family of insects

Whiteflies are hemipterans that typically feed on the undersides of plant leaves. They are classified in the family Aleyrodidae, the only family in the superfamily Aleyrodoidea. More than 1550 whitefly species have been described.

== Description and taxonomy ==
The Aleyrodidae are a family in the suborder Sternorrhyncha and at present comprise the entire superfamily Aleyrodoidea, related to the superfamily Psylloidea. The family often occurs in older literature as "Aleurodidae", but that is a junior synonym and accordingly incorrect in terms of the international standards for zoological nomenclature.

Aleyrodidae are small insects, most species with a wingspan of less than 3 mm and a body length of 1 mm to 2 mm. Many are so small that their size complicates their control in greenhouses because they can only be excluded by screening with very fine mesh; in fact they can enter mesh so fine that many of their natural enemies cannot come in after them, so that unchecked whitefly populations in greenhouses rapidly become overwhelming. Some "giant whitefly" species exist, some of which may exceed 5 mm in size. This sometimes is associated with sexual dimorphism in which one sex is markedly larger than the other. Such dimorphism is common in the Sternorrhyncha, in which the males of most scale insects for example are tiny compared to the female. Remarkably however, in some giant tropical species the males are much larger than the females.

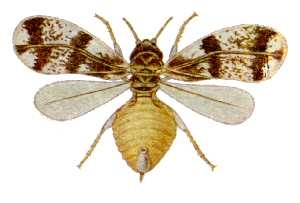
Neomaskellia bergii, illustrating the wing venation and showing the vasiform orifice above the tip of the abdomen

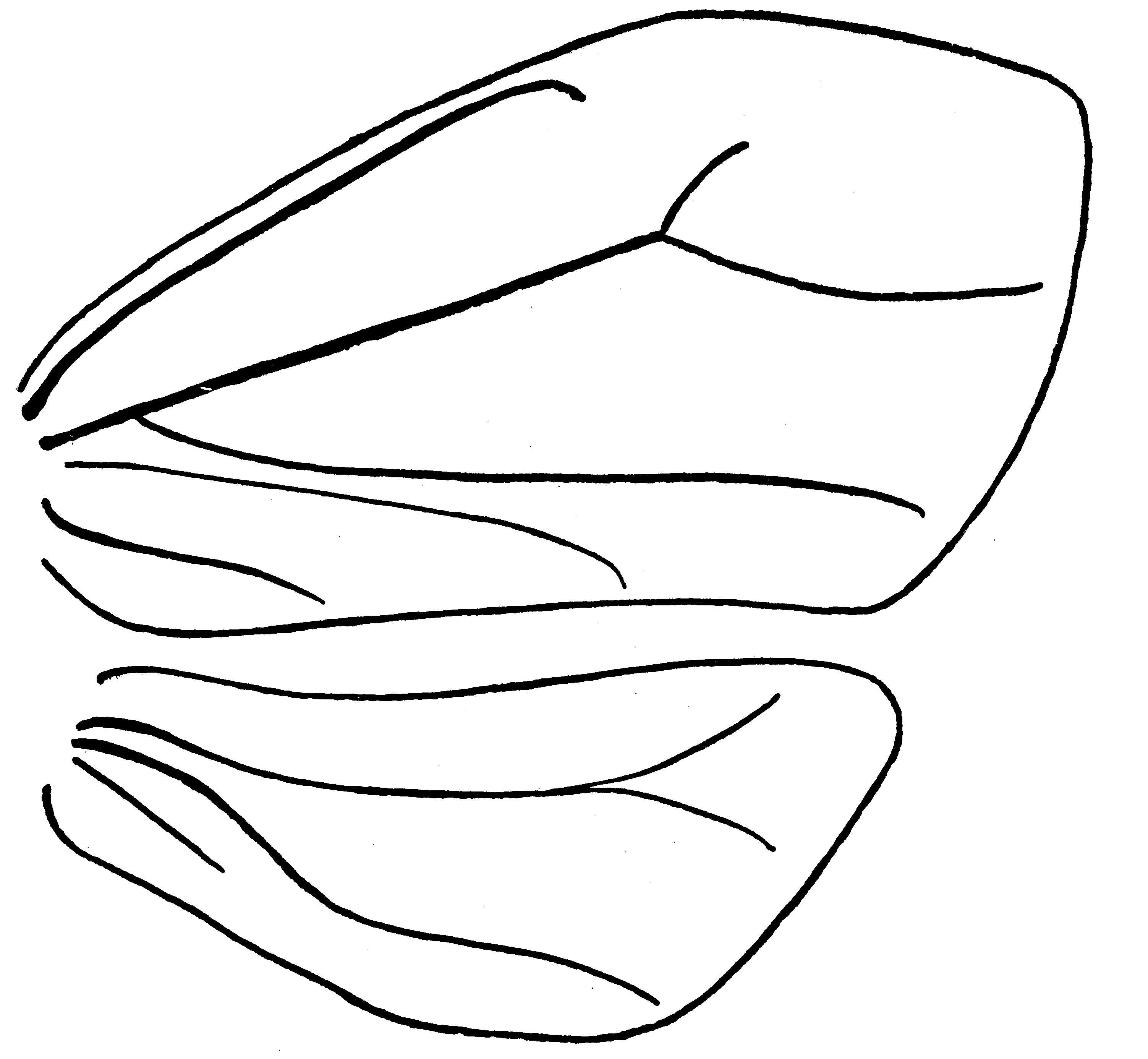
Venation in a large species of Udamoselis is more complex

Like most of the mobile Sternorrhyncha, adult Aleyrodidae have well-developed antennae, which in most species in this family are seven-segmented.

As in many Hemiptera, there are two ocelli, which generally in the Aleyrodidae are placed at the anterior margins of the compound eyes. The compound eyes themselves are rather remarkable: many have a distinct constriction between the upper and lower halves, and in some species there is a complete separation. Many insects' compound eyes are divided into functionally and anatomically distinct upper and lower regions, but the adaptation's purpose or origin in Aleyrodidae is unclear. The degree of separation is useful in recognising the species; for instance, one way to tell adult Bemisia from Trialeurodes is that the upper and lower parts of the compound eyes are connected by a single ommatidium in Bemisia, while in Trialeurodes they are completely separate.

Both sexes have functional mouthparts and two pairs of membranous, functional wings; the rear wings are neither much reduced, nor modified into any such hooked or haltere-like structures as occur in some other Hemiptera such as many of the Coccoidea. The wing venation is reduced, like that of the Psyllidae, only generally much more so. In many genera there is only one conspicuous and unbranched vein in each wing; however, wings of larger species such as Udamoselis have less reduced venation, though their veins still are simple and few.

The insects and their wings are variously marked or mottled according to species, and many species are covered with fine wax powder, giving most species a floury, dusted appearance, hence names such as Aleyrodidae, Aleurodidae and Aleuroduplidens; the root refers to the Ancient Greek: αλευρώδης (aleurodes) meaning "floury". However, not all species are white; for example, Aleurocanthus woglumi is slaty black.

The legs of Aleyrodidae are well developed and fairly long, but gracile, and in contrast to Psyllidae, not adapted to leaping. The tarsi have two segments of roughly equal length. The pretarsus has paired claws, with an empodium between—in some species the empodium is a bristle, but in others it is a pad.

The digestive system of the Aleyrodidae is typical of the Sternorrhyncha, including a filter chamber, and all active stages of the Aleyrodidae accordingly produce large quantities of honeydew; the anus is adapted to presentation of honeydew to symbiotic species, mainly ants; the honeydew emerges from the anus, which is inside an opening called the vasiform orifice on the dorsal surface of the caudal segment of the abdomen. This orifice is large and is covered by an operculum. The entire structure is characteristic of the Aleyrodidae and within the family it is taxonomically diagnostic because it varies in shape according to the species. Within the orifice beneath the operculum there is a tongue-like lingula. It appears to be involved in the expulsion of honeydew, and in fact at one time was wrongly assumed to be the organ that produced the honeydew. In some species it protrudes from beneath the operculum, but in others it normally is hidden.

== Evolutionary history ==
The oldest members of the family belong to the Mesozoic subfamily Bernaeinae, known from the Middle/Upper Jurassic-Upper Cretaceous, the oldest representatives of the extant subfamilies Aleyrodinae and Aleurodicinae appear during the Lower Cretaceous.

== Reproduction and metamorphosis ==
The eggs of Aleyrodidae generally are laid near each other on the food plant, usually on a leaf, in spiral patterns or arcs, sometimes in parallel arcs. The egg is elongated, with one narrow end produced into a pedicel, which in some species is longer than the rest of the egg. After fertilisation the pedicel shrivels into a stalk.

The details vary, but at least some species can reproduce parthenogenically by automixis. However, apparently all males are parthenogenically produced by arrhenotoky. The female however, can mate with her own male offspring, and thereafter produce eggs of both sexes.

There generally are four larval instars. All the instars are more or less in the shape of a flattened ellipse fringed with bristles and waxy filaments. The first instar has functional legs, though short. Once it has inserted its stylets into the phloem to feed, it settles down and no longer uses its legs, and they degenerate after the first ecdysis. From then until it emerges as an adult, it remains attached to the plant by its mouthparts. The final instar feeds for a while, then undergoes changes within its skin, ceasing feeding and growing a new skin, forming what amounts to pupa. In doing so the insect does not shed the larval skin, which it retains as a protective puparium and which dries out. Meanwhile, the pupa within this skin develops into a pharate adult that usually is visible through the wall of the puparium. The puparium splits open as the imago forces its way out.

This pupal stage is analogous to the pupal forms of the Holometabola and it raises questions of terminology and concept. Some authorities argue that there is little functional, and no logically cogent basis for the distinction between the terms "larva" and "nymph". Some have long been in favour of dropping the term nymph entirely, and certainly apply the term "larvae" to the Aleyrodidae.

== Agricultural threat ==
In warm or tropical climates and especially in greenhouses, whiteflies present major problems in crop protection. Worldwide economic losses are estimated at hundreds of millions of dollars annually.

Prominent pest species include:

- Aleurocanthus woglumi, citrus blackfly, which, in spite of its color, is a whitefly that attacks citrus
- Aleyrodes proletella, cabbage whitefly, is a pest of various Brassica crops.
- Bemisia tabaci, silverleaf whitefly, is a pest of many agricultural and ornamental crops.
- Trialeurodes vaporariorum, greenhouse whitefly, a major pest of greenhouse fruit, vegetables, and ornamentals

Although several species of whitefly may cause some crop losses simply by sucking sap when they are very numerous, the major harm they do is indirect. Firstly, like many other sap-sucking Hemiptera, they secrete large amounts of honeydew that support unsightly or harmful infestations of sooty mold. Recent studies suggest that insecticides can also be excreted through the honeydew leading to unintended effects. Secondly, they inject saliva that may harm the plant more than either the mechanical damage of feeding or the growth of the fungi. However, by far their major importance as crop pests is their transmission of diseases of plants.

Although there are a great many species of whiteflies, and the family is notorious for devastating transmission of crop viruses, the actual proportion of whiteflies which are responsible is very low. The most prominent disease vectors among the Aleyrodidae are a species complex in the genus Bemisia. Bemisia tabaci and B. argentifolii transmit African cassava mosaic, bean golden mosaic, bean dwarf mosaic, bean calico mosaic, tomato yellow leaf curl, tomato mottle, and other Begomoviruses, in the family Geminiviridae. The worldwide spread of emerging biotypes, such as B. tabaci biotype B, also known as 'B. argentifolii', and a new biotype Q, continue to cause severe crop losses which are expected to increase, demanding matching increases in pesticide use on many crops (tomatoes, beans, cassava, cotton, cucurbits, potatoes, sweet potatoes). Efforts to develop environmentally friendly integrated pest management systems, with the goal of reducing insecticide use, aim to re-establish the ecological equilibrium of predators, parasitoids, and microbial controls that were once in place. New crop varieties are also being developed with increased tolerance to whiteflies, and to the plant diseases carried by them. A major problem is that whiteflies and the viruses they carry can infect many host plants, including agricultural crops, palms, and weeds. These problems are complicated by difficulties in classifying and detecting new whitefly biotypes and begomoviruses. Proper diagnosis of plant diseases depends on using sophisticated molecular techniques to detect and characterize the viruses and whiteflies which are present in a crop. A team of researchers, extension agents and growers working together are needed to follow disease development, using dynamic modeling, to understand the incidence of disease spread.

In 1997, tomato yellow leaf-curl begomovirus was discovered in Florida, USA. This is the worst viral disease transmitted by the whitefly, Bemisia argentifolii. The whitefly has also been shown to transmit almost 60 other viral plant diseases.

In the Philppines in 2023 flower plantations in Naga, Camarines Sur were infested by whiteflies. Eggplant crops in Baler, Aurora were also affected. In 2024, the locos Norte City Agriculture Office discovered cauliflower Aleyrodidae infestation in Laoag due to changing weather.

=== Damage by feeding ===
Whiteflies feed by tapping into the phloem of plants, introducing toxic saliva and decreasing the plants' overall turgor pressure. Since whiteflies congregate in large numbers, susceptible plants can be quickly overwhelmed. Further harm is done by mold growth encouraged by the honeydew whiteflies secrete. This may also seriously impede the ability of farms to process cotton harvests.

Whiteflies share a modified form of hemimetabolous metamorphosis, in that the immature stages begin life as mobile individuals, but soon attach to host plants. The stage before the adult is called a pupa, though it shares little in common with the pupal stage of holometabolous insects.

=== Control ===
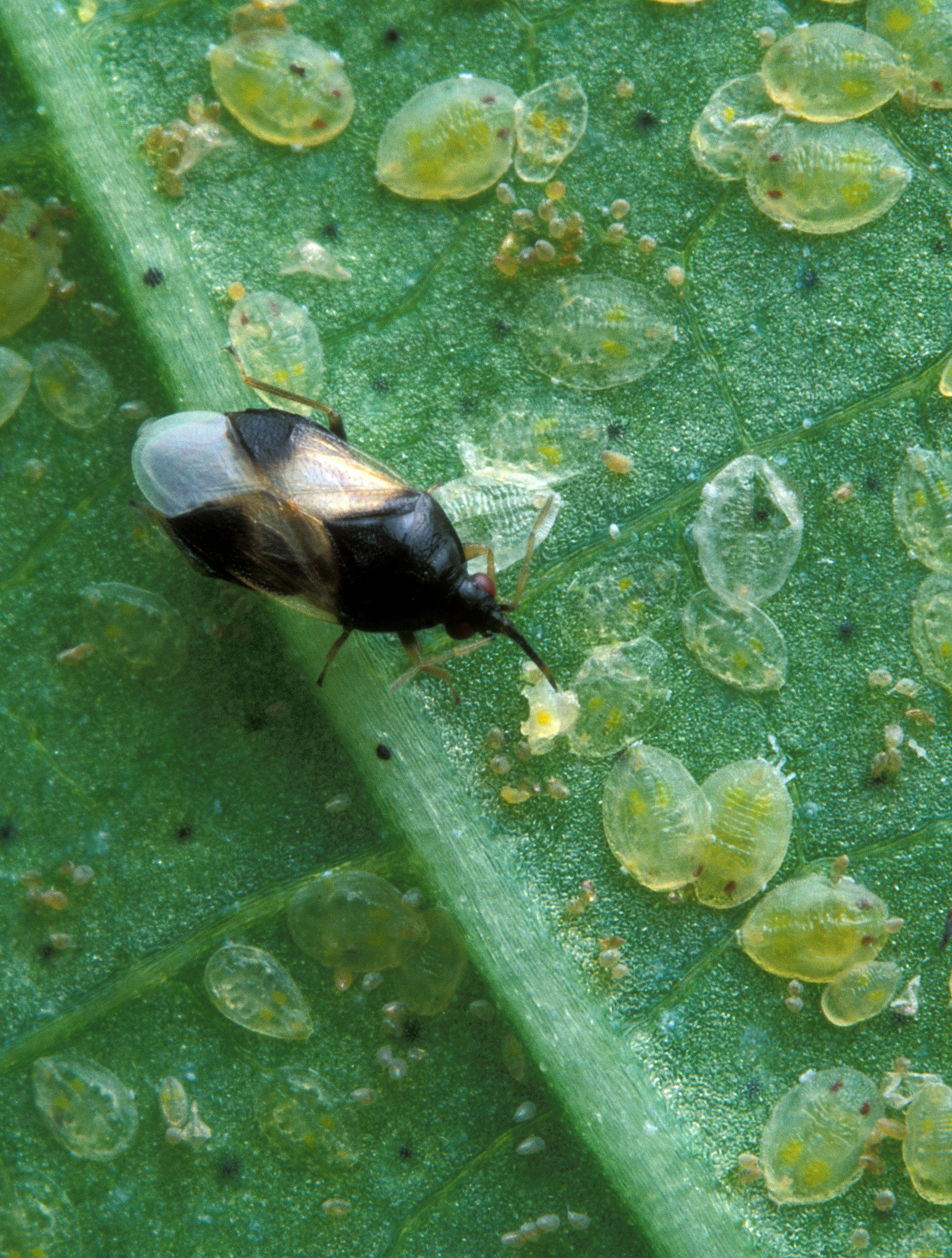
Pirate bug feeding on whitefly larvae

Whitefly control is difficult and complex, as whiteflies rapidly develop resistance to chemical pesticides. The USDA recommends "an integrated program that focuses on prevention and relies on cultural and biological control methods when possible". While an initial pesticide application may be necessary to control heavy infestations, repeated applications may lead to strains of whiteflies that are resistant to pesticides, so only use of selective insecticides is advised. Specific insecticide information and guidance for the fig whitefly is available from the University of Florida. Care should be taken to ensure that the insecticide used will not kill the natural predators of whiteflies. For effective use of biological method after application of pesticide, plant washing is advised prior to release of predators or parasitoids.

Pesticides used for whitefly control usually contain neonicotinoid compounds as active ingredients: clothianidin (commercial), dinotefuran (over-the-counter and commercial), imidacloprid (over-the-counter and commercial) and thiamethoxam (commercial). Neonicotinoids can be harmful if ingested. Rotation of insecticides from different families may be effective at preventing the building of tolerance to the product. Clothianidin and dinotefuran are of the same family. Spraying the leaves using insecticidal soap is another, environmentally friendly, option.

=== Nonchemical means ===
Biological methods have also been proposed to control whitefly infestation, and may be paired with chemical methods. Washing the plant, especially the undersides of leaves, may help reduce the number of the pests on the plants and make their management by other methods more effective. Whiteflies are also attracted by the color yellow, so yellow sticky paper can serve as traps to monitor infestations. Dead leaves or leaves that have been mostly eaten by whiteflies can be removed and burned or carefully placed in closed bins to avoid reinfestation and spreading of the disease.

Early detection in combination with hosing or vacuuming of diseased portions as well as removal of any section that is heavily infested. Pesticide use is not ideal in the case of controlling whitefly and widespread contamination can be costly; it is best to avoid this problem with aggressive preventive measures.

Several predators and parasitoids may be effective in controlling whitefly infestations, including green lacewings, ladybirds, minute pirate bugs, big-eyed bugs, damsel bugs, Encarsia formosa and phytoseiid mites.

Integrated management of whiteflies can as well be done using biopesticides based on microbials such as Beauveria bassiana (effective on larvae and adults) or Isaria fumosorosea.

Green lacewing larvae have voracious appetites, so will attack whiteflies, as well as other pests, including aphids, mealybugs, spider mites, leafhopper larvae, moth eggs, scales, and thrips. They also can attack other insects, including caterpillars. They are available as eggs from commercial insectaries, and will stay in a larval stage after they hatch for one to three weeks. The adult insects can fly and will feed only on pollen, honey, and nectar to reproduce. Repeated application may be necessary and the eggs could be eaten before they hatch by their natural predators, such as ants or mature green lacewings.

Ladybirds are also used. They eat mostly insect eggs, but will also feed on beetle larvae, aphids, scale insects, and young caterpillars. Adults are often collected when in a dormant state in the wild and shipped for use in pest control; however, they may not stay in the location where they are released. They do live for about a year and will continuously lay eggs and reproduce. Spraying the bugs' wings with a sticky substance before release may hinder their ability to fly.

Some promising claims have been made that mesh or film that excludes ultraviolet of certain wavelengths from a greenhouse interfere severely with the ability of whitefly and various other greenhouse pests, to find their food plants. It is not yet clear, assuming that the effect is substantially of value, how readily pests in such circumstances might develop behavioural tolerance to such control measures.

==== Companion plants ====
A number of plants can be intercropped with vegetables, in a garden setting, serving as companion plants to protect against whiteflies.

For example, nasturtiums are thought to provide a defense to gooseberries or tomatoes. They provide root chemicals that deter whiteflies.

A study intercropping French marigolds with short-vine tomatoes in glasshouse growing conditions achieved some control of whiteflies when the plants were grown together from the beginning of the growing season; however, limonene dispensers were more effective.

Zinnias, conversely, attract predators that consume whiteflies, including hummingbirds and predatory wasps and flies. Other plants with a similar function include the hummingbird bush, pineapple sage, and bee balm. Each of these plants also conceals the scent of nearby plants, making their detection by some pest insects more difficult, as do most other mints.
