= R. W. Alexander Jesudasan =

Indian entomologist

Professor R. W. Alexander Jesudasan D. Sc. (Madras)
- Occupation: Teaching
- Years active: 1950–2012
- Known for: Entomology
- Title: Professor
- Board member of: President, Madras Science Forum, Secretary, MCC Alumni Association; National Assessment and Accreditation Council Peer Team Member; Member, The Senate, University of Madras; President, AIACHE (2015-2017)
- Awards: Best Principal, All Indian Association for Christian Higher Education; Dr. B.R.Ambedkar Award for Excellence 2010; Maxim Gorky Life Time Achievement Award for Excellence

Academic background
- Education: M. Sc. (Madras); Ph. D. (Madras); D. Sc. (Madras); Guru Nanak College, Chennai; Madras Christian College, Tambaram (Tamil Nadu)

Academic work
- Discipline: Zoology
- Sub-discipline: Entomology
- Institutions: Madras Christian College, Tambaram (Tamil Nadu) (1986-2020),
- Main interests: Peace Studies

R. W. Alexander Jesudasan is an Indian entomologist credited with the discovery of more than 60 species of whiteflies in South India. He was a prominent educationist and served as Principal of Madras Christian College (2009–2020) and have been part of many education-related committees including NAAC Peer Team.

== Education, research and career ==
Alexander is an alumnus of Guru Nanak College, Chennai and Madras Christian College, prestigious institutions in Chennai, India. He joined as a professor in Department of Zoology, Madras Christian College in 1986, where he served until his retirement in 2020.

He took charge as the Principal of Madras Christian College in 2009, serving the college in that capacity for 11 years.

Considering his contributions to entomology, University of Madras Awarded Alexander DSc in 2010 in recognition of his “contributions to the knowledge of Indian whiteflies (aleyrodidae: Hemiptera: Insecta) with an emphasis on whitefly-ant interaction”.

== Leadership and contributions ==
During his leadership, the college was ranked 10th (2018) and 13th (2019) in the colleges category of the National Institutional Ranking Framework. College was also repeatedly ranked the Best College in Chennai and featured among top five in various surveys, like the "India Today" and "The Week" survey.

He also took initiative for many programmes like Sharing Knowledge You Had Abroad (SKY) programme, Sport for All etc. His contributions to infrastructural development in the campus are also notable. He was instrumental in the establishment of various facilities like Indoor Stadium, modernized Science Laboratories, Modernization of Women's Lounge, revamping Miller Memorial Library, Solar Power Plant, two new Women's Halls, modernization of Student Centre, Air-conditioning of Anderson Hall and Bishop Heber Chapel.

== Contributions to entomology ==
Alexander is credited with the discovery many species of Whiteflies:

- Aleurocanthus: 9 Species
- Aleuroclava: 16 Species
- Aleurolobus: 11 Species
- Aleuropapillatus: 1 Species
- Cockerelliella: 1 Species
- Cohicaleyrodes: 1 Species
- Crenidorsum: 5 Species
- Dialeurodes: 1 Species
- Dialeurolonga: 2 Species
- Massilieurodes: 1 Species
- Pealius: 3 Species
- Rhachisphora: 2 Species
- Singhiella: 2 Species
- Singhius: 1 Species
- Tetraleurodes: 3 Species
- Zaphanera: 1 Species

== See also ==
- Prof. Dr. M. Abel
- The Rev. John Anderson
- Very Rev. Dr. William Miller

Educational offices
Preceded by	Secretary, Madras Christian College Association	Succeeded by
Academic offices
Preceded by V. J. Philip	Principal, Madras Christian College, Tambaram, Tamil Nadu; 2009-2020	Succeeded by P. Wilson
