= M. C. C. Higher Secondary School =

Coordinates: 13.069832°N 80.236636°E

Madras Christian College Higher Secondary School
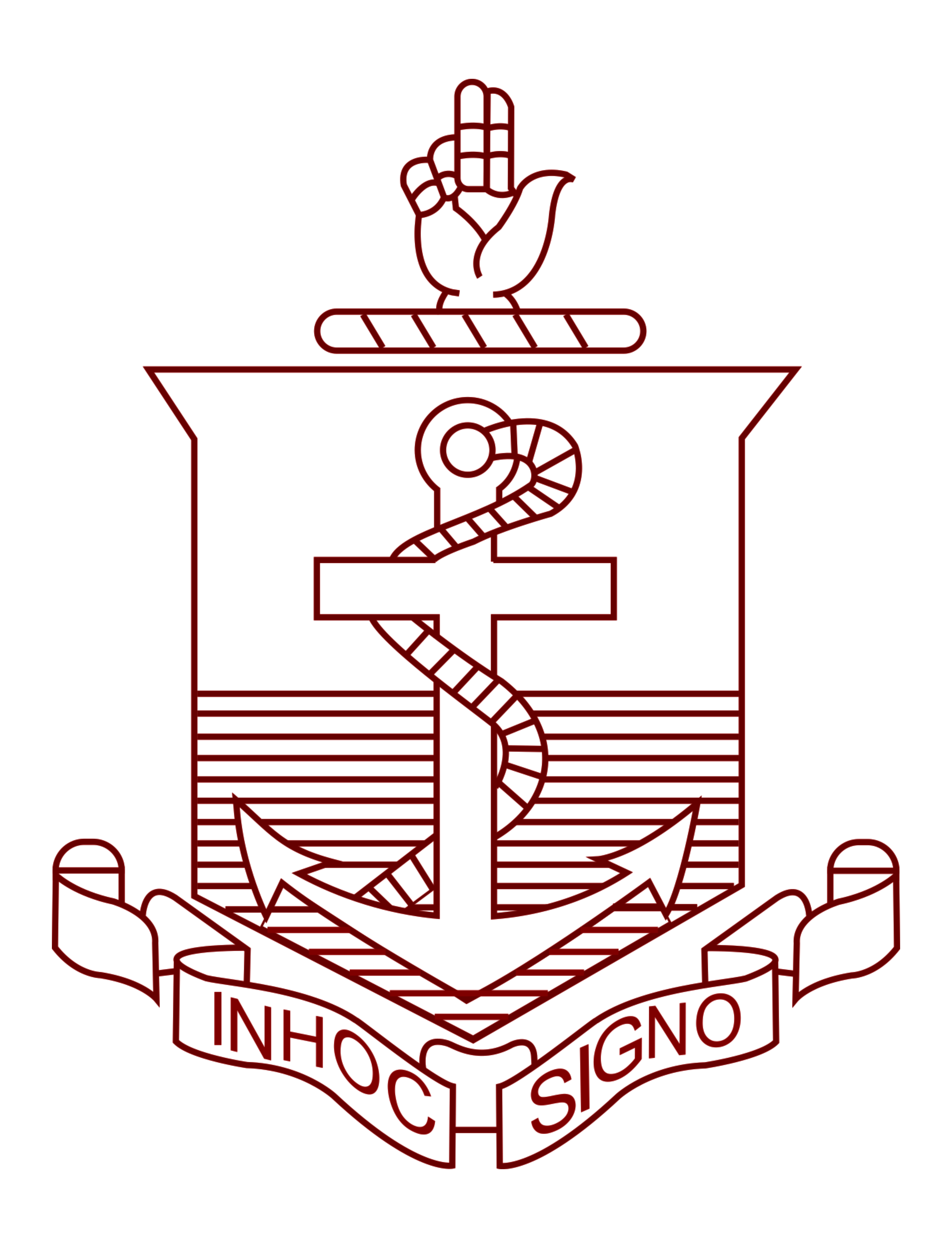

Location
- 78, Harrington Road; Chetpet; Chennai, Tamil Nadu, 600031; India

Information
- Motto: In Hoc Signo (In This Sign Conquer)
- Religious affiliation: Christian
- Established: 3 April 1835; 191 years ago
- Founder: Rev. James Laurie and Rev. Mathew Bowce
- School board: Miss. S. Balreddy, Mr. S.W. Kanagaraj, Mr. K.M. Mammen, Ms. Shanti Manuel, Ms. Adella Paul, Dr. R. Wilfred Sugumar, Lt. Col. (retd.) P.J. Soundararaj, Mr. S. W. Chandrasekar, Dr. A. Besant C. Raj, Dr. R.W. Alexander Jesudason, Mr. G.J. Manohar, Mrs. Revathy Bonns
- School district: Chennai
- Headmaster: Mr.G.Jebadoss Thinakaran
- Education system: Tamil Nadu State Board Syllabus
- Language: English, Tamil
- Website: http://www.mccschool.edu.in/

MCC Higher Secondary School (full name: Madras Christian College Higher Secondary School) is located in Chetpet, Chennai, Tamil Nadu, India. It was founded in 1835.

The school in its current form, was an offshoot of the Madras Christian College, and became a separate entity when the college moved to a new location.

The school is part of an exchange program by the United States Department of State.

== History ==
=== Founding ===
MCC School has its roots in a small school for boys established in 1835 when two chaplains of the Church of Scotland in Madras, Rev. George James Laurie and Rev. Matthew Bowie founded the St. Andrew's School on Randalls Road in Egmore, Madras. At their request, the Church of Scotland sent a missionary to India to govern it. Missionary Rev. John Anderson, set up the institution as the General Assembly School, conducting classes in a rented house on the east side of Armenian Street in Georgetown, Madras. The headmaster and 59 boys from St. Andrew's School moved to this institution. It was named after the General Assembly of the Church of Scotland, the supreme governing body of the Church of Scotland, and aimed at attracting students from the Hindu higher castes with the aim of "conveying as great as an amount of truth as possible through the channel of a good education especially of Bible truth".

== School life ==
Students follow the Indian tradition of wishing teachers with folded hands in Namaskaram position.

MCC has two fee structures: aided and self-financed. Self-financed is co-educational (boys and girls), and aided is only for boys.

While studying in MCC students are called as MCCIANS.

== Notable alumni ==
- M. K. Stalin
- R. K. Narayan
- G. K. Vasan
- T R B Rajaa
- V. Kishore Chandra Deo
- P. Chidambaram
- N. Srinivasan
- M.K. Alagiri
- Prashanth Thyagarajan
- M.K. Narayanan
- Gautham Vasudev Menon
- N. Ram
- A. R. Rahman
- Leander Paes
- Somdev Devvarman
- R. K. Krishna Kumar
- P. K. Basheer
- Venu Srinivasan
- N. Srinivasan
- A. C. Muthiah
- Vinod Raj
- Rajesh M. Selva
- Coluthur Gopalan

== Faculty ==
- Rev. John Anderson
- Rev. William Miller
