= Madras Christian College =

Liberal arts and sciences college in Chennai, India

Coordinates: 12.921293°N 80.121971°E

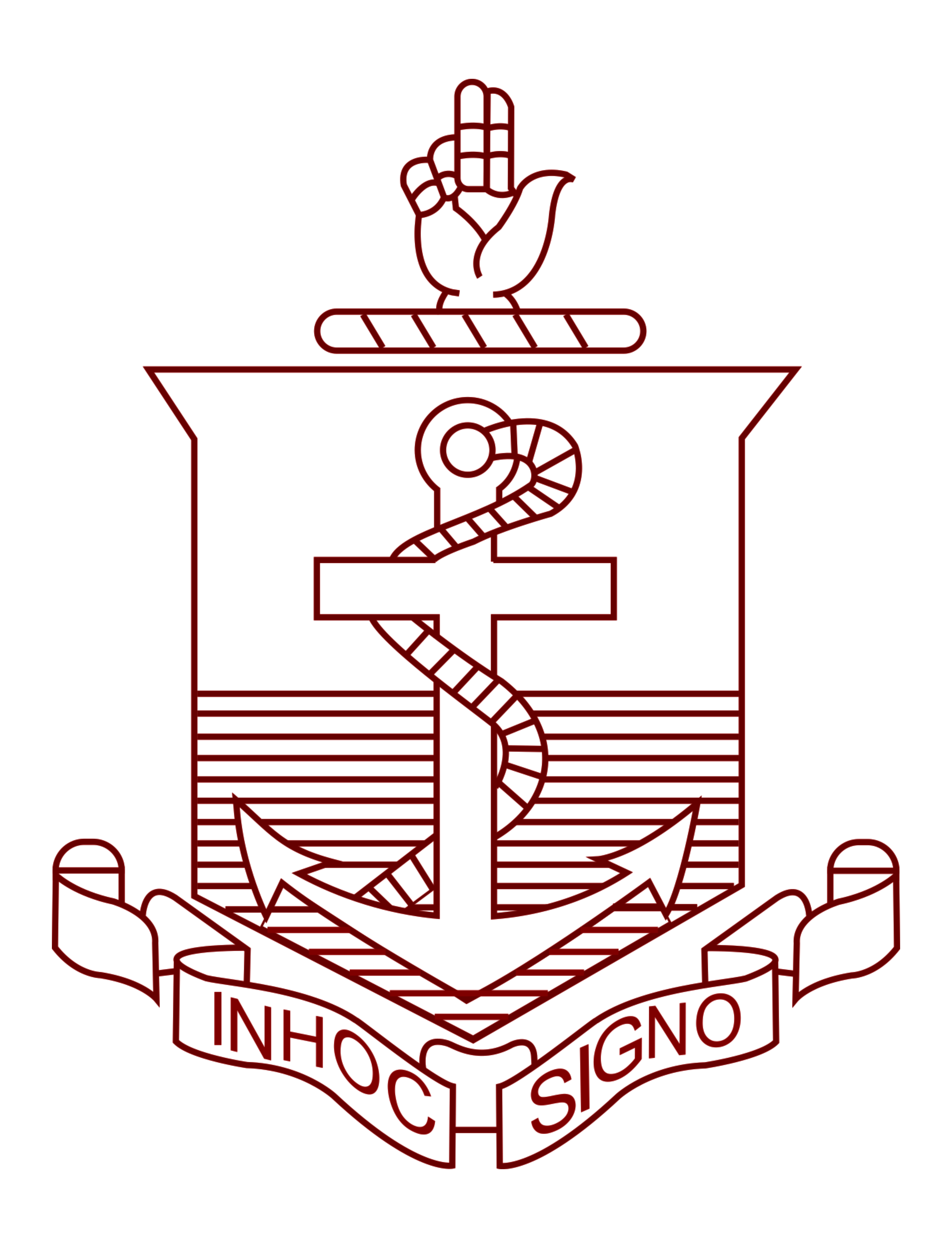
- Motto: In Hoc Signo
- Motto in English: In This Sign
- Type: Government Aided (Minority Institution)
- Established: 3 April 1837; 189 years ago
- Affiliations: University of Madras
- Principal: Dr. Paul Wilson
- Faculty: 300 Full Time
- Students: 8500
- Location: Tambaram, Chennai - 600059, Tamil Nadu, India
- Campus: Suburban, 365 acres
- Website: mcc.edu.in

Madras Christian College (MCC) is a liberal arts and sciences college in Chennai, India. Founded in 1837, MCC is one of Asia's oldest extant colleges. The college is affiliated to the University of Madras but functions as an autonomous institution from its main campus in Tambaram, Chennai.

It was established originally as a school for boys in the place where Anderson Church is located. From its origins as a missionary endeavor of the Church of Scotland, MCC's alumni and professors include several civil servants, administrators, educators, business people and political leaders. It was ranked 14th among colleges in India by the National Institutional Ranking Framework (NIRF) in 2024.

== History ==
=== Beginnings ===
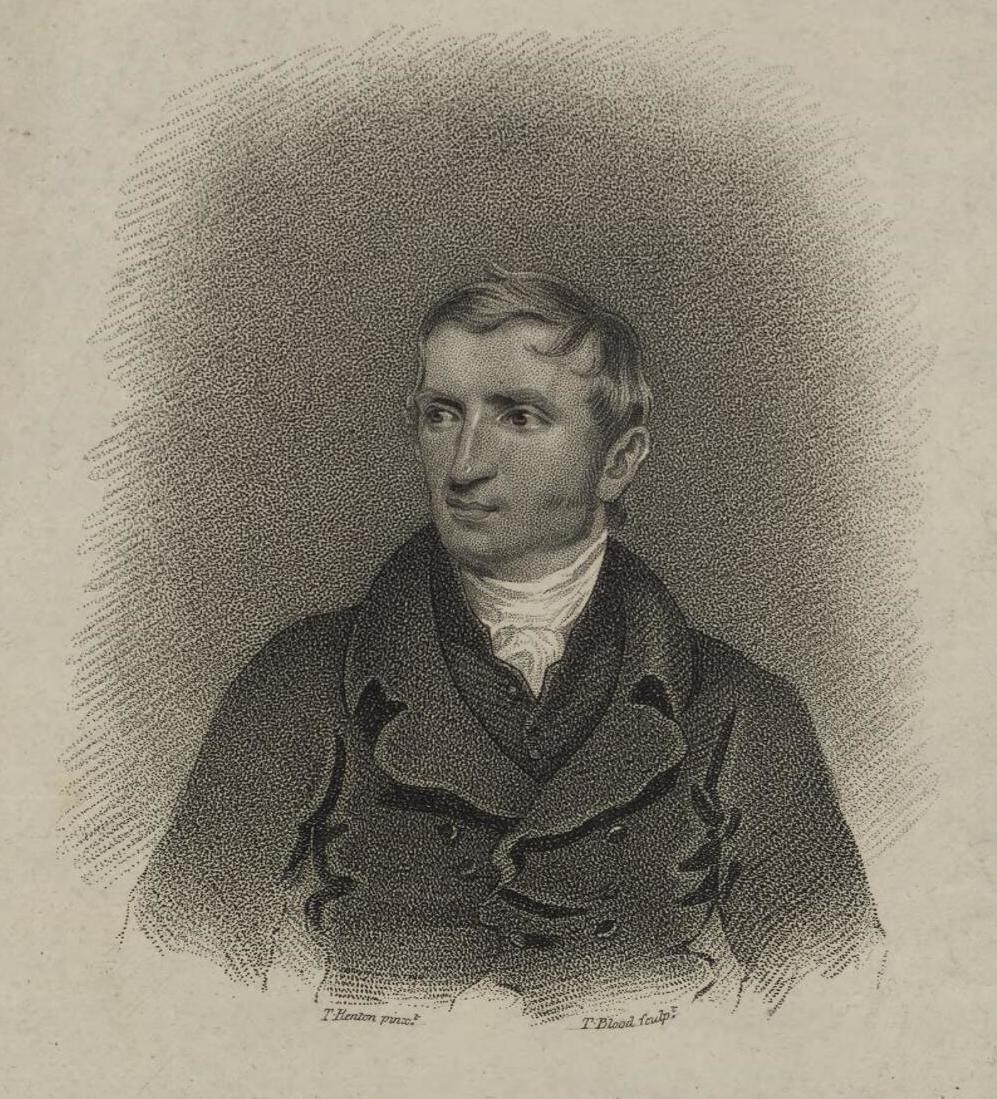
Portrait of John Anderson

MCC has its roots in a small school for boys established in 1835 when two chaplains of the Church of Scotland in Madras, Rev. George James Laurie and Rev. Matthew Bowie founded the St. Andrew's School on Randalls Road in Egmore, Madras. At their request, the Church of Scotland sent a missionary to India to govern it. Missionary Rev. John Anderson, set up the institution as the General Assembly's School, conducting classes in a rented house on the east side of Armenian Street in Georgetown, Madras. The headmaster and 59 boys from St. Andrew's School moved to this institution. It was named after the supreme governing body of the Church of Scotland and aimed at attracting students from the Hindu higher castes with the aim of "conveying as great as an amount of truth as possible through the channel of a good education especially of Bible truth". The college grew from the school into a 275-acre (1.11 km^{2}) wooded campus under the leadership of educationalist William Miller, who created hostels and several academic and cultural associations, which shaped MCC into a premier educational institution in South Asia.

The rapid expansion of the college and the paucity of the space necessitated moving the campus to a more spacious location. Accordingly, the college under the leadership of Rev. William Skinner (principal 1909–1921) initiated the Tambaram Project in 1919. Rev. Gordon Matthew as the town planning secretary negotiated with the government, which set aside 390 acres (1.6 km^{2}) of the former Selaiyur forest land in Tambaram. While Mrs. and Prof. Edward Barnes meticulously planted rare trees and worked out the physical landscape, the Swiss architect Henry Schaetti, then based in Kodaikanal, India, designed the buildings. After 100 years in the heart of the city, the college moved to the sprawling, green campus in Tambaram on the outskirts of Madras in 1937.

On 30 January 1937, the governor of Madras, Lord John Erskine declared open the first campus buildings. The hostel gave way to three halls of residence — Selaiyur, Thomas' and Heber — active today as semi-autonomous student communities. Women students were admitted on a regular basis from 1939, and a hostel for them came up in Guindy, Madras in 1950. This too evolved into an on-campus hall of residence for women, Martin Hall, named after Agnes Martin, in 1968, Margaret Hall in 2009 and Barnes Hall in 2016.

=== Tambaram Conference 1938 ===
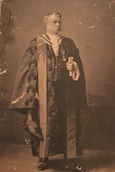
William Miller was chiefly notable for transforming Madras Christian College.

In 1938, MCC hosted the Tambaram Conference (also called The Madras Conference or Tambaram 1938), the third World Missionary Conference which eventually created the World Council of Churches. The same buildings were used again in 1988 (Tambaram 1988) to commemorate this landmark event which focused on contemporary thought into ecumenism, Christianity's engagement with world religions and traditions. In the words of Bishop Stephen Neill, this event was "the most international gathering held up to that point in the entire history of the Christian Church." William Miller's vision in creating an educational institution that prepared the largely Hindu students to a Christward direction through education, rather than just conversion of their faith, was lauded. Lesslie Newbigin, the famous missionary and theologian who attended the 1938 conference, spoke at the 1988 event at MCC as well.

=== Governance and leadership ===
The Rev. A.J. Boyd led the college for 18 years (1938–56). After Boyd, Macphail became principal, who was then succeeded by the first Indian principal of the college, Chandran Devanesan in 1962.

The college was one of the first in India to be granted Autonomy in 1978 and the first batch of Autonomous graduates passed out in 1981. The year 2006 marked the Silver Jubilee of Autonomy for Madras Christian College. The 175th year celebrations were organized in the year 2012.

=== Principals ===
List of Principals from inception of the College till present,

No.	Years	Name	Academic credentials
1.	1837-1855	The Rev. John Anderson	
2.	1856-1860	The Rev. John Braidwood	
3.	1860-1862	The Rev. A. N. Campbell	
4.	1862-1909	The Rev. William Miller	M. A. (Aberdeen), L. L. D.
5.	1909-1921	The Rev. William Skinner	
6.	1921-1923	The Rev. Earle Monteith Macphail	
7.	1923-1930	The Rev. William Meston	
8.	1930-1938	The Rev. Alfred George Hogg	
9.	1938-1956	The Rev. Alexander John Boyd	
10.	1956-1962	The Rev. James Russel Macphail	
11.	1962-1973	Chandran D. S. Devanesen	M. A. (Cantab.), Ph. D. (Harvard)
12.	1973-1978	Bennet Albert	
13.	1978-1981	M. Abel	B. A. (Andhra), M. A. (Madras), Ph. D. (California)
14.	1981-1989	Mithra G. Augustine	B. A., M. A., Ph. D.
15.	1989-1994	Rev. Francis Soundararaj	M.A., BD, Ph.D., Postdoc Fellow (Edin)
16.	1994-1999	M Gladstone	B. Sc., M. Sc., Ph. D.
17.	1999-2005	Alexander Mantramurti	B. A., M. A., Ph. D.
18.	2005-2009	V. J. Phillip	B. Sc. (Madras), M. Sc. (Madras), Ph. D. (Madras)
19.	2009–2020	R. W. Alexander Jesudasan	B. Sc. (Madras), M. Sc. (Madras), Ph. D. (Madras), D. Sc. (Madras)
20.	2020–present	P. Wilson	B. Sc. (Madras), M. Sc. (Madras), Ph. D. (IIT Madras), PDF (Israel)

== Campus ==
The 365-acre (1.48 km^{2}) campus is known for its flora and fauna, notably deer and rare trees. The college is distinguished by a lake on campus. The campus curator maintains these natural resources and ensures that no damage is done through the unauthorized cutting of plants or grass. The first curator of the campus was Edward Barnes. Several faculty members from the Department of Botany and Zoology have since served as curators of the campus. They are K.R. Venkattasubban, Giles Lal, D.E.P. Jeyasingh, P. Dayanandan, C. Livingstone, G. Ebenezer, and Manu Thomas. Selva Singh Richard from Botany Department is the current curator of MCC.

It is the second-largest scrub jungle in Asia, actively used by departments like Botany and Zoology for their practical work.

The Scrub Society at Madras Christian College, along with other departments and units on the campus, strives for the development, preservation, and protection of this campus for future generations. It was headed by C. Livingstone from inception to his superannuation in the year 2007. The college also has a College Union Society in which, all students are members.

The most recognizable building is the 'Main Building' to which the main entrance leads. It houses administrative offices and some departments as well as lecture rooms. The Miller Memorial Library is another landmark building, built in anticipation of then-prime minister Rajiv Gandhi's visit in 1987.

=== Biodiversity ===
MCC has actively supported the diversity of flora and fauna on campus. Several eminent staff from various departments have contributed to the development and the upkeep of campus diversity. Edward Barnes (Department of Chemistry), the first curator of MCC Campus (along with his wife) began this process. K.R. Venkatasubban (professor and head, Department of Botany), P. Sanjeeva Raj (retired professor and head, Department of Zoology), Gift Siromony (professor and head, Department of Statistics), Mr. Giles Lal (Department of Botany) and C. Livingstone (Department of Botany) have documented the biodiversity of the campus as well as other areas in the region.

=== Public spaces ===
==== Anderson Hall ====
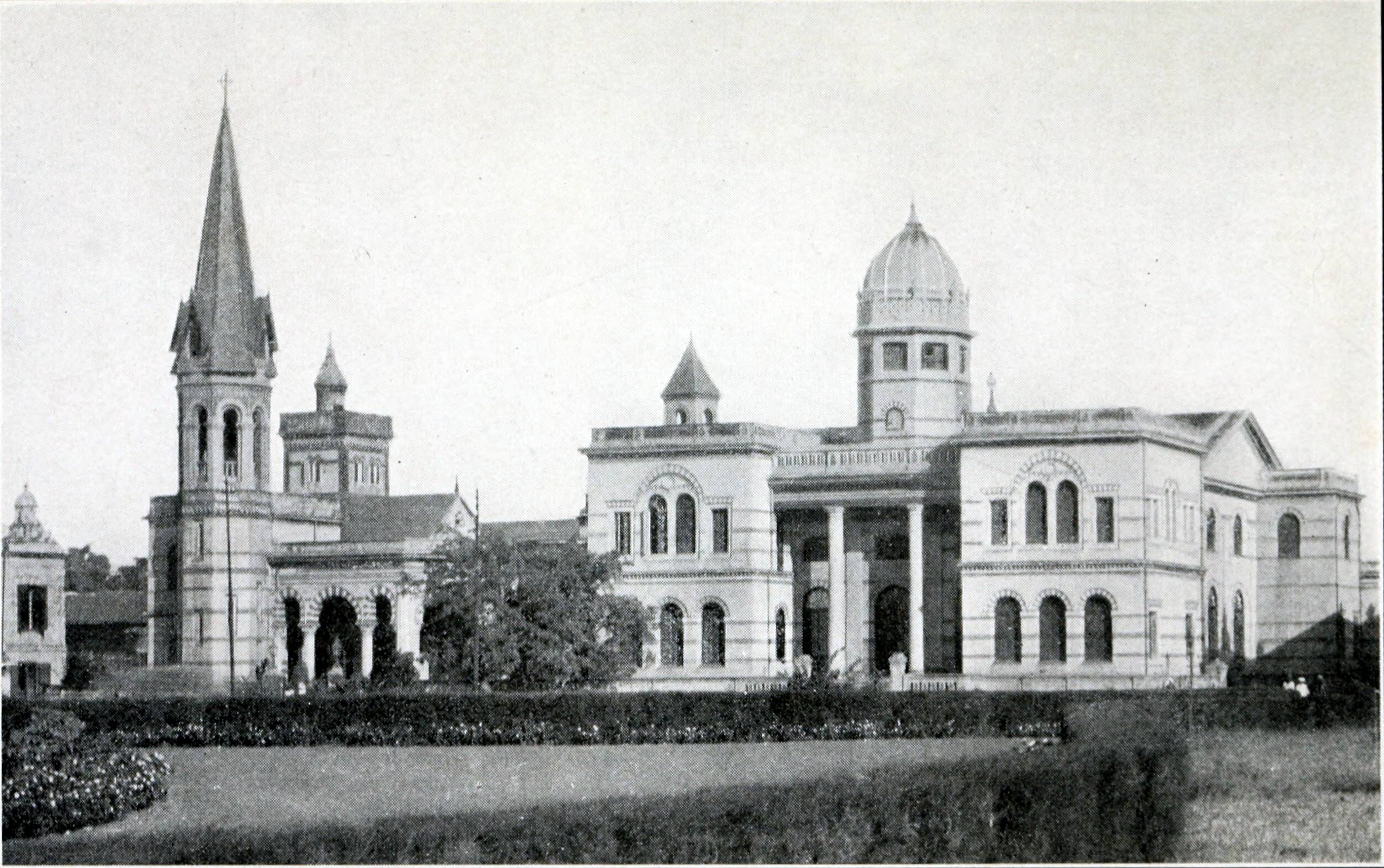
Anderson Hall, named after John Anderson

MCC's largest auditorium, named after its founder Rev. John Anderson, was built in anticipation of the third World Missionary Conference which was held here in 1938. In the words of Bishop Stephen Neill, this event was "the most international gathering held up to that point in the entire history of the Christian Church." The hall also hosted evangelist Billy Graham's visit to the campus in 1956. He delivered his address in this auditorium. The hall is used for a variety of events and has hosted several notable people — the nation's highest leaders, politicians, theologians, preachers, educators, businesspeople, civil servants, etc. — and continues to be the predominant indoor public space on campus.

==== MCC Quadrangle ====
The quadrangle or diamond directly in front of the main building is the largest outdoor public space, used primarily for large student gatherings, such as the shows hosted during the annual Deepwoods intercollegiate cultural festival.

==== Boxing Ring ====
The Boxing Ring, in front of the Principal's Quarters, doubles as an outdoor stage with green space in the front for a sizable audience, primarily used for student gatherings.

==== International Guest House ====
This modern building, designed by a Swedish architect to western standards, is situated in the midst of a densely wooded area near the athletic fields. Wild deer grazing outside the dining room is not an uncommon sight.

==== Cafeteria and gutters ====
The cafeteria and gutters are the spots students congregate during breaks or free hours. The gutters are popular hangouts for intellectual conversation and often the birthplace of artistic or culturally significant initiatives by students.

==== Macphail's Arts Centre ====
The Fine Arts Centre is named after J.R. Macphail.

==== Sportsfields and C.A. Abraham Pavilion ====
The Madras Christian College campus has several sports fields and facilities, including cricket, association football, tennis, basketball (indoor and outdoor), boxing, and others. The cricket pavilion is named after the former physical director of the college, C.A. Abraham. These sports fields used by the student community, especially during the inter hall sports.

== Residential halls ==
The college has six residential halls for students - Selaiyur Hall, St. Thomas's Hall, Bishop Heber Hall, Martin Hall (earlier known as the Women's Hostel), Margaret Hall and Barnes Hall.

=== St. Thomas's Hall ===
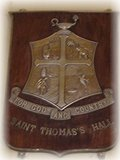
Hall emblem

St. Thomas's hall was built in 1937, named after St. Thomas who brought Christianity into India. The first warden of St. Thomas's Hall was Rev. J.R. Macphail and the first general secretary was A. Mohammed Nabi. The Hall constitution was drafted in 1950–51 on the basis of the Indian Constitutional and Parliamentary system, administered by resident students (called the 'general body') who elect representative leaders holding eight ministerial positions and the post of the Speaker. The hall's current 'E' block was earlier a campus school known as St. Thomas's Annexe. The Hall Emblem is represented using various elements that describe foundational and philosophical bases of the Hall: in the top portion, a lamp signifying enlightenment, divided by a cross signifying the Christian foundation of the college. On the top left: the crucified palm of Jesus Christ. On the top right: An elephant reaching out to a palm branch, signifying striving for higher ambition. On the bottom left: Maize, signifying India's reliance on agriculture. On the bottom right: A dove, signifying peace. The hall organizes an annual dance competition, named Utsav. Hall publications include USHA, the hall magazine and Tribune, the Hall newsletter. The hall has Table Tennis tables, Basketball grounds gymnasium, library, and entertainment room. The hall motto is "For God and Country."

Bharathi Mandram organizes debates, lectures, seminars to promote Tamil culture while Jatra is the theatre society. The St. Thomas's Hall's Literary Programme organizes debates and distributes donations for various charitable causes. The Nature Club prepares the hall for Vatika, Martin Hall's biennial gardening competition. It also has an active Tennis club that organizes and facilitates games.

=== Selaiyur Hall ===
Selaiyur Hall, the oldest one on the college campus, was founded in 1937 and was named after the Selaiyur forest reserve, a part of which was set aside for the college.

The Hall's coat of arms consists of a shield incorporated with an anchor and held together by a rope. Above the emblem are images of a lotus, a pair of laurel leaves and a torch, which stand for purity, victory, and truth respectively. The Latin motto at the base reads Esse Quam Videri which means "Sincerity not sham" and alternatively "To be rather than to seem".

The Selaiyur Constitution is derived from the British constitution. The governing body, or the Cabinet, is headed by the nominal-executive President (Hall Warden), the Chairman and The General Secretary and his cabinet consisting of six Secretaries. Finance, Appraisal, and Jury committees are appointed by the Chairman in consultation with the General Secretary and the President. Four general body sessions are held through the academic year in the presence of at least 2/3rd of the residents to pass budgets and coordinate planning.

It is the only hall on campus that hosts an annual alumni meeting organised by the Selaiyur Hall Old Boys Association (SHOBA). An annual magazine called Thots is published at the end of each academic year. Discussion sessions are held through Parnassus meetings while a social initiative called STEPS is used to bring Selaiyur's mess workers into the academic fold.

The Tamil society, Kamban Mandram, regularly conducts events of literary and cultural significance. It hosts the Kathir event annually on the eve of the Pongal festival. The Annual Hall Day is held around the end of the academic year and is an occasion for the residents to invite friends and family to partake in the celebrations.

The most eagerly awaited event during the academic year is the Moonshadow cultural festival which sees all the Halls competing in literary and debating (L&D) and performing arts events. Traditionally, a rock band is invited to play at the end of the festival and numerous Indian bands have graced the Selaiyur stage over the years, including Galeej Gurus, The Circus, Kryptos, Parousia and Slain.

Since 2009, Selaiyur Hall has an in-house Integrated Knowledge Centre (IKC) named after Bennet Albert, one of the Hall's former and most celebrated wardens. It is based in the library for the residents to avail of Internet and printing facilities, books, videos, and music.

=== Bishop Heber Hall ===
==== Hall History ====
While the history of Madras Christian College dates back to 1837, the history of Bishop Heber Hall could be traced back to 1762 when a German Christian missionary set up a school at Trichy in 1762. The school eventually evolved into Bishop Heber College in 1878. It was named after Bishop Reginald Heber (1783–1826) the hymn writer and erstwhile Bishop of Calcutta. In 1934, this college was dissolved and merged with Madras Christian College. The teachers and students who shifted to Madras formed the Bishop Heber Hostel at Vepery. After a short stay at Vepery and at Royapettah as well, the hostel moved out with the rest of Madras Christian College to Tambaram in 1937. Bishop Heber Hall's architectural design was laid out by Henry Schaetti (who was also the architect of Madras Christian College) which is unique to Bishop Heber Hall. The Bishop Heber Hall song was written and composed by Chandran D S Devanesan who was also the first Indian Principal of the college.

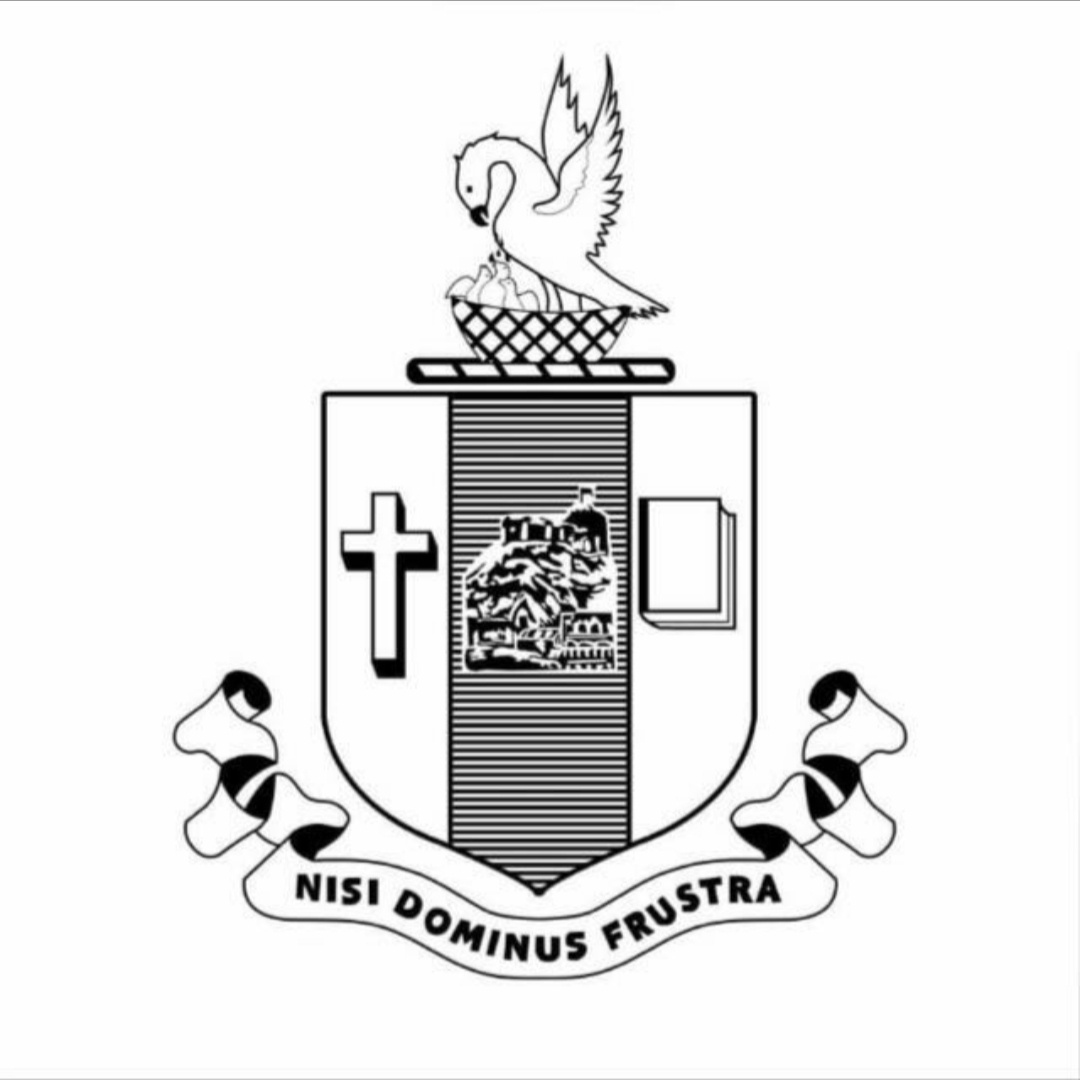
Bishop Heber Hall Coat of Arms

==== Hall Constitution & Cabinets ====
The Bishop Heber Hall's Constitution is adopted from the 'Scottish Constitutional Model.' The general body comprises the Warden as the president and all the resident students of the hall as members. The Executive machinery is composed of two parts, the President (hall warden) as the nominal executive and the Hall Cabinet as the real executive.

==== Hall Music & Literary and Debating Community ====
Bishop Heber Hall's Literary and Debating community which is known as the 'Pelican Club' is the oldest serving Literary and Debating Club in the college. As the Literary and Debating secretary is the foremost spokesman in terms of Events and Activities in the hall, he also carries the duties of conducting and hosting several events as the Master of Ceremony (MC or Emcee). Bishop Heber Hall's magazine 'Azad', published at the end of each academic year showcases every residents' love for the Hall through poetry and different short write-ups. The Tamil Society of Bishop Heber Hall, the 'Thiruvalluvar Tamizh Mandram', hosts 'Vaagai' (வாகை) on the occasion of Pongal, which is an inter-hall competition where various literary and sports events are conducted. The Mandram gives the students a basic idea of the culture of Tamil Nadu by showcasing its values and traditions.

==== Octavia ====
'Octavia' is an annual musical fest hosted by Bishop Heber Hall. It is an inter-collegiate and inter-hall acoustic and electric fest which is wound down with a showdown featuring a rock band; most recently featuring the likes of popular rock bands, Pineapple Express and Agam. The tradition of Rock music lies deep in the roots of Bishop Heber Hall's culture which is portrayed through Octavia. Heber's very own Rusty Moe have performed a few times for Octavia over the years, and even at cultural events at the other halls. Octavia gets an annual attendance of over 1500 people, making it one of the city's largest and most awaited rock festivals.

==== Bishop Heber Chapel ====
The Chapel is a speciality of Bishop Heber Hall. The rose garden in the frontyard of the chapel is also home to the Bell Tower. Sunday services are held regularly and the order of worship is a blend of Anglican and South Indian orders. The chapel walls are painted and tiles are carefully polished each year by the residents themselves. The floor tiles were imported from Scotland and the altar was carved from a single piece of rock that was transported from Tiruchirappalli. This is a constant reminder of the roots of Bishop Heber Hall. The Chapel sustains the Bishop Heber Chapel Choir.

=== Martin Hall ===
Established in 1968, Martin Hall was the only hall for women on campus until 2009, when Margaret Hall was set up. The hall was named after Agnes Martin, wife of Gavin Martin of the college. Mrs. Martin was also the YWCA's Madras secretary and a caring social worker. The halls has facilities like The Agnes Martin Auditorium, a library, an Indoor Games and Recreation Centre and outdoor badminton and throw-ball courts. Martin Hall is home to 210 students from India and other countries in Asia and Africa.

The Vatika Inter-hall Garden competition was first hosted by Martin Hall in the 1997–98 academic year to commemorate 30 years of women's residency on campus. It has been held every alternate year since then.

Galarompics is an inter-hall sports meet hosted by Martin Hall. This meet started in the academic year 1996-1997. Adds valor and sporting sprit to the men in campus as they vie for the championship and for the charm. The residents of this hall are known as Martinians.

=== Margaret Hall ===
This is a second hall established in 2009 for women students on campus. The hall has the capacity to house 140 students. Margaret Locher Anderson was the wife of founder, Rev. John Anderson, who laboured for the institution from 1845 to 1887. She was instrumental in starting the first on-campus women's hostel at her own home.

Margaret Hall has four blocks, each named after fragrant flowers- Freesia, Magnolia, Peonia, and Azalia. There are a total of 56 rooms which can accommodate around 150 residents.

The Hall Magazine, Saisei (Japanese for 'A New Beginning'), was introduced during the third year of the Hall by the then Literary and Debating Secretary, Ms Nikhila Sudharma Ajeer. The Hall Library was inaugurated by Pastor Charles during the third year of the Hall.

The hall conducts an inter-hall and inter-department theatre event called Dionysia. Hall residents refer to themselves as Margaritas.

=== Barnes Hall ===
This is the newest and the third women's hall established on 20 June 2016 by Mrs. Shanthi Manuel for women students on campus. The UGC, New Delhi, has sanctioned a grant of Rs.1.20 crores for the construction of a new Women's Hostel for the college. The hall was named after Mr. and Mrs. Barnes who were the first curators of the college. The first warden was E. Joyce Sudandara Priya.

The governing body or the cabinet is headed by the President (Hall Warden), The First Minister, The Deputy First Minister and 7 secretaries. The Hall is home to 95 members. The motto of the hall is Shine Agad Agothan which means "Shine Your Light" in Scottish Gaelic. The Hall Logo consists of a Cross symbolizing Christian foundation of the college, a Creeper symbolizing growth and prosperity, a Female face symbolizing women empowerment, a Flame symbolizing light, purity, and guidance, a Bible symbolizing knowledge and wisdom, a Pomegranate symbolizing unity. Barnes is the only hall with 24/7 water supply.

The residents refer to themselves as Barnesonites.

== Academics ==
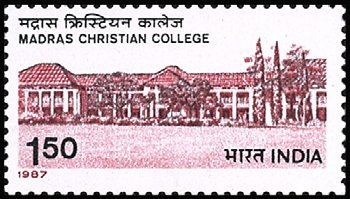
Madras Christian College on Indian Postage Stamp, 1987

=== Academic programmes ===
The college offers over 30 regular courses in undergraduate and postgraduate programmes in Arts, Sciences, and Commerce, besides undergraduate programmes in vocational streams of Archaeology and Musicology; and postgraduate programmes in Social Work (MSW) and Computer Applications (MCA). A number of departments at the college offers M. Phil and Ph.D. programmes.

MCC has 38 departments including day and evening streams, with over 8500 students. Half the student body are women and several faculty members are women teachers. The institution has about 294 faculty members, over half of whom are doctorate-holders.

The Department of Plant Biology and Plant Biotechnology supports students in practical applications through their Phycolab and Center for Floristics Research, in addition to the regular courses. Several new species and new varieties in flowering plants, fossils and algae have been described by the staff of the department. A fossil specimen Araucarioxylon giftii named after Gift Sironmoney, by D.E.P. Jeyasingh. A species of grass, Eragrostis Dayanandanii, was discovered and named after P. Dayanandan for his valuable contributions to botany, especially in the field of grasses. Two newly discovered plants of the Andaman and Nicobar Islands, Aidia livingstonii Karthig et al. and Liparis livingstonii Jayanthi et al. are named in honour of C. Livingstone for his contributions to plant taxonomy. A species of whitefly namely Aleurocanthus livingstonii is also named after Livingstone. Two new species Anoectochilus narasimhanii (orchid) and Orophea narasimhanii (custard apple) have been discovered by researchers of the department pursuing angiosperm taxonomy.

The Department of Biotechnology has funded a multi-institution project for species recovery. D. Narasimhan is the principal investigator for the DBT Species Recovery Project.

The Department of Political Science has notable professors like M. Abel and W. Lawrence S. Prabhakar.

==== Aided stream: Humanities ====
- Commerce
- Economics
- English
- History
- Archaeology (in vocational to history)
- Philosophy
- Political Science
- Public Administration(Only Masters)
- Social work(Only masters)
- Tamil

Languages

==== Aided stream: Science ====
- Chemistry
- Plant Biology & Plant Biotechnology
- Physics
- Mathematics
- Statistics
- Zoology

==== Self-financed stream: Humanities ====
- English Language and Literature
- Journalism
- Mass Communication
- Visual Communication
- Business Administration
- Commerce(General, Accounting and Finance, Retail Management & Information Technology)
- Bachelor of Social Work(BSW)
- Physical Education

Languages

==== Self-financed stream: Science ====
- Mathematics
- Physics
- Microbiology
- Computer Applications
- Geography, Tourism and Travel Management
- Psychology

=== Miller Memorial Library ===
An extensive library that was established in 1863, it is now housed in an elegant building that was designed in 1987 in anticipation of a visit by then Indian Prime Minister Rajiv Gandhi.

The library has several thousand books and periodicals in every course administered by the college and many others. A section of these books and journals are now being digitized for use by the students.

The library also has facilities dedicated to visually-challenged students with books in Braille, computers equipped with screen readers and the internet. Several volunteer students assist them in this exercise, particularly under the National Service Scheme (NSS) program and the Student Service for Differently Abled.

=== Affiliations ===
The college is associated with the MCCHSS in Chetput and three other schools in Tambaram: the Oxfam, RSL and the Campus School.

=== School of Continuing Education ===
On the assumption of autonomous status, the college geared itself up towards augmenting Human Resources for achieving innovative ventures and one such pioneering venture that was launched in 1983, was the Department of Continuing Education. With R. Rajkumar as its dynamic first director, the department emerged as the autonomous M.C.C. School of Continuing Education (MCCSCE) of the college. As an expression of its commitment to respond effectively to the plight of the less privileged youth, who, for various reasons, could not join the main stream of the college the MCCSCE through the years developed several Job and Career Oriented and Skill-Development Courses.

== Student life ==
=== Cultural festival ===
Madras Christian College has hosted DeepWoods, an inter-collegiate cultural festival, since 1980. It is typically held each year in February.

The three-day event sees participation by various colleges from Chennai and all over India with attendance touching almost 30,000. MCC, as the host college, does not participate in the festival.

The highlight of the second day of the event is a light music show, aimed at integrating youth of different ethnic backgrounds through multi-lingual music.

Rock show in progress

Anuratha Sriram, Malgudi Subha, Srinivasan, Unni Krishnan, Naresh Iyer, Anirudh Ravichander, Sid Sriram, Hiphop Tamizha, Shakthisree Gopalan and Gana Bala are among the many artists who have performed at the event.

The third and final day ends with a rock concert with the headlining act being among India's leading bands. Parikrama, Orange Street, Pentagram, Moksha, The Killer Tomatoes, Acquired Funk Syndrome, Them Clones, Thermal and a Quarter and Avial, are among the various acts that have performed at the festival.

=== Music ===
MCC is known for its tradition in choral and instrumental music in various genres. Notable musicians who have been MCC alumni include pianist and composer Handel Manuel and music director Samuel Joseph (commonly known as Shyam)

The Bishop Heber Chapel sustains a student choir in the Western tradition, who serve the weekly Sunday services as well as the daily prayers, evening services (compline), special services such as on Christmas, Good Friday, Easter Sunday as well as college-specific occasions. The college choir supports the daily morning worship services at Anderson Hall, as well as numerous other events at the college.

The college has also been known for its student rock bands over the decades which remain popular in Chennai while some have gained prominence nationally. Over the years, these bands have performed at competitions and events across the country and some continue to perform regularly. Notable bands started by or comprising MCC students include The Mustangs, Rusty Moe, and Blacklisted.

== Notable alumni ==
An alumnus of Madras Christian College is called an MCCian. MCCians have held distinguished positions in various fields, including the Indian Government, commerce, academia, journalism, sport, entertainment and the arts. Some of them are listed below:

=== Politics, government and services ===
- Sarvepalli Radhakrishnan, Second President of India
- M. M. Rajendran, Governor of Odisha 1999-2004
- T. R. A. Thumboo Chetty First Indian Chief Judge of the Chief Court of Mysore, Offg. Dewan of Mysore.
- R. K. Shanmukham Chetty, first Finance Minister of independent India
- John Mathai, former Finance Minister of India
- T. T. Krishnamachari, former Finance Minister of India
- T. N. Seshan, former Chief Election Commissioner of India
- R. V. S. Peri Sastri, former Chief Election Commissioner of India
- Kishore Chandra Deo, former Tribal Affairs and Panchayati Raj Minister of India
- R. Velu, former Minister of State for Railways of India
- M. Thambi Durai, Deputy Speaker of the Lok Sabha, former Law Minister of India and Minister for Surface Transport
- Krishnaswamy Sundarji, former Chief of Army Staff (1986–88)
- Bhogaraju Pattabhi Sitaramayya, former Governor of Madhya Pradesh, Member of Rajya Sabha, and Founder of Andhra Bank
- Nettur P. Damodaran, Member of 1st Lok Sabha from Tellicherry
- Prakash Karat, former General Secretary, Communist Party of India (Marxist)
- P. Subbarayan, 4th Chief Minister of erstwhile Madras Presidency
- B. Munuswamy Naidu, 5th Chief Minister of erstwhile Madras Presidency
- Kurma Venkata Reddy Naidu (Rao Bahadur), 10th Chief Minister of erstwhile Madras Presidency
- Mohammad Usman (Khan Bahadur Sir), Minister of Home for the erstwhile Madras Presidency
- P.P. Ummer Koya, second Education Minister of Kerala, freedom fighter, Gandhian
- Arcot Ramasamy Mudaliar (Diwan Bahadur), first President of the United Nations Economic and Social Council
- K. P. S. Menon, first Foreign Secretary of independent India, former Ambassador to the Soviet Union and China
- A. P. Venkateswaran, 14th Foreign Secretary of India, former Indian High Commissioner to Fiji, former Ambassador to Syria and China and Indian representative to the United Nations
- K. Raghunath, 20th Foreign Secretary of India, former Indian High Commissioner to Bangladesh, former Ambassador to Russia, Nigeria and The Philippines
- Sardar KM. Panikkar, Chairman of the States Reorganisation Commission, former Member of Rajya Sabha, former Ambassador to China and France and envoy to Egypt
- K. Vijay Kumar, former Officer in the Indian Police Service (IPS), Chief of Special Task Force that nabbed Veerappan during Operation Cocoon (2004)
- P. T. R. Palanivel Rajan, former Speaker of the Tamil Nadu Legislative Assembly
- C. Rajendran, Member of Parliament (Chennai South Constituency)
- T. K. M. Chinnayya, former Minister for Animal Husbandry, Government of Tamil Nadu
- M. Muhammad Ismail, Member of the Constituent Assembly of India, Indian politician belonging to the Indian Union Muslim League
- K. T. M. Ahmed Ibrahim, Member of the Constituent Assembly of India, Indian politician belonging to the Indian Union Muslim League
- Ruth Kattumuri, Senior Director for Economic, Youth and Sustainable Development, Commonwealth Secretariat
- Penpa Tsering, President of the Tibetan government in exile.
- Major Mukund Varadarajan Indian army officer got Ashoka Chakra the highest gallantry award for Indian soldiers after his patriotic army operation and his death.

=== Independence movement leaders ===
- S. Satyamurti, independence activist, politician and lawyer
- K.P.Kesava Menon, independence activist, lawyer and Member of the Indian Home Rule Movement
- E. Ikkanda Warrier, freedom fighter and the last prime minister of Cochin princely state.
- K. Kelappan, freedom fighter, journalist and Founder of the Nair Service Society
- M. C. Rajah, Dalit politician and contemporary of B. R. Ambedkar
- Konda Venkatappaiah, freedom fighter, lawyer and Founder of Krishna Patrika

=== Legal professionals ===
- Alladi Krishnaswamy Iyer, Member of the Constituent Assembly of India, Member of the drafting committee of the Indian Constitution, Advocate General of erstwhile Madras State (1929–44)
- P. V. Rajamannar, first Indian Chief Justice of the Madras High Court, acting Governor of erstwhile Madras State (1957–58)
- V. Balakrishna Eradi, former Supreme Court Judge, former Chief Justice of the Kerala High Court
- N. Santosh Hegde, former Solicitor General of India, former Supreme Court Judge
- Muhammad Shahabuddin, Governor of erstwhile East Bengal, former Chief Justice of the Dhaka High Court, served on the Indo-Pak Boundary Disputes Tribunal (1949–50)
- K.K. Venugopal, Attorney General of India

=== Business & Finance ===
- Indra Nooyi, Chairperson and CEO, PepsiCo
- K. M. Mammen Mappillai, Founder and former Chief Managing Director, MRF Ltd.
- Prathap C. Reddy, Founder, Apollo Hospitals and Padma Vibhushan awardee
- Gopal Vittal, Managing Director & CEO, Bharti Airtel
- Chandrika Tandon, Co-Founder and Chair, Tandon Capital Associates

=== Science ===
- Raja Ramanna, Indian physicist, Director of India's Nuclear Program, awarded the Padma Shri (1968), Padma Bhushan (1973) and Padma Vibhushan (1976)
- Kariamanickam Srinivasa Krishnan, Fellow of the Royal Society, co-discovered Raman Scattering, awarded the Padma Bhushan (1954) and the Bhatnagar Award (1958)
- George Sudarshan, Theoretical Physicist, awarded the Padma Bhushan (1976) and Padma Vibhushan (2007)
- P. T. Narasimhan, theoretical chemist, Shanti Swarup Bhatnagar laureate
- T. N. Ananthakrishnan, entomologist, Director, Zoological Survey of India
- T. V. Ramakrishna Ayyar, agricultural entomologist
- Muthusamy Lakshmanan, theoretical physicist, Shanti Swarup Bhatnagar laureate
- Bunyan Edmund Vijayam, geologist, Osmania University
- N. Gautham, DNA crystallographer and bioinformatician, professor emeritus at Centre of Advance Study in Crystallography and Biophysics, University of Madras
- C.Livingstone, botanist
- Sudi Devanesen, physician and educator

=== Humanities & Social Sciences ===
- K. N. Raj, economist
- Malcolm Adiseshiah, economist
- Raja Chelliah, economist
- Pulapre Balakrishnan, economist
- C.T. Kurien, economist
- C. Minakshi, historian
- K. A. Nilakanta Sastri, historian
- M. G. S. Narayanan, historian
- C. S. Lakshmi (Ambai), feminist writer and Sahitya Akademi awardee
- David Davidar, novelist and publisher
- S. Theodore Baskaran, film historian and wildlife conservationist
- Shreekumar Varma, author and playwright
- Nanduri Venkata Subba Rao, poet
- Srirangam Srinivasa Rao, poet and lyricist
- Vedam Venkataraya Sastry, poet and dramatist
- K. A. Jayaseelan, linguist and poet
- S. R. Ranganathan, father of Library Science, Information Science and Documentation in India
- Chittamuru Ramaiah, theosophist and translator
- Ravi Arvind Palat, political economist & sociologist
- Shiv Kunal Verma, Writer, Journalist & Military Historian

=== Vice-Chancellors ===
- A. Lakshmanaswami Mudaliar, Vice Chancellor of Madras University
- Maddela Abel, Sri Krishnadevaraya University
- Sonajharia Minz, vice-chancellor to the Sido Kanhu Murmu University
- Molly Easo Smith, President of the Manhattanville College, New York
- Siram Govindarajulu Naidu, founder vice chancellor of Sri Venkateswara University, Tirupati

=== Media & Performing Arts ===
- K. M. Mathew, chief editor, Malayala Manorama
- Sashi Kumar, founder, Asianet
- Gemini Ganesan, cinema actor
- Nassar, cinema actor, producer, director, lyricist, singer
- John Sankaramangalam, filmmaker and former director of FTII, Pune
- Ram, film director
- A.L.Vijay, film director
- Prathap Pothan, cinema actor and director
- Roshan Mathew, actor
- Handel Manuel, musician
- Benny Dayal, playback singer
- Arvind Venugopal, playback singer
- Samuel Joseph, music director
- Mervin Solomon, music director
- Rathna Kumar, film director

=== Theologians ===
- K. T. Paul
- P. Chenchiah
- Vengal Chakkarai
- Aiyadurai Jesudasen Appasamy
- Wesley Ariarajah
- V.C. Samuel
- Vedanayagam Samuel Azariah
- Archbishop Mar Ivanios
- David Chellappa
