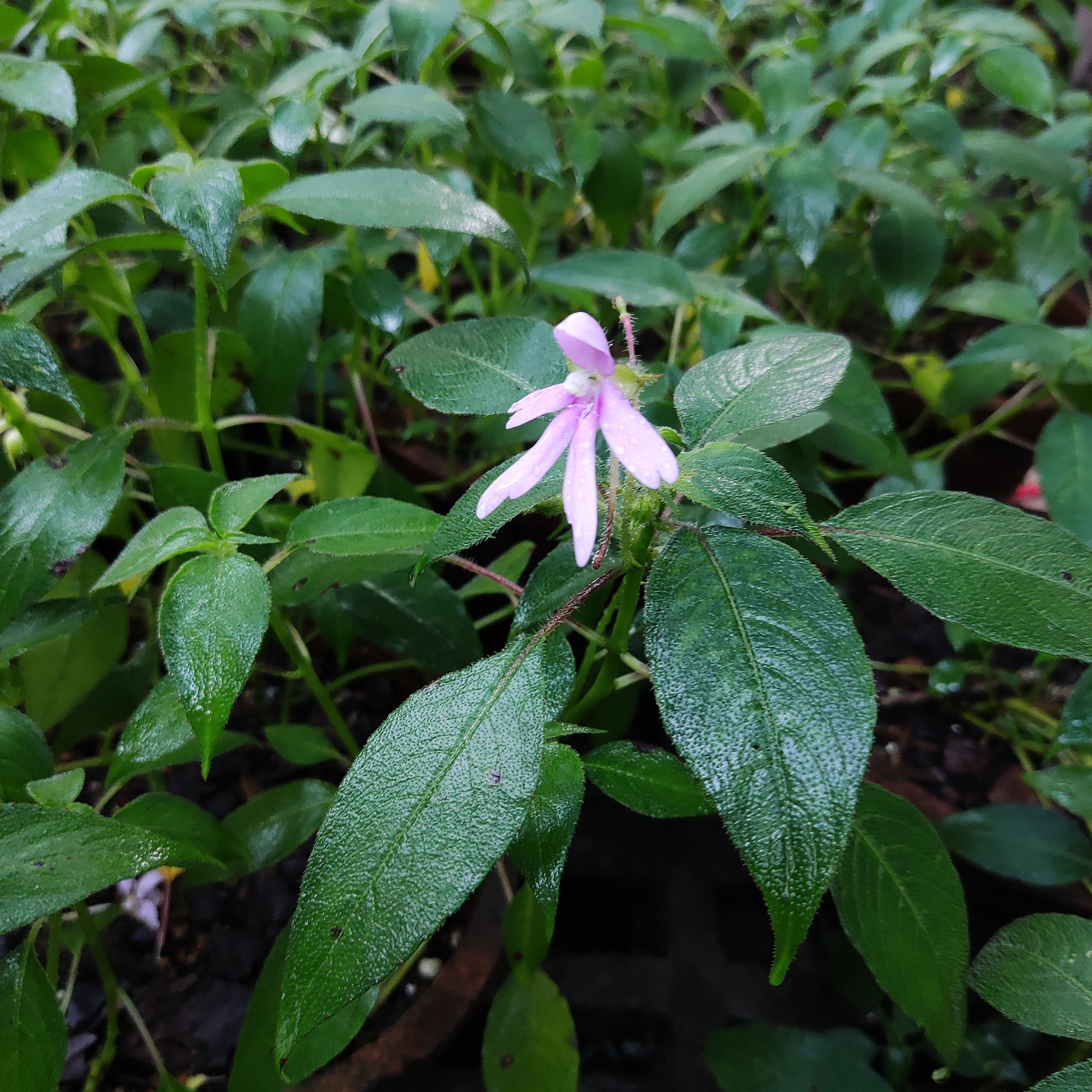

Scientific classification
- Kingdom: Plantae
- Clade: Tracheophytes
- Clade: Angiosperms
- Clade: Eudicots
- Clade: Asterids
- Order: Ericales
- Family: Balsaminaceae
- Genus: Impatiens
- Species: I. johnii

Binomial name
- Impatiens johnii E.Barnes

= Impatiens johnii =

Species of plant

Impatiens johnii is a species of balsam with a restricted distribution in the Munnar region of southern India. The species was first described by Edward Barnes in 1939 and it was not recorded in the wild again until 1999. The species has a restricted geographic distribution and is therefore considered endangered. It is known from the Pettimudy area and flowers from September to December.
