= C. Livingstone =

Indian research botanist (born 1949)

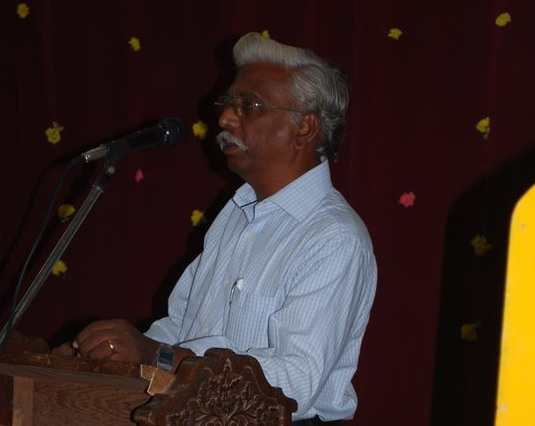
- Born: Chrispus Livingstone; 2 January 1949 (age 77); Palliyadi, Kanyakumari District, Tamil Nadu, India
- Education: Scott Christian College; Madras Christian College; University of Madras
- Occupations: Professor and Former H.O.D. Acting Principal; Director, MCC Farm
- Scientific career
- Fields: Plant Taxonomy
- Workplaces: Former chief Of St.Thomas's hall Madras Christian College
- Website: www.mcc.edu.in

Chrispus Livingstone (born 2 January 1949), often referred as Livi, is an Indian research scientist, botanist, educator and multifaceted person. He was instrumental in upgrading the department of Botany to one of the top three in India. During his stint the department witnessed significant innovative changes in the curriculum with the introduction of new papers and special projects (optionals) at various levels besides high quality research projects carried out by the senior professors and their research scholars leading to several accomplishments. He was also instrumental in setting up India's first artificial horticulture farm. Among his varied interests is the taxonomy of tropical plants, especially flora of Chennai, then Madras. He is perhaps best known for his book The flowering plants of Madras City and its immediate neighbourhood.

== Family ==
He was born to Chrispus Manikkam. He has two sons: Amithesh and Brijesh.

== Academic achievements ==
He was Head of Department of Botany at Madras Christian College (2003–2007). Livingstone was also course coordinator of Department of Microbiology (self-financed stream), MCC, Curator of MCC campus and president of Scrub Society. He was warden of St. Thomas’ hall. He remained Director to MCC farm. He is Treasurer of Centre for Plants, People and Ecosystems, a NGO working field based research on knowledge systems related to plants, people and ecosystems.

He showed keen interest in studying the plants of MCC campus from the time he joined the Botany Department and this resulted in the publication of Campus Flora in 1978. Under the district flora project of Botanical Survey of India, he investigated the flora of Chengalpattu District. His genuine interest in the study of flowering plants resulted in the publication of book on Flowering plants of Madras City and its immediate neighbourhood in 1994. He successfully guided 30 M. Phil. Scholars and 11 Ph.D. scholars. He has published number of articles both in national and international repute. He also published several books. Two newly discovered plants of the Andaman and Nicobar Islands, Aidia livingstonii Karthig et al. and Liparis livingstonii Jayanthi et al. are named in honour of Livingstone for his contributions to plant taxonomy. A species of whitefly namely Aleurocanthus livingstonii is also named after him. He is a life member of Indian Association for Angiosperm Taxonomy.

== Books ==
- The flowering plants of Madras City and its immediate neighbourhood / by P.V. Mayuranathan; revised by C. Livingstone and A.N. Henry.
- Campus flora of Madras Christian College/by Giles-Lal, D. and C. Livingstone. 1978. The Balussery Press. Madras. 78 p.
- Environmental Studies’ (in Tamil), A Resource Book for the Compulsory Course on Environmental Science as per UGC Syllabus / C. Livingstone. 2004. New Age International Publishers, New Delhi.
- Male Female Relationship / C.Livingstone (ed.), 1998. Bharati Mandram, Madras Christian College.

== Articles ==
Some of his significant articles are published in Kew Bulletin, Current Science, Rheedea, Journal of Nature Conservation, Zoos' Print Journal, Journal of Economic and Taxonomic Botany, Check List, etc.

Stephen, A., Anupama, K., Aravajy, S. and Livingstone, C. 2012. Leaf classes, foliar phenology and life forms of selected woody species from the tropical forests of central and southern Eastern Ghats, India. Check List, 8 (6): 1248-1266 (ISSN: 1809-127X) Leaf classes, foliar phenology and life forms of selected woody species from the tropical forests of central and southern Eastern Ghats, India.
