= J. N. Farquhar =

John Nicol Farquhar
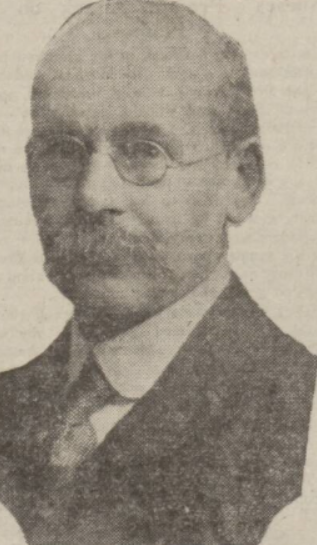
- Born: 6 April 1861; Aberdeen
- Died: 17 July 1929 (aged 68); Manchester
- Occupations: Educational missionary, Orientalist

John Nicol Farquhar (6 April 1861 – 17 July 1929) was a Scottish educational missionary to Calcutta, and an Orientalist. He is one of the pioneers who popularised the Fulfilment theology in India that Christ is the crown of Hinduism, though, Fulfilment thesis in Bengal was built on foundation originally laid in Madras by William Miller.

He authored several books on Hinduism, notably, The Crown of Hindustan, A Primer of Hinduism, Gita and Gospel, and many alike.

== Biography ==
Farquhar was born at Aberdeen in 1861. He was educated at Aberdeen Grammar School and Aberdeen University and served an apprenticeship as a draper, but he returned to school at an age of 21, and finished his studies at Oxford University. With no prior ordination, he was recruited by London Missionary Society as a lay educational missionary and sent to India in 1891.

He arrived at Calcutta and started his missionary work by teaching at Bhowanipur for eleven years from 1891. He joined Young Men's Christian Association (YMCA) in 1902 as a national student secretary; later, as a literary secretary, a post which he held until 1923. While working at YMCA, he strived to enable the association to widen its appeal to students through lectures, through personal friendships, and through production of whole new body of literature of the highest grade that India had ever known before.

Due to ill-health, he left India in 1923. He spent last six years of his life working as a professor of comparative religion in the University of Manchester. He died in Manchester in 1929.

== Bibliography ==
During his stint at YMCA, he wrote several books; notably, The Crown of Hinduism in 1913, A Primer of Hinduism in 1914, and Modern Religious Movements in India in 1915, and edited many more.

In his famous publication The Crown of Hinduism, he aspired to present Christ, rather than an organizational structure or intellectual system to India. He argued that Karma and Caste, traditional concepts enshrined in Hindu belief, are no longer essential in the construction of modern nation; instead, the message of Christ with high regard to freedom, progress, and civic virtue provides a better intellectual platform upon which to build a progressive India. He accepts that the Caste-system itself is a collective response to the pursuit of a structured and well-balanced society, still, he points at the caste-system for devoid of social justice and egalitarianism. However, he says a society that embraces the heart of Christ's message will inevitably develop social freedom for citizenry. According to Farquhar:

Christ and His message fulfills the quest for an ordered nation which gave rise to the institution of caste;the ethics of Christ completes this quest in a way that caste never could, since the system lacks the concept of social quality.

His work An Outline of the Religious Literature of India published in 1920, clearly demonstrates his excellent linguistic skills in both Bengali and Sanskrit languages.

As an editor for "Religious life of India," he inspired missionaries to write to the highest standards of accuracy, sympathy, and Christian-centric; however, he was less fortunate in finding the right Indian Christian co-workers, and never agreed fully to terms with the changed climate of opinion in India after 1919.

=== Publications ===
- The Apostle Thomas in South India (1927)
- The Apostle Thomas in North India. Bulletin of the John Rylands Library 10 (1926): 80–111.
- The Fighting Ascetics of India (1925)
- An Outline of the Religious Literature of India (1920)
- Modern Religious Movements in India (1915)
- A Primer of Hinduism (1914)
- The Crown of Hinduism (1913)
- The Approach of Christ to Modern India (1913)
- Gita and Gospel (1906)
- Permanent Lessons of the Gita (1903)

== Fulfilment Theology ==
According to O. Kandaswami Chetty, biographer of Dr. William Miller, for Miller "Christ was the friend of all that was good and true not only in Christianity, but in Hinduism." [sic]. The idea of "Christ the fulfiller" was made familiar to the minds of South Indians of Madras Presidency long before Farquhar's The Crown of Hinduism published in 1913. Even the colleagues of Miller like Bernard Lucas and T.E. Slater, author of The Higher Hinduism in Relation to Christianity published in 1909, long before articulated "Fulfilment theology" at the World Missionary Conference held at Edinburgh in 1910 itself—Edinburgh conference is considered as the starting point for modern theology of mission and also a launch-pad of the modern ecumenical movement.

According to Eric J. Sharpe, professor of Religious studies at University of Sydney; author of books like "Not To Destroy, But To Fulfil:the contribution of J.N. Farquhar to Protestant missionary thought in India before 1914", "John Nicol Farquhar and the missionary study of Hinduism", "John Nicol Farquhar, a memoir", and "Faith meets Faith: Some Christian Attitudes to Hinduism in the Nineteenth and Twentieth centuries"; and who extensively wrote on Farquhar's theology and missiological approach to Indian religions, has observed that Farquhar, although fully worked out "Fulfillment thesis" in his seminal work, yet his work on "Fulfillment theology" in Bengal was built on foundations laid out initially at Madras by William Miller itself.

He was the pioneer in popularising his missionary theology Fulfillment theology. Although, he didn't invent it by himself, but based his theology on William Miller Fulfilment theology that took its shape in Madras Presidency. According to this theology, "Christ came to fulfill and bring to completion not only the law and the prophets(Matt.5:17) but all the world's higher religions." [sic]—in this sense, Christ is the "Crown" of Hinduism.

He popularised and expressed the idea that Christianity was the fulfilment of other religions; he advocated that Christianity was not out to destroy other religions but to fulfill. He intended to develop a workable apologetic to maintain a satisfactory relationship between Christianity and Hinduism—during his days, there was a radical change in Indian Christian thoughts against Western Christianity, sense of nationalism and self-consciousness was growing among Indians, Hindu nationalism started reasserting its opposition to Christianity, Christian missionaries were considering non-Christian religions as evil, and Church union movement towards Christian unity was growing for Indianisation and indigenisation of Church in its administration, liturgy and theology. With "Fulfilment theology," he affirmed that Christianity or rather Christ, is the "Crown" of Hinduism. He hoped, progressive Hindus will embrace the Christianity; Christians, including Christian missionaries would be more sympathetic to other religions. With an intention of developing satisfactory relationship between Hinduism and Christianity, rather than of mere exclusion, he gradually worked out his idea of "I came not to destroy but to fulfill."(Mathew 5:17)

In his publication The Crown of Hinduism published in 1913, Farquher argued that:

If all religions are human, and yet men can in the long run hold only Christianity, clearly it must be, in some sense, the climax of the religious development in the world, the end and culmination of all religions. If all the great religious instincts, which have created the other faiths, find ultimate satisfaction in Christianity, then Christianity stands in a very definite relation to every other religion. It is the fulfilment and crown of each; and it is our privilege and duty to trace the lines of connection and lead the peoples up to the Christ.

Farquhar, though saw some amount of truth in non-Christian religions, yet he denounced some elements that Christianity cannot accept. Caste system is one among them, as he felt that equality, freedom, and justice are distinctive aspects of Christianity. According to Farquher, though, "Fulfilment" dictated sympathy and reverence as the only "way of wisdom" for the missionary to the Hindu, it indirectly spelt ultimate extinction for all non-Christian religions.

Eric Sharpe has remarked that Farquhar was "more than any other individual responsible for bringing about a decisive change in the thinking of Christians over against the phenomena of other faiths." [sic]

=== Criticism ===
A.G. Hogg, professor at Madras Christian College and author of Karma and Redemption in 1904, criticised Farquhar's "Fulfilment thesis" that says "Christianity fulfils all the noblest aspirations of the Hindus," [sic] as Hogg perceived that "in Hinduism there was searching and finding, and that a Christian was not offering what a Hindu was searching. Under certain circumstances, a Christian however could make the Hindu feel the need for what is available only in Christianity." [sic]

Farquhar's Fulfillment School has also been discussed, with praise and / or censor, by many writers on philosophy or theology of religion, including Gavin D'Costa, Jacques Dupuis, John Hick, David Marshall, Ivan Satyavrata, James Sharpe, and James Thrower: Satyavrata and Sharpe provide extended analyses. Farquhar is often taken as a leading representative of the Inclusivist School, though this would be more plausible if the focus were on ontology and ethics, which are Farquhar's foci, rather than on salvation.
