= Maddela (surname) =

Maddela (Telugu: మద్దెల) is a Telugu surname. Notable people with the surname include:

- Maddela Abel (1923–2012), Indian political scientist
- Maddela Nagaraja Kumari (1921–2008), Indian actress known professionally as Kumari
