= Anderson Church, Chennai =

Anderson Church
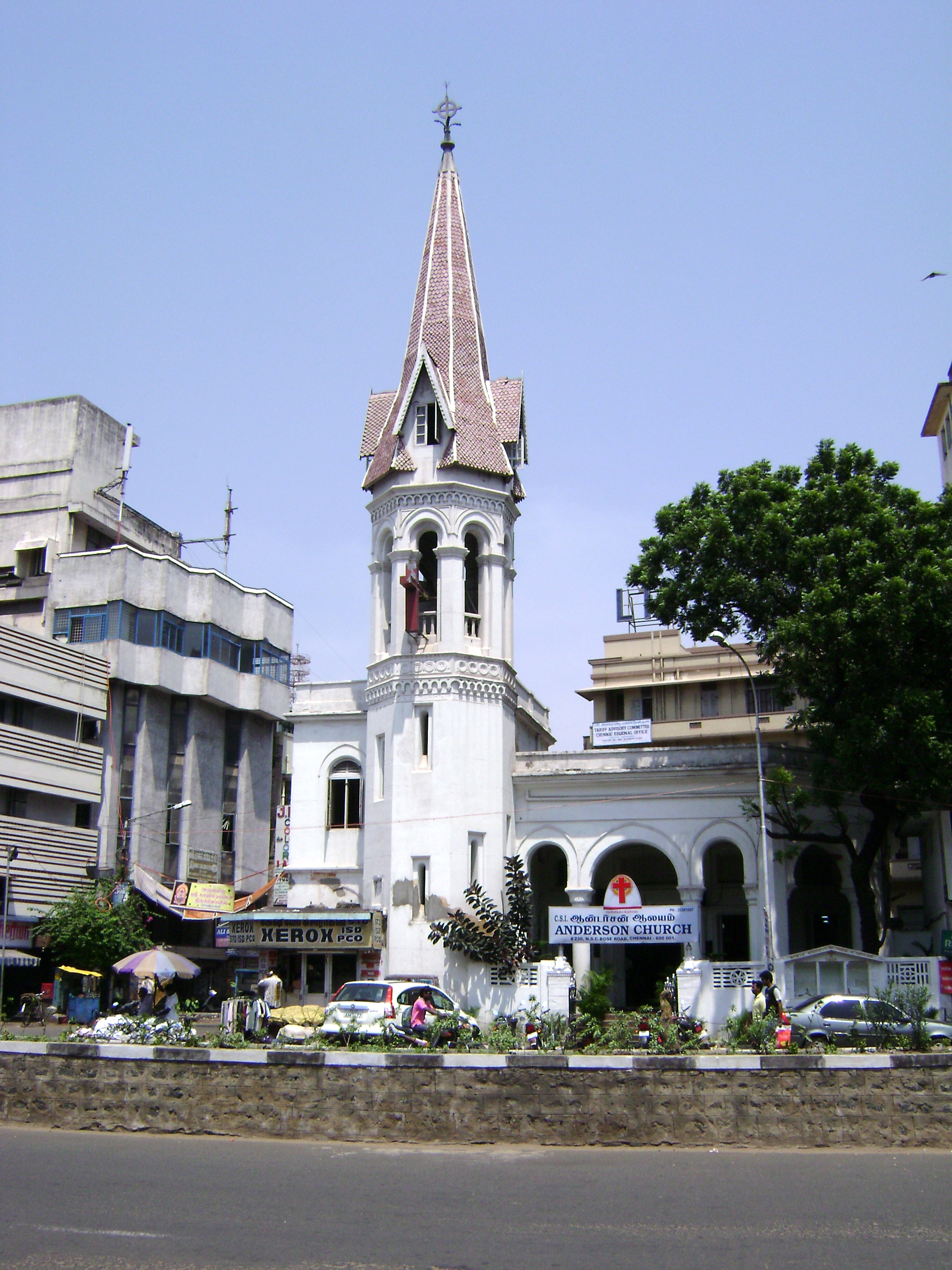
- Front view of the church

- Location within Tamil Nadu
- 13°05′19″N 80°17′18″E
- Location: Parry's Corner, Chennai
- Country: India
- Denomination: Protestant

History
- Dedication: 1845

Architecture
- Functional status: Active
- Architectural type: Chapel

Administration
- Archdiocese: Diocese of Madras of the Church of South India

Anderson Church is one of the oldest churches in Parry's Corner area of Chennai, the capital of the South Indian state of Tamil Nadu. The original structure was built in 1845 by Anderson as an educational institution. The church is named after Anderson, a Scottish missionary who founded the mission of the Free Church of Scotland at Madras, India.

Anderson Church is a working church with hourly prayer and daily services and follows Protestant sect of Christianity. The church also celebrates Harvest festival every year during the month of November. In modern times, it is under the dominion of Diocese of Madras of the Church of South India. It is one of the most prominent landmarks of Parry's Corner.

== Architecture ==
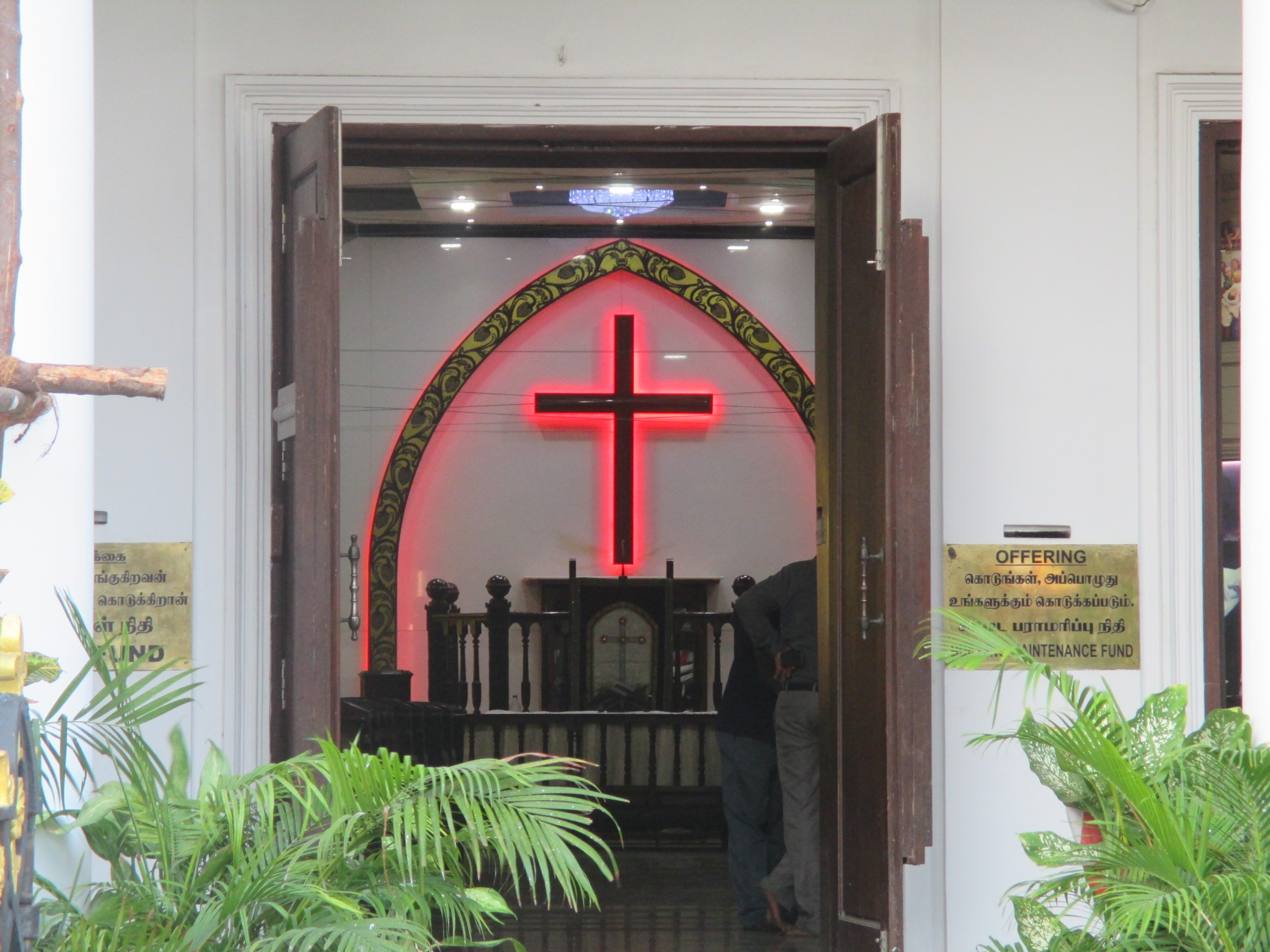
Sanctum of the church

The church has an exterior with brick walls, stained glass windows and Chisholm styled dome. The altar houses conventional Methodist images and a prayer hall for the devotees. The plaques of Anderson and Jesus Christ are housed in glass chambers in standing posture on the walls facing the devotees. The college hall, which would go on to become the assembly hall of the church, is plastered with shingles. The church is declared a landmark heritage building by the Tamil Nadu Chapter of Indian National Trust for Art and Cultural Heritage (INTACH). It was also on the Phase I list of Heritage buildings in Chennai under the Chennai Metropolitan Development Authority (CMDA).

== History ==
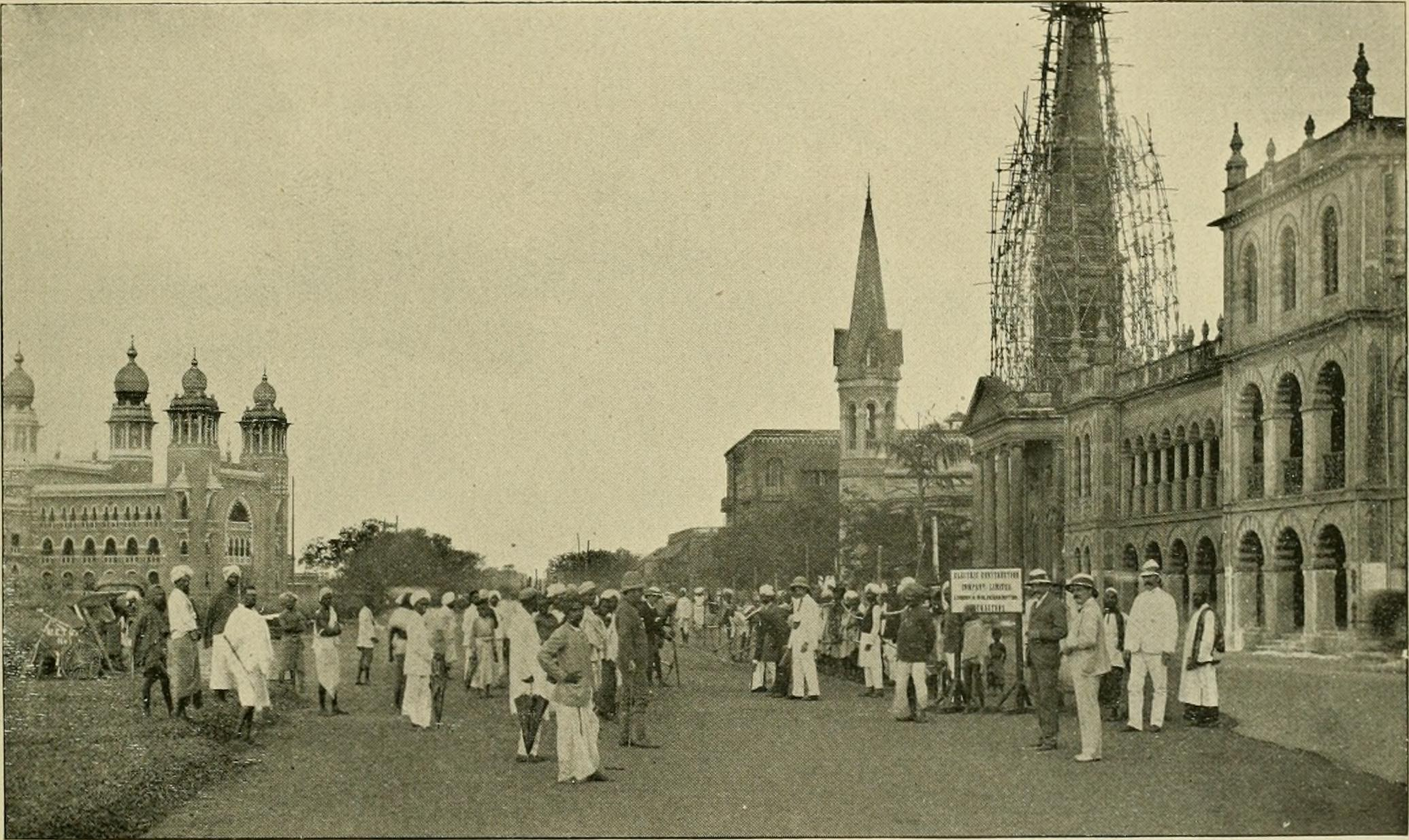
Image of the old view of the Esplanade Road (NSC Bose Road), with the Church seen on the right

The church was named after John Anderson (1805–1855), a Scottish missionary who founded the mission of the Free Church of Scotland at Madras, India. He is believed to have established an educational institution in the name of General Assembly School in 1835 at Egmore. It was moved to George Town area in Chennai by 1838 and later went on to become the Free Church of Scotland's central shrine in Chennai in 1845. The Madras Christian College was started at this campus in 1867, initially as a school and later became a college in 1876. The college was later moved to Tambaram in 1937 and only the Church operates from the campus. The chapel was originally called College Chapel, but later came to be known as Anderson Church, after the death of Anderson.

== Worship practises ==
The priests in the church were originally only English, but during modern times, Tamil people were also allowed. In modern times, the Church is administered by the Diocese of Madras of the Church of South India. Service is performed in the church from Monday to Friday on 8 a.m., 8:30 a.m. and 5 p.m. on Saturdays and 8:30 a.m. and 6 p.m. on Sundays. The festival of the temple is celebrated during the Christmas times for eight days, starting with flag hoisting on 24 December and ending with a feast and religious lectures on 2 January. The 150th anniversary of the church was celebrated on 3 March 2009 when special prayers and lectures were delivered.

== See also ==
- List of churches in Chennai
- Heritage structures in Chennai
