= C. Minakshi =

Indian historian

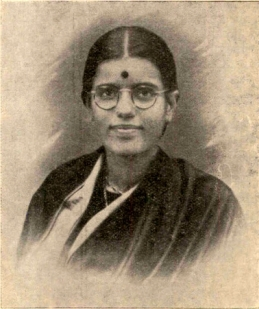

Cadambi Minakshi (12 September 1905 – 3 March 1940) was an Indian historian and expert on Pallava history. In 1936, she became the first woman to get a doctorate from the University of Madras.

== Biography ==
Minakshi was born in Madras on 12 September 1905 to Cadambi Balakrishnan, a bench clerk in the Madras High Court and his wife, Mangalammal. Balakrishnan died when Minakshi was young and Mangalammal took care of the family. Minakshi was interested in history from an early age and visited historic sites as Mannargudi, Pudukkottai, Villuppuram and Kanchipuram.

On completion of her schooling, Minakshi joined the Women's Christian College in Madras, graduating in 1929. She wanted to get her master's degree at Madras Christian College but her candidature was initially rejected on grounds of being a woman. However, Minakshi persisted and the authorities relented when her eldest C. Lakshminarayanan, a professor in the college gave a written undertaking to take care of her. Minakshi eventually completed her master's degree and went on to pursue her doctorate obtaining it in 1936, becoming the first woman to receive a doctorate from the University of Madras. Her doctoral thesis on "Administration and Social life under the Pallavas" was published in 1938 by the University of Madras as a part of a history series by eminent historian K. A. Nilakanta Sastri. The Madras daily The Hindu describes the book as "the eminently successful piece of research and is one of the best of a valuable series".

Meenakshi, who was also a Carnatic musician, had performed in several concerts.

== Career and research ==
Soon after obtaining her doctorate in 1936, Minakshi started looking for a job. She was, initially turned down by the All India Radio and other organizations she applied for. Finally, in 1939, Sir Mirza Ismail, the Diwan of the Mysore kingdom offered her a job as assistant professor at the Maharani College in Bangalore.

In 1939, at the request of the Archaeological Survey of India, Minakshi studied the sculptures of the Vaikuntha Perumal temple in Kanchipuram and published a book that is still considered the authoritative text on Pallava art. She also worked on history of Buddhism and Jainism in Tamil Nadu and made many noted discoveries.

== Death ==
Minakshi fell ill a few months after moving to Bangalore and died on 3 March 1940 at the age of 34. Condoling her death, the historian K. A. Nilakanta Sastri wrote to her mother in July 1941:

It is cruel she died young. Whenever I think about it, pain engulfs me

== Works ==
- C. Minakshi (1938). Administration and social life under the Pallavas. University of Madras.
- C. Minakshi (1940). Kañchi: an introduction to its architecture. Ministry of Information and Broadcasting, Government of India.
- C. Minakshi (1941). The historical sculptures of the vaikuṇṭhaperumāḷ temple, Kāñchī. Archaeological Survey of India.
