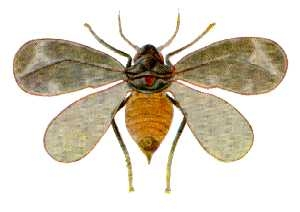

Scientific classification
- Kingdom: Animalia
- Phylum: Arthropoda
- Class: Insecta
- Order: Hemiptera
- Suborder: Sternorrhyncha
- Family: Aleyrodidae
- Genus: Aleurocanthus
- Species: A. spiniferus

Binomial name
- Aleurocanthus spiniferus (Quaintance, 1903)

= Aleurocanthus spiniferus =

Species of true bug

Aleurocanthus spiniferus, the citrus spiny whitefly, is an insect native to Asia. It is considered an invasive pest, notably affecting citrus and tea plants. They are part of the whitefly family.

A. spiniferus is indigenous to parts of tropical Asia, where it was first discovered in Japan c. 1903, soon after which it spread around the world. Wherever it is found, it has become a highly destructive pest. Two populations of A. spiniferus are known: the citrus spiny whitefly, as well as the tea spiny whitefly, named for the kind of plant they infest.

== Description ==
Adult whiteflies typically lay their eggs in groups on plants (e.g. citrus), usually on a leaf. Eggs give rise to crawlers (their first instar, or developmental stage). These go through two sessile nymphal instars, becoming pupa (their fourth instar, when they closely resemble related whiteflies), then finally adults.

The initiation and duration of the life cycle, as well as the number of generations per year is highly dependent on the surrounding climate. A mild temperature along with high humidity provides an ideal environment for successful growth and development. Kuwana et al. (1927) were able to record about 4 generations per year, with as many as 7 generations under the best laboratory conditions. (This study demonstrated the variability of life-cycle duration.)

Varieties have been shown to be exclusive in terms of the plants they lay eggs on. The females of the tea-infesting variety only lay eggs on tea plants, not citrus.

== Distribution and habitat ==
The citrus spiny whitefly is indigenous to parts of tropical Asia, including Japan where it was first discovered (c. 1903). In the 1920s, Japan conducted a biological control program to control the pest. It had spread to Jamaica by 1922, and ultimately reached various Pacific Islands (Guam in 1951; Oahu in 1974) as well as multiple continents including Europe (in Italy and Greece), Africa, Australia, and the Americas.

A. spiniferus can be observed on not only citrus but also on rose, grape, peach, pear, and guava plants, all of which were observed with the fly in Guam in 1951.

== Ecology ==
A. spiniferus directly damage trees via the ingestion of their sap. Infested plants suffer indirect damage from the flies' excretion of honeydew on their leaf surfaces, which promotes the development of sooty mold on the leaves, branches, and fruit. This interferes with the plant's health, including its ability to conduct photosynthesis.

=== Management ===
Many whitefly species have become serious pests, especially when first introduced to new geographical regions, where they typically outcompete other pests. This is amplified in the absence of natural enemies, e.g. its parasitoid wasp, E. smithi, the introduction of which has been successfully employed as a form of biological pest control in response to A. spiniferus outbreaks. The wasp method was aided by their ability to migrate and adapt to new environments, as well as populate those new areas.

Colour preference is another method researchers use to monitor population dynamics, or for this instance, to control insect numbers in crop protection. Whiteflies have been shown to prefer the colour yellow, therefore methods using this information have been used to create a sticky trap that can aid in controlling these outbreaks.

Overall, chemical controls have been attempted in response to the outbreaks such as spraying pesticides, which can be considered effective but not without detriment. The presumptively high concentrations of pesticides can result in insecticide resistance, and toxic pesticides could be consumed by humans, e.g. via the drinking of contaminated tea.
