= William Miller (missionary) =

Christian missionary and educator in India

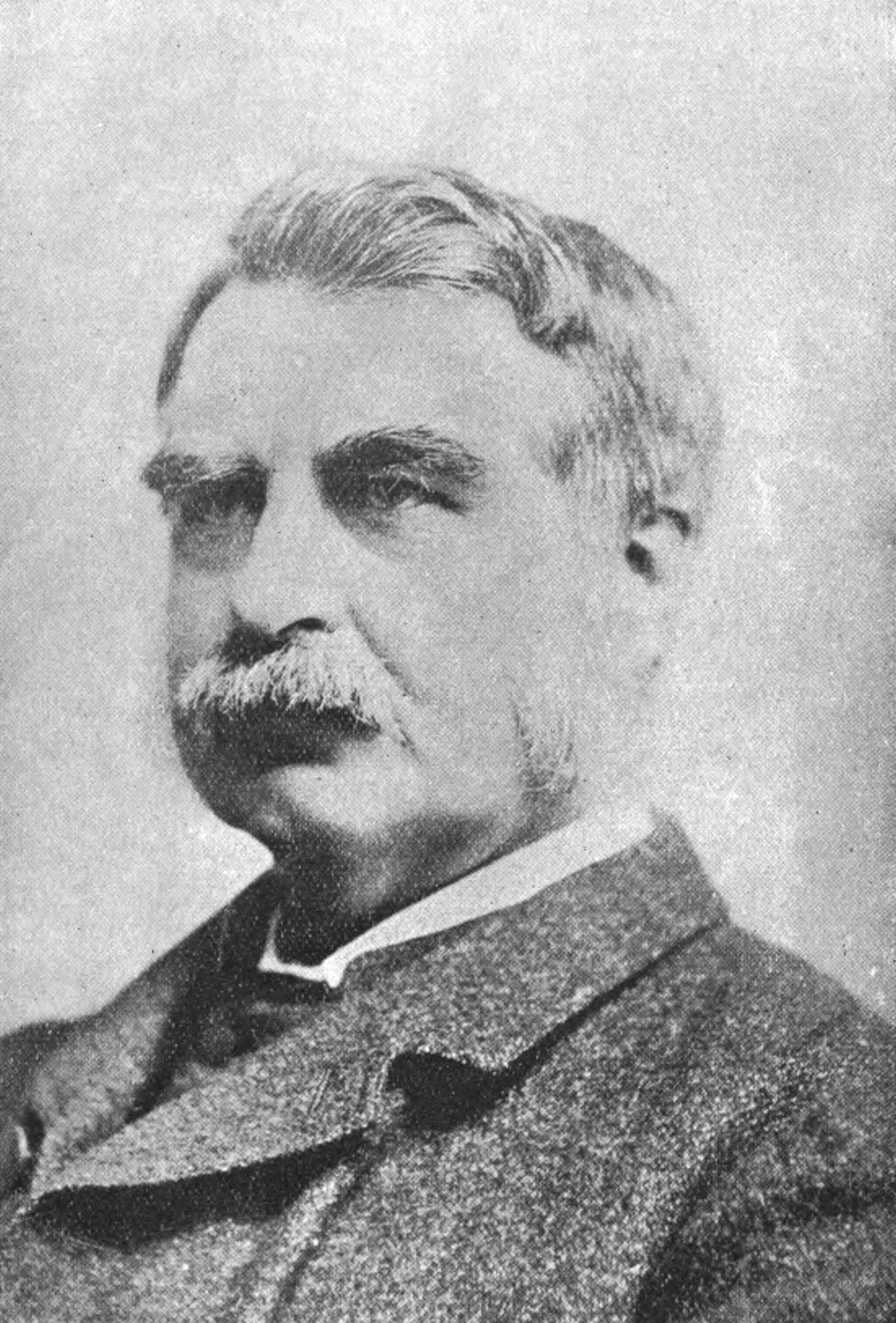
- William Miller from Shakespeare Omnibus

Personal details
- Born: 13 January 1838
- Died: 15 July 1923 (aged 85)

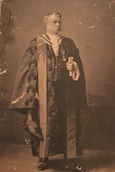

William Miller CIE (13 January 1838 – 15 July 1923) was a Scottish educationalist and Free Church of Scotland missionary to Madras. He was also a member of Madras Legislative Council for four terms—in 1893, 1895, 1899, and 1902.

He was chiefly notable for transforming Madras Christian College into an ecumenical enterprise and imbuing the minds of Madras Province South Indians with Fulfilment theology, with an idea of "Christ the fulfiller"—in a sense, he is considered not only the pioneer of Fulfilment theology, but also of Hindu Renaissance by making Indian converts to think Christianity in Indian context. He was the recipient of Kaiser-i-Hind Medal and the first LL.D, honoured by the Madras University.

== Biography ==
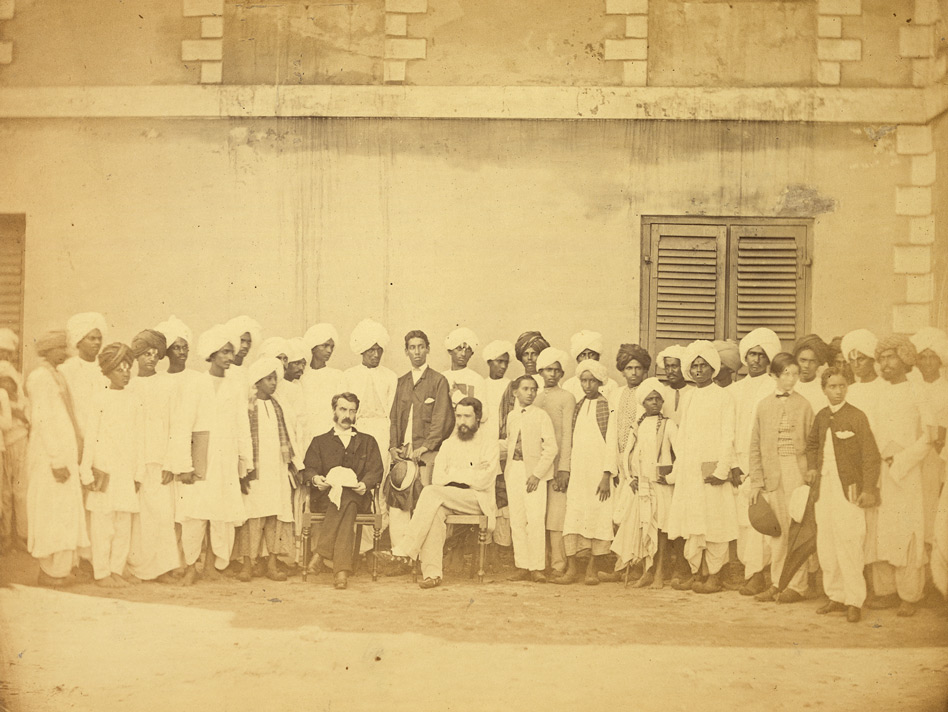
Group portrait of Free Church of Scotland mission in Tamil Nadu

Miller was born in Thurso on 13 January 1838, and was educated at Aberdeen University and Edinburgh University.

He arrived Madras in 1862 at the age of twenty-four, as the only missionary of the Free Church of Scotland in Madras city at the time of his arrival. Initially, as a missionary, he was engaged in outdoor preaching, congregational work, medical aid, and the education of boys and girls.

Madras Christian College received vitality with the arrival of Miller in 1862, and soon became the greatest architect of the college. In 1863, he envisioned that only Christian education could train the greatest leaders of India, he began to specialise on the institution that later renamed the Central Institution, as the Madras Christian College on 1 January 1877. —A Christian school[General Assembly School] founded on 3 April 1837 by John Anderson, Scottish missionary and the founder of the mission of the Free Church of Scotland at Madras, later became known as Madras Christian College that grew from the school into a college and then Campus under the leadership of William Miller. After he took over the college succeeding Anderson, within two years of his arrival, he upgraded the school into a college and reoriented the educational policy of the institution. The first college class was formed in 1864, studying for the First examination in Arts(FA) of the university. By 1865, the first class of six students appeared for matriculation examination. And, by 1867, a new class was opened to prepare for the BA courses. Miller procured the support of leading missions, including Anglican, Wesleyan, and Presbyterian bodies that ultimately turned a small sectarian institution into a mammoth and a central Christian college for all South India, and soon to be in the front rank of all institutions in India. Miller transformed the institution into an ecumenical and co-operative enterprise and named it as Madras Christian College on 1 January 1877.

He not only erected great buildings for the college, chiefly by his own gifts and those of his brother Alexander Miller, but also garnered support and sponsorship from a group of loyal and able men, both Indian and British. His college hostels were first of their kind in South India—he used these to train future government officials and members of municipal and local boards in the art of conducting public business and running democracy. The alumni of the college, occupied prominent positions in all fields, including national movements, politics and government offices.

Miller is credited for opening hostels, several academic and cultural associations, that ultimately shaped Madras Christian College into a premier educational institution in South Asia. He later opened up the institution for Hindu students to a Christward direction through education, rather than just conversion of their faith – Vengal Chakkarai Chetty, P. Chenchiah, and many more were in fact attracted to Christianity under the influence of Miller.

He served as the active principal of Madras Christian College for 45 years, another 16 years as Honorary principal, and helped the government shape its educational policy as an educator in all over India. He worked as an educator in India until 1896, and also served as a leading member of Madras University syndicate. For his educational work, he won the appreciation and financial aid from the government.

He was nominated to Madras Legislative Council (1891–1909) consecutively four times in 1893, 1895, 1899, and 1902. In 1896, he was unanimously chosen the moderator of the General Assembly of the Free Church of Scotland, the highest honour accorded in the church. He received Kaiser-i-Hind Medal and several honorary degrees were conferred by the universities of Aberdeen and Edinburgh.

He was appointed as Vice-chancellor of the University of Madras in 1901. In 1907, due to ill-health, he left India to reside in Edinburgh, Scotland, and died there 15 July 1923 at the age of eighty-five. He was laid to rest in the cemetery in Thurso, his birthplace.

A biography on William Miller entitled Dr. William Miller was written and published by O.Kandaswami Chetty in 1924, which was earlier published in the Madras Christian College Magazine in 1923. (see Joshua Kalapati and Ambrose Jeyasekaran, Life and Legacy of Madras Christian College, Chennai, 2010)

== Works ==
- Scottish Missions in India, 1868.
- Indian Mission and How to View Them, 1878.
- Lectures for Educated Hindus, 1880.
- The Christian College for Madras, a printed memorandum to the Free Church Foreign Mission Committee (FCFMC), 1874.
- Our Scandinavian Forefathers
- The Least of All Lands: The Topography of Palestine
- Gideon
- The Plan of History
- Christianity and Education in South India
- Shakespeare's Coriolanus and Present Day Indian Politics

== Theology ==
Miller argued that the Hinduism could not be excluded from the plans of God, and believed that Christianity and Hinduism could work in concentric circles to fulfill the master plans of God. Miller, who is considered as the pioneer of Fulfillment theology, in his Scottish Missions in India published in 1868 noted that:

Hinduism is emphatically a system, a mighty mass, a living unity and power, not only embracing, but wielding into one, the unnumbered millions by whom it is professed, as no other faith in the world does now, or probably has ever done. It is this feature in it that has chiefly determined the nature of our Missions. It must largely effect everything that can be wisely done for the liberation and enlightenment of India.

Miller asserted that the institutional and historic Christianity is not superior to Hinduism; instead, it is Christ who is the fulfiller of Hinduism. According to him, though, Christ and His teachings were ultimately central, he felt that enriching truths can be found in Hinduism which would contribute to the common good of humanity and to the Church of Christ. He affirmed that Christianity has no monopoly on truth as Hinduism's emphasis on the immanence of God and on social solidarity has much to teach humanity;other religions could make contributions to the completeness of Christianity, while Christ can fulfill the aspirations of the followers of other religions.

Miller felt that educational institutes in India could not be used as places for conversion; instead, as avenues for preparing the Hindus in a Christian direction – Preparatio evangelica. According to him, Christian missions are like leaven, though, not seen from outside, yet is innately transforming. According to O. Kandaswami Chetty, biographer of Dr. William Miller, for Miller "Christ was the friend of all that was good and true not only in Christianity, but in Hinduism." [sic] The idea of Christ the fulfiller imbued the minds of South India, part of then-Madras Presidency, due to the teachings of Miller at Madras Christian College and due to his missionary work in Madras. According to Eric J. Sharpe, professor of Religious Studies at the University of Sydney, J. N. Farquhar's work on Fulfillment theology in Bengal was built on foundations originally laid in Madras.

Though, the object of missionary work and missionary colleges like Madras Christian College was to preach Christ and train Christians, Miller encouraged the Indian converts to rethink Christianity in Indian context, possibly to integrate Christianity and Hinduism; hence, was considered the pioneer of Hindu Renaissance. He discouraged proselytism, encouraged the retention of national manners, and advocated the habit of independent thinking.

== Honours ==
- The library building in Madras Christian College is named after him as The Miller Memorial Library.
- Kaisar-i-Hind Medal
- Companion of the Order of the Indian Empire (1884)
- A bronze statue during his lifetime was erected in Madras.
- The Miller Endowment Lectures were established at the University of Madras in 1926 by Diwan Bahadur Sir R. Venkataratnam Naidu, Vice Chancellor of the University, in Miller's honor. Many major figures in philosophy from India and abroad have been invited to deliver them. Among the Indian scholars invited to give the lectures are: S. Radhakrishnan, T.M.P. Mahadevan (1953), S.S. Suryanarayana Sastri (1936–37), V.A. Devasenapathi (1962), P.N. Srinivasachari (of Pachaiyappa’s College) (1940) and C.T.K. Chari (of Madras Christian College), from Madras; S.S. Raghavachar (1965) and M. [Mysore] Hiriyanna (1940-1) from Mysore; and R.K. Tripathi (1977) from Banares Hindu University. Foreign scholars, such as Fernand Brunner (University of Neuchâtel, Switzerland), William Sweet (St. Francis Xavier University, Canada), and Klaus Klostermaier (University of Manitoba, Canada), have also given the lectures.

== See also ==
- Miller Memorial Library at Madras Christian College

Joshua Kalapati and Ambrose Jeyasekaran, Life and Legacy of Madras Christian College (1837-1978), Chennai: Zha Communications, 2010

== See also ==
- Works by or about William Miller at the Internet Archive
