= Chittamuru Ramaiah =

Chittamuru Ramaiya
- Born: 1867; India
- Died: 18 January 1931 (aged 63–64)
- Occupations: author, philosopher
- Parent(s): Sriramulu and Meenakshamma Chittamuru

Chittamuru Ramaiya (Telugu: చిట్టమూరు రామయ్య) was a 19th and 20th century Theosophist and translator, and an associate of Annie Besant.

== Early and personal life ==
The son of Chittamuru Sriramulu, he had five brothers: Chittamuru Subbaramaiah, Chittamuru Krishnaiah, Chittamuru Subbarayudu, Chittamuru Lakshmaiah and Chittamuru Ramachandraiah. He completed a degree in Bachelor of Arts in Literature in the 19th century. He was associated with Annie Besant for some time at the Theosophical Society, Adyar, Madras, India.

Chittamuru Ramaiah had one son, named Chittamuru Sreeramulu.

== Books ==
He wrote many books on theosophy, including one titled Divya jnana saaramu, meaning "The Essence of Theosophy"; a second edition of this title was published by C.Subbarayudu, Manager, Vasantha Institute, Madras, in 1937. The book included one chapter, "Adrushya sahayulu", from a book titled Divya jnana deepika by his brother Subbaramaiah. He published another book, Brahma vidya darpanamu ("Hinduism in Light of Theosophy"), in 1941; he dedicated it to Annie Besant. He was also known for having translated the book At the Feet of the Master, attributed to Jiddu Krishnamurti, into Telugu.
