= Eric J. Sharpe =

Australian Professor of Religious Studies (1933–2000)

Eric John Sharpe (19 September 1933 – 19 October 2000) was the founding Professor of Religious Studies at the University of Sydney, Australia. He was a major scholar in the phenomenology of religion, the history of modern Christian mission, and inter-religious dialogue.

== Early life and education ==
Sharpe was born in a working-class family in Lancaster, England. Aged 11, he won a scholarship as a non-boarding student at the Royal Lancaster Grammar School. His favourite sports were rowing and long-distance cycling. It was in his late teens, through a school friend, that he was brought into contact with Christianity at a local Methodist church. After doing National Service in the British Education Corps – this was at the time of the Korean War – he presented himself as a student at the Hartley Victoria College in Manchester, as a candidate for the Methodist ministry. Later, however, he chose the path of scholarship and so was not ordained. At the University of Manchester he achieved a B.A. (Theol.) and an M.A. degree in the History of Religions, studying under Professor S. G. F. Brandon. In 1958 he went to Sweden, where seven years later he received his doctorate in theology (Teol. Dr) in Church History with Missiology from the University of Uppsala, Sweden. He married Birgitta Johannesson in 1962. After a one-year visiting appointment at a liberal arts college in Indiana, USA, he joined Prof. Brandon at the University of Manchester, England, in 1966 and then Prof. Ninian Smart at the University of Lancaster in 1970. He collaborated with Ninian Smart in promoting religious studies as a subject in British schools. He also spent time in field and archival research in India, and in 1977 became the inaugural Professor of Religious Studies at the University of Sydney (1977–1996).

== Career ==
Sharpe wrote the first historical survey of the rise of comparative religion as an academic discipline, assessing the contributions of Nineteenth century philologists, folklorists, anthropologists, and psychologists of religion, and charted the emergence of religious studies and the history of religions in Twentieth century scholarship.

He was also a strong contributor to discussions concerning methodology in the study of religion, and on issues of dialogue and faith.

He was a specialist in the history of modern-day Christian missions to India and wrote biographical studies on influential missionary-scholars such as A.G. Hogg and John Nicol Farquhar. He chronicled the historical encounter between Hinduism and Christianity from the Nineteenth century onwards. He also analysed the life and career of Karl Ludvig Reichelt, the founder of the Tao Fong Shan Christian Center in Hong Kong and a prominent missionary figure with Chinese Buddhists. He composed a major study of the life and intellectual thought of the Swedish Lutheran Bishop, ecumenical theologian and scholar of comparative religion Nathan Soderblom. In all of these studies Sharpe brought to bear an incisive sense of history, and also sought to illuminate the critical issues of inter-religious dialogue.

In 1985 he had published a bicentennial survey of all major English-language translations of the Indian sacred text the Bhagavad Gita. In this work he demonstrated how romantic interpretations of the Gita developed in the western world, and charted how Christian missionaries to India often misunderstood the text.

Sharpe was also an expert on new religious movements and wrote a number of periodical essays pertaining to the controversies surrounding these groups. He was also an accomplished linguist and translated into the English language books by Swedish scholars such as Bertil Gärtner and Birger Gerhardsson.

According to John Roxborogh, Sharpe was a model scholar whose work was marked by " clarity and precision in writing, a joyous curiosity, an ability to be fair, a religious sensibility and a capacity for surprise."

His final book, which was released posthumously, was a biographical study of a famous Indian Christian, Sadhu Sundar Singh. Sharpe's study highlighted how Western intellectuals and clergy constructed romanticised portraits of Singh as an ideal figure. Many of the previous biographies of Singh have presented him as a zealous evangelical Christian who died in mysterious circumstances in Tibet. Those in the Liberal Christian churches have described Singh as an ideal Christian mystic. Sharpe's analysis exposed the symbols and myths surrounding Singh's life and ministry constructed by certain evangelical and liberal writers. Among the chronological and contradictory elements Sharpe investigated was the curious relationship Singh had with the followers of Emanuel Swedenborg.

Sharpe was for many years an influential figure in the International Association for the History of Religions, hosting its international congresses in Lancaster 1975 and Sydney 1985. He was honoured with a life membership of the IAHR in 1995. He was President of The Australian Association for the Study of Religions and a Fellow of the Australian Academy of the Humanities.

He guest lectured at Harvard University and at the University of Uppsala, Sweden, where from 1978 to 1981 he held the chair as full Professor of History of Religion. He held visiting appointments at Northwestern University, Evanston, Illinois; and at two Canadian universities, MacMaster in Hamilton, Ontario and the University of Manitoba in Winnipeg. In 1991 he was Senior Mission Scholar in Residence, Overseas Ministries Study Center, New Haven, Connecticut.

Eric Sharpe was honoured with two separate volumes of essays by his peers.

== Biographical sources ==
- Arvind Sharma, ed., The Sum of Our Choices: Essays in Honour of Eric John Sharpe (Atlanta: Scholars Press, 1996). ISBN 0-7885-0313-8
- Carole M. Cusack and Peter Oldmeadow, eds., This Immense Panorama: Studies in Honour of Eric John Sharpe (Sydney: School of Studies in Religion University of Sydney, 1999). ISBN 1-86487-061-3
- Garry Trompf, "Eulogy: Eric John Sharpe," Australian Religion Studies Review, 14/1 (2001), pp. 128–131.

== Bibliography ==
- Comparative Religion: a history, 2nd ed., (London: Duckworth, 1986/La Salle: Open Court, 1986). US ISBN 0-8126-9041-9
- Not To Destroy, But To Fulfil (Lund, Sweden: Gleerup, 1965).
- 50 Key Words: Comparative Religion (Richmond: John Knox Press, 1971). ISBN 0-8042-3897-9
- The Theology of A. G. Hogg (Madras: Christian Literature Society, 1971).
- Thinking About Hinduism (Guildford and London: Lutterworth Educational, 1971). ISBN 0-7188-1822-9
- Hinduism (co-edited with John R. Hinnells) (Newcastle: Oriel Press, 1972). ISBN 0-85362-137-3
- Faith Meets Faith: some Christian attitudes to Hinduism in the nineteenth and twentieth Centuries (London: SCM Press, 1977). ISBN 0-334-00460-8
- Understanding Religion (London: Duckworth, 1983/New York: St. Martin's Press, 1983). US ISBN 0-312-83208-7
- Karl Ludvig Reichelt: Scholar, Missionary, Pilgrim (Hong Kong: Tao Fong Shan Christian Center, 1984).
- The Universal Gita (La Salle: Open Court, 1985). ISBN 0-8126-9001-X
- Nathan Soderblom and the Study of Religion (Chapel Hill: University of North Carolina Press, 1990). ISBN 0-8078-1868-2
- The Riddle of Sadhu Sundar Singh (New Delhi: Intercultural Publications, 2004). ISBN 81-85574-60-X
