= Edward Barnes (1892–1941) =

Edward Barnes (1892 – 31 May 1941) was a professor of chemistry at the Madras Christian College and also an amateur botanist. He described several new species of Sonerila, Impatiens and Arisaema from the hills of Tamil Nadu.

Barnes studied chemistry at London and was the founding head of the department of chemistry at the Madras Christian College around 1930. Barnes married Alice Mary daughter of Harry Varley on 8 April 1930. They set up home on the college campus in Barnes Villa, built in 1932. In their spare time, the couple collected botanical specimens, some of which were submitted to the Kew Botanical Gardens and some species like Impatiens laticornis were described by other botanists like C.E.C. Fischer. Barnes and his wife Alice introduced several plants into the campus of the Madras Christian College and established a nursery there with the help of F. H. Gravely. Alice was a principal at the Bentinck School for girls between 1933 and 1942. She received a Kaiser-i-Hind medal for her services. Begonia aliciae was named by Fischer after Alice while he described Impatiens neo-barnesii after Edward. Alice had been involved with the Student Christian Movement when studying at University College London but after moving to India she became a Quaker through her husband and introduced Marjorie Sykes to various Indian contacts through their circles. Alice edited the publication of a series of letters written by Gandhi to Esther Faering in 1956 titled "My Dear Child".

Barnes died of pneumonia and was buried in the Holy Trinity Church at Yercaud. After the death of her husband "Ted", Alice lived in Kotagiri along with Marjorie Sykes and Mary Barr.
