= Ravi Arvind Palat =

American sociologist

Ravi Arvind Palat (born 1955) is Emeritus Professor at the Department of Sociology, Binghamton University, The State University of New York and Affiliated Faculty, College of Wooster, OH. He has undertaken research in historical sociology, political economy, nationalism and ethnic conflict, social theory. The common theme in his work is "excavating the Eurocentric biases of social theory".

He is the author of Capitalist Restructuring and the Pacific Rim (Routledge, London, 2004, ISBN 978-0-415-13074-5).; and The Making of an Indian Ocean World-Economy: Princes, Paddy fields, and Bazaars (Palgrave, New York, 2015, ISBN 978-1-137-54219-9).

== Membership of Editorial Boards of Peer Reviewed Academic Journals ==
- Review, Fernand Braudel Center, Binghamton University, 2002-2020
- Critical Asian Studies, 2002-.
- Development and Society
