= Maddela Abel =

Indian political scientist

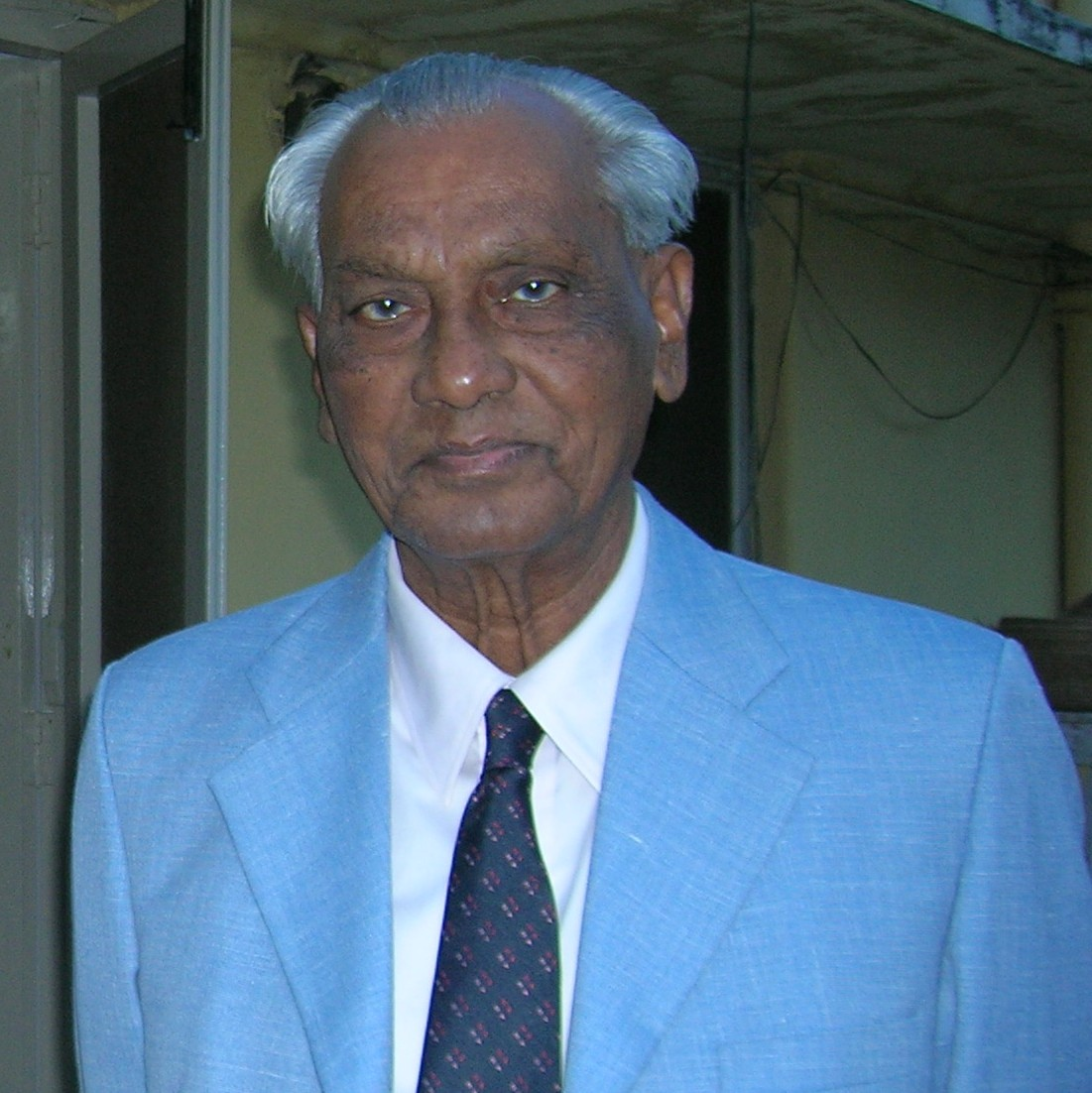
- Abel in 2006, Hyderabad, India
- Born: 30 December 1923; Pedda Vangali, Chagalamarri Mandal, Kurnool district (Andhra Pradesh)
- Died: 27 November 2012 (aged 88)
- Other name: Abel Ayyagaru
- Occupation: Teaching
- Years active: 1950-2012
- Known for: Political Science
- Title: Professor
- Board member of: ICSSR Review Committee (1972-1973); United Theological College, Bangalore, Church's Auxiliary for Social Action, Chennai, National Council of Churches in India, Nagpur, World Council of Churches, Geneva, Christian Literature Society, Chennai, National Institute for Research and Social Action, Hyderabad (1997); Dharma Bharathi National Movement of Peace and Value Education, Nagpur (1992-1994); Pravaham, Venkatapuram (1993-2012)
- Children: Dharmaraj Abel, Kalavathy Abel-Rajkumar, Deepthi Abel-Sukumar, Rekha Abel

Academic background
- Education: B. A. (Andhra), M. A. (Madras), Ph. D. (California); AELC-Andhra Christian College, Guntur (Andhra Pradesh), Madras Christian College, Tambaram (Tamil Nadu), University of California, Los Angeles (United States)
- Thesis: American Economic and Technical Aid Programs in India, 1950-1961 (1963)
- Doctoral advisor: H. Arthur Steiner

Academic work
- Institutions: Madras Christian College, Tambaram (Tamil Nadu) (1950-1981), Sri Krishnadevaraya University, Anantapur (Andhra Pradesh) (1981-1987)
- Notable ideas: Revival of University administration

Maddela Abel (30 December 1923 – 27 November 2012) was an Indian political scientist. He was a prominent educationist, well known among University circles for his administration and served as Principal of Madras Christian College (1978–1981) and Vice Chancellor of Sri Krishnadevaraya University (1981–87).

== Early life and education ==
Abel was born in Pedda Vangali, a village in Kurnool district of Andhra Pradesh (AP). He studied BA in Andhra Christian College (1945–48), and MA in Madras Christian College (1948–50). After teaching for several years at Madras Christian College (MCC), he went to University of California, Los Angeles on a Fulbright/Smith-Mundt Scholarship, earning a PhD in international relations in 1963. A member of the Phi Beta Kappa Society, he received the Danforth Foundation Fellowship in 1960 and was also named "best foreign student."

== Career ==
Abel was Professor of Political Science in MCC from 1950, and Principal of MCC, 1978-81. The Government of AP then invited him to be the first Vice-Chancellor of Sri Krishnadevaraya University (1981–87). Thereafter, he served as the first Vice-Chairman of AP State Council of Higher Education (1987–88).

He was an Executive Member of National Council of Churches in India, Executive Member of the Church of South India (CSI) Synod, and the President of the Christian Literature Society (CLS). CSI commissioned Abel to study the life, service and witness of the church. The outcome was the report, The Church of South India after Thirty Years. Report of the Abel Commission (CLS, 1978). It spoke of several reforms the Church in India needed to undertake.

Abel was awarded DLitt by Sri Krishnadevaraya University in 2005.

== Writings ==
Apart from several Endowment Lectures, Abel also published numerous articles and several books. His articles deal with the areas of political administration, ideologies, economic development, subaltern studies, Dalit concerns, Christian higher education, and church administration.

=== In books ===
- Abel, M. (1957). March to Freedom. Royal and Co.
- Abel, M. (1969). My Country, My People. National Council of Churches in India and Christian Literature Society.
- Abel, M. (1970). Intelligent Citizens Handbook of Government and Politics of India. Christian Literature Society.
- Abel, M. (1978). The Church of South India after Thirty Years. Christian Literature Society.
- Abel, M. (1993). Liberation in Christ. Christian Literature Society.
- Abel, M. (1994). Amrutha Vani. Christian Literature Society.
- Abel, M. (2000). Peace and Value Education for Schools: A Teacher's Manual. Dharma Bharathi.
- Abel, M. (2004). A Handbook on College Administration. Madabhushi Ananthasayanam Institute of Public Affairs.
- Abel, M. (2005). Glimpses Of Indian National Movement. ICFAI Books. ISBN 81-7881-420-X.
- Abel, M. (2006). Remade in India: Political Modernization in the Indian Context. ICFAI Books. ISBN 81-314-0478-1.
- Abel, M. (2013). God and Government: Sermons on Society and Spirituality. Chennai: The Christian Literature Society.

=== In journals ===
- Abel, M. (1995). "The Challenge of Pluralistic Societies in South Asia". National Council of Churches Review. 115. Nagpur.

Educational offices
Preceded by Position created	Vice-Chancellor, Sri Krishnadevaraya University, Anantapur, Andhra Pradesh; 1981-1987	Succeeded by K. Venkata Reddy
Academic offices
Preceded by Bennet Albert	Principal, Madras Christian College, Tambaram, Tamil Nadu; 1978-1981	Succeeded by Mithra G. Augustine
Honorary titles
Preceded by	President, Council of United Theological College, Bangalore, Karnataka	Succeeded by
