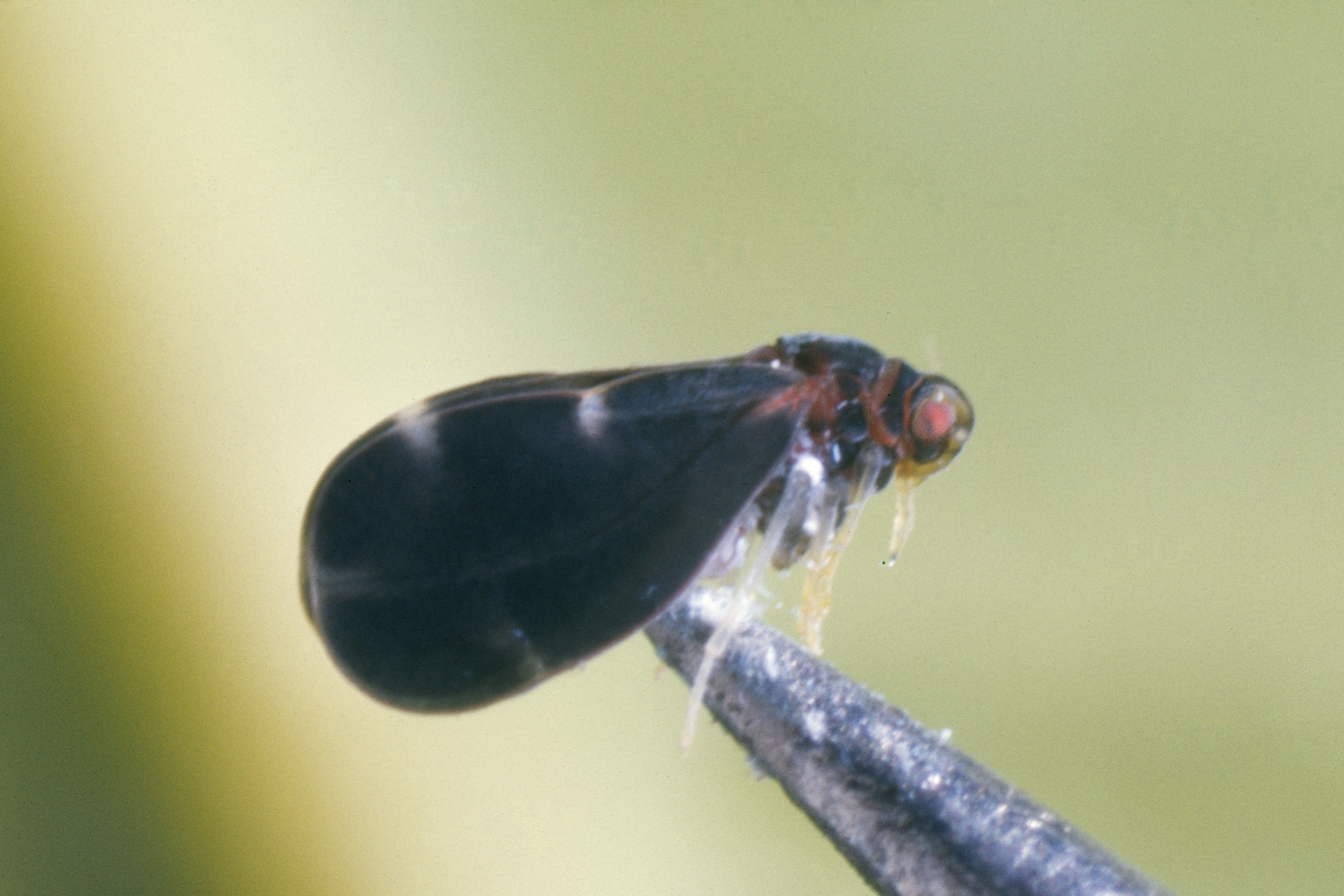
- Aleurocanthus woglumi

Scientific classification
- Domain: Eukaryota
- Kingdom: Animalia
- Phylum: Arthropoda
- Class: Insecta
- Order: Hemiptera
- Suborder: Sternorrhyncha
- Family: Aleyrodidae
- Genus: Aleurocanthus; Quaintance & Baker, 1914

Synonyms
- Aleuracanthus Handlirsch, 1925

= Aleurocanthus =

Genus of true bugs

Aleurocanthus is a genus of whiteflies in the family Aleyrodidae.

== Species ==
The following species are recognised in the genus Aleurocanthus:

- Aleurocanthus arecae David & Manjunatha, 2003
- Aleurocanthus ashleyi Gillespie, 2012
- Aleurocanthus ayyari Regu & David, 1993
- Aleurocanthus bambusae (Peal, 1903)
- Aleurocanthus bangalorensis Dubey & Sundararaj, 2004
- Aleurocanthus banksiae (Maskell, 1896)
- Aleurocanthus brevispinosus Dumbleton, 1961
- Aleurocanthus callistemonus Gillespie, 2012
- Aleurocanthus calophylli (Kotinsky, 1907)
- Aleurocanthus camelliae Kanmiya & Kasai, 2011
- Aleurocanthus ceracroceus Martin, 1999
- Aleurocanthus cheni Young, 1942
- Aleurocanthus chiengmaiensis Takahashi, 1942
- Aleurocanthus cinnamomi Takahashi, 1931
- Aleurocanthus citriperdus Quaintance & Baker, 1916
- Aleurocanthus clitoriae Jesudasan & David, 1991
- Aleurocanthus cocois Corbett, 1927
- Aleurocanthus coombsi Gillespie, 2012
- Aleurocanthus corbetti Takahashi, 1951
- Aleurocanthus davidi David & Subramaniam, 1976
- Aleurocanthus delottoi Cohic, 1969
- Aleurocanthus dissimilis Quaintance & Baker, 1917
- Aleurocanthus esakii Takahashi, 1936
- Aleurocanthus eugeniae Takahashi, 1933
- Aleurocanthus euphorbiae Jesudasan & David, 1991
- Aleurocanthus ficicola David, 1993
- Aleurocanthus firmianae Dubey & Sundararaj, 2004
- Aleurocanthus froggatti Martin, 1999
- Aleurocanthus gateri Corbett, 1927
- Aleurocanthus goaensis Dubey & Sundararaj, 2004
- Aleurocanthus gordoniae Takahashi, 1941
- Aleurocanthus gullanae Gillespie, 2012
- Aleurocanthus gymnosporiae Jesudasan & David, 1991
- Aleurocanthus hibisci Corbett, 1935
- Aleurocanthus hirsutus (Maskell, 1896)
- Aleurocanthus husaini Corbett, 1939
- Aleurocanthus imperialis Cohic, 1968
- Aleurocanthus inceratus Silvestri, 1927
- Aleurocanthus indicus David & Regu, 1989
- Aleurocanthus ixorae Jesudasan & David, 1991
- Aleurocanthus laurenae Gillespie, 2012
- Aleurocanthus lauriphaga Dubey & Ko, 2012
- Aleurocanthus leptadeniae Cohic, 1968
- Aleurocanthus lobulatus Jesudasan & David, 1991
- Aleurocanthus longispinus Quaintance & Baker, 1917
- Aleurocanthus loyolae David & Subramaniam, 1976
- Aleurocanthus luteus Martin, 1985
- Aleurocanthus mackenziei Cohic, 1969
- Aleurocanthus maculatus Gillespie, 2012
- Aleurocanthus mangiferae Quaintance & Baker, 1917
- Aleurocanthus martini David, 1993
- Aleurocanthus marudamalaiensis David & Subramaniam, 1976
- Aleurocanthus mayumbensis Cohic, 1966
- Aleurocanthus mcneili Gillespie, 2012
- Aleurocanthus multispinosus Dumbleton, 1961
- Aleurocanthus musae David & Jesudasan, 2002
- Aleurocanthus mvoutiensis Cohic, 1966
- Aleurocanthus neofroggatti Gillespie, 2012
- Aleurocanthus niger Corbett, 1926
- Aleurocanthus nigricans Corbett, 1926
- Aleurocanthus nubilans (Buckton, 1900)
- Aleurocanthus nudus Dumbleton, 1961
- Aleurocanthus octospinosus Gillespie, 2012
- Aleurocanthus palauensis Kuwana, 1931
- Aleurocanthus papuanus Martin, 1985
- Aleurocanthus pendleburyi Corbett, 1935
- Aleurocanthus piperis (Maskell, 1896)
- Aleurocanthus regis Mound, 1965
- Aleurocanthus rugosa Singh, 1931
- Aleurocanthus russellae Jesudasan & David, 1991
- Aleurocanthus sapindus Gillespie, 2012
- Aleurocanthus satyanarayani Dubey & Sundararaj, 2004
- Aleurocanthus schmidti Gillespie, 2012
- Aleurocanthus serratus Quaintance & Baker, 1917
- Aleurocanthus seshadrii David & Subramaniam, 1976
- Aleurocanthus shillongensis Jesudasan & David, 1991
- Aleurocanthus siamensis Takahashi, 1942
- Aleurocanthus singhi Jesudasan & David, 1991
- Aleurocanthus spiniferus (Quaintance, 1903) - citrus spiny whitefly
- Aleurocanthus spinithorax Dumbleton, 1961
- Aleurocanthus spinosus (Kuwana, 1911)
- Aleurocanthus splendens David & Subramaniam, 1976
- Aleurocanthus strychnosicola Cohic, 1966
- Aleurocanthus t-signatus (Maskell, 1896)
- Aleurocanthus terminaliae Dubey & Sundararaj, 2004
- Aleurocanthus trispina Mound, 1965
- Aleurocanthus valenciae Martin & Carver, 1999
- Aleurocanthus valparaiensis David & Subramaniam, 1976
- Aleurocanthus vindhyachali Dubey & Sundararaj, 2004
- Aleurocanthus voeltzkowi (Newstead, 1908)
- Aleurocanthus woglumi Ashby, 1915 - citrus blackfly
- Aleurocanthus zizyphi Priesner & Hosny, 1934
- BOLD:ACZ1603 (Aleurocanthus sp.)
- BOLD:ADS0074 (Aleurocanthus sp.)
