= John Anderson (missionary) =

Scottish missionary and educator in India (1805–1855)

Personal details
- Born: 23 May 1805
- Died: 25 March 1855 (aged 49)

John Anderson (1805–1855) was a Scottish missionary and the founder of the mission of the Free Church of Scotland at Madras, India.

== Early life and education ==
John Anderson was born at Craig Farm, Kirkpatrick Durham, in Galloway, on 23 May 1805. He was the eldest son in a family of nine, his father being blind. He received the rudiments of his education in the parish schools, and in his twenty-second year entered the University of Edinburgh, where he obtained prizes in Latin and in moral philosophy, distinguishing himself by his facility in Latin composition, and studying theology and church history under Thomas Chalmers and David Welch. During part of this period he taught at the Mariners' School at Leith; was tutor in the family of Alexander Cowan, Callander, and at Troqueer Holm on the Nith

== Early ministry ==
Anderson was licensed by the Presbytery of Dumfries on 3 May 1836. He volunteered for service in India (impelled chiefly by Dr Duff's missionary address to the General Assembly). He was appointed by the Foreign Mission Committee 28 June, and ordained on 13 July 1836. Travelling to India, he sailed in the Scotia on 13 August 1836. He arrived at Calcutta on 27 December and Madras 22 February 1837. On 3 April he took charge of St Andrew's School (established by two Scottish chaplains, Matthew Bowie and George James Lawrie in 1835) beginning his labours as a missionary with fifty-nine Hindu boys and young men - the nucleus of the Madras Christian College.

== Educationalist ==
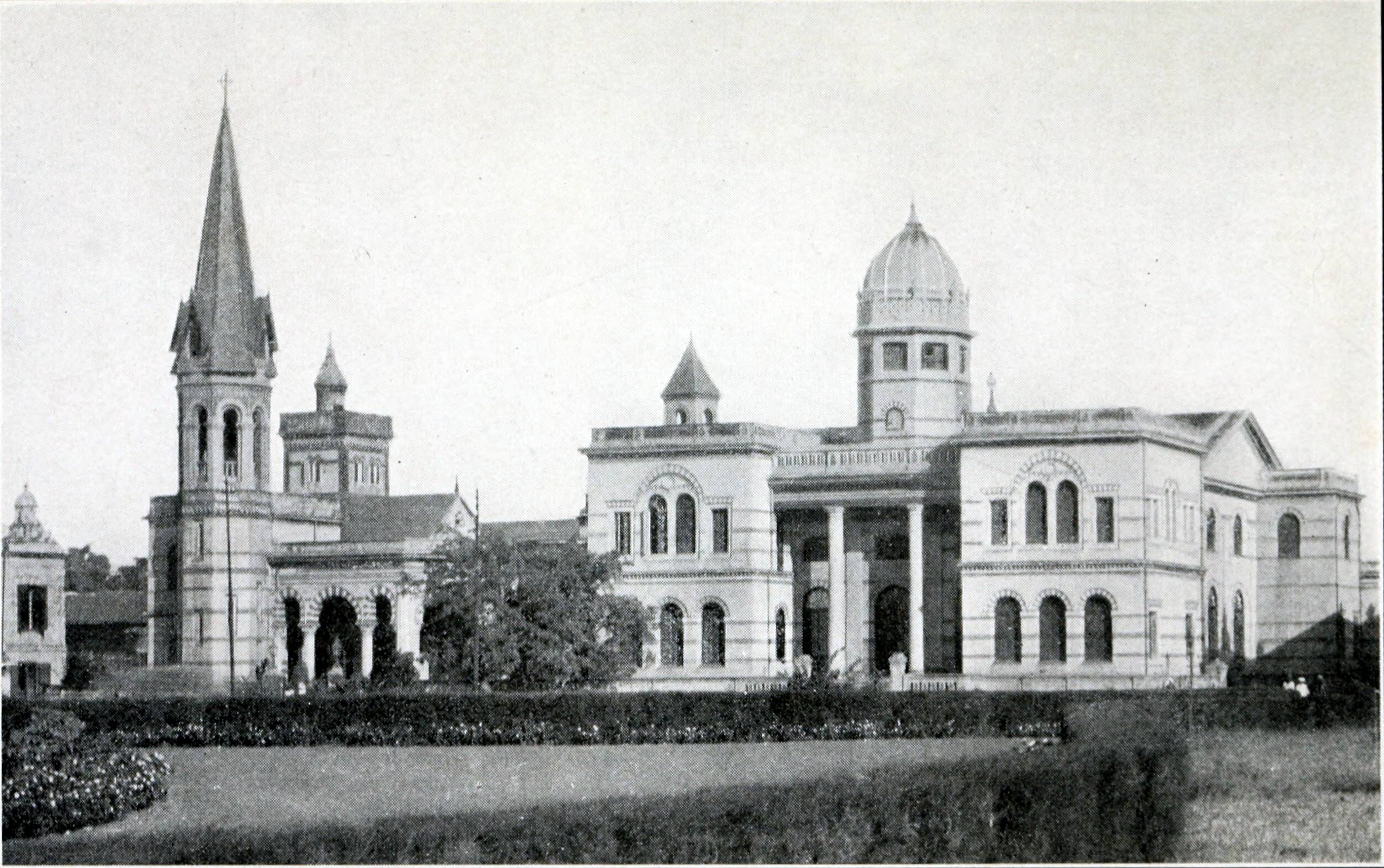
Anderson Hall, Madras, now Chennai

The branch of missionary work to which Anderson devoted himself, was education. At that time the standard of education among the natives of the Madras presidency was very low. Anderson's object, as stated in the prospectus of the first mission school opened by him at Madras, was ‘to convey through the channel of a good education as great an amount of truth as possible to the native mind, and especially of Bible truth,’ the ultimate aim being ‘that each of these institutions shall be a normal seminary in which teachers and preachers may be trained up to convey to their benighted countrymen the benefit of a sound education and the blessings of the gospel of Christ.’ Anderson laid great stress upon education and native preachers in all missionary effort. The first school established by Anderson, which formed the nucleus of the institution now known as the Madras Christian College, speedily acquired a high reputation. The number of pupils rapidly increased, although the school was on several occasions almost broken up on the conversion to Christianity of some of the pupils, and also by the admission of pupils of low caste. Notwithstanding these difficulties and the establishment of a very efficient government school, in which the instruction given was purely secular, the mission school prospered, and in the course of a few years branch mission schools were established in the town of Madras and in some of the principal towns in the neighbouring districts. One of the leading features in Anderson's method of instruction was the practice of making the pupils question each other on the subject of the lesson, a practice which, at that time, was new, at all events, in India. In 1841 the first native converts, two in number, were baptised, and in 1846 these two converts and one other were licensed as preachers, and were ordained in 1851. Anderson never looked forward to numerous conversions as the immediate result of mission work.

In 1839 Anderson was joined by a second missionary, Reverend Robert Johnston, who proved a most valuable coadjutor. In the course of a few years the number of Scottish missionaries was increased to four.

== At the Disruption ==
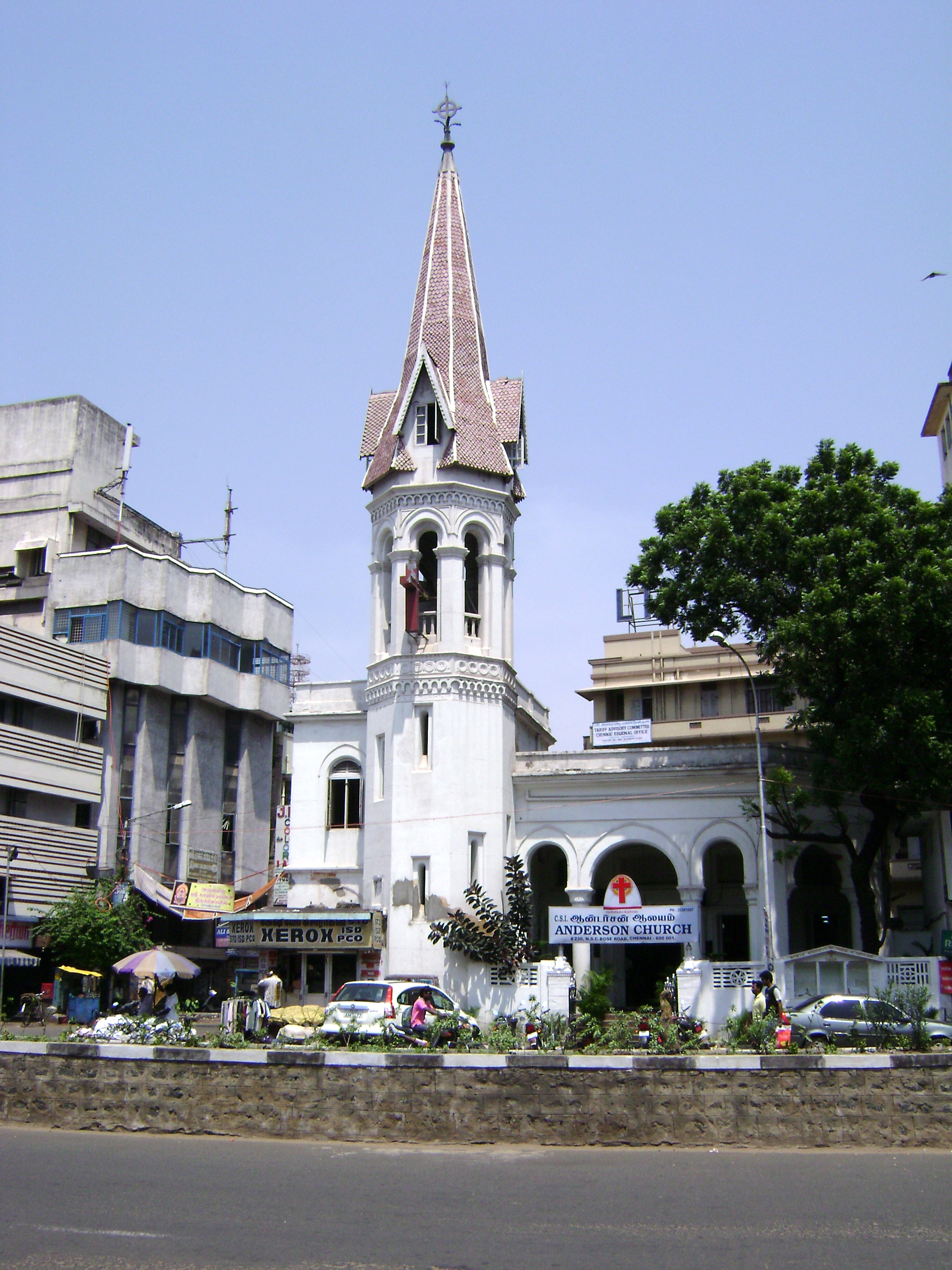
Anderson Church, Chennai

In 1843, on the Disruption of the church of Scotland, Anderson and his colleagues joined the Free Church, and thenceforward the mission was carried on in connection with that church. The subject of female education soon attracted Anderson's attention. There was no difficulty in securing the attendance of girls of the lower castes; but in the case of native caste girls the difficulty was, and still is, very great. Indian girls marry early, and native parents see none of the material benefits to be derived from their education, which induce them to send their sons to mission schools, even at the risk of their being led to change their religion. But these obstacles were gradually overcome in some measure, and before Anderson's death seven hundred Hindu and Mohammedan girls, the majority of the former belonging to families of good caste, were under instruction in the schools of the mission. In this branch of his work Anderson was greatly helped by Mrs. Anderson. Anderson revisited Scotland in 1849, when he was accompanied by P. Bajahgopaul, one of his first converts. He returned to India in December 1850 and died on 25 March 1855.

== Death and legacy ==
Anderson died at Madras in March 1855, after a short illness. He had laboured indefatigably for eighteen years at the work for which he had been set apart; only once during that period revisiting his native land, whither he was accompanied by the Rev. P. Rajahgopál, one of his first converts. His constitution, naturally strong, had become enfeebled by his incessant toils and anxieties in a debilitating climate. His work for India was entirely educational. He established schools in various centres, and greatly helped by his wife, devoted himself to the instruction of native girls of all castes and creeds giving special attention to those of higher caste as being more difficult to draw within Christian influences. Before his death seven hundred Hindu and Mohammedan girls were in attendance at his mission schools.

The Anderson Church, Chennai is named after him.

== Family ==
He married 29 January 1847, Margaret Locher (died without issue), a Swiss lady from Zurich, appointed in 1845 missionary at Madras of the Ladies' Association of the Church of Scotland. She joined the Free Church in April 1846.
