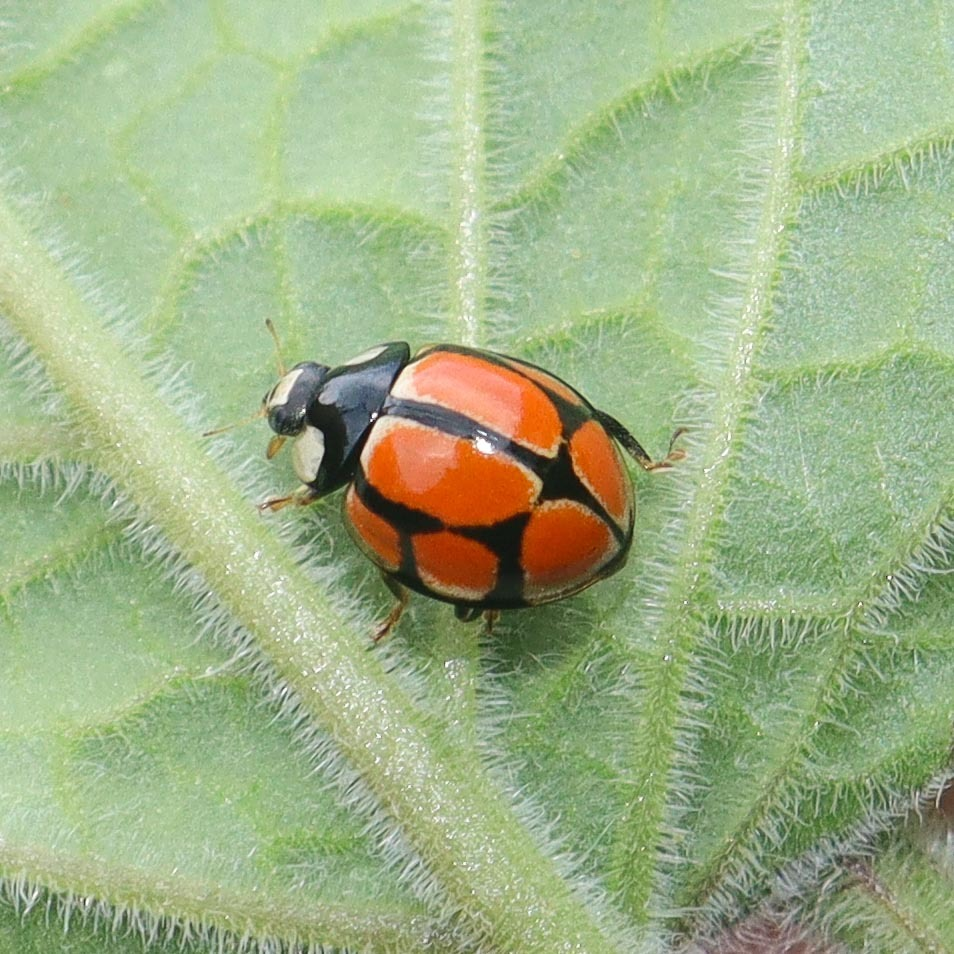

Scientific classification
- Kingdom: Animalia
- Phylum: Arthropoda
- Clade: Pancrustacea
- Class: Insecta
- Order: Coleoptera
- Suborder: Polyphaga
- Infraorder: Cucujiformia
- Family: Coccinellidae
- Genus: Propylea
- Species: P. luteopustulata

Binomial name
- Propylea luteopustulata (Mulsant, 1850)

Synonyms
- Oenopia luteopustulata Mulsant, 1850; Coccinella ramosa Olivier, 1808; Anatis thibetina Mulsant, 1853; Coelophora mariae Mulsant, 1853; Coelophora pedicata Mulsant, 1853; Coelophora victoriae Mulsant, 1866; Oenopia pracuae Weise, 1892; Coelophora birmanica Gorham, 1895; Halyzia thoracica eise, 1895; Coelophora insularis Sicard, 1912; Coelophora korschefskii Mader, 1930; Oenopia hauseri Mader, 1930; Coelophora weisei Miwa, 1931; Oenopia bluethgeni Mader, 1933

= Propylea luteopustulata =

Species of beetle

Propylea luteopustulata is a species of lady beetle found in India, Nepal, Himalayas, Tibet, Southern China, Sri Lanka, Myanmar, and Vietnam..

Body length is about 5 to 5.3 mm. Elytral pattern is highly variable. It is found on host plants such as Bidens pilosa, and Galinsoga parviflora. It is a predator of many aphid species such as, Aphis craccivora, Aphis gossypii, Aphis rumicis, Brachycaudus helichrysi, Brevicoryne brassicae, Lipaphis pseudobrassicae and Myzus persicae.
