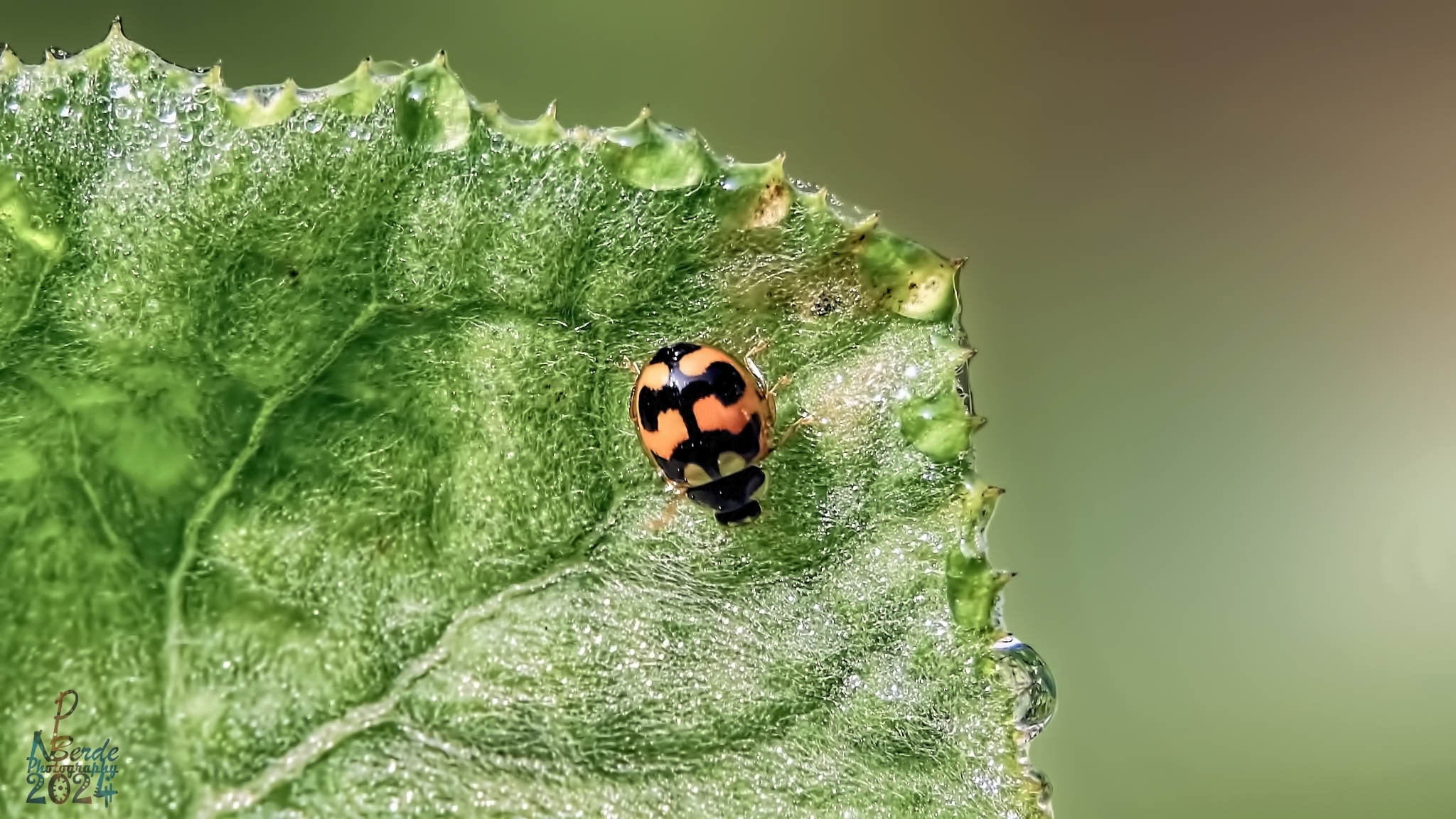

Scientific classification
- Kingdom: Animalia
- Phylum: Arthropoda
- Clade: Pancrustacea
- Class: Insecta
- Order: Coleoptera
- Suborder: Polyphaga
- Infraorder: Cucujiformia
- Family: Coccinellidae
- Genus: Propylea
- Species: P. dissecta

Binomial name
- Propylea dissecta (Mulsant, 1850)

Synonyms
- Lemnia dissecta Mulsant, 1850; Lemnia mystacea Mulsant, 1853; Harmonia feliciae Mulsant, 1866; Propylea fallax Iablokoff-Khnzorian, 1977; Horniolus mirajensis Sathe & Bhosale, 2002

= Propylea dissecta =

Species of beetle

Propylea dissecta is a species of lady beetle native to India, Sri Lanka, Bangladesh and Nepal.

== Description ==
This robust beetle is about 5 to 6 mm in length. Elytra reddish orange in color with black central line. Adults show polymorphism with several intermediate and pale forms.

== Biology ==
Sexual maturity of male and female ladybirds is about 7 and 9 days respectively. Adult males are more willing to mate with females irrespective of age. Mating duration is longest amongst older adults where 30 day-old males and 20 day-old females can be found. Chemical signals as well as visual and tactile cues initiate male attraction toward females. Mating lasted longest about 275 minutes when it occurred between unmated individuals.

It is a voracious predator on several aphids such as Aphis gossypii, Aphis craccivora, Lipaphis erysimi, Uroleucon compositae, Brevicoryne brassicae, Rhopalosiphum maidis and Myzus persicae.
