= Aphelinus thomsoni =

Aphelinus certus

Scientific classification
- Domain: Eukaryota
- Kingdom: Animalia
- Phylum: Arthropoda
- Class: Insecta
- Order: Hymenoptera
- Family: Aphelinidae
- Genus: Aphelinus
- Species: A. thomsoni

Binomial name
- Aphelinus thomsoni Graham, 1976

Species of wasp

Aphelinus thomsoni is a parasitoid wasp that parasitizes the sycamore aphid, Drepanosiphum platanoidis.
