= Aphelinus asychis =

Scientific classification
- Kingdom: Animalia
- Phylum: Arthropoda
- Class: Insecta
- Order: Hymenoptera
- Family: Aphelinidae
- Genus: Aphelinus
- Species: A. asychis

Binomial name
- Aphelinus asychis Walker, 1839

Species of wasp

Aphelinus asychis is a parasitoid wasp native to Eurasia that was introduced to North America to control the Russian wheat aphid. It has six different aphid hosts, including Acyrthosiphon pisum.

Recent work shows that the species as currently described does not form a monophyletic group and its taxonomy and phylogenetic relationship should be re-examined.
