= Coccophagus acanthosceles =

Scientific classification
- Domain: Eukaryota
- Kingdom: Animalia
- Phylum: Arthropoda
- Class: Insecta
- Order: Hymenoptera
- Family: Aphelinidae
- Subfamily: Coccophaginae
- Genus: Coccophagus
- Species: C. acanthosceles

Binomial name
- Coccophagus acanthosceles Waterston, 1916

Species of wasp

Coccophagus acanthosceles is a species of chalcid wasp belonging to the family Aphelinidae. It is found in southern Asia.

It is a primary parasitoid on scale insects of the family Coccidae including Saissetia formicarii and members of the genus Lecanium.
