= Botryoideclava bharatiya =

Scientific classification
- Domain: Eukaryota
- Kingdom: Animalia
- Phylum: Arthropoda
- Class: Insecta
- Order: Hymenoptera
- Family: Aphelinidae
- Genus: Botryoideclava
- Species: B. bharatiya

Binomial name
- Botryoideclava bharatiya Subba Rao, 1980

Species of wasp

Botryoideclava bharatiya is a chalcid wasp belonging to the family Aphelinidae. It parasitizes Melanaspis glomerata, a pest of sugarcane.
