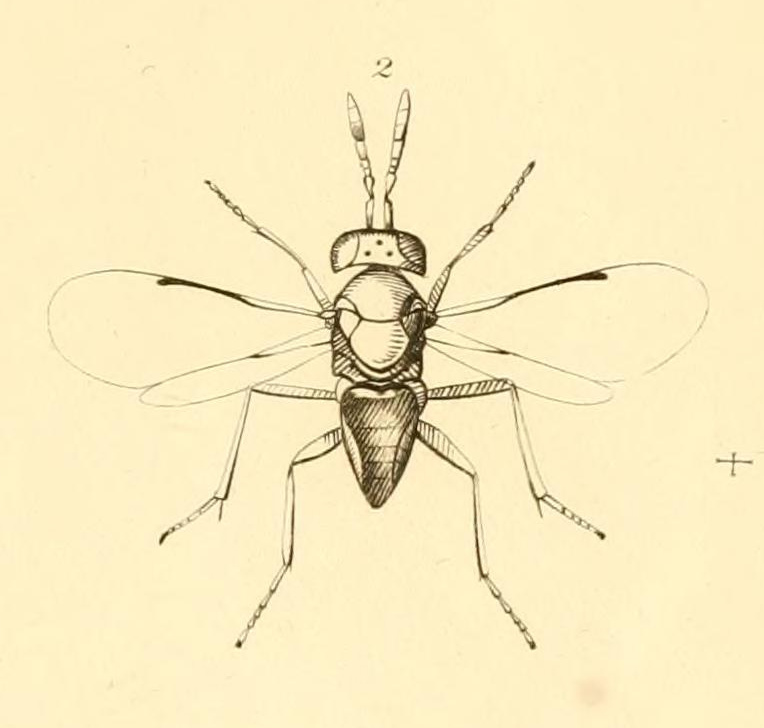
- A Haliday: Aphelinus basalis mas Monographia Chalciditum

Scientific classification
- Kingdom: Animalia
- Phylum: Arthropoda
- Class: Insecta
- Order: Hymenoptera
- Family: Aphelinidae
- Genus: Aphelinus
- Species: A. abdominalis

Binomial name
- Aphelinus abdominalis (Dalman, 1820)

Synonyms
- Entedon abdominalis Dalman, 1820

= Aphelinus abdominalis =

Species of wasp

Aphelinus abdominalis is a parasitoid wasp and biocontrol agent used to control several aphid species that are pests of agricultural crops, including the potato aphid Macrosiphum euphorbiae.
