= Aphelinus certus =

Scientific classification
- Domain: Eukaryota
- Kingdom: Animalia
- Phylum: Arthropoda
- Class: Insecta
- Order: Hymenoptera
- Family: Aphelinidae
- Genus: Aphelinus
- Species: A. certus

Binomial name
- Aphelinus certus Yasnosh, 1963

Species of wasp

Aphelinus certus is a parasitoid wasp native to Asia. It parasitizes the soybean aphid and other aphids.

== North American introduction ==
A. certus has been found in North America since 2005, and was likely introduced along with or soon after the soybean aphid.

A. certus is likely to parasitize both native and introduced aphids in North America as it has a relatively wide host-range.
