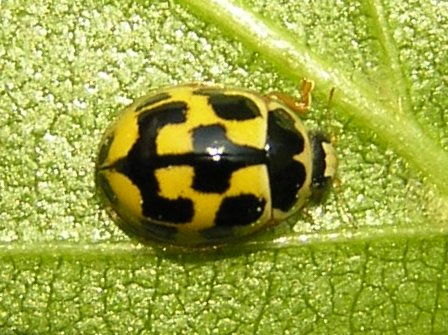

Conservation status
- Least Concern (IUCN 2.3)

Scientific classification
- Kingdom: Animalia
- Phylum: Arthropoda
- Clade: Pancrustacea
- Class: Insecta
- Order: Coleoptera
- Suborder: Polyphaga
- Infraorder: Cucujiformia
- Family: Coccinellidae
- Genus: Propylea
- Species: P. quatuordecimpunctata

Binomial name
- Propylea quatuordecimpunctata (Linnaeus, 1758)

Synonyms
- List: Coccinella quatuordecimpunctata Linnaeus, 1758; Coccinella 14-punctata Linnaeus, 1758; Halyzia (Propylaea) 14-punctata (Linnaeus, 1758); Propylea 14-punctata (Linnaeus, 1758); Coccinella duodecimpustulata Pontoppidan, 1763; Coccinella tessulata Scopoli, 1763; Coccinella fimbriata Sulzer, 1776; Coccinella tetragonata Laicharting, 1781; Coccinella quatuordecimmaculata Fabricius, 1787; Coccinella bissexpustulata Fabricius, 1801; Coccinella decempustulata Fabricius, 1792; Coccinella dentata Thunberg, 1795; Propylea conglobata Mulsant, 1856

= Propylea quatuordecimpunctata =

Species of beetle

Propylea quatuordecimpunctata is a small lady beetle, belonging to the family Coccinellidae. It is sometimes referred to by the common name 14-spotted ladybird beetle, or simply P-14.

== Varieties ==
Varieties include:

- Propylea quatuordecimpunctata var. suturalis Weise, 1879
- Propylea quatuordecimpunctata var. weisei Mader, 1931
- Propylea quatuordecimpunctata var. pedemontana Della Beffa, 1913
- Propylea quatuordecimpunctata var. frivaldskyi Sajo, 1882
- Propylea quatuordecimpunctata var. pannonica Sajo, 1882
- Propylea quatuordecimpunctata var. moravica Walter, 1882
- Propylea quatuordecimpunctata var. perlata Weise, 1879

== Description ==
In motion

The beetles are 3.5 to 4.5 millimeters long, They have a great variety of color forms: well over 100 color and pattern variations. Some of these color forms differ to the extent that at first they were thought to be separate species.

The background coloration ranges from cream through yellow to light orange, but not red. Usually there are 14 black, almost rectangular spots on the elytra, but only rarely are all of these spots separate from one another. Most commonly, several of the spots are fused into larger markings, particularly along the midline, where they often create a shape resembling an anchor, sometimes fusing to such an extent that the yellow disappears almost completely, rendering the body almost entirely black except for 12 pale yellow spots.

The pronotum is whitish or pale yellow, with four to eight black spots. The antennae and legs are yellowish-brown.

== Distribution ==
This species is native and widespread in the Palearctic north to the Arctic Circle. It is a common species in Europe, North Africa, Cyprus, European Russia, the Caucasus, Siberia, the Russian Far East, Belarus, Ukraine, Moldova, Transcaucasia, Kazakhstan, Western Asia, Pakistan, Mongolia, temperate China (Tarim Basin deciduous forests and steppe), Korea and Japan. The species is adventive and widespread in North America (southeastern Canada to the Great Lakes and Florida), and is still spreading. The initial introductions of this species in the United States were intended as a controlling agent for the Russian wheat aphid (Hoebeke 2019).

== Habitat ==
These beetles live in numerous different habitats, from lowlands to subalpine areas (Prealps), and Western European broadleaf forests, mixed forests and meadows, as well as in fields, forests, and other Life zones of central Europe. They can be found in gardens and parks, on grasses and herbaceous plants, in bushes, and trees. In addition the species can be found in forest litter, on brushwood, on coarse woody debris, in moss, in straw in sheds, in detritus and alluvial soil, in rotten plant residues, and also in compost.

== Biology ==
Propylea 14-punctata is entomophagous (insect-eating). It feeds on aphids, Aleyrodidae, Coccoidea, and on the larvae and eggs of some beetles and butterflies The females lay about 400 eggs; this is necessary as there is often a high mortality among the larvae. The adult beetles overwinter twice.

== Gallery ==
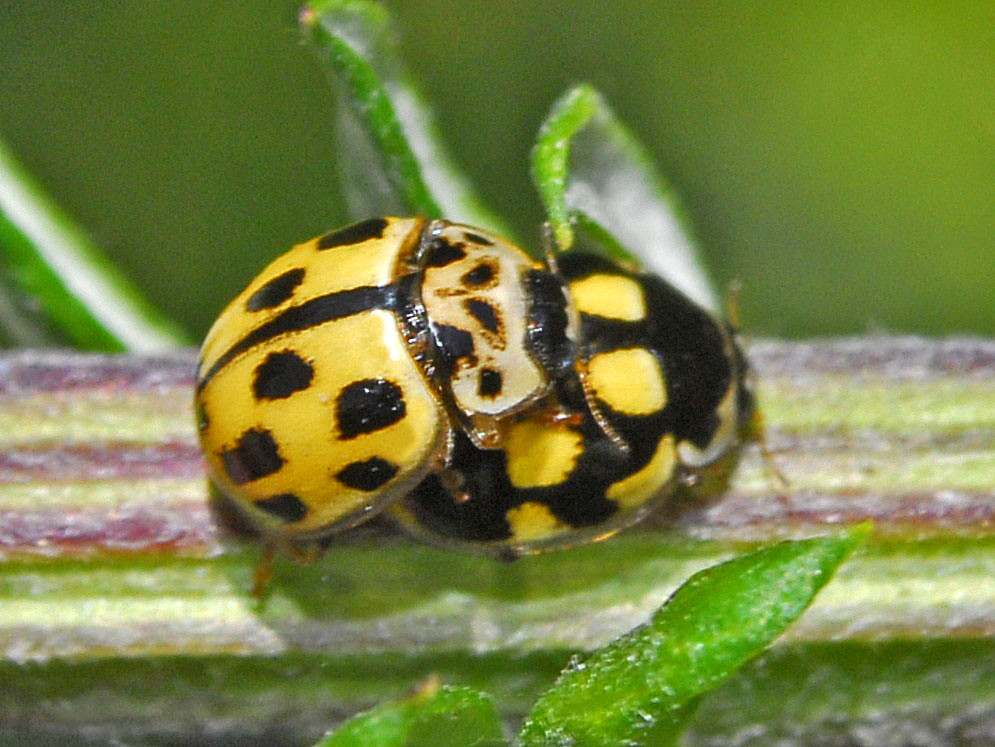
Two different variants mating

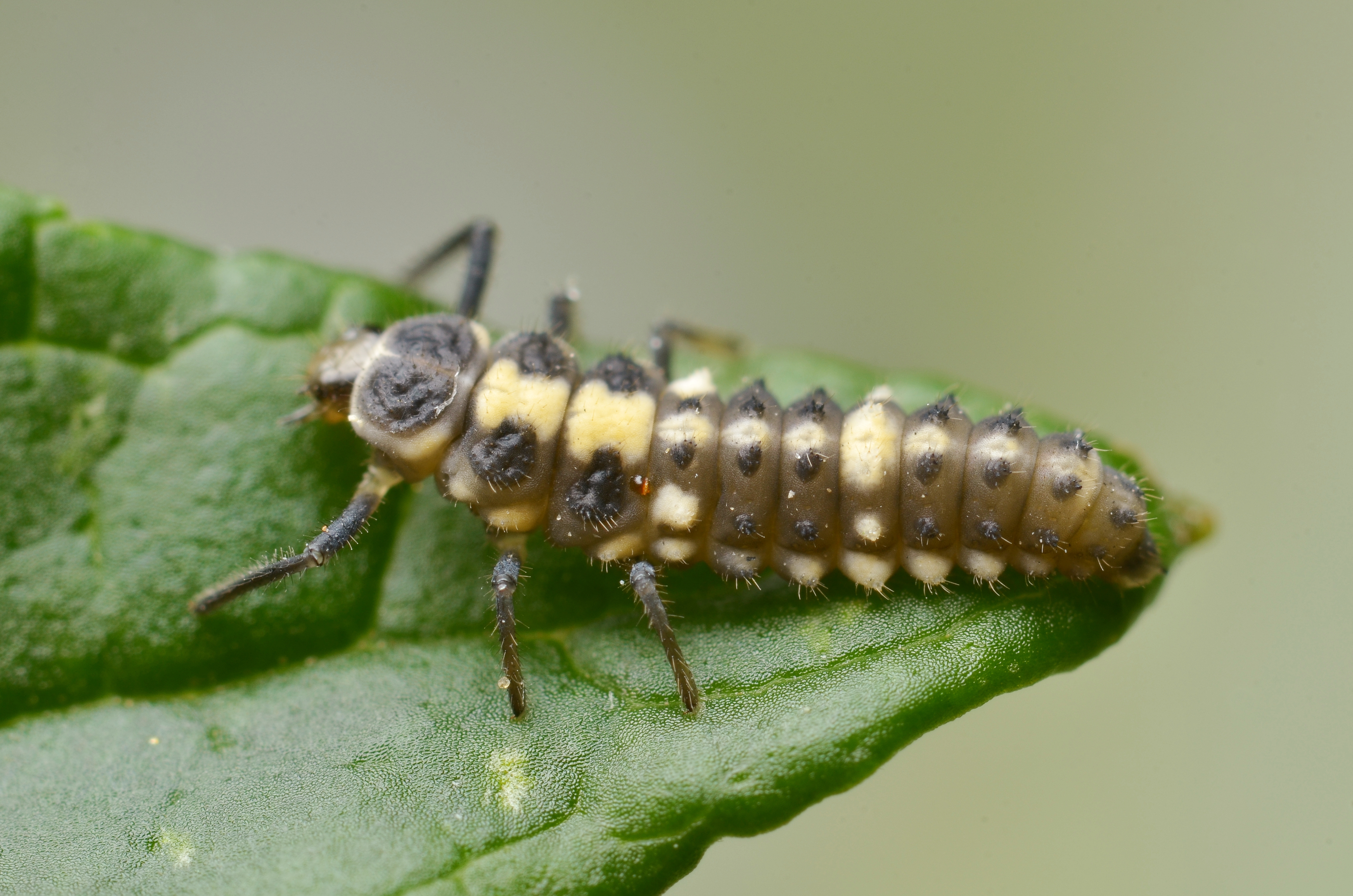
Larva

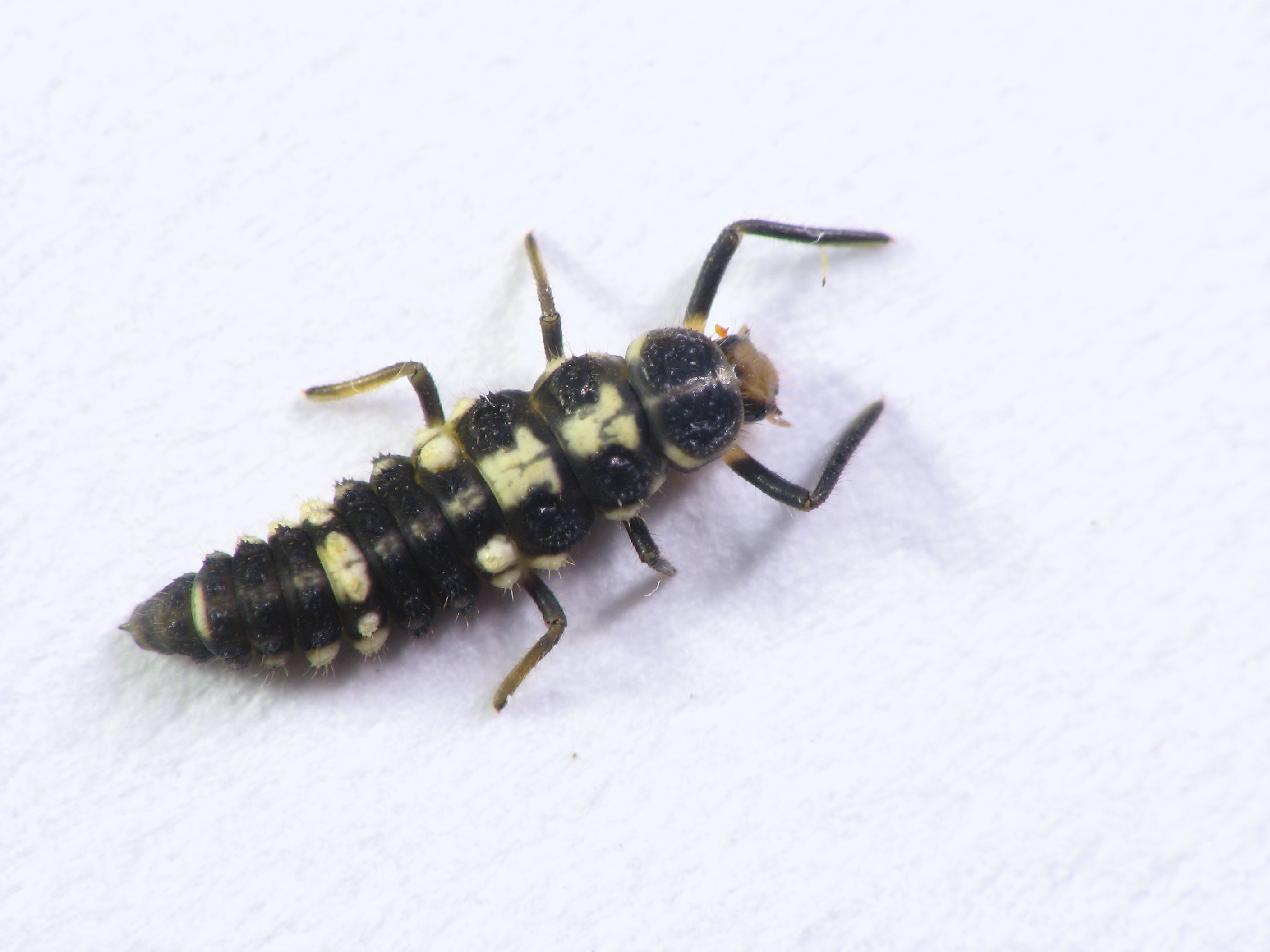
Larva

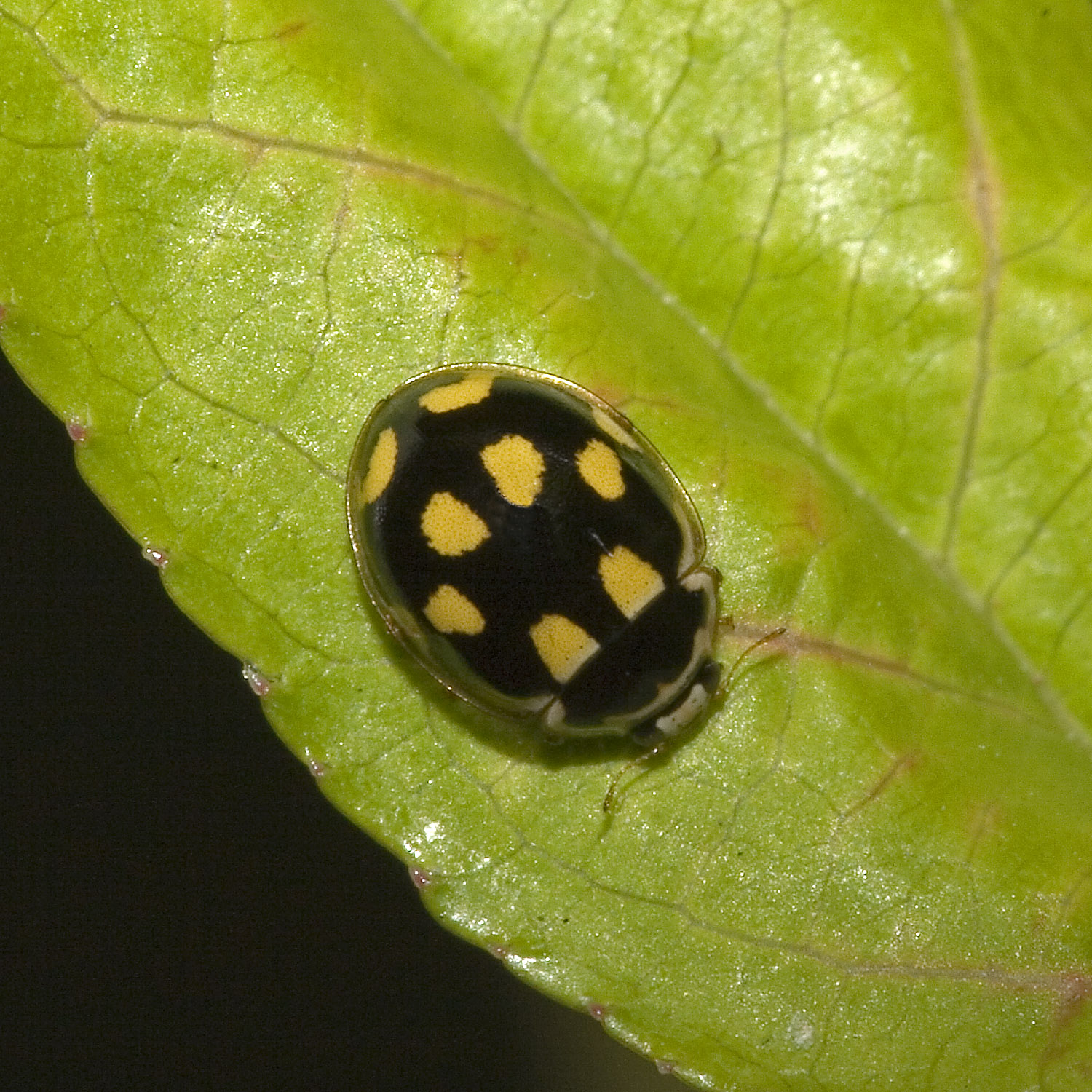
Dark variant

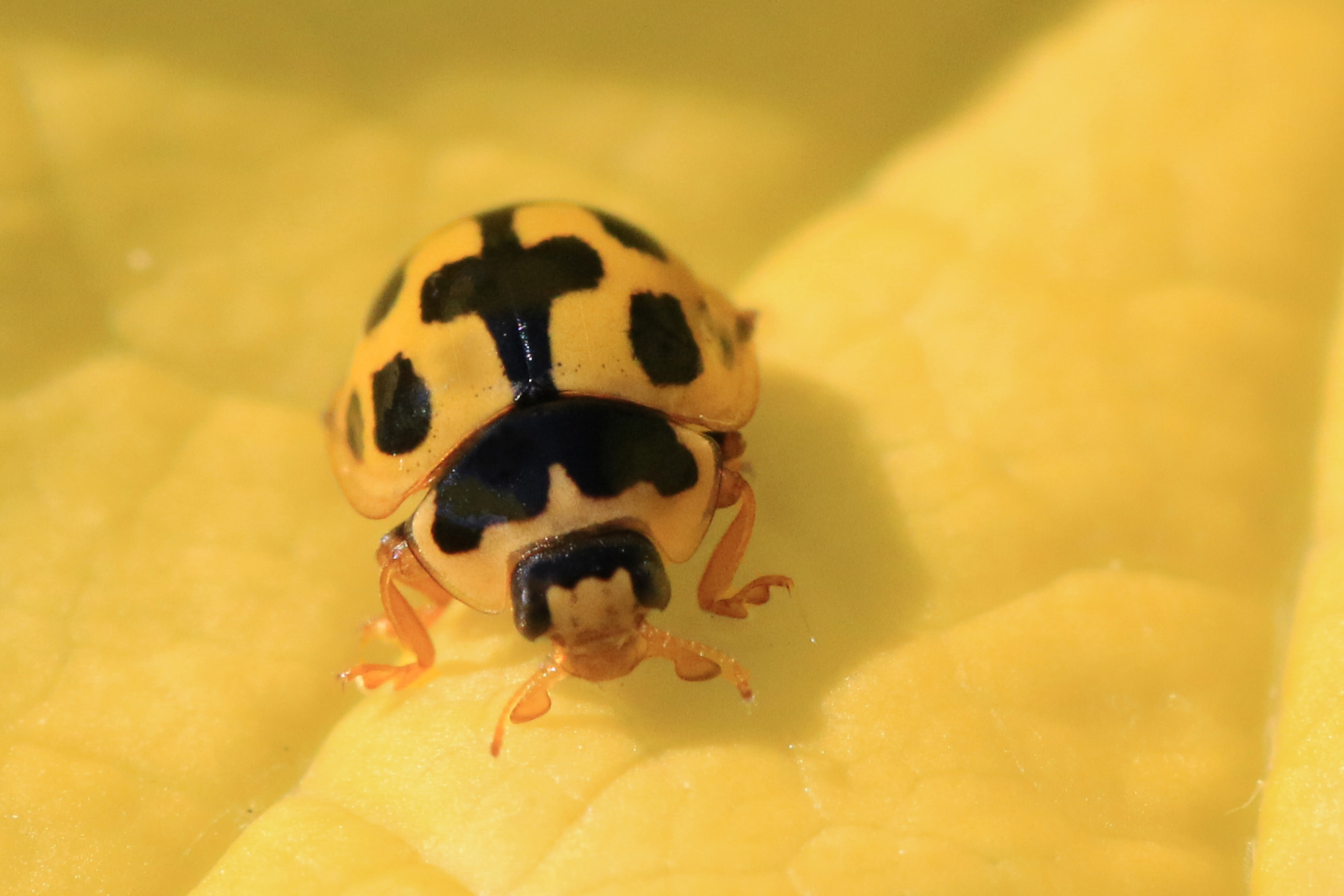
Yellow variant

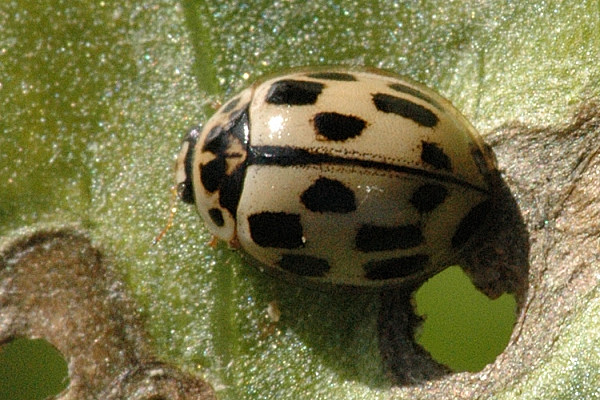
Light variant
