= Bestiola =

Bestiola may refer to:

- Bestiola, a genus of wasps in the family Aphelinidae, synonym of Proaphelinoides
- Bestiola, a genus of copepods in the family Paracalanidae, synonym of Bestiolina
- Bestiola, a 2008 album by Catalan band Hidrogenesse
