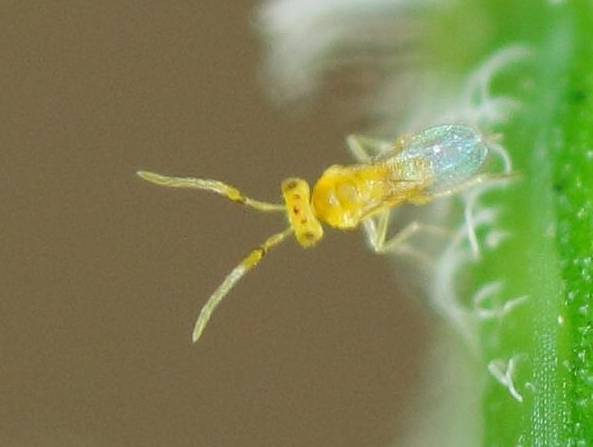
- Eretmocerus sp.

Scientific classification
- Kingdom: Animalia
- Phylum: Arthropoda
- Class: Insecta
- Order: Hymenoptera
- Family: Aphelinidae
- Genus: Eretmocerus; Haldeman, 1850

Type species
- Eretmocerus corni Haldeman, 1850

= Eretmocerus =

Genus of wasps

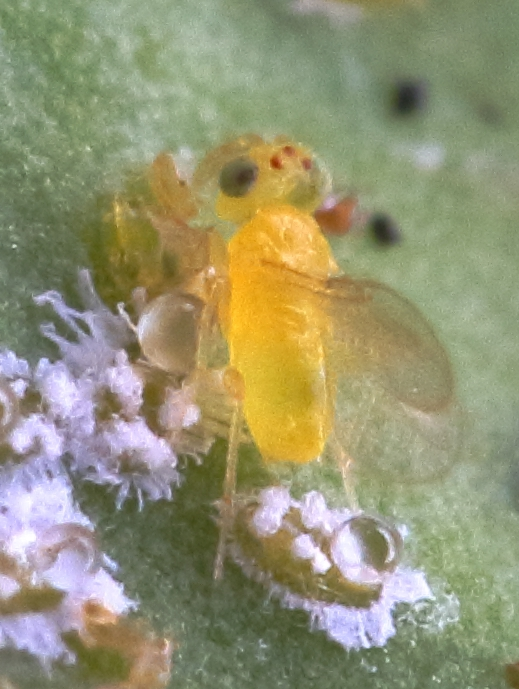
Eretmocerus sp. parasitising Aleurothrixus floccosus larvae

Eretmocerus is a genus of parasitoid wasps; they parasitise immature whiteflies.

== Diagnosis ==
Female with 5-segmented antennae with scape, pedicel, two funicular segments and club (club undifferentiated, often large and oar-shaped); male with 3-segmented antennae composed of scape, pedicel and club (club undifferentiated, elongate and exceptionally large). Forewing with stigmal vein very short; all tarsi with four segments.

== Species ==
About 84 species have been described.

Species with known whitefly hosts include:

- Eretmocerus antennator
- Eretmocerus breviclavus
- Eretmocerus californicus
- Eretmocerus comperei
- Eretmocerus corni
- Eretmocerus debachi
- Eretmocerus delhiensis
- Eretmocerus diversiciliatus
- Eretmocerus eremicus
- Eretmocerus flavus
- Eretmocerus furuhashii
- Eretmocerus gracilis
- Eretmocerus gunturiensis
- Eretmocerus haldemani
- Eretmocerus hayati
- Eretmocerus jimenezi
- Eretmocerus joeballi
- Eretmocerus longiscapus
- Eretmocerus mundus
- Eretmocerus neobemisiae
- Eretmocerus orientalis
- Eretmocerus paulistus
- Eretmocerus portoricensis
- Eretmocerus queenslandensis
- Eretmocerus roseni
- Eretmocerus rui
- Eretmocerus serius
- Eretmocerus staufferi
- Eretmocerus tejanus
- Eretmocerus trialeurodis
