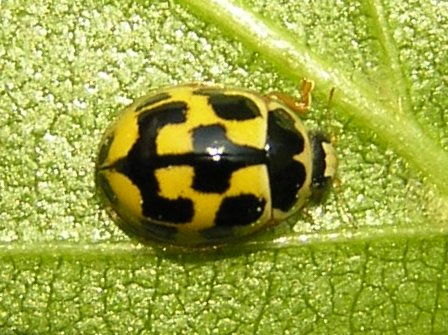
- Propylea quatuordecimpunctata

Scientific classification
- Kingdom: Animalia
- Phylum: Arthropoda
- Clade: Pancrustacea
- Class: Insecta
- Order: Coleoptera
- Suborder: Polyphaga
- Infraorder: Cucujiformia
- Family: Coccinellidae
- Tribe: Coccinellini
- Genus: Propylea; Mulsant, 1846

Synonyms
- Propylaea Mulsant, 1846 (misspelling); Vola Mulsant, 1850; Pania Mulsant, 1850

= Propylea =

Genus of beetles

Propylea is a small genus of lady beetles, including one widespread Old World species that is invasive in North America, Propylea quatuordecimpunctata.

== Species ==
- Propylea dissecta Mulsant, 1846
- Propylea japonica (Thunberg, 1781)
- Propylea luteopustulata (Mulsant, 1850)
- Propylea quatuordecimpunctata (Linnaeus, 1758)

== Gallery ==
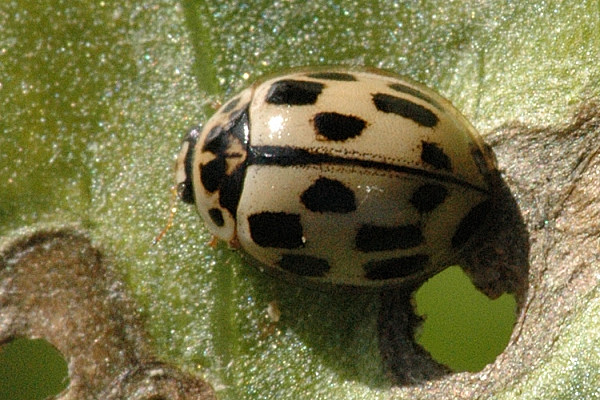
Propylea quatuordecimpunctata

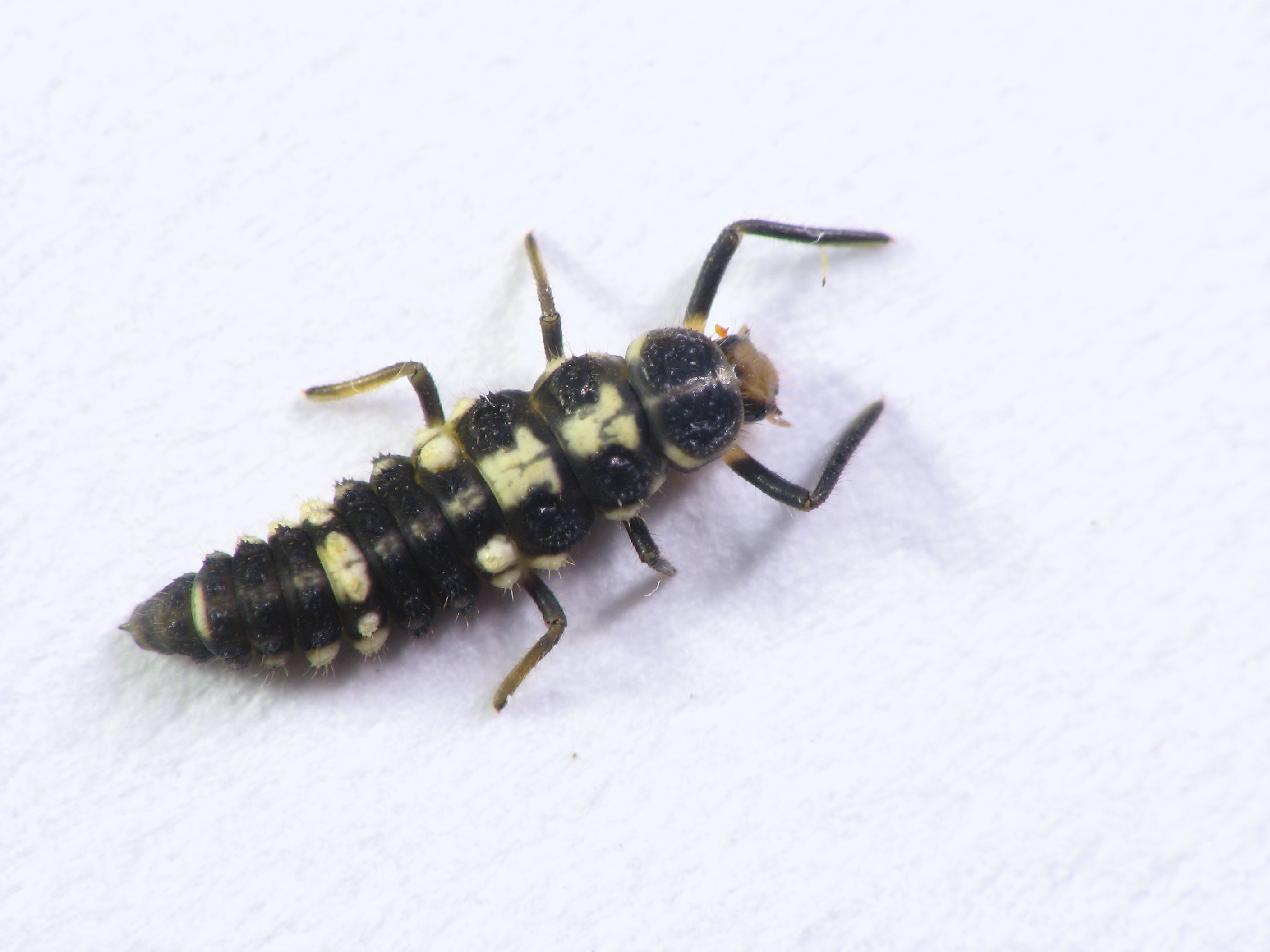
P. quatuordecimpunctata, larva
