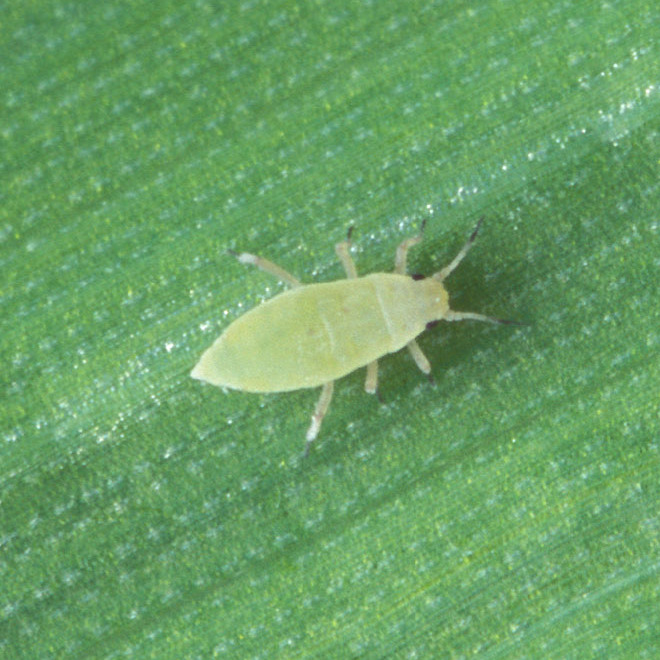
- Russian wheat aphid (Diuraphis noxia)

Scientific classification
- Domain: Eukaryota
- Kingdom: Animalia
- Phylum: Arthropoda
- Class: Insecta
- Order: Hemiptera
- Suborder: Sternorrhyncha
- Family: Aphididae
- Genus: Diuraphis; Aizenberg, 1935

= Diuraphis =

Genus of true bugs

Diuraphis is a genus of true bugs belonging to the family Aphididae.

The species of this genus are found in Europe, Central Asia and Northern America.

Species:

- Diuraphis agrostidis (Muddathir, 1965)
- Diuraphis bromicola (Hille Ris Lambers, 1959)
- Russian wheat aphid (Diuraphis noxia)
- Western wheat aphid (Diuraphis tritici) Gillette
