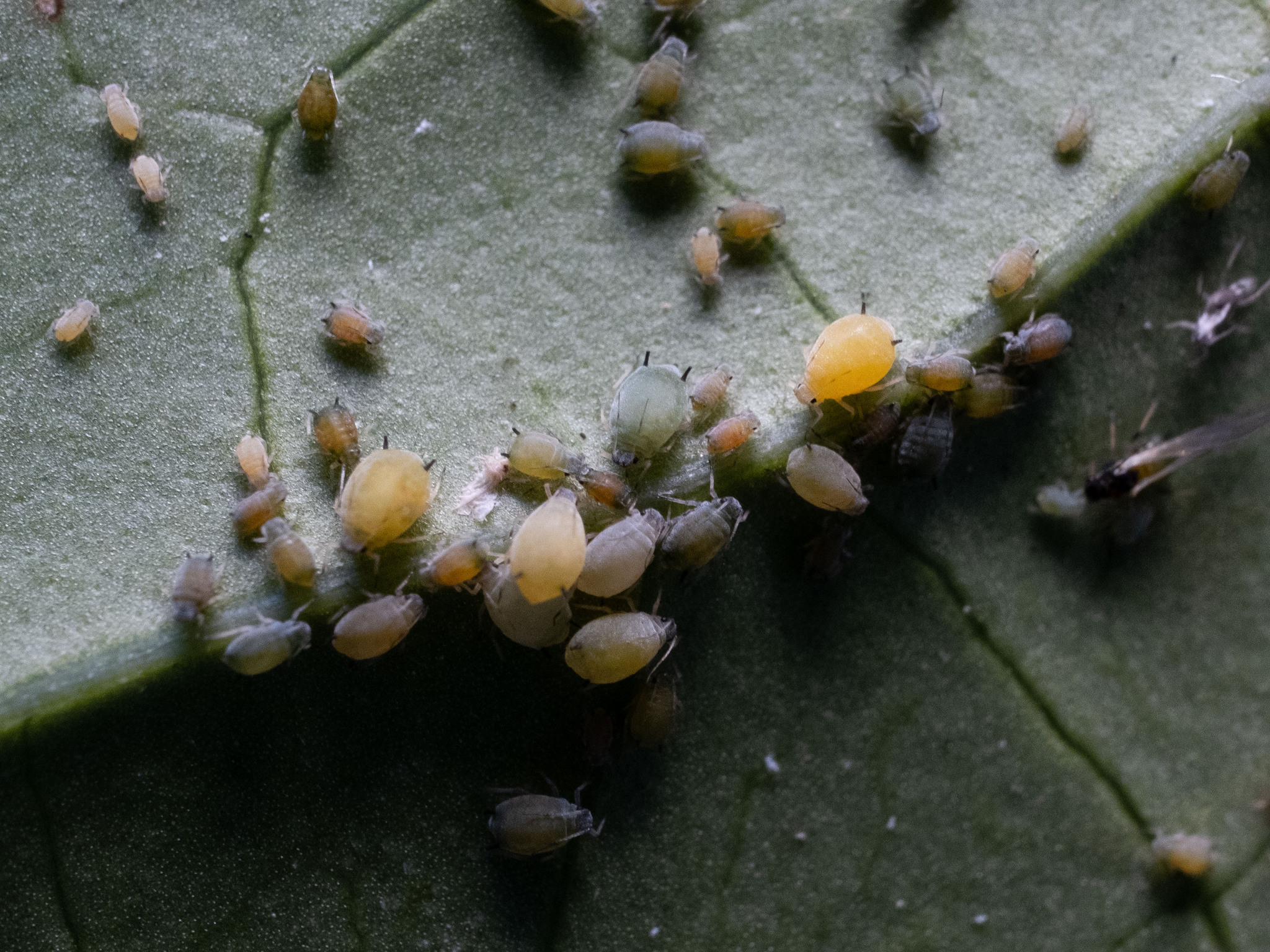

Scientific classification
- Kingdom: Animalia
- Phylum: Arthropoda
- Clade: Pancrustacea
- Class: Insecta
- Order: Hemiptera
- Suborder: Sternorrhyncha
- Family: Aphididae
- Genus: Aphis
- Species: A. gossypii

Binomial name
- Aphis gossypii Glover, 1877

Synonyms
- A. bauhiniae Theobald, 1918; A. citri Ashmead, 1909; A. citrulli Ashmead, 1882; A. cucumeris Forbes, 1883; A. cucurbiti Buckton, 1879; A. minuta Wilson, 1911; A. monardae Oestlund, 1887; Cerosypha gossypii Glover, 1877; Doralis frangulae Kaltenbach

= Aphis gossypii =

Species of insect

Aphis gossypii is a tiny insect, an aphid ("greenfly") in the superfamily Aphidoidea in the order Hemiptera. It is a true bug and sucks sap from plants. It is a widely distributed pest of a variety of agricultural crops in the families Cucurbitaceae, Rutaceae and Malvaceae. Common names include cotton aphid, melon aphid and melon and cotton aphid.

== Distribution ==
It is not known where this species originated, but it is now found in tropical and temperate regions throughout the world except extreme northern areas. It is common in North and South America, Central Asia, Africa, Australia, Brazil, East Indies, Mexico and Hawaii and in most of Europe. It is cosmopolitan in habitat. It thrives outdoors in southern Europe but survives only under glass in northern Europe. In the former Soviet Union it is found up to 54°N.

== Morphology ==
The wingless female cotton aphid has an ovoid body about two millimetres long in varying shades of green. The legs are yellow, as are the antennae which are three quarters of the length of the body. The apices of the femora, tibia and tarsi are black. The cylindrical black siphunculi are wide at the base and one fifth of the body length. The winged female has a fusiform body. Its head and thorax are black, the abdomen yellowish-green with black lateral spots and the antennae are longer than those of the apterous female. The nymphs vary in colour, being shades of green, tan and gray. They often have a dark head, thorax and wing pads and the distal portion of the abdomen is usually dark green. The body appears dull because it is dusted with wax secretions. The oval eggs are yellow when first laid but soon turn glossy black.

In the southern half of the US, as far north as Arkansas, sexual reproduction of the cotton aphid is not important. Females continue to produce offspring without mating so long as the weather is favourable for feeding and growth. Further north, the cotton aphid can be holocyclic and involve two host species, with a broadleaved tree such as Catalpa, Rhamnus or Hibiscus acting as the primary host. In Europe it reproduces exclusively by asexual reproduction and can produce nearly fifty generations a year under favourable conditions. In Russia various wild plants are hosts to the overwintering eggs. Winged forms then migrate to secondary host species in the families Rosaceae, Chenopodiaceae, Malvaceae, Cruciferae, Cucurbitaceae, Solanaceae, Compositae and others. Parthenogenesis on these hosts allows large populations of aphids to build up quickly. The life span of a parthenogenic female is about twenty days in which time it can produce up to 85 nymphs. These mature in about twenty days at 10 °C and in about four days at 30 °C. As autumn approaches, the winged forms migrate back to the primary hosts. Here, both males and sexual females are produced, mating takes place and the females lay eggs which overwinter, ready to repeat the life cycle the following year.

Predators include midges, lacewings, syrphid fly larvae, anthocorid bugs and ladybirds (ladybeetles). Several members of the Aphidiinae and Aphelinidae wasp families are parasitoids of aphids. One which shows promise as a biocontrol agent is Aphelinus asychis.

== Host plants ==
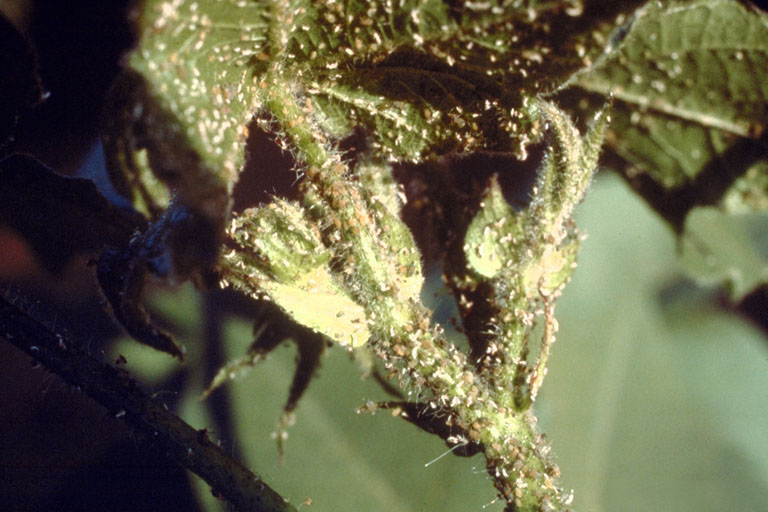
Cotton plant damaged by Aphis gossypii.

The cotton aphid has a very wide host range with at least 60 host plants being known in Florida and perhaps 700 worldwide. Among cucurbit vegetables, it can seriously affect watermelons, cucumbers, cantaloupes, squash and pumpkin. Other vegetable crops attacked include pepper, eggplant, okra and asparagus. It also affects citrus, cotton and hibiscus. It may also even spread to some varieties of catnip.

== Economic significance ==
The adults and nymphs of the cotton aphid feed on the underside of leaves or on the growing tips of shoots, sucking juices from the plant. The foliage may become chlorotic and die prematurely. There is often a great deal of leaf curling and distortion which hinders efficient photosynthesis. Honeydew is excreted by the aphids and this allows sooty moulds to grow, resulting in a decrease in the quantity and quality of the produce. The aphids are a vector of crinkle, mosaic, rosette, CTV and other virus diseases. The aphids' impact is especially important on vegetable crops such as courgette, melon, cucumber, aubergine and strawberry and on cotton, citrus and mallow.

== Insecticides ==
Carbamates and organophosphates are commonly used against A. gossypii around the world.

=== Insecticide resistance ===
Resistance to carbamates and organophosphates has been traced to two variant acetylcholinesterase genes in A. gossypii, MACE_{A} and MACE_{B}.
