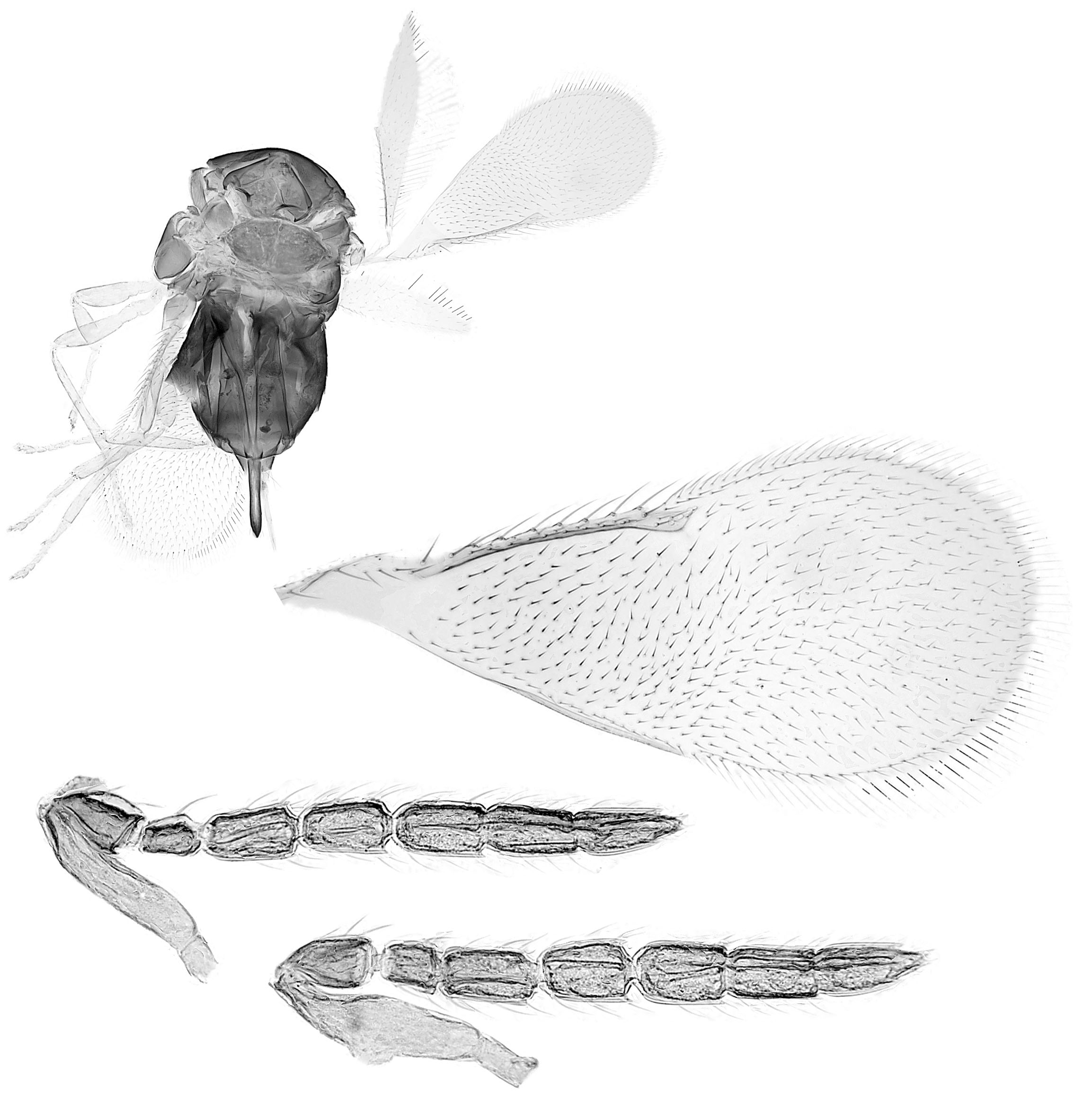

Scientific classification
- Domain: Eukaryota
- Kingdom: Animalia
- Phylum: Arthropoda
- Class: Insecta
- Order: Hymenoptera
- Family: Aphelinidae
- Subfamily: Coccophaginae
- Genus: Coccophagus; Westwood, 1833

Type species
- Coccophagus scutellaris (Dalman, 1825)

Diversity
- about 250 species, see text

= Coccophagus =

Genus of wasps

Coccophagus is a large genus of chalcid wasps belonging to the family Aphelinidae.

== Species ==
Coccophagus contains the following species:

- Coccophagus ablusus Annecke and Insley, 1974
- Coccophagus acanthosceles Waterston, 1916
- Coccophagus adumbratus Annecke and Insley, 1970
- Coccophagus adustus (Annecke and Prinsloo, 1976)
- Coccophagus aethiopis Girault, 1935
- Coccophagus aethochreus Annecke and Insley, 1974
- Coccophagus afrangiatus Viggiani, 1994
- Coccophagus africanus Risbec, 1956
- Coccophagus albiapicella De Santis, 1996
- Coccophagus albicoxa Howard, 1911
- Coccophagus albifuniculatus (Huang, 1994)
- Coccophagus amblydon Compere, 1937
- Coccophagus amoenus Hayat, 2015
- Coccophagus anchoroides (Huang, 1994)
- Coccophagus angolensis Annecke and Insley, 1974
- Coccophagus anthracinus Compere, 1925
- Coccophagus apricus Annecke and Insley, 1970
- Coccophagus argenteus Girault, 1915
- Coccophagus argentifascia Girault, 1915
- Coccophagus argentiscutellum (Girault, 1915)
- Coccophagus argocoxa Annecke and Insley, 1974
- Coccophagus assamensis Hayat, 1993
- Coccophagus asterolecanii (Dozier, 1932)
- Coccophagus atratus Compere, 1926
- Coccophagus aurantifrons (Compere, 1936)
- Coccophagus aureonotus (Howard, 1897)
- Coccophagus auricaput Girault, 1915
- Coccophagus avetianae Yasnosh and Herthevtzian, 1972
- Coccophagus baldassarii Compere, 1931
- Coccophagus bartletti Annecke and Insley, 1974
- Coccophagus basalis Compere, 1939
- Coccophagus berzeliae Annecke and Insley, 1974
- Coccophagus biguttatus Girault, 1915
- Coccophagus bimaculatus Myartseva, 2004
- Coccophagus bivittatus Compere, 1931
- Coccophagus bogoriensis (Koningsberger, 1897)
- Coccophagus brachypterus Sugonjaev, 2011
- Coccophagus brasiliensis (Compere, 1936)
- Coccophagus brethesi De Santis, 1967
- Coccophagus breviscapus Li and Chen, 2017
- Coccophagus brevisetus Huang, 1980
- Coccophagus brunneus Provancher, 1887
- Coccophagus burksi Hayat, 1971
- Coccophagus candidus Hayat, 1993
- Coccophagus caophongi Sugonjaev, 1996
- Coccophagus capensis Compere, 1931
- Coccophagus caridei (Brethes, 1918)
- Coccophagus catherinae Annecke, 1964
- Coccophagus caudatus (Huang, 1994)
- Coccophagus ceroplastae (Howard, 1895)
- Coccophagus chaetosus Sugonjaev, 1995
- Coccophagus chengtuensis Sugonjaev and Peng, 1960
- Coccophagus chilensis De Santis, 1988
- Coccophagus chloropulvinariae Hayat, 1974
- Coccophagus cinguliventris Girault, 1909
- Coccophagus clavatus Husain and Agarwal, 1982
- Coccophagus clavellatus Compere, 1931
- Coccophagus coccidarum (Ghesquiere, 1949)
- Coccophagus comperei Mercet, 1932
- Coccophagus concinnus De Santis, 1963
- Coccophagus conditus Annecke and Insley, 1974
- Coccophagus cooperatus Sugonjaev and Ren, 1993
- Coccophagus copernicus Husain and Agarwal, 1982
- Coccophagus coracinus Compere, 1940
- Coccophagus cowperi Girault, 1917
- Coccophagus crenatus Huang, 1980
- Coccophagus croconotus (Waterston, 1917)
- Coccophagus crucigerus Girault, 1931
- Coccophagus cryptus Annecke and Insley, 1974
- Coccophagus cubaensis Compere, 1931
- Coccophagus debachi Myartseva and Ruiz, 2005
- Coccophagus desantisi (Fidalgo, 1981)
- Coccophagus desertus Sugonjaev and Myartseva, 1984
- Coccophagus diabolicus (Girault, 1915)
- Coccophagus diachraceus Annecke and Insley, 1974
- Coccophagus differens Yasnosh, 1966
- Coccophagus dilatatus (Huang, 1994)
- Coccophagus diminutus Sugonjaev, 1995
- Coccophagus distinctus Li and Chen, 2017
- Coccophagus dius Hayat, 1998
- Coccophagus divisus Hayat, 2015
- Coccophagus eleaphilus Silvestri, 1915
- Coccophagus emersoni Girault, 1917
- Coccophagus equifuniculatus (Huang, 1994)
- Coccophagus eusaissetiae Ozdikmen, 2011
- Coccophagus euxanthodes Hayat, Schroer and Pemberton, 2009
- Coccophagus excelsus Erdos, 1956
- Coccophagus exiguiventris Girault, 1929
- Coccophagus fallax Compere, 1939
- Coccophagus fasciatus Annecke and Insley, 1970
- Coccophagus femoralis Myartseva, 2006
- Coccophagus flavescens Howard, 1896
- Coccophagus flaviceps Compere, 1931
- Coccophagus flavicorpus Husain and Agarwal, 1982
- Coccophagus flavidus Compere, 1940
- Coccophagus flavifrons Howard, 1885
- Coccophagus flavoscutellum Ashmead, 1881
- Coccophagus fletcheri Howard, 1897
- Coccophagus fraternus Howard, 1881
- Coccophagus fumadus Hayat, 2010
- Coccophagus funeralis Girault, 1913
- Coccophagus funiculatus Mysartseva, 2016
- Coccophagus gahani Annecke and Insley, 1974
- Coccophagus ghesquierei Hayat, 1987
- Coccophagus gigas Erdos, 1956
- Coccophagus gilvus Hayat, 1971
- Coccophagus gondolae (Castel-Branco, 1951)
- Coccophagus gonzalezi Myartseva, 2006
- Coccophagus gossypariae Gahan, 1927
- Coccophagus graminis Annecke and Insley, 1974
- Coccophagus gregarius Compere, 1931
- Coccophagus grenadensis Hayat, 1994
- Coccophagus gurneyi Compere, 1929
- Coccophagus hanoiensis Sugonjaev, 1996
- Coccophagus hawaiiensis Timberlake, 1926
- Coccophagus hemera (Walker, 1839)
- Coccophagus hibisci Sugonjaev and Ren, 1993
- Coccophagus hispaniolae (Dozier, 1932)
- Coccophagus immaculatus Howard, 1881
- Coccophagus impensus Annecke and Insley, 1974
- Coccophagus indefinitus Myartseva, 2014
- Coccophagus indochraceus Hayat, 1998
- Coccophagus inkermani Girault, 1926
- Coccophagus insidiator (Dalman, 1826)
- Coccophagus insignis Hayat and Zeya, 1993
- Coccophagus ishiii Compere, 1931
- Coccophagus isipingoensis Compere, 1931
- Coccophagus japonicus Compere, 1924
- Coccophagus jasnoshae Sugonjaev, 1978
- Coccophagus javensis Girault, 1916
- Coccophagus kabulensis Sugonjaev, 1985
- Coccophagus kvavadze Japoshvili and Karaca, 2002
- Coccophagus lepidus Compere, 1931
- Coccophagus leptospermi Girault, 1917
- Coccophagus lii (Huang, 1994)
- Coccophagus longiclavatus Shafee, 1972
- Coccophagus longicornis Hayat, 1971
- Coccophagus longifasciatus Howard, 1907
- Coccophagus longipedicellus Shafee, 1972
- Coccophagus lucani Girault, 1922
- Coccophagus lucidus Ishihara, 1977
- Coccophagus luciensis Annecke and Insley, 1974
- Coccophagus lunai Myartseva, 2006
- Coccophagus lutescens Compere, 1931
- Coccophagus lycimnia (Walker, 1839)
- Coccophagus maculipennis Yasnosh, 1966
- Coccophagus malthusi Girault, 1917
- Coccophagus mangiferae (Dozier, 1932)
- Coccophagus margaritatus Compere, 1931
- Coccophagus mariformis Compere, 1931
- Coccophagus matsuyamensis Ishihara, 1977
- Coccophagus mazatlan Myartseva, 2006
- Coccophagus meghaianus Hayat, 2010
- Coccophagus merceti Hayat, 1994
- Coccophagus mexicanus Girault, 1915
- Coccophagus mexicensis Girault, 1917
- Coccophagus minor Myartseva, 2014
- Coccophagus mixtus (Girault, 1915)
- Coccophagus modestus Silvestri, 1915
- Coccophagus multisetae Girault, 1931
- Coccophagus narendrani Hayat and Zeya, 1993
- Coccophagus neocomperei Myartseva and Ruiz, 2005
- Coccophagus neserorum (Annecke and Mynhardt, 1979)
- Coccophagus nesiotes Hayat, 2015
- Coccophagus nigrans Myartseva, 2006
- Coccophagus nigricorpus Shafee, 1972
- Coccophagus nigricoxae Karam and Ramadan, 2013
- Coccophagus nigritus Compere, 1931
- Coccophagus nigropleurum Girault, 1917
- Coccophagus nipponicus (Ishihara, 1977)
- Coccophagus nubeculus Brethes, 1913
- Coccophagus nubes Compere, 1928
- Coccophagus nympha (Girault, 1915)
- Coccophagus obscurus Westwood, 1833
- Coccophagus ochraceus Howard, 1895
- Coccophagus oculatipennis (Girault, 1916)
- Coccophagus ophicus Husain and Agarwal, 1982
- Coccophagus palaeolecanii Yasnosh, 1957
- Coccophagus pallidiceps (Compere, 1939)
- Coccophagus pallidis Huang, 1980
- Coccophagus parlobatae Hayat, 2007
- Coccophagus pellucidus (Huang, 1994)
- Coccophagus perflavus Girault, 1916
- Coccophagus perhispidus Girault, 1926
- Coccophagus pernigritus De Santis, 1948
- Coccophagus philippiae (Silvestri, 1915)
- Coccophagus physokermis Sugonjaev and Pilipyuk, 1972
- Coccophagus piceae Erdos, 1956
- Coccophagus pisinnus Annecke and Insley, 1974
- Coccophagus planus (Sugonjaev, 1969)
- Coccophagus poei Girault, 1915
- Coccophagus princeps Silvestri, 1915
- Coccophagus prinslooi Hayat, 1998
- Coccophagus probus Annecke and Mynhardt, 1979
- Coccophagus propodealis Myartseva, 2004
- Coccophagus provisus Sugonjaev and Ren, 1993
- Coccophagus proximus Yasnosh, 1966
- Coccophagus pseudococci Compere, 1933
- Coccophagus pseudopulvinariae Li, 1996
- Coccophagus pulchellus Westwood, 1833
- Coccophagus pulcher (Girault, 1914)
- Coccophagus pulcini Girault, 1926
- Coccophagus pulvinariae Compere, 1931
- Coccophagus pumilus Sugonjaev, 1994
- Coccophagus purpureus Ashmead, 1886
- Coccophagus qenai Abd-Rabou, 2003
- Coccophagus quaestor Girault, 1917
- Coccophagus redini Girault, 1924
- Coccophagus restionis Annecke and Insley, 1970
- Coccophagus rjabovi Yasnosh, 1966
- Coccophagus robustus Compere, 1931
- Coccophagus rosae Sugonjaev and Pilipyuk, 1972
- Coccophagus ruizi Myartseva, 2004
- Coccophagus rusti Compere, 1928
- Coccophagus saintebeauvei Girault, 1917
- Coccophagus saissetiae Gahan, 1922
- Coccophagus saltator Sugonjaev, 1994
- Coccophagus samarae Hayat, 1998
- Coccophagus scutatus Howard, 1895
- Coccophagus scutellaris (Dalman, 1826)
- Coccophagus secamonei Risbec, 1957
- Coccophagus semiatratus De Santis, 1947
- Coccophagus semicircularis (Foerster, 1841)
- Coccophagus sexvittatus Hayat, 1974
- Coccophagus shafeei Hayat, 1974
- Coccophagus shakespearella Girault, 1929
- Coccophagus shillongensis Hayat and Singh, 1989
- Coccophagus sibiricus Sugonjaev, 1976
- Coccophagus signatus Yasnosh, 1966
- Coccophagus signus Girault, 1920
- Coccophagus silvestrii Compere, 1931
- Coccophagus sostenesi Myartseva, 2006
- Coccophagus spartanus Japoshvili and Karaca, 2002
- Coccophagus specialis Compere, 1931
- Coccophagus speciosus Compere, 1931
- Coccophagus spectabilis Compere, 1931
- Coccophagus spireae Nikolskaya and Yasnosh, 1966
- Coccophagus srilankensis Hayat, 1988
- Coccophagus subflavescens Hayat, 1971
- Coccophagus subochraceus Howard, 1907
- Coccophagus subsignus Girault, 1932
- Coccophagus sudhiri Hayat, 1993
- Coccophagus tamaulipecus Myartseva, 2014
- Coccophagus tarongaensis Compere, 1931
- Coccophagus teeceeni Myartseva, 2004
- Coccophagus tenebrisetus Li and Chen, 2017
- Coccophagus terani De Santis, 1993
- Coccophagus tetrastichoides Sugonjaev, 2006
- Coccophagus thanhoaensis Sugonjaev, 2011
- Coccophagus tibialis Compere, 1931
- Coccophagus timberlakei Compere, 1931
- Coccophagus tobiasi Myartseva, 2004
- Coccophagus triangulatinotus Girault, 1926
- Coccophagus triguttatus Girault, 1915
- Coccophagus tropicanus Sugonjaev and Ren, 1993
- Coccophagus tschirchii Mahdihassan, 1923
- Coccophagus ussuriensis Sugonjaev, 1979
- Coccophagus varius (Silvestri, 1915)
- Coccophagus vegai Girault, 1932
- Coccophagus viator Sugonjaev, 1960
- Coccophagus vietnamicus Sugonjaev, 1998
- Coccophagus yoshidae Nakayama, 1921
- Coccophagus youngi (Girault, 1917)
- Coccophagus zebratus Howard, 1907
- Coccophagus zeyai Hayat, 1998
- Coccophagus zinniae De Santis, 1979
- Coccophagus formicariae Hayat, 1998
