= Diuraphis tritici =

Scientific classification
- Kingdom: Animalia
- Phylum: Arthropoda
- Class: Insecta
- Order: Hemiptera
- Suborder: Sternorrhyncha
- Family: Aphididae
- Genus: Diuraphis
- Species: D. tritici

Binomial name
- Diuraphis tritici Gillette 1911

Species of aphid

Diuraphis tritici, the western wheat aphid, is a wheat pest native to North America. The aphid can also live on Bromus marginatus.
