= Ablerus macrochaeta =

Scientific classification
- Domain: Eukaryota
- Kingdom: Animalia
- Phylum: Arthropoda
- Class: Insecta
- Order: Hymenoptera
- Family: Azotidae
- Genus: Ablerus
- Species: A. macrochaeta

Binomial name
- Ablerus macrochaeta Silvestri, 1927

Species of wasp

Ablerus macrochaeta is a parasitoid wasp that attacks the silverleaf whitefly and Aleurocanthus inceratus. The latter is a serious pest of sweet potato in China.
