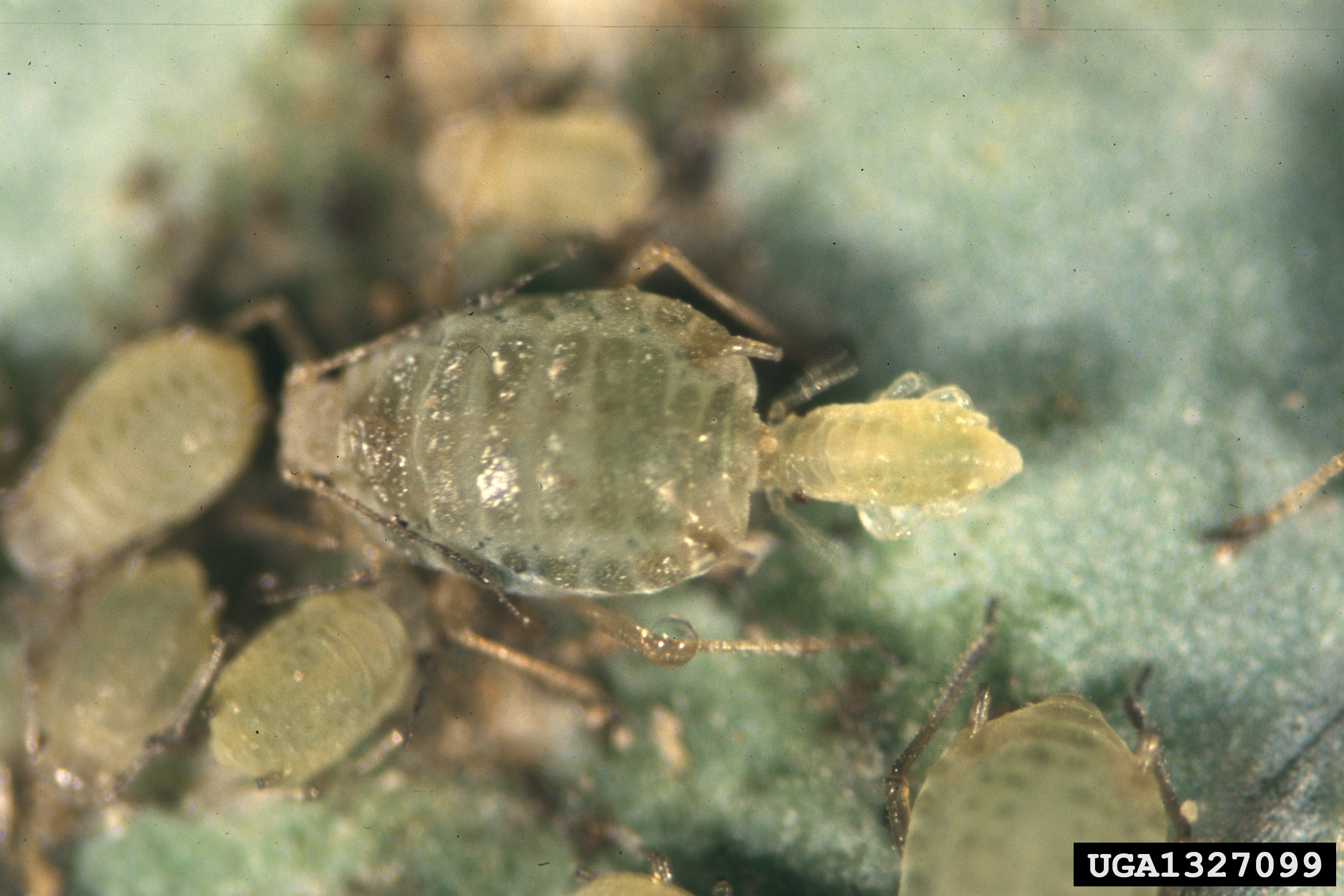
- Lipaphis erysimi

Scientific classification
- Kingdom: Animalia
- Phylum: Arthropoda
- Clade: Pancrustacea
- Class: Insecta
- Order: Hemiptera
- Suborder: Sternorrhyncha
- Family: Aphididae
- Tribe: Macrosiphini
- Genus: Lipaphis; Mordvilko, 1928

Type species
- Aphis erysimi Kaltenbach, 1843

= Lipaphis =

Genus of true bugs

Lipaphis is a genus of aphids of the family Aphididae.

Species include:

- Lipaphis alliariae F.P. Muller, 1952
- Lipaphis berteroaella Mamontova, 1979
- Lipaphis cochleariae Jacob, 1956
- Lipaphis erysimi (Kaltenbach, 1843)
- Lipaphis fritzmuelleri Börner, 1950
- Lipaphis lepidii (Nevsky, 1929)
- Lipaphis pseudobrassicae
- Lipaphis rossi Börner, 1939
- Lipaphis ruderalis Börner, 1939
- Lipaphis sisymbrii Bozhko, 1976
- Lipaphis turritella (Wahlgren, 1938)
