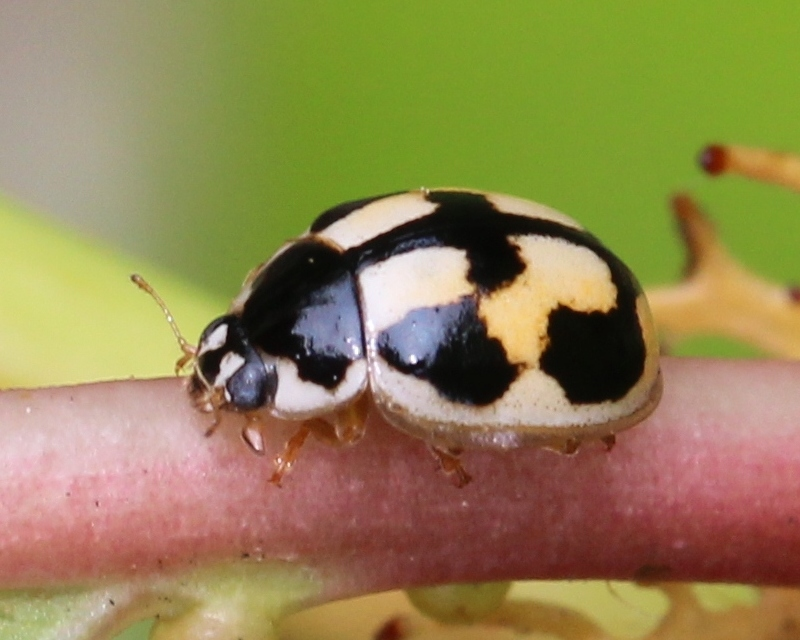

Scientific classification
- Kingdom: Animalia
- Phylum: Arthropoda
- Clade: Pancrustacea
- Class: Insecta
- Order: Coleoptera
- Suborder: Polyphaga
- Infraorder: Cucujiformia
- Family: Coccinellidae
- Genus: Propylea
- Species: P. japonica

Binomial name
- Propylea japonica (Thunberg, 1781)

Synonyms
- Coccinella japonica Thunberg, 1781; Coccinella dentata Thunberg, 1781; Coccinella tetraspilota Hope, 1843; Harmonia dionea Mulsant, 1856; Harmonia ambitiosa Mulsant, 1866

= Propylea japonica =

Species of beetle

Propylea japonica is a species of beetle of the family Coccinellidae. It is found in Vietnam, Laos, China, Japan, Korea and possibly north-eastern India.

== Description ==
Adults reach a length of about 3–4.7 mm (0.12–0.19 in). They are creamy yellow to yellow with black maculae on the pronotum and elytra.

== Life history ==
They have been recorded preying on various aphids.
