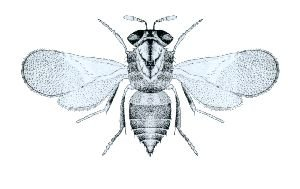
- Aphelinus mali

Scientific classification
- Kingdom: Animalia
- Phylum: Arthropoda
- Class: Insecta
- Order: Hymenoptera
- Family: Aphelinidae
- Tribe: Aphelinini
- Genus: Aphelinus; Dalman, 1820

Type species
- Aphelinus abdominalis (Dalman, 1820)

= Aphelinus =

Genus of wasps

Aphelinus is a genus of parasitoid wasps. Several species in the genus (including A. albipodus, A. asychis and A. varipes) parasitize agricultural pests, such as the soybean aphid (Aphis glycines) or the Russian wheat aphid (Diuraphis noxia).

About 100 species have been described.

== Partial species list ==
- Aphelinus abdominalis Dalman
- Aphelinus albipodus Hayat & Fatima
- Aphelinus asychis Walker
- Aphelinus certus Yasnosh
- Aphelinus chaonia Walker
- Aphelinus flaviventris Kurdjumov
- Aphelinus humilis Mercet
- Aphelinus lapisligni Howard
- Aphelinus mali (Haldeman)
- Aphelinus semiflavus Howard
- Aphelinus thomsoni Graham
- Aphelinus varipes (Foerster)
