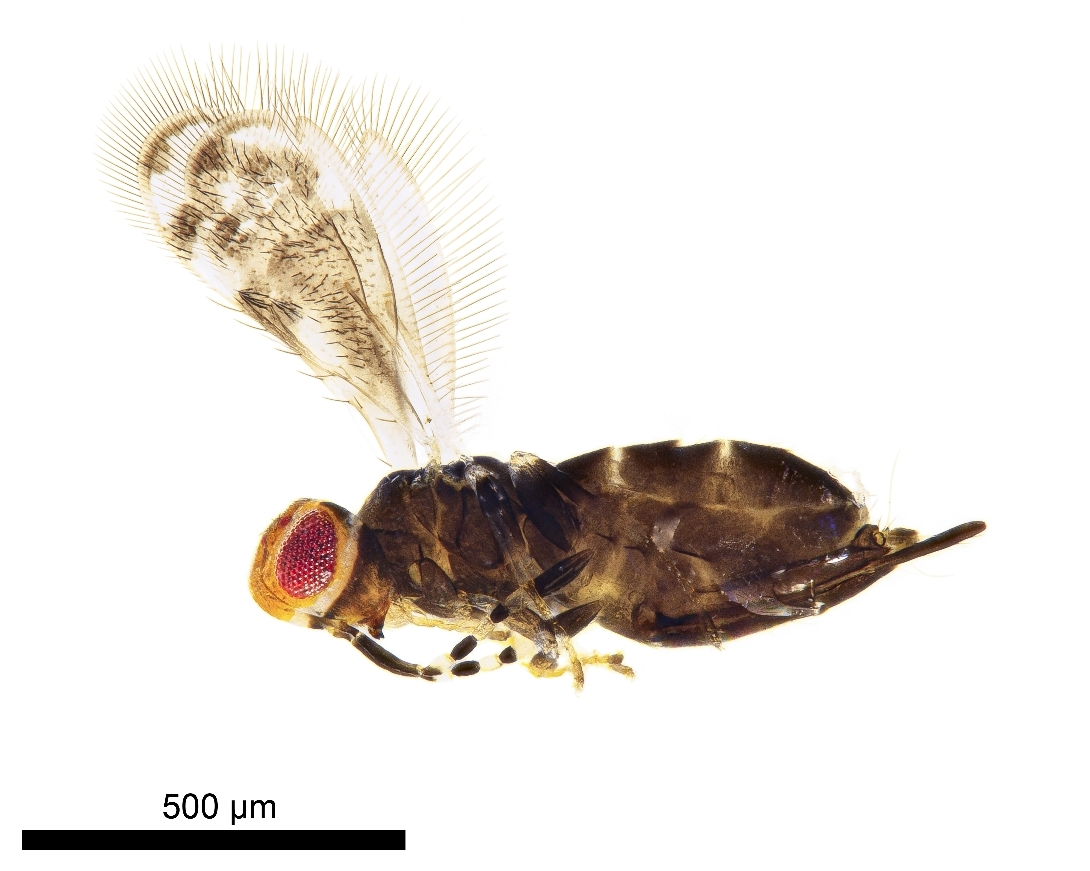
- Female Ablerus atomon

Scientific classification
- Kingdom: Animalia
- Phylum: Arthropoda
- Clade: Pancrustacea
- Class: Insecta
- Order: Hymenoptera
- Family: Azotidae; Nikolskaya & Yasnosh, 1966
- Genus: Ablerus; Howard, 1894

Type species
- Centrodora clisiocampae Ashmead, 1894

Species
- See text

Synonyms
- Azotus Howard 1898; Dimacrocerus Brethes 1914; Myocnemella Girault, 1913

= Ablerus =

Genus of chalcid wasps

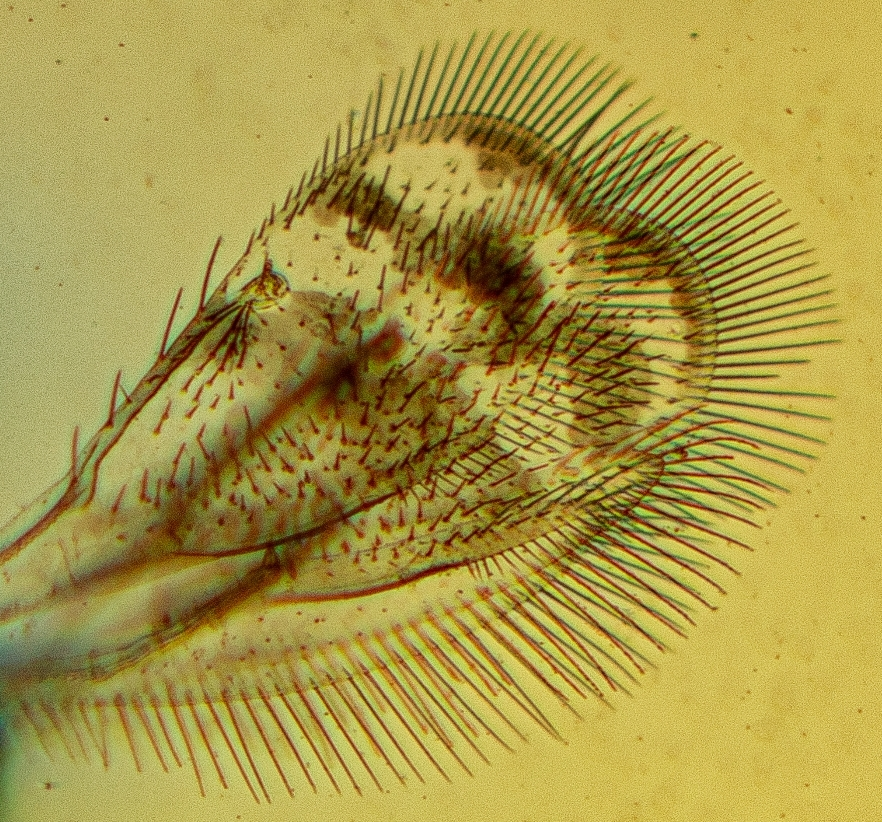
Female Ablerus atomon, wing detail

Ablerus is the only genus in the family Azotidae (in Superfamily Chalcidoidea). The genus was created by the American entomologist Leland Ossian Howard in 1894 for the species named in that year by William Harris Ashmead as Centrodora clisiocampae. The genus Azotus was synonymized with Ablerus by Alexandre Arsène Girault in 1913 and Hayat synonymized Myocnemella with Ablerus in 1994, leaving Ablerus as the sole genus within the subfamily Azotinae (in family Aphelinidae). Azotinae was elevated in rank in 2013 to become the monotypic family Azotidae.

These tiny wasps are normally hyperparasitoids and are associated with the Aleyrodidae and Coccoidea, particularly Diaspididae, as well as the eggs of a variety of other insects. Overall there are over 90 species of Ablerus.

== Species ==
These species belong to the genus Ablerus:

- Ablerus aegypticus Abd-Rabou, 2014
- Ablerus albicaput Girault, 1924
- Ablerus aleuroides (Husain & Agarwal, 1982)
- Ablerus aligarhensis (Khan & Shafee, 1976)
- Ablerus amarantus Girault, 1932
- Ablerus americanus Girault, 1916
- Ablerus aonidiellae Hayat, 1974
- Ablerus arboris Girault, 1932
- Ablerus argentiscapus Girault, 1932
- Ablerus atomon (Walker, 1847)
- Ablerus baeusoides Girault, 1915
- Ablerus beenleighi Girault, 1926
- Ablerus bharathius (Subba Rao, 1984)
- Ablerus bicinctipes Girault, 1932
- Ablerus bidentatus Girault, 1913
- Ablerus bifasciatus (Girault, 1913)
- Ablerus biguttatibiae Girault, 1924
- Ablerus byroni Kresslein, Avendaño & Herrera, 2024
- Ablerus capensis (Howard, 1907)
- Ablerus celsus (Walker, 1839)
- Ablerus chionaspidis (Howard, 1914)
- Ablerus chrysomphali (Ghesquiere, 1960)
- Ablerus ciliatus De Santis, 1948
- Ablerus clisiocampae (Ashmead, 1894)
- Ablerus connectens Silvestri, 1927
- Ablerus crassus (De Santis, 1974)
- Ablerus delhiensis (Lal, 1938)
- Ablerus diana Girault, 1920
- Ablerus dozieri (Darling & Johnson, 1984)
- Ablerus elegantissimus Girault, 1913
- Ablerus elegantulus (Silvestri, 1915)
- Ablerus emersoni Girault, 1917
- Ablerus fasciarius Wang, Huang & Polaszek, 2016
- Ablerus gargarae Hayat, 1998
- Ablerus gratus Girault, 1929
- Ablerus grotiusi Girault, 1913
- Ablerus hastatus Girault, 1932
- Ablerus howardii Girault, 1915
- Ablerus hyalinus Girault, 1913
- Ablerus impunctatipennis Girault, 1917
- Ablerus inquirenda Silvestri, 1927
- Ablerus lepidus (De Santis, 1974)
- Ablerus leucopidis Blanchard, 1942
- Ablerus longfellowi Girault, 1913
- Ablerus macchiae (Annecke & Insley, 1970)
- Ablerus macilentus (De Santis, 1974)
- Ablerus macrochaeta Silvestri, 1927
- Ablerus magistrettii Blanchard, 1942
- Ablerus miricilia Girault, 1929
- Ablerus molestus Blanchard, 1936
- Ablerus nelsoni Girault, 1921
- Ablerus novicornis Girault, 1931
- Ablerus nympha Girault, 1913
- Ablerus palauensis Doutt, 1951
- Ablerus pan Girault, 1913
- Ablerus perfuscipennis De Santis, 1954
- Ablerus perspeciosus Girault, 1916
- Ablerus peruvianus Girault, 1916
- Ablerus piceipes Girault, 1913
- Ablerus pinifoliae (Mercet, 1912)
- Ablerus pius Girault, 1929
- Ablerus plesius (Annecke & Insley, 1970)
- Ablerus plinii Girault, 1929
- Ablerus poincarei Girault, 1913
- Ablerus promacchiae Viggiani & Ren, 1993
- Ablerus pulcherrimus (Mercet, 1922)
- Ablerus pulchriceps Zehntner, 1899
- Ablerus pullicornis Girault, 1931
- Ablerus pumilus Annecke & Insley, 1970
- Ablerus punctatus Girault, 1921
- Ablerus rhea Girault, 1929
- Ablerus romae Girault, 1932
- Ablerus saintpierrei Girault, 1913
- Ablerus separaspidis (Annecke & Insley, 1970)
- Ablerus sidneyi Girault, 1932
- Ablerus similis (De Santis, 1948)
- Ablerus socratis Girault, 1931
- Ablerus socrus Girault, 1915
- Ablerus speciosus Girault, 1913
- Ablerus stylatus (Mercet, 1927)
- Ablerus totifuscipennis Girault, 1929
- Ablerus unnotipennis Girault, 1915
- Ablerus venustulus Girault, 1915
- Ablerus williamsi (Annecke & Insley, 1970)

== See also ==
- List of organisms named after famous people (born before 1800)
- List of organisms named after famous people (born 1800–1899)
