= Eriaporinae =

Scientific classification
- Kingdom: Animalia
- Phylum: Arthropoda
- Class: Insecta
- Order: Hymenoptera
- Family: Pirenidae
- Subfamily: Eriaporinae; Ghesquiere, 1955

Subfamily of wasps

Eriaporinae is a subfamily of chalcid wasps in the order Hymenoptera, family Pirenidae. There are 2 genera and 6 described species in Eriaporinae.

Eriaporinae was formerly considered a subfamily of the family Aphelinidae.

== Genera ==
- Eunotiscus Compere, 1928
- Promuscidea Girault, 1917
