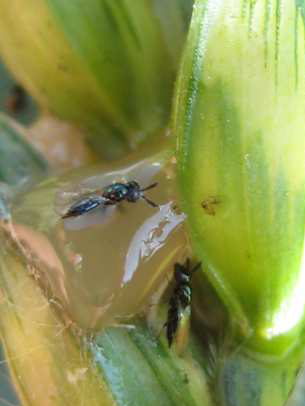

Scientific classification
- Domain: Eukaryota
- Kingdom: Animalia
- Phylum: Arthropoda
- Class: Insecta
- Order: Hymenoptera
- Family: Pirenidae
- Subfamily: Pireninae
- Genus: Macroglenes; Westwood, 1832

= Macroglenes =

Genus of wasps

Macroglenes is a genus of chalcidoid wasps in the family Pirenidae (formerly in Pteromalidae). There are at least 20 described species in Macroglenes.

== Species ==
These 22 species belong to the genus Macroglenes:

- Macroglenes bouceki (Graham, 1969)^{c g}
- Macroglenes brevicornis (Nees, 1834)^{c g}
- Macroglenes caudatus Mitroiu, 2010^{g}
- Macroglenes chalybeus (Haliday, 1833)^{c g}
- Macroglenes clypeatus (Girault, 1925)^{c g}
- Macroglenes compressus (Forster, 1841)^{g}
- Macroglenes congener (Girault, 1925)^{c g}
- Macroglenes conjungens (Graham, 1969)^{c g}
- Macroglenes decipiens (Graham, 1969)^{g}
- Macroglenes eximius (Haliday, 1833)^{c g}
- Macroglenes gramineus (Haliday, 1833)^{c g}
- Macroglenes herbaceus (Graham, 1969)^{c g}
- Macroglenes ipswichi (Girault, 1925)^{c g}
- Macroglenes marylandicus (Girault, 1916)^{c g}
- Macroglenes microcerus Haliday, 1844^{c g}
- Macroglenes nigroclypeatus Amerling & Kirchner, 1860^{c g}
- Macroglenes paludum (Graham, 1969)^{c g}
- Macroglenes penetrans (Kirby, 1800)^{c g}
- Macroglenes sivani Narendran & Sureshan, 2004^{c g}
- Macroglenes varicornis (Haliday, 1833)^{c g}
- Macroglenes yuasai Ishii^{g}
- Macroglenes zdeneki Mitroiu, 2010^{g}

Data sources: i = ITIS, c = Catalogue of Life, g = GBIF, b = Bugguide.net
