= Bardylis (wasp) =

Scientific classification
- Domain: Eukaryota
- Kingdom: Animalia
- Phylum: Arthropoda
- Class: Insecta
- Order: Hymenoptera
- Family: Aphelinidae
- Subfamily: Coccophaginae
- Genus: Bardylis; Howard, 1907

Type species
- Bardylis australiensis Howard, 1907

Species
- Bardylis australis Girault, 1917; Bardylis australiensis Howard, 1907; Bardylis copernici (Girault, 1936); Bardylis magnus Girault, 1928; Bardylis mea (Girault, 1934); Bardylis metallicus (Girault, 1932); Bardylis multiguttatus (Girault, 1915); Bardylis shillingsworthi (Girault, 1920); Bardylis silvensis Girault, 1928

Synonyms
- Metacasca Girault, 1934; Pteroptrixella Girault, 1932

Genus of wasps

Bardylis is a small genus of chalcid wasps belonging to the family Aphelinidae. There are presently 9 described species.
