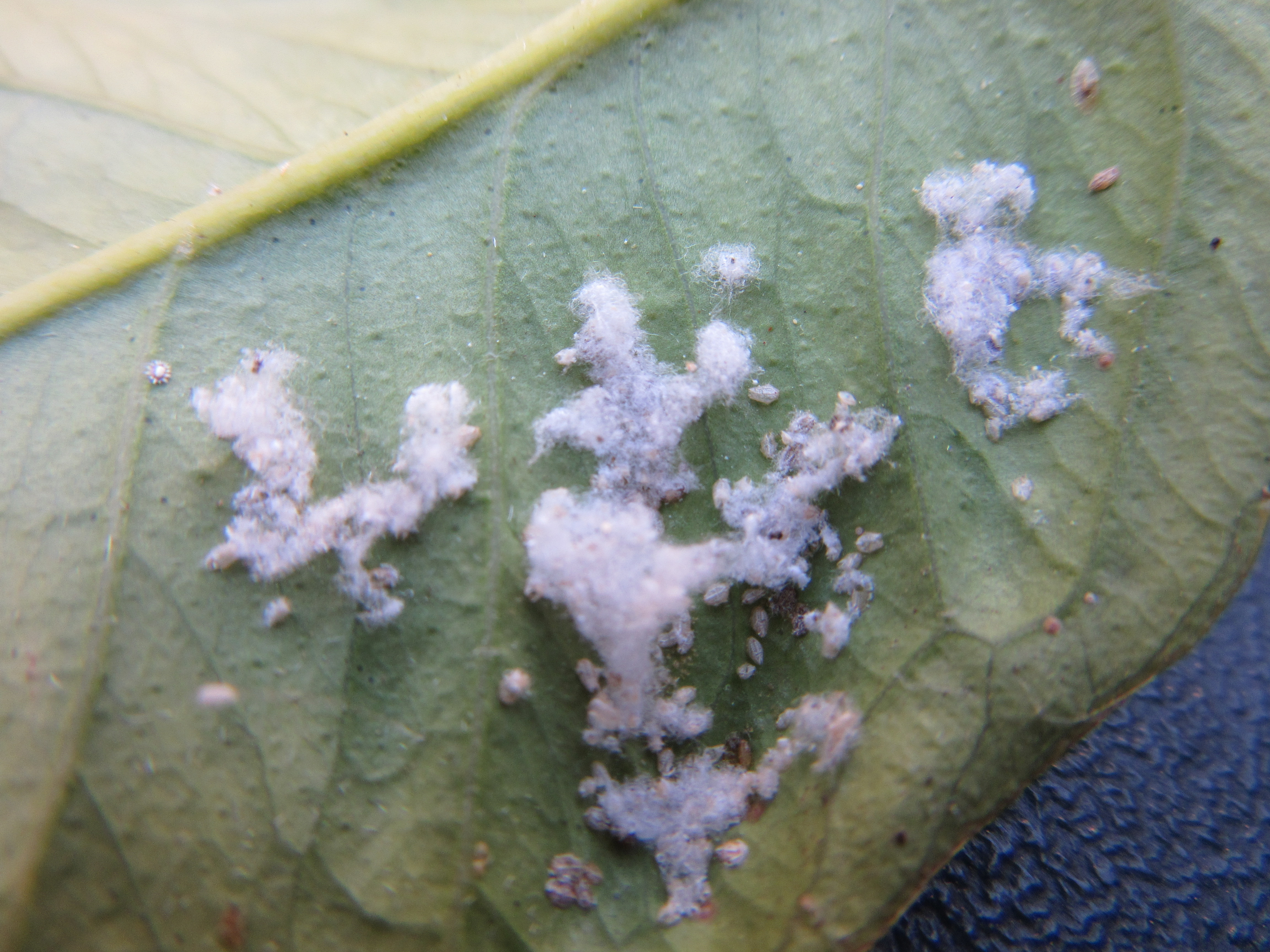
- Aleurothrixus floccosus

Scientific classification
- Domain: Eukaryota
- Kingdom: Animalia
- Phylum: Arthropoda
- Class: Insecta
- Order: Hemiptera
- Suborder: Sternorrhyncha
- Family: Aleyrodidae
- Genus: Aleurothrixus; Quaintance & Baker

= Aleurothrixus =

Genus of true bugs

Aleurothrixus is a genus of whiteflies in the family Aleyrodidae.

== Species ==
- Aleurothrixus aepim (Goeldi, 1886)
- Aleurothrixus aguiari Costa Lima, 1942
- Aleurothrixus antidesmae Takahashi, 1933
- Aleurothrixus bondari Costa Lima, 1942
- Aleurothrixus chivelensis Sampson & Drews, 1941
- Aleurothrixus floccosus (Maskell, 1896) (woolly whitefly)
- Aleurothrixus guareae Costa Lima, 1942
- Aleurothrixus guimaraesi Costa Lima, 1942
- Aleurothrixus interrogationis (Bemis, 1904)
- Aleurothrixus lucumai Costa Lima, 1942
- Aleurothrixus miconiae Hempel, 1922
- Aleurothrixus myrtacei Bondar, 1923
- Aleurothrixus myrtifolii Bondar, 1923
- Aleurothrixus ondinae Bondar, 1923
- Aleurothrixus porteri Quaintance & Baker, 1916
- Aleurothrixus proximans Bondar, 1923
- Aleurothrixus silvestris Corbett, 1935
- Aleurothrixus similis Sampson & Drews, 1941
- Aleurothrixus smilaceti Takahashi, 1934
- Aleurothrixus solani Bondar, 1923
