= Ablerus unnotipennis =

Scientific classification
- Kingdom: Animalia
- Phylum: Arthropoda
- Clade: Pancrustacea
- Class: Insecta
- Order: Hymenoptera
- Family: Azotidae
- Genus: Ablerus
- Species: A. unnotipennis

Binomial name
- Ablerus unnotipennis Girault, 1915

Species of wasp

Ablerus unnotipennis is a species of chalcid wasp in the family Azotidae. It is in Australia.
