= Allomymar =

Scientific classification
- Domain: Eukaryota
- Kingdom: Animalia
- Phylum: Arthropoda
- Class: Insecta
- Order: Hymenoptera
- Family: Aphelinidae
- Genus: Allomymar; Kieffer, 1913
- Species: A. taitae

Binomial name
- Allomymar taitae Keiffer, 1913

Genus of wasps

Allomymar is a little-known monotypic genus of chalcid wasps belonging to the family Aphelinidae. The only species within the genus is Allomymar taitae and it is possible that Allomymar is synonymous with Encarsia.
