= Botryoideclava =

Scientific classification
- Kingdom: Animalia
- Phylum: Arthropoda
- Clade: Pancrustacea
- Class: Insecta
- Order: Hymenoptera
- Family: Aphelinidae
- Subfamily: Aphelininae
- Genus: Botryoideclava; Subba Rao, 1980

Type species
- Botryoideclava bharatiya Subba Rao, 1980

Genus of wasps

Botryoideclava is a small genus of chalcid wasps belonging to the family Aphelinidae. Both known species are found in India.

== Partial species list ==
- Botryoideclava bharatiya Subba Rao
- Botryoideclava thailandica Hayat, 1994
