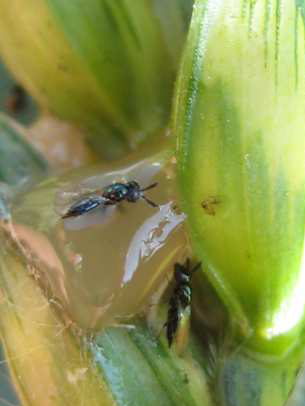
- Macroglenes

Scientific classification
- Kingdom: Animalia
- Phylum: Arthropoda
- Clade: Pancrustacea
- Class: Insecta
- Order: Hymenoptera
- Superfamily: Chalcidoidea
- Family: Pirenidae; Haliday, 1844

= Pirenidae =

Family of wasps

Pirenidae is a family of chalcidoid wasps with a cosmopolitan distribution. It was formerly treated as a subfamily within the family Pteromalidae but is now recognized as a distinct family. Members of the family are parasitioid or hyperparasitoid with hosts including Braconidae, Cecidomyiidae, and Coccoidea.

== Description ==
Bodies are 1-2mm long and weakly sclerotized and superficially sculptured. Colors include yellowish, brown, black, and blue metallic.Antenna have a reduced number of flagellomeres.

== Genera ==
The subfamilies and genera of Pirenidae include the following:

- Subfamily Cecidellinae
  - Cecidellis
- Subfamily Eriaporinae
  - Eunotiscus
  - Promuscidea
- Subfamily Euryischiinae
  - Euryischia
  - Euryischomyia
  - Myiocnema
- Subfamily Pireninae
  - Ecrizotomorpha
  - Keesia
  - Lasallea
  - Macroglenes
  - Papuaglenes
  - Petipirene
  - Pirene
  - Velepirene
  - Watshamia
  - Zebe
- Subfamily Tridyminae
  - Calyconotiscus
  - Ecrizotes
  - Epiterobia
  - Gastrancistrus
  - Melancistrus
  - Oxyglypta
  - Premiscogaster
  - Sirovena
  - Spathopus
  - Spinancistrus
  - Tridymus
