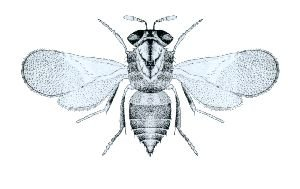

Scientific classification
- Domain: Eukaryota
- Kingdom: Animalia
- Phylum: Arthropoda
- Class: Insecta
- Order: Hymenoptera
- Family: Aphelinidae
- Genus: Aphelinus
- Species: A. mali

Binomial name
- Aphelinus mali Haldeman, 1851

= Aphelinus mali =

Species of wasp

Aphelinus mali is a parasitoid wasp that exploits the woolly apple aphid (Eriosoma lanigerum), a pest of apple trees. It is native to the northeastern United States but has been introduced to other parts of the world as a biological pest control agent.

== Description ==
The adult A. mali is a tiny black wasp slightly smaller than its woolly aphid host. Its transparent membranous wings are longer than its abdomen and fold flat along its back. Although it can fly, it prefers to walk and jump, and often conceals itself under leaves. The larvae and pupae remain hidden inside the host; the larvae are yellow with red eyes, and the pupae are black.

== Distribution ==
This parasitoid is a parasite of aphids, particularly woolly aphids and is native to the northeastern parts of the United States. It was introduced in 1928 to the orchards of the Pacific Northwest in the region of Hood River and spread naturally. It has since been introduced to many other parts of the world with the aim of keeping aphids under control.

== Life cycle ==
The adult female A. mali emerges from diapause in the spring. It inserts its ovipositor into the underside of a woolly aphid and lays an egg, which hatches in about three days. The adult may feed on any fluid that oozes from the puncture wound. The larva takes ten to twelve days to develop before pupating inside the body of its host. When ready to emerge, the adult chews its way out through the upper surface of the aphid, leaving a neat round hole. The whole life cycle takes 20 to 25 days and there may be six or seven generations during the season. In the fall, larvae and pupae enter diapause and overwinter in the blackened mummified bodies of their hosts.

== Use in pest control ==
Introduced from its native region to other apple growing areas, A. mali was one of the earliest examples of controlling pests biologically. It works best in conjunction with other generalist predators such as lady beetles, lacewings, the larvae of hoverflies and the plant bug Deraeocoris brevis, and is negatively impacted by the use of chemical pesticides.
