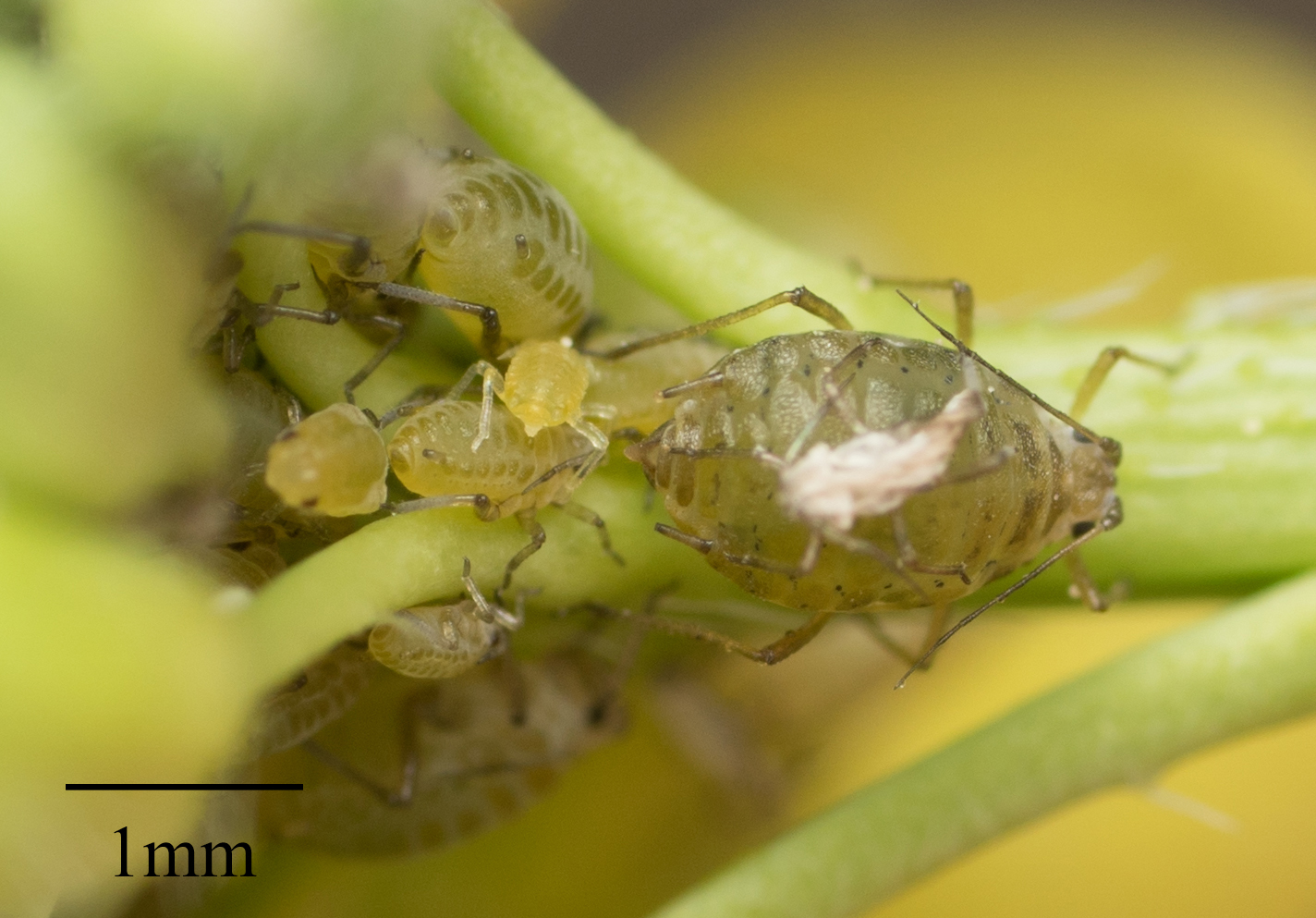

Scientific classification
- Kingdom: Animalia
- Phylum: Arthropoda
- Clade: Pancrustacea
- Class: Insecta
- Order: Hemiptera
- Suborder: Sternorrhyncha
- Family: Aphididae
- Genus: Lipaphis
- Species: L. pseudobrassicae

Binomial name
- Lipaphis pseudobrassicae Davis, 1914

= Lipaphis pseudobrassicae =

Species of true bug

Lipaphis pseudobrassicae is an aphid of the family Aphididae. Its common name is turnip aphid. The aphid can feed on multiple Brassica species, including Brassica juncea, Brassica campestris, as well as wild hosts such as Rorippa indica. Aphids from crop plants are often heavier and grow faster.
