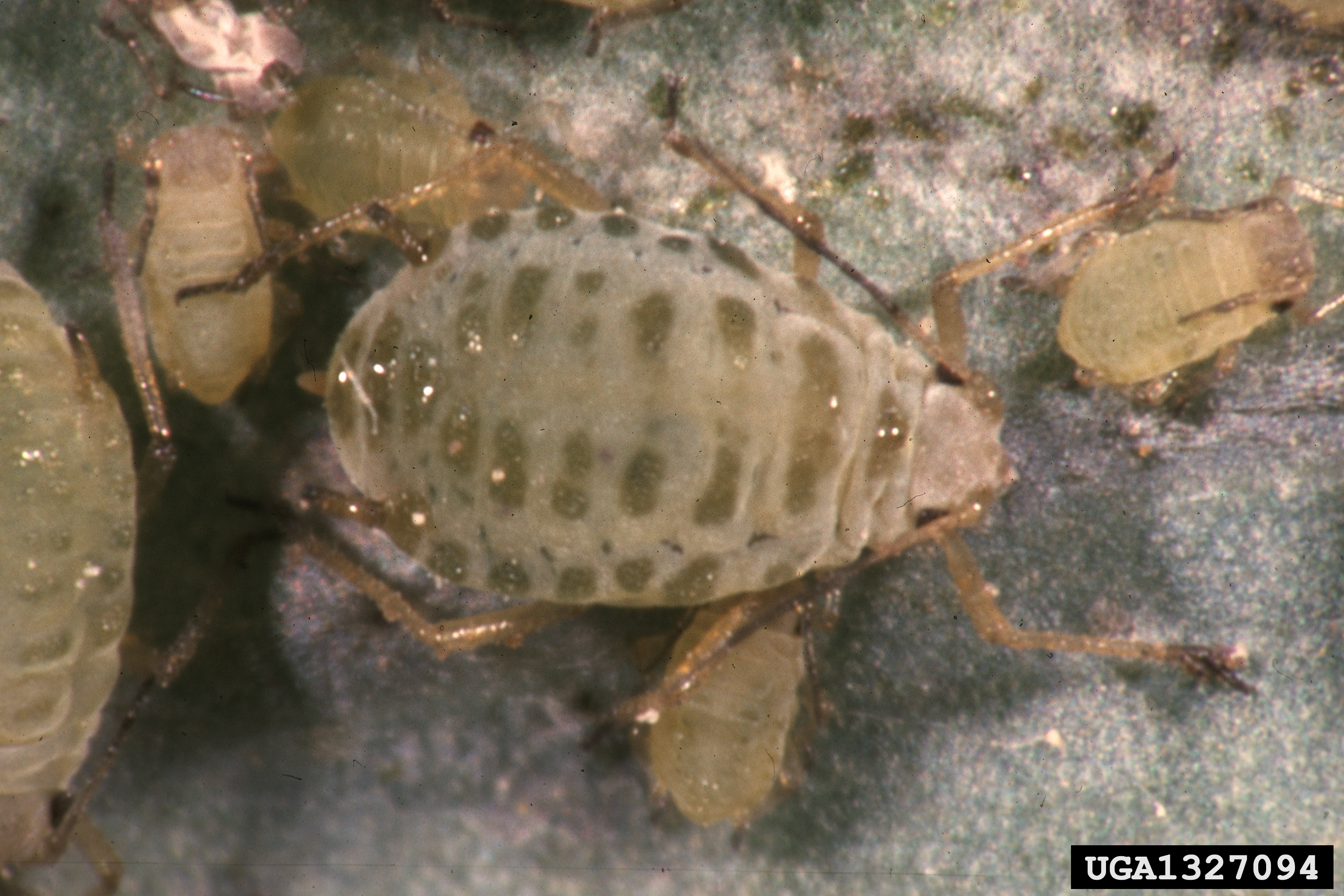

Scientific classification
- Kingdom: Animalia
- Phylum: Arthropoda
- Clade: Pancrustacea
- Class: Insecta
- Order: Hemiptera
- Suborder: Sternorrhyncha
- Family: Aphididae
- Genus: Lipaphis
- Species: L. erysimi

Binomial name
- Lipaphis erysimi (Kaltenbach, 1843)

Synonyms
- Aphis erysimi Kaltenbach, 1843

= Lipaphis erysimi =

Species of true bug

Lipaphis erysimi is a species of aphid of the family Aphididae. Its common names include mustard aphid and turnip aphid. It is found in most temperate and tropical areas of the world and feeds only on cruciferous plants. The insects are almost exclusively female and are very prolific, with wingless females producing around one hundred young during a lifespan of a few weeks.

== Description ==
The wingless female is pale green or whitish green with two rows of dark bands on the thorax and abdomen which unite into a single band near the tip of the abdomen. The antennae are dark, the legs are pale with dark joints and the cornicles are pale with dark tips. The body is faintly dusted with a white powder. It is between 1.4 and 2.4 mm (0.06 and 0.09 in) in length. The winged female is a similar size and has a black head and thorax and a pale green abdomen with black bands near the tip and black patches on the sides. The antennae and legs are dark, and the cornicles are black at the base and yellowish towards the tips. Wingless males have occasionally been seen; these are smaller than the females and olive-green to brownish in colour.

== Distribution and habitat ==
Originally a European species, the turnip aphid is now found in most parts of the world in tropical and temperate locations. Host plants include cabbage, cauliflower, broccoli, Brussels sprouts, kale, kohlrabi, radish and turnip, as well as shepherd's purse, wild mustard and other cruciferous weeds.

== Life cycle ==
The turnip aphid is almost entirely viviparous, although eggs have occasionally been seen. It is extremely prolific and in warm places such as Texas, a maximum of thirty-five generations per year have been recorded. The wingless females produce up to six offspring per day over a period of twenty to forty days, a total of eighty to one hundred young. Winged females are able to disperse to other plants, but produce fewer offspring.

== Ecology ==
This aphid is found on older leaves of brassica plants and on the roots. It is one of several species of aphid to feed on brassicas; the cabbage aphid (Brevicoryne brassicae) feeds only on these plants, while the green peach aphid is found on many crops and plants including brassicas. The cabbage aphid can be distinguished by its waxy coating and its dense colonies on young growth, while the green peach aphid is dispersed around the brassica plant, occurring mainly on the older leaves of its host.

The species can be a vector of at least ten plant viruses including cabbage black ringspot virus, radish mosaic virus, cauliflower mosaic virus and turnip mosaic virus.
