= Proaphelinoides =

Scientific classification
- Kingdom: Animalia
- Phylum: Arthropoda
- Class: Insecta
- Order: Hymenoptera
- Family: Aphelinidae
- Genus: Proaphelinoides; Girault, 1917

Synonyms
- Bestiola Nikolskaya, 1963

Genus of wasps

Proaphelinoides is a genus of wasps belonging to the family Aphelinidae.

The species of this genus are found in Australia.

Species:

- Proaphelinoides anomalus Hayat, 1985
- Proaphelinoides assamensis
- Proaphelinoides australis Girault, 1922
- Proaphelinoides bendovi Tachikawa, 1984
- Proaphelinoides elongatiformis Girault, 1917
