= Aleurothrixus floccosus =

Scientific classification
- Kingdom: Animalia
- Phylum: Arthropoda
- Class: Insecta
- Order: Hemiptera
- Suborder: Sternorrhyncha
- Family: Aleyrodidae
- Genus: Aleurothrixus
- Species: A. floccosus

Binomial name
- Aleurothrixus floccosus (Maskell, 1896)

Species of true bug

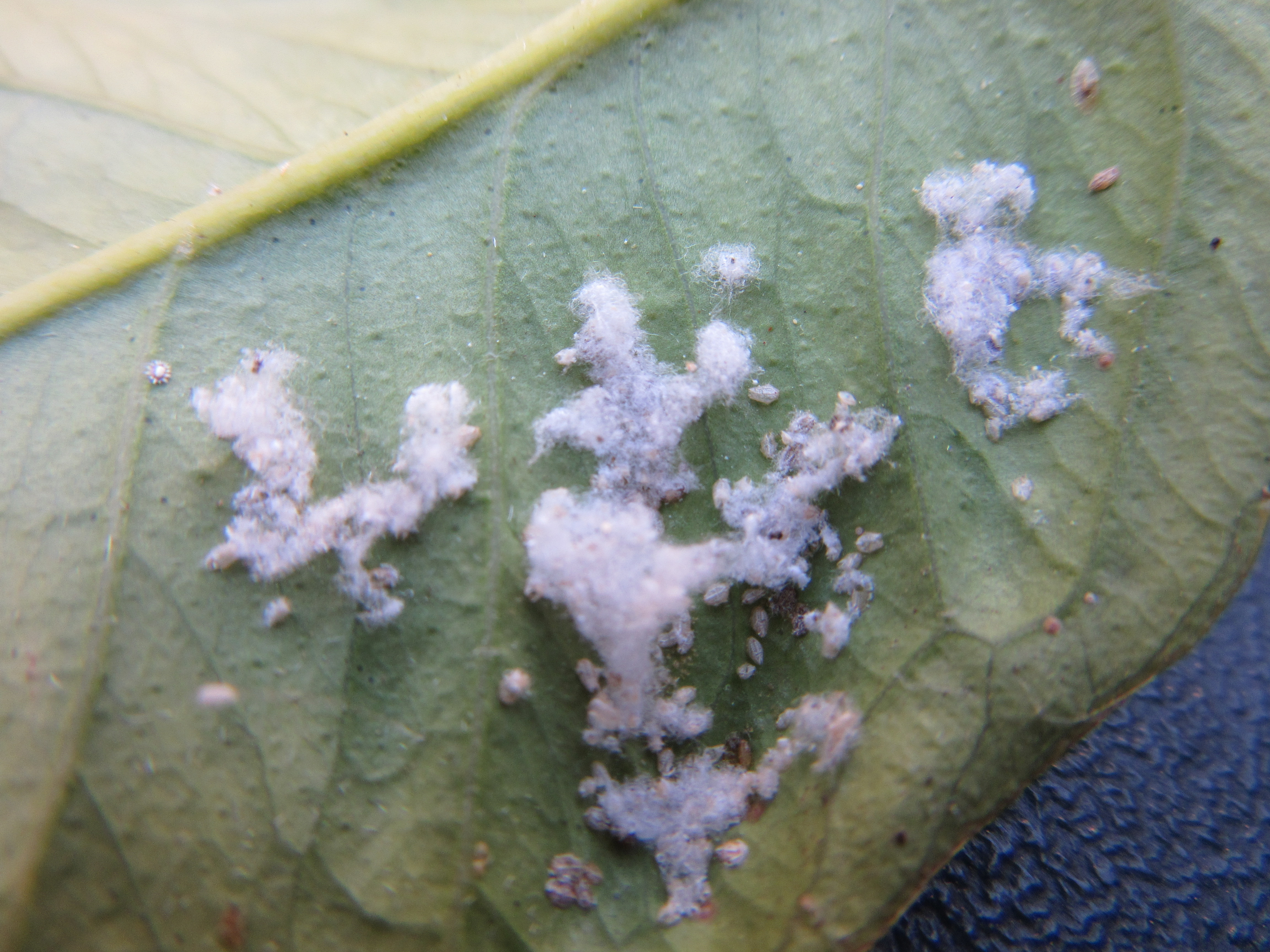
Aleurothrixus floccosus on lemon leaf

Aleurothrixus floccosus, the woolly whitefly, is a species of whitefly in the family Aleyrodidae. Probably native to the Neotropics; it is found in the Nearctic, Africa, India and Europe.

This widespread species is a pest of many species of cultivated plants.
