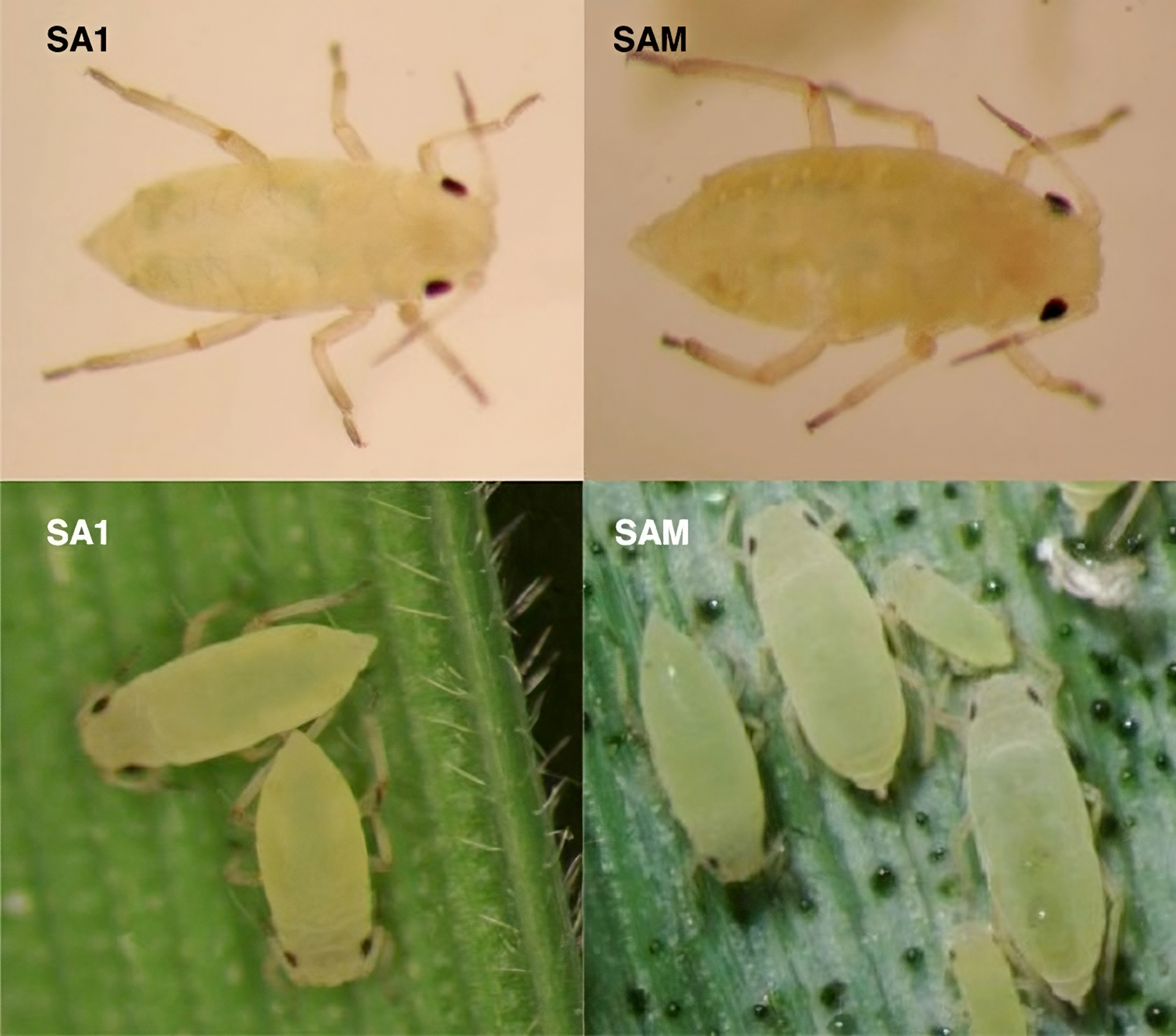

Scientific classification
- Kingdom: Animalia
- Phylum: Arthropoda
- Class: Insecta
- Order: Hemiptera
- Suborder: Sternorrhyncha
- Family: Aphididae
- Genus: Diuraphis
- Species: D. noxia

Binomial name
- Diuraphis noxia (Mordvilko in Kurdjumov, 1913)

Synonyms
- Brachycolus mublei Zhang & Chen, 1999; Brachycolus noxius Mordvilko in Kurdjumov, 1913; Cavahyalopterus noxius (Mordvilko, 1913); Cuernacava noxius (Mordvilko, 1913); Holcaphis noxius (Mordvilko, 1913)

= Russian wheat aphid =

Species of true bug

The Russian wheat aphid (Diuraphis noxia) is an aphid that can cause significant losses in cereal crops. The species was introduced to the United States in 1986 and is considered an invasive species there. This aphid is pale green and up to 2 mm long. Cornicles are very short, rounded, and appear to be lacking. There is an appendage above the cauda giving the aphid the appearance of having two tails. The saliva of this aphid is toxic to the plant and causes whitish striping on cereal leaves. Feeding by this aphid will also cause the flag leaf to turn white and curl around the head causing incomplete head emergence. Its host plants are cereal grain crops including wheat and barley and to a lesser extent, wild grasses such as wheatgrasses, brome-grasses, ryegrasses and anything in the grass family.

The Russian wheat aphid is native to southwestern parts of Asia. It was introduced to many countries in Europe and Africa. It was first found in the U.S. in 1986 in Texas. The species was probably transmitted through wheat imports.

== Pest ==
Russian wheat aphids are one of the most significant pests on wheat in the world. It was first identified as a pest in Crimea in 1901. The origin of D. noxia can be traced back to Eurasia where it is a pest on cereals. Aside from direct damage to crops, they are also vectors for barley yellow dwarf, barley mosaic and sugarcane mosaic viruses.

After its detection in the US in 1986, the Russian wheat aphid quickly became a major pest of wheat and barley. Researchers established D. noxia–resistant strains of wheat by 1996, but genotypes of aphids that were able to overcome these resistance strains began to appear in 2003.

D. noxia feeds on the host plant through the phloem. The result of being parasitized by aphids is damage through nutrient drainage, which develops into symptoms such as chlorosis, necrosis, wilting, stunting and other signs of growth impairment. The aphid further increases nutritional drainage of the host plant by augmenting essential amino acid content in the phloem sap by triggering a breakdown of proteins in the host plant.

=== Effect of aphid infestation ===
D. noxia has a variety of effects on the host plant and the subsequent products for which the plant is used. The host plant's response to an aphid infestation is a loss of turgor and reduced growth due to water imbalances as the aphid feed on phloem. The aphid also causes reduction in biomass of the whole plant. However, once the aphid is removed the plant quickly recovers absolute growth rate and has increased relative growth. As a result of previous infestation, the recovering plants are more efficient in carbon assimilation, resulting in increased relative growth rates and compensating for the leaf damage during aphid infestation.

Aphid infestation on wheat also affects the flour that is made from infested wheat plants. Aphid feeding in wheat results in qualitative and quantitative losses in flour yield. Flour derived from aphid infested wheat has a significantly reduced gliadin to glutenin ratio which reduces the bread-making quality of aphid-infested wheat plant flour. However, although parasitization does reduce the quality of flour for bread-making, the mixing time may still be within acceptable ranges to be usable.

==== Cold resistance ====
As D. noxia became an invasive species in North America, it is notable that they possess enough endurance to cold temperatures to survive through winter. Aphid populations can overwinter through temperatures between 0 and 5 degrees Celsius. However, temperatures below 10 degrees Celsius will lead to catastrophic decrease in population. In addition to survivability in sub-zero temperatures, the aphids are also capable of rapid cold hardiness (RCH) which allows an insect to develop protection against sudden sub-freezing temperatures. Moreover, aphids are capable of RCH without any cost to their reproductive capability.

== Management ==
=== Tolerance ===
A method to control D. noxia infestation of wheat and barley is through host control. Host control consists of raising crops that possess genes that may contribute to aphid resistance. Research has been conducted to identify the specific genes that can be attributed to aphid resistance and the information marked to assist in breeding aphid-resistant strains of wheat or barley. The genes that have been identified so far have been Dn1–Dn9 and Dnx. As these genes are marked for selective breeding, it may serve to manage the population of aphids.

=== Extermination ===
==== Biological control ====
Hopper et al.'s research into biological control is based on the non-pest status of D. noxia in Eurasia, its area of origin. It is possible that natural enemies in that area limit the abundance of the aphids, therefore preventing them from becoming pests. Based on the selection of natural enemies of D. noxia in Eurasia, the paper reports a survey of host specificity of different species of parasite from the genus Aphelinus. Although host specificity and range differ from species to species, Aphelinus hordei has a narrow range within aphids of genus Diuraphis that includes D. noxia. The behavior of females with respect to A. hordei oviposition orients the species' specificity towards D. noxia. Female A. hordei rarely approach aphids that are not of the D. noxia variety. Due to this host specificity, the paper suggests that biological control of D. noxia may be viable through A. hordei introduction into the west.

==== Chemical control ====
Tripotassium phosphate was studied as a resistance inducer on wheat plants against D. noxia. It may serve as a method to deal with the population of aphids that have overcome wheat's genetic resistance. The study indicated that potassium phosphate–treated plants from either a resistant strain or a non-resistant strain both had a decrease in feeding aphid numbers. Thus these data support treating wheat with potassium phosphate to induce tolerance against D. noxia.
