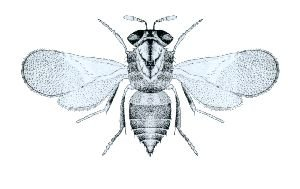
- Aphelinus mali

Scientific classification
- Kingdom: Animalia
- Phylum: Arthropoda
- Class: Insecta
- Order: Hymenoptera
- Superfamily: Chalcidoidea
- Family: Aphelinidae; Thomson, 1876

Subfamilies
- Aphelininae; Coccophaginae; Eretmocerinae; Eriaphytinae

Diversity
- 4 subfamilies c.34 genera c.1100 species

= Aphelinidae =

Aphelinidae Temporal range: Priabonian–Recent

Family of wasps

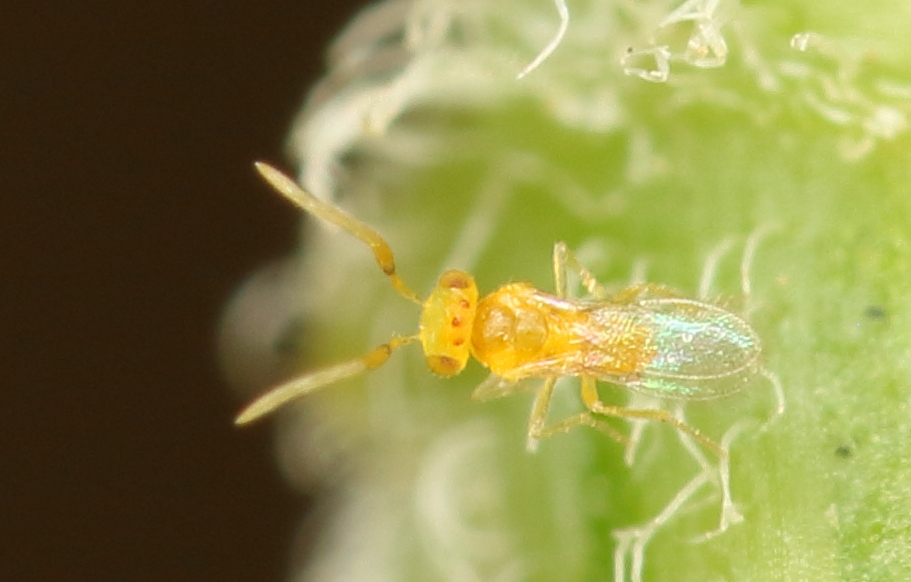
Eretmocerus sp.

The Aphelinidae are a moderate-sized family of tiny parasitic wasps, with about 1100 described species in some 34 genera. These minute insects are challenging to study, as they deteriorate rapidly after death unless extreme care is taken (e.g., preservation in ethanol), making identification of most museum specimens difficult. The larvae of the majority are primary parasitoids on Hemiptera, though other hosts are attacked, and details of the life history can be variable (e.g., some attack eggs, some attack pupae, and others are hyperparasites). Males and females may have different hosts and different life histories .

They are found throughout the world in virtually all habitats, and are extremely important as biological control agents. The oldest fossils are known from the Eocene aged Baltic Amber.

They are difficult to separate from other Chalcidoidea except by subtle features of the wing venation and other difficult characters, and the family was formerly paraphyletic, so the families Azotidae, Calesidae, and Eriaporidae were recently elevated in rank to families, from former subfamilies of Aphelinidae.

== Genera ==
- Allomymar
- Aphelinus
- Aphytis
- Bardylis
- Botryoideclava
- Centrodora
- Coccobius
- Coccophagoides
- Coccophagus
- Diaspiniphagus
- Dirphys
- Encarsia
- Eretmocerus
- Eriaphytis
- Eutrichosomella
- Hirtaphelinus
- Lounsburyia
- Marietta
- Marlattiella
- Mashimaro
- Metanthemus
- Neophytis
- Oenrobia
- Paraphytis
- Proaphelinoides
- Prophyscus
- Protaphelinus
- Pteroptrix
- Punkaphytis
- Saengella
- Samariola
- Timberlakiella
- Verekia
- Wallaceaphytis
