= Encarsia perniciosi =

Scientific classification
- Domain: Eukaryota
- Kingdom: Animalia
- Phylum: Arthropoda
- Class: Insecta
- Order: Hymenoptera
- Family: Aphelinidae
- Subfamily: Coccophaginae
- Genus: Encarsia
- Species: E. perniciosi

Binomial name
- Encarsia perniciosi (Tower, 1913)

Species of insect

Encarsia perniciosi is a tiny parasitic wasp, a parasitoid of the California red scale (Aonidiella aurantii) and the San Jose scale (Quadraspidiotus perniciosus) on citrus in California.

== Description ==
Encarsia perniciosi is a tiny dark-coloured wasp, rather smaller than Comperiella bifasciata, another parasitoid of scale insects. E. perniciosi is common near the coast in California, and used to be present in citrus groves inland until the introduction of Aphytis melinus. The two co-exist in coastal areas but not inland, a fact that has not yet been explained.

== Life cycle ==
Encarsia perniciosi is an endoparasite, the female inserting its ovipositor into a scale, either male or female, and laying an egg inside. It can use any scale stage but prefers to use second instars. The wasp larva matures rapidly and pupates inside the body of its host. On emerging from the pupa, it chews through the scale test, leaving behind a mummified second or third instar scale.

On the California red scale, this wasp is thelytokous, with female offspring being produced from unfertilised eggs. On the San Jose scale however, though some females reproduce by thelytoky, other strains are arrhenotokous, with males being produced from unfertilised eggs. The males are secondary parasitoids, developing inside other Encarsia larvae, usually female, or in the larvae of other species. Research in the laboratory shows that arrhenotokous males will not mate with thelytokous females. There have been reports in the literature of the arrhenotokous form becoming thelytokous when kept under constant conditions of temperature, but the researchers in this study did not find this to be the case, and maintained arrhenotokous strains for as many as 19 generations.
