= Aonidiella citrina =

Yellow scale

Scientific classification
- Kingdom: Animalia
- Phylum: Arthropoda
- Clade: Pancrustacea
- Class: Insecta
- Order: Hemiptera
- Suborder: Sternorrhyncha
- Family: Diaspididae
- Genus: Aonidiella
- Species: A. citrina

Binomial name
- Aonidiella citrina Coquillett, 1891

Species of true bug

Aonidiella citrina or yellow scale is an armored scale insect from the family Diaspididae. It feeds by sucking sap from plants in a number of plant families, but is mostly known for being a pest of citrus.

== Description ==
Armoured scales are so-called because they are covered by a hard, plate-like structure, the scale. The adult female yellow scale insect is concealed under a thin, pale circular scale through which its yellowish body colour can be seen. The female is legless and remains in the same location permanently, anchored to the surface. The male is a similar colour and has an elongate oval scale. The exuviae (shed nymphal skins) are located near the centre in the female scale but are near one end in the male insect. When the adult male emerges from under its scale after four moults, it has limbs and a single pair of wings and is able to fly rather weakly; it lives for only a few hours, and its sole purpose is to find and mate with a female.

== Life cycle ==
The adult female scale insect is viviparous, the eggs hatching internally, and produces up to 150 young at the rate of two or three per day. The first-stage larva is mobile and is known as a crawler; it emerges from under the mother's scale and disperses to other parts of the plant; it may be blown by the wind or transported elsewhere by animals and is the only mobile life stage except for the adult male. When it has found a depression or other suitable location, it pierce the host plant with its mouthparts and sucks sap. The female nymph moults twice as it develops while the male moults four times.

== Distribution ==
Yellow scale has a widespread distribution in Asia, the Mediterranean area, Africa and South America, and is a serious pest of citrus in the southern United States, China, Japan, India, Iran and Australia. When it first appeared in California it was thought to be a yellow variant of red scale (Aonidiella aurantii) because the two are so similar in morphology. However, later various microscopic differences between them were noticed. Yellow scale affects fewer host plants than does red scale, and it is more susceptible to insecticides and biological pest control.

== Damage ==
Yellow scale insects seldom feed on the woody parts of plants, concentrating on the leaves and fruits. It is a less serious pest of citrus than red scale because its effects are more cosmetic, and because it is easier to control. Heavy infestations of the insect can cause yellowing of the leaves, leaf fall, dieback of twigs and branches, or even tree death. Fruits may be disfigured and attain lower prices. In California, many populations of both red and yellow scale have become resistant to some of the most commonly used pesticides, but biological control using chalcid wasp parasitoids is very effective; Aphytis melinus and Aphytis lingnanensis are used in mild coastal areas and Comperiella bifasciata in inland areas such as the San Joaquin Valley.
