= Encarsia tricolor =

Scientific classification
- Kingdom: Animalia
- Phylum: Arthropoda
- Clade: Pancrustacea
- Class: Insecta
- Order: Hymenoptera
- Family: Aphelinidae
- Genus: Encarsia
- Species: E. tricolor

Binomial name
- Encarsia tricolor Foerster, 1878

Species of wasp

Encarsia tricolor is a wasp in the family Aphelinidae and a parasitoid of cabbage whitefly (Aleyrodes proletella).

== Description ==
Adult Encarsia tricolor lay eggs in whitefly nymphs, then develop as endoparasitoids inside the nymph, emerging as adult females in 18 to 23 days. Males develop only hyperparasitically in other whitefly parasitoids, including female Encarsia tricolor and Encarsia formosa. Immature E. tricolor overwinter inside of whitefly nymphs, completing their development and emerging in spring. Several generations may be completed each year.

E. tricolor is the primary parasitoid of Aleyrodes proletella, an important pest of brassica crops. While E. tricolor has been observed to eliminate A. proletella in controlled settings, it often arrives too late in the season to effectively control whitefly populations in the field.

== Distribution ==
Encarsia tricolor is widely distributed in Eurasia, mirroring the range of Aleyrodes proletella, reaching as far east as India, with later sightings recorded in Australia. An apparent member of the E. tricolor group was discovered in Brooklyn, New York in 2023, the first recorded sighting in the Americas.
