= Encarsia hansoni =

Scientific classification
- Domain: Eukaryota
- Kingdom: Animalia
- Phylum: Arthropoda
- Class: Insecta
- Order: Hymenoptera
- Family: Aphelinidae
- Genus: Encarsia
- Species: E. hansoni

Binomial name
- Encarsia hansoni Evans & Polaszek, 1998

Species of wasp

Encarsia hansoni is a species of hymenoptera in the family Aphelinidae. The scientific name was first validly published in 1998 by Evans & Polaszek.

The species' habitat is Costa Rica. No subspecies are listed in the Catalog of Life.
