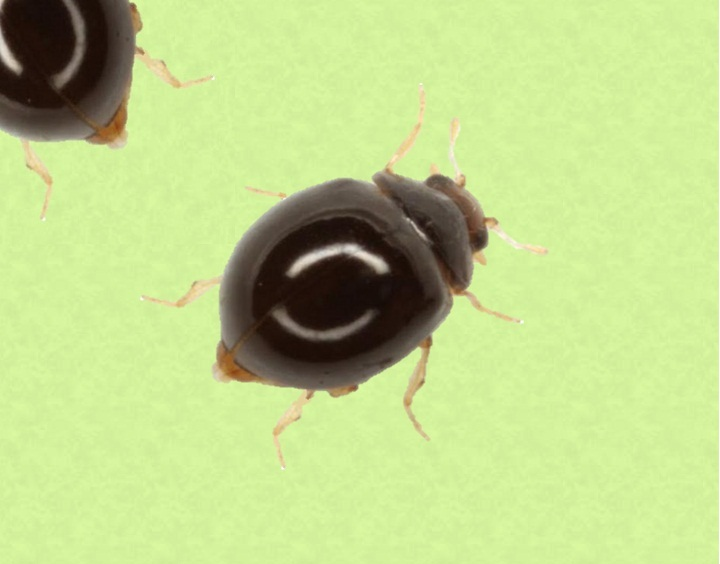

Scientific classification
- Kingdom: Animalia
- Phylum: Arthropoda
- Class: Insecta
- Order: Coleoptera
- Suborder: Polyphaga
- Infraorder: Cucujiformia
- Family: Coccinellidae
- Genus: Delphastus
- Species: D. pusillus

Binomial name
- Delphastus pusillus (LeConte, 1852)

Synonyms
- Oeneis pusilla LeConte, 1852; Oeneis puncticollis LeConte, 1852; Delphastus sonoricus Casey, 1899

= Delphastus pusillus =

Species of beetle

Delphastus pusillus is a small ladybird beetle which preys on all species and stages of whitefly, but prefers eggs and nymphs. The adults are small (1/16 in), shiny, black beetles. Newly emerged adults are pale-brown to almost white. They eventually turn black with a brown head. The eggs are 0.2 mm long, clear and twice as long as they are wide. The elongate larvae are pale yellow.

== Life cycle ==
Female beetles live for about 2 months, during which time they lay 3 to 4 eggs per day; male beetles live for 1½ months. The females generally lay their eggs within clusters of whitefly eggs, which makes it easier for the young larvae to find a food source. Each instar lasts 1½–3 days. D. pusillus pupates on lower leaves, in leaf litter, or in other protected locations, often in groups. The pupal stage lasts approximately 6 days. Development from egg to adult takes approximately 3 weeks at 80–85 °F.

== Use in biocontrol ==
Both larvae and adults are active predators that can consume numerous eggs or nymphs each day. An adult Delphastus takes no longer than half a minute to handle a whitefly egg, and devours up to 160 eggs or 12 large nymphs daily. A larva consumes 1000 whitefly eggs (less if it also eats whitefly nymphs) during its entire development. Adults and larvae feed by piercing the insect with their mouthparts and alternately sucking and regurgitating the internal contents to digest and consume it. Adult females feed more on eggs and first instars than on later stages. They are strong fliers that will migrate to areas that contain high densities of whiteflies. D. pusillus is most effective at high whitefly densities. Since adult female beetles must feed on over 200 eggs per day in order to reproduce, it may be of limited benefit in greenhouses where whitefly populations are low. Both adult and larval beetles avoid feeding on whitefly nymphs parasitised by wasps such as Encarsia formosa and Eretmocerus eremicus when the wasps are in later stages of development.
