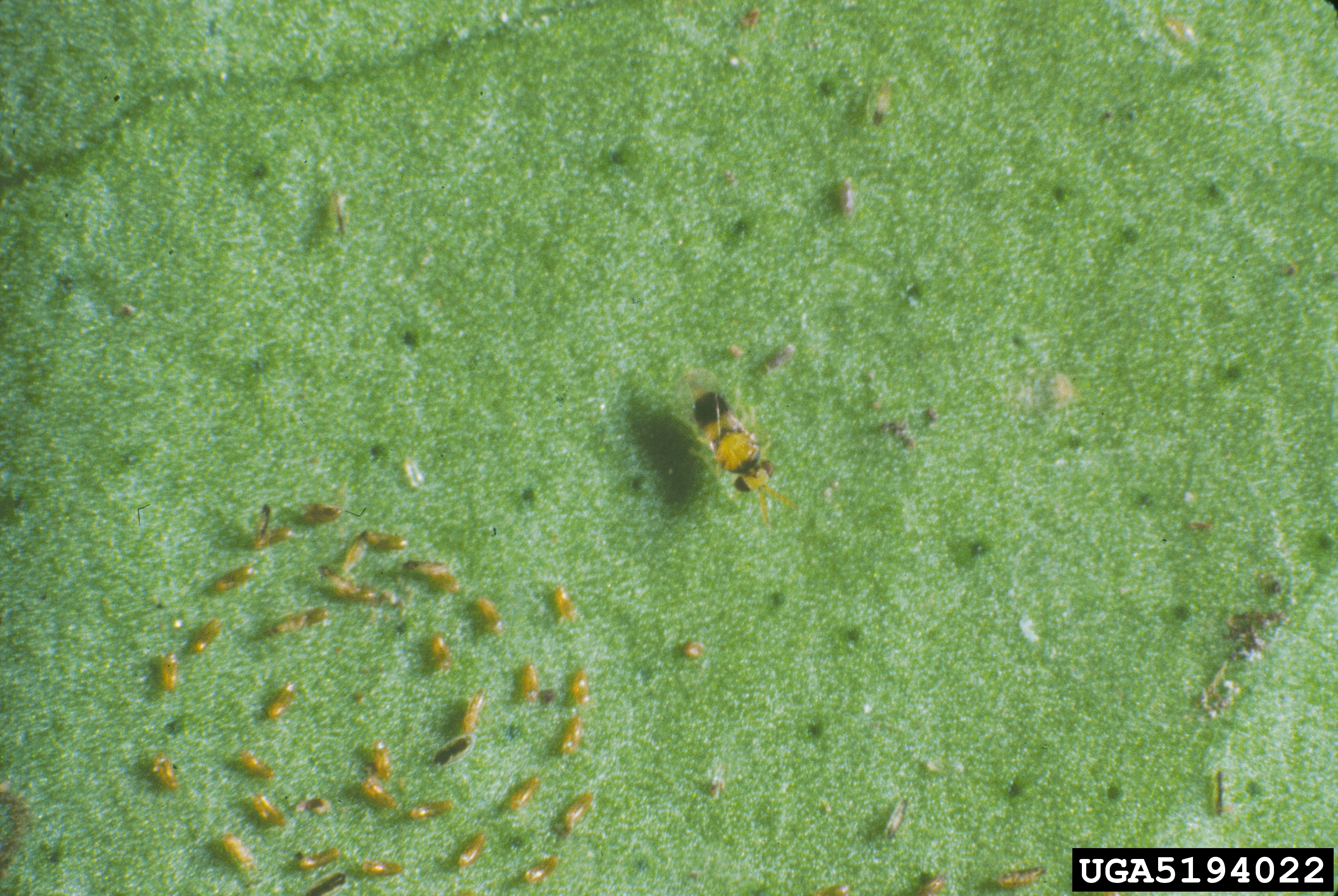
- Adult Encarsia perplexa with eggs and hatching nymphs of citrus blackfly

Scientific classification
- Domain: Eukaryota
- Kingdom: Animalia
- Phylum: Arthropoda
- Class: Insecta
- Order: Hymenoptera
- Family: Aphelinidae
- Subfamily: Coccophaginae
- Genus: Encarsia; Foerster, 1878

Species
- See text

= Encarsia =

Genus of wasps

Encarsia is a large genus of minute parasitic wasps of the family Aphelinidae. The genus is very diverse with currently about 400 described species and worldwide distribution. The number of existing species is expected to be several times higher because many species are still undescribed. Encarsia is a very complex genus, with specimens showing both inter- and intra-specific variations, making morphological classification difficult.

The adult wasps, tiny insects about 1 or 2 millimeters in size, are primarily parasitoids of sessile stages of Sternorrhyncha, in particular whiteflies (Aleyrodidae) and scale insects (Diaspididae). A few species are known to parasitize aphids, eggs of shield-back bugs (Plataspidae), and eggs of Lepidoptera. Females mostly develop as primary endoparasitoids, and males are commonly hyperparasitoids of the same or other species. This so-called heteronomy, a sexually dimorphic host relationship, occurs in quite a few species.

Species of Encarsia are of particular interest because of their economic importance for biological pest control, especially in horticulture and for crops grown under glass. Many seem to be extremely host-specific which is an important trait for an acceptable and effective bio-control agent.

== Species used in biological control ==
- Encarsia berlesei on white peach scale (Pseudaulacaspis pentagona)
- Encarsia bimaculata on sweet potato whitefly (Bemisia tabaci)
- Encarsia clypealis on citrus blackfly (Aleurocanthus woglumi)
- Encarsia formosa on greenhouse whitefly (Trialeurodes vaporariorum)
- Encarsia harrisoni on long mussel scale (Lepidosaphes gloverii)
- Encarsia inaron on cabbage whitefly (Aleyrodes proletella) and ash whitefly (Siphoninus phillyreae)
- Encarsia lahorensis on citrus whitefly (Dialeurodes citri)
- Encarsia lutea on silverleaf whitefly (Bemisia tabaci/Bemisia argentifolii) and greenhouse whitefly (Trialeurodes vaporariorum)
- Encarsia pergandiella on sweet potato whitefly (Bemisia tabaci)
- Encarsia perniciosi on San Jose scale (Quadraspidiotus perniciosus)
- Encarsia perplexa (syn. Encarsia opulenta) on citrus blackfly (Aleurocanthus woglumi)
- Encarsia sophia on papaya whitefly (Trialeurodes variabilis) and sweet potato whitefly (Bemisia tabaci)
- Encarsia tricolor on cabbage whitefly (Aleyrodes proletella)
