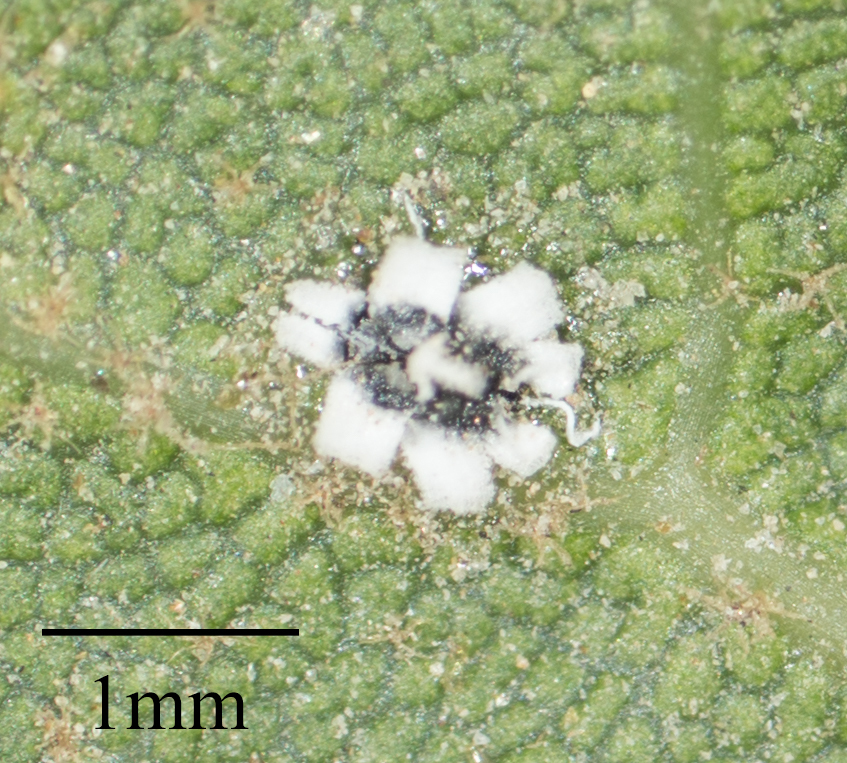

Scientific classification
- Kingdom: Animalia
- Phylum: Arthropoda
- Clade: Pancrustacea
- Class: Insecta
- Order: Hemiptera
- Suborder: Sternorrhyncha
- Family: Aleyrodidae
- Genus: Aleuroplatus
- Species: A. coronata

Binomial name
- Aleuroplatus coronata (Quaintance, 1900)

Synonyms
- Aleurodes coronata Quaintance, 1900

= Aleuroplatus coronata =

Species of true bug

Aleuroplatus coronata, the crown whitefly, is a species of whitefly in the family Aleyrodidae. It is native to the southern United States and Mexico, and it is now established in California, where it is associated with oak and chestnut trees.

== Life cycle ==
Adult crown whiteflies are small flying insects with pale yellow bodies, about 1 mm long. They have four white wings, which appear covered in a dusty wax, and somewhat resemble the wings of a small moth. The adult lays cigar-shaped eggs, which hatch into nymphs, with small, elliptical, semitransparent bodies and antennae, legs, and hairs extending laterally from their margins. The nymphs lose their legs in their second instar, attach themselves to the underside of leaves, and remain immobile into the pupal stage. The pupae are enclosed in puparium, or the exoskeleton of the final larval instar. The puparium is surrounded by a characteristic crown of waxy filaments or plates, inspiring the common name, crown whitefly.

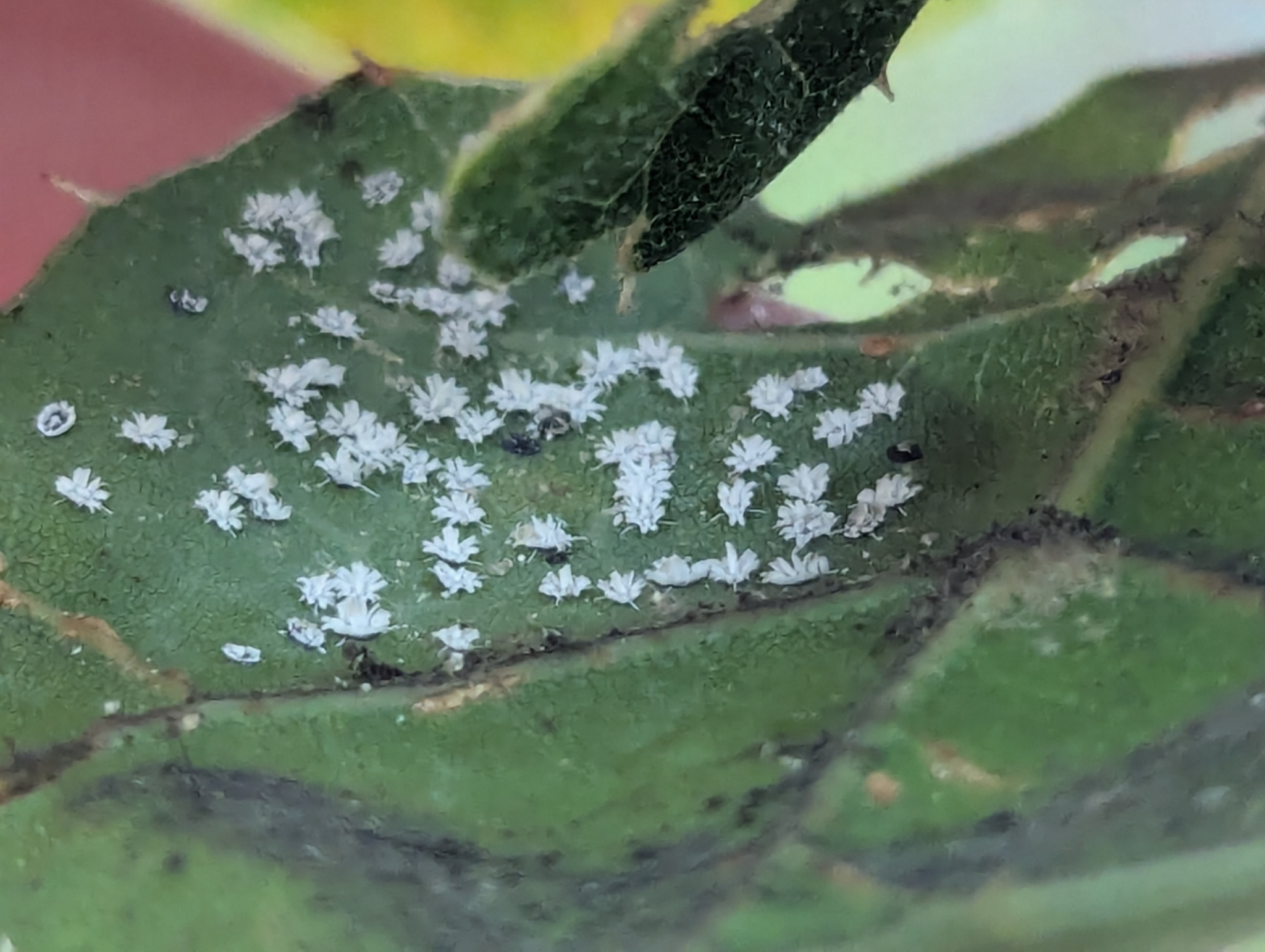
Aleuroplatus coronata shown covering the underside of a coast live oak leaf in Santa Clara County.

== Natural history ==
Aleuroplatus coronata consumes sap from its hosts, and favors coast live oak in particular. Although heavy infestations may cause leaves to fall, the whitefly does not otherwise significantly harm its host trees.

Crown whiteflies have natural predators in California, such as the Delphastus lady beetle. The nymphs and pupae can also be parasitized by parasitoid wasps from the family Aphelinidae, such as Eretmocerus haldemani, Encarsia aurantii, and Encarsia citrella, and Encarsia pergandiella. The presence of these parasitoids can be recognized by a change in color. Some parasitoids blacken the pupa, while E. pergandiella changes the pupa from white to bright yellow, then brown.
