= Delphastus pallidus =

Scientific classification
- Kingdom: Animalia
- Phylum: Arthropoda
- Class: Insecta
- Order: Coleoptera
- Suborder: Polyphaga
- Infraorder: Cucujiformia
- Family: Coccinellidae
- Genus: Delphastus
- Species: D. pallidus

Binomial name
- Delphastus pallidus (LeConte, 1878)

Synonyms
- Oeneis pallida LeConte, 1878

Species of beetle

Delphastus pallidus is a species of lady beetle in the family Coccinellidae. It is found in North America, where it has been recorded from Florida.

== Description ==
Adults reach a length of about 0.90-1.05 mm. They have a pale reddish yellow body and yellow legs.
