= Delphastus abditus =

Scientific classification
- Kingdom: Animalia
- Phylum: Arthropoda
- Class: Insecta
- Order: Coleoptera
- Suborder: Polyphaga
- Infraorder: Cucujiformia
- Family: Coccinellidae
- Genus: Delphastus
- Species: D. abditus

Binomial name
- Delphastus abditus Gordon, 1970

Species of beetle

Delphastus abditus is a species of beetle of the family Coccinellidae. It is found in Brazil.

== Description ==
Adults reach a length of about 1.40 mm. Adults are piceous, while the pronotum is black and the head and legs are yellow.
