= Encarsia harrisoni =

Scientific classification
- Kingdom: Animalia
- Phylum: Arthropoda
- Class: Insecta
- Order: Hymenoptera
- Family: Aphelinidae
- Subfamily: Coccophaginae
- Genus: Encarsia
- Species: E. harrisoni

Binomial name
- Encarsia harrisoni Polaszek, 2014

Species of wasp

Encarsia harrisoni is a species of parasitoid wasp native to England. It was discovered in the playgrounds of Sevenoaks School, and named after David Harrison, chairman of the nearby Harrison Institute.

Only a millimeter long, the species lays its eggs in whiteflies living on maple trees. With no males having been observed over five years of study, the species is believed to be uniparental.
