= Delphastus diversipes =

Scientific classification
- Kingdom: Animalia
- Phylum: Arthropoda
- Class: Insecta
- Order: Coleoptera
- Suborder: Polyphaga
- Infraorder: Cucujiformia
- Family: Coccinellidae
- Genus: Delphastus
- Species: D. diversipes

Binomial name
- Delphastus diversipes (Champion, 1913)

Synonyms
- Lioscymnus diversipes Champion, 1913

Species of beetle

Delphastus diversipes is a species of beetle of the family Coccinellidae. It is found in Mexico and Guatemala.

== Description ==
Adults reach a length of about 1.60 mm. Adults are black, with a yellowish brown head and yellowish brown legs.
