= Delphastus nebulosus =

Scientific classification
- Kingdom: Animalia
- Phylum: Arthropoda
- Class: Insecta
- Order: Coleoptera
- Suborder: Polyphaga
- Infraorder: Cucujiformia
- Family: Coccinellidae
- Genus: Delphastus
- Species: D. nebulosus

Binomial name
- Delphastus nebulosus Chapin, 1940

Species of beetle

Delphastus nebulosus is a species of beetle of the family Coccinellidae. It is found in Puerto Rico.

== Description ==
Adults reach a length of about 1-1.10 mm. Adults are yellowish brown with nearly white legs. There is a brown humeral spot on the elytron.
