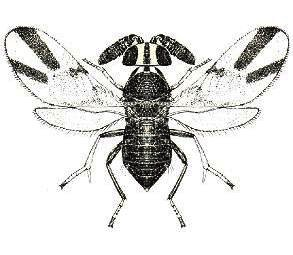
- Comperiella bifasciata

Scientific classification
- Kingdom: Animalia
- Phylum: Arthropoda
- Class: Insecta
- Order: Hymenoptera
- Family: Encyrtidae
- Genus: Comperiella

= Comperiella =

Genus of wasps

Comperiella is a genus of parasitic wasps in the family Encyrtidae, containing around 10 species.

- Comperiella apoda
- Comperiella aspidiotiphaga
- Comperiella bifasciata
- Comperiella calauanica
- Comperiella diversifasciata
- Comperiella indica
- Comperiella karoo
- Comperiella lemniscata
- Comperiella pia
- Comperiella ponticula
- Comperiella unifasciata
