= Delphastus minutus =

Scientific classification
- Kingdom: Animalia
- Phylum: Arthropoda
- Class: Insecta
- Order: Coleoptera
- Suborder: Polyphaga
- Infraorder: Cucujiformia
- Family: Coccinellidae
- Genus: Delphastus
- Species: D. minutus

Binomial name
- Delphastus minutus Gordon, 1970

Species of beetle

Delphastus minutus is a species of beetle of the family Coccinellidae. It is found in Panama and Mexico.

== Description ==
Adults reach a length of about 1 mm. Adults are dark reddish brown, while the head and legs are yellowish brown.
