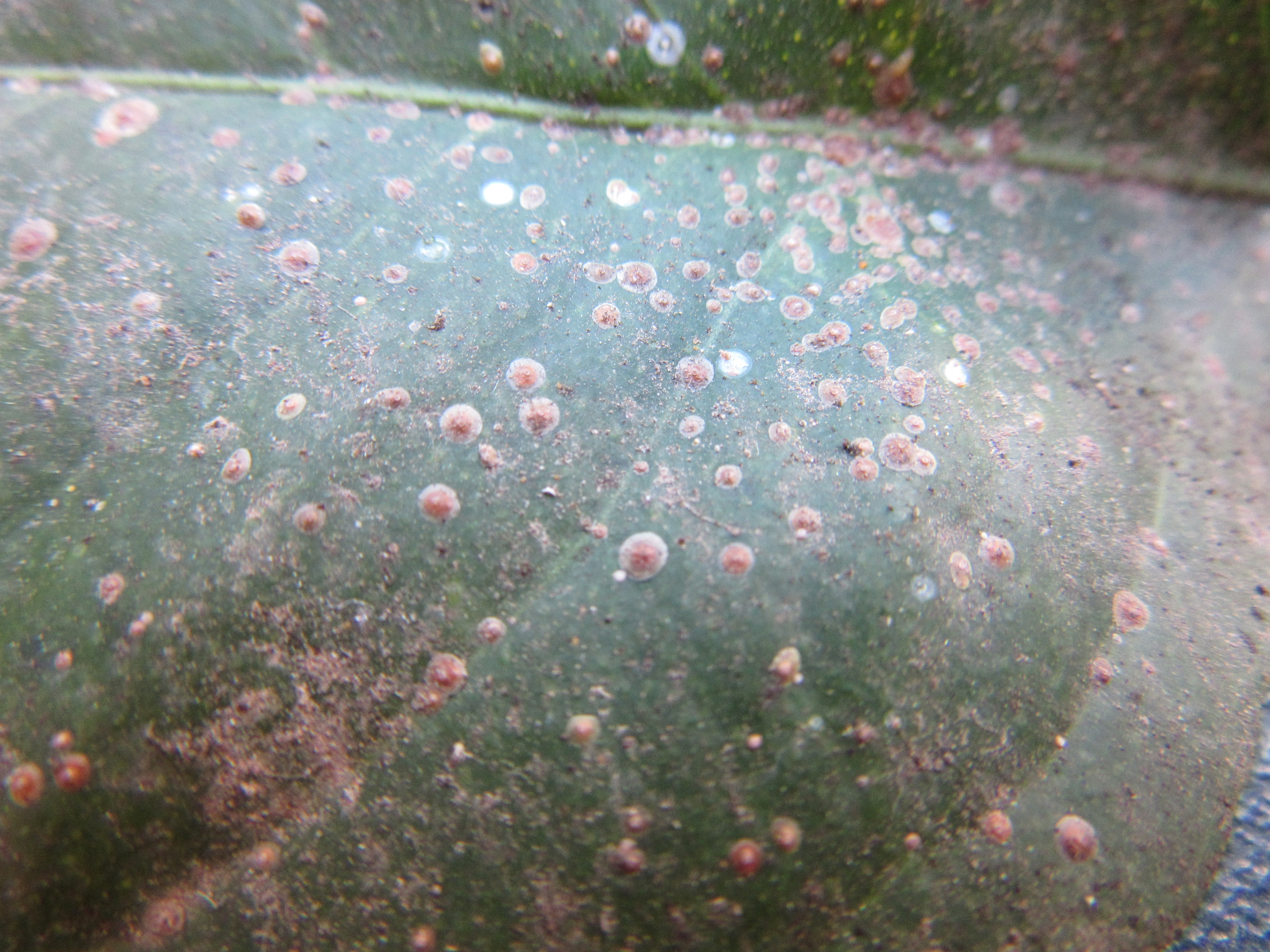

Scientific classification
- Kingdom: Animalia
- Phylum: Arthropoda
- Clade: Pancrustacea
- Class: Insecta
- Order: Hemiptera
- Suborder: Sternorrhyncha
- Family: Diaspididae
- Genus: Aonidiella
- Species: A. aurantii

Binomial name
- Aonidiella aurantii Maskell

Synonyms
- Aspidiotus aurantii; Chrysomphalus aurantii

= Aonidiella aurantii =

California red scale

Species of true bug

Aonidiella aurantii or red scale is an armored scale insect and a major pest of citrus. It is thought to be a native of South China but has been widely dispersed by the agency of man through the movement of infected plant material. In the United States it is known as California red scale. It was first found in California between 1868 and 1875, apparently brought there on planting material imported from Australia.

== Description ==
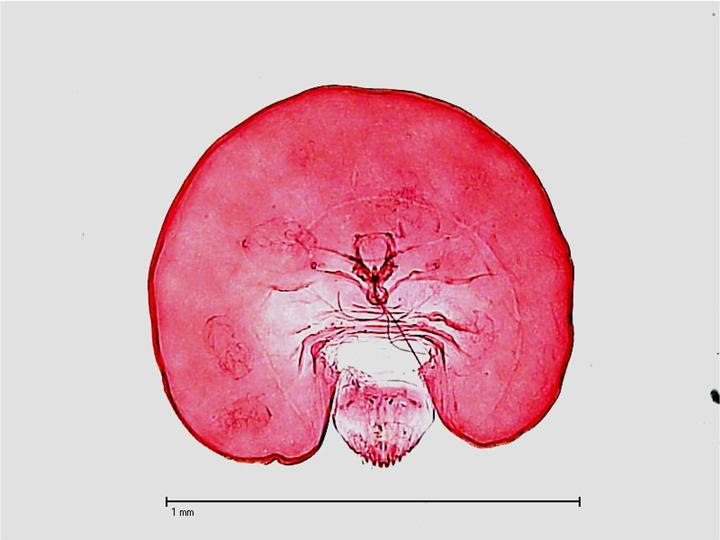
Specimen

The female scale insect has a circular, brownish-red cover about 1.8 millimetres in diameter. It is firmly attached to the surface when the female is moulting or reproducing. The insect itself is visible through the cover and has an oval body which becomes kidney-shaped at the last instar stage. The female molts twice, exuding the material from which the cover is formed and developing a concentric ring in the center each time. There is a characteristic whitish coating on the underside of the body which separates it from the host plant. The female is viviparous with the eggs hatching internally. She produces 100 to 150 young altogether and live nymphs or crawlers emerge from under their mother's cover at the rate of two to three per day. When they first hatch the nymphs are a yellowish color and search for a suitable place to settle in depressions on twigs, leaves or fruits. They then start feeding by inserting their mouthparts deep into the plant tissue and sucking sap from the parenchyma cells. The saliva they inject is very toxic to the leaves, twigs, branches and fruit of citrus trees. They soon begin to develop their own round, waxy covers.

The male scale insect develops similarly until after the second moult when it becomes oval and darker than the female, measuring about one millimetre in diameter with an eccentric cover. The adult male is a small, yellowish two-winged insect that emerges from under its elongated cover after four molts. It lives for about 6 hours and its sole purpose is to mate. It locates unmated females by detecting the pheromones they release.

== Damage and control ==
Red scale is potentially a severe pest of citrus in California, Australia, New Zealand, Mexico, Chile, Argentina, Brazil, Israel, the eastern Mediterranean islands, and South Africa.

Although citrus is the main crop attacked by red scale, it can also be found on species from at least seventy-seven plant families and has been successfully reared in the laboratory on potato tubers and pumpkin. Scale insects of all ages feed by sucking sap. They are found on all parts of the plant but are most noticeable on the fruit. Heavy infestations may cause discoloration, shoot distortion and leaf drop. The fruit may become pitted and unmarketable. The tree's bark may split and the twigs and branches may die back and this sometimes results in the death of the tree. Chemical control is difficult because the insects are protected by their hard waxy covers. They are also becoming resistant to many insecticides and indiscriminate use of pesticides has adverse effects on their natural predators.

Some ant species can increase infestations of red scale indirectly. By patrolling the branches in search of honeydew from soft scales, cottony cushion scale, mealybugs and aphids, they deter predators and parasitoids and thus enable red scale to flourish unmolested. The only mobile stage of red scale is the first instar crawler. It can move about a metre but may also be dispersed to other plants by wind, flying insects and birds as well as human activities.

Other crops that suffer economic damage from attack by red scale include papaya (Carica papaya) in Taiwan, guava (Psidium guajava) in India and olives in California and countries around the Mediterranean, with serious damage being caused to olives in Morocco.

Natural enemies of red scale vary in the different parts of the world in which it is found. Parasitoids include Aphelinus africanus, several species of Aphytis, Comperiella bifasciata, species of Encarsia, Habrolepis rouxi and Signiphora fax. Predators include Aleurodothrips fasciapennis, several species of Chilocorus, Cybocephalus micans, Cryptolaemus montrouzieri, Hemisarcoptes malus and Rhyzobius lophanthae.

In California, several predators feed on red scale including the lady beetles, Rhyzobius lophanthae, Chilocorus orbus and Chiliocorus cacti. The naturally occurring parasitic wasps, Aphytis melinus, Aphytis lingnanensis and Comperiella bifasciata also play a part in controlling red scale on citrus but their ability to do so depends on the selective use of insecticides for other pests. Careful monitoring of the host plants will indicate whether release of captive-bred Aphytis melinus is necessary and the use of pesticides should be minimized before this is done. Ants, especially the Argentine ant, Linepithema humile, and the native gray ant should also be controlled as they disrupt the predation of the scale insects by the wasp.

In Australia, the parasitic wasp Aphytis lingnanensis is used for biological pest control. It is usually released annually as, although the wasps may build up naturally without being released, the life cycle is not well synchronized with the pest and significant populations of scale insect may build up before many wasps are available.
