= Delphastus anthracinus =

Scientific classification
- Kingdom: Animalia
- Phylum: Arthropoda
- Class: Insecta
- Order: Coleoptera
- Suborder: Polyphaga
- Infraorder: Cucujiformia
- Family: Coccinellidae
- Genus: Delphastus
- Species: D. anthracinus

Binomial name
- Delphastus anthracinus Gordon, 1970

Species of beetle

Delphastus anthracinus is a species of beetle of the family Coccinellidae. It is found in Peru.

== Description ==
Adults reach a length of about 1.40 mm. Adults black, although the head and legs are reddish brown.
