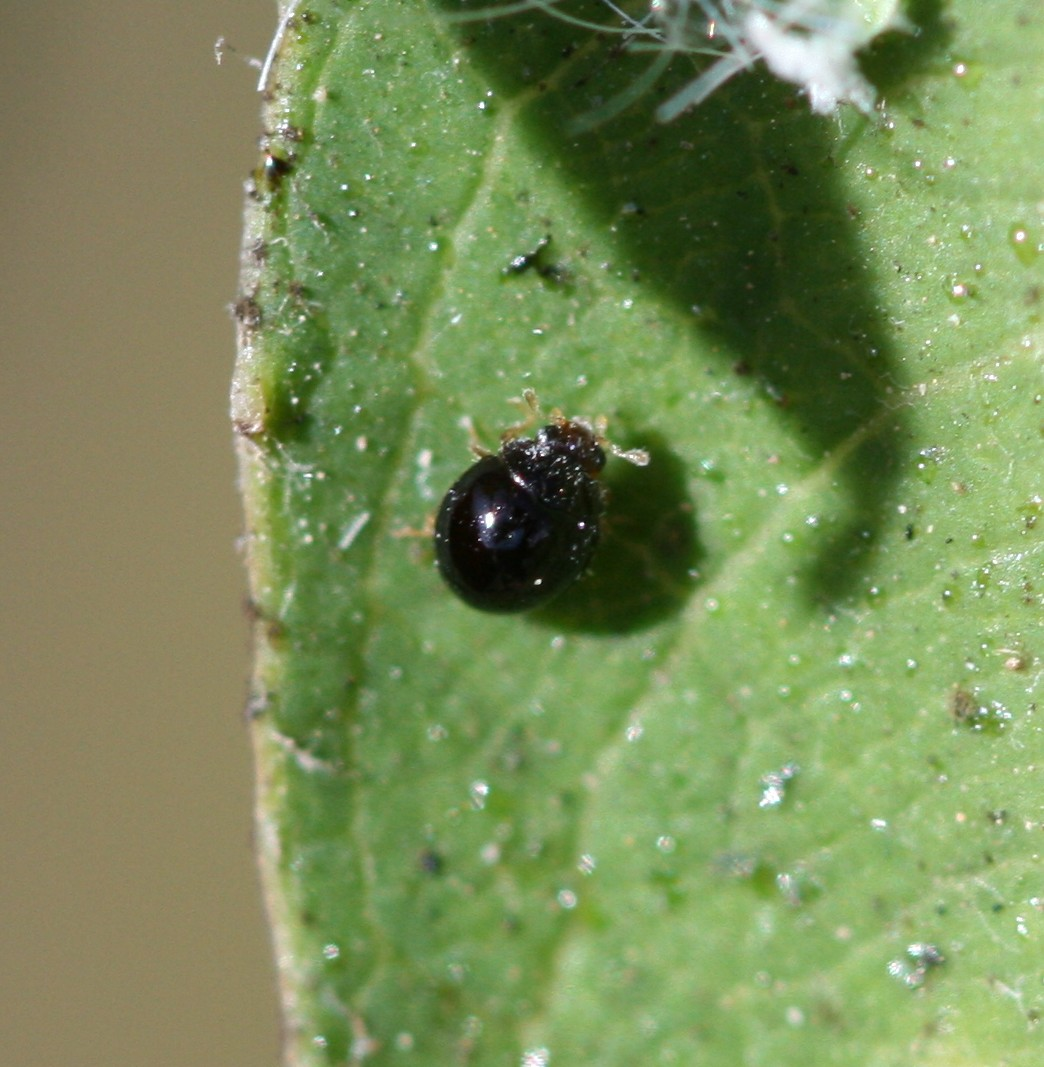

Scientific classification
- Kingdom: Animalia
- Phylum: Arthropoda
- Class: Insecta
- Order: Coleoptera
- Suborder: Polyphaga
- Infraorder: Cucujiformia
- Family: Coccinellidae
- Genus: Delphastus
- Species: D. catalinae

Binomial name
- Delphastus catalinae (Horn, 1895)

Synonyms
- Cryptognatha catalinae Horn, 1895; Delphastus occidentalis Juárez & Zaragoza, 1990

= Delphastus catalinae =

Species of beetle

Delphastus catalinae is a species of beetle of the family Coccinellidae. It is found in North America, where it has been recorded from California.

== Description ==
Adults reach a length of about 1.40–1.50 mm. They have a medium reddish brown body, while the median area of the pronotum is slightly darker.

== Etymology ==
The species name is derived from Latin and means fierce. This refers to the forbidding appearance of the head and mouthparts.

== Biology ==
They have been recorded feeding on Pealius kelloggi.
