= Delphastus chapini =

Scientific classification
- Kingdom: Animalia
- Phylum: Arthropoda
- Class: Insecta
- Order: Coleoptera
- Suborder: Polyphaga
- Infraorder: Cucujiformia
- Family: Coccinellidae
- Genus: Delphastus
- Species: D. chapini

Binomial name
- Delphastus chapini Gordon, 1970

Species of beetle

Delphastus chapini is a species of beetle of the family Coccinellidae. It is found in Trinidad.

== Description ==
Adults reach a length of about 1.15–1.20 mm. Adults dark reddish brown, with the head and legs yellowish brown.

== Etymology ==
The species is named in honour of E. A. Chapin in recognition of his work on coccinellids.
