= Delphastus dubitalis =

Scientific classification
- Kingdom: Animalia
- Phylum: Arthropoda
- Class: Insecta
- Order: Coleoptera
- Suborder: Polyphaga
- Infraorder: Cucujiformia
- Family: Coccinellidae
- Genus: Delphastus
- Species: D. dubitalis

Binomial name
- Delphastus dubitalis Gordon, 1970

Species of beetle

Delphastus dubitalis is a species of beetle of the family Coccinellidae. It is found in Venezuela.

== Description ==
Adults reach a length of about 1.25 mm. Adults have a black elytron, a yellow pronotum with a piceous median area and a yellow head and legs.
