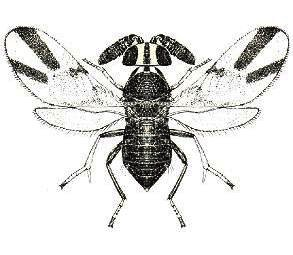

Scientific classification
- Domain: Eukaryota
- Kingdom: Animalia
- Phylum: Arthropoda
- Class: Insecta
- Order: Hymenoptera
- Family: Encyrtidae
- Genus: Comperiella
- Species: C. bifasciata

Binomial name
- Comperiella bifasciata Howard, 1906

= Comperiella bifasciata =

Species of wasp

Comperiella bifasciata is a parasitic wasp species in the genus Comperiella in the family Encyrtidae. It is used in biological control of California red scale and yellow scale of citrus.

== Description ==
Comperiella bifasciata is a tiny black wasp with two white bars on the head. These are more prominent in females, which also have dark patches on the wings, giving them the appearance of having a forked tail; the wings of males are unblotched.

== History ==
C. bifasciata is a parasite of the red scale (Aonidiella aurantii), a major insect pest of citrus. This pest was accidentally brought into the United States in the second half of the nineteenth century, and is known there as California red scale.

In attempts to try to control the red scale, in 1908 Comperiella bifasciata, and two other parasitic wasps, were introduced into California from Japan. It failed to become established on red scale but was found by 1931 to have become established on yellow scale (Aonidiella citrina). It was later established that an error had been made and that it was not parasitising Aonidiella aurantii in Japan, but rather Aonidiella taxus and Chrysomphalus bifasciculatus. When imports of a different biological race were made from China between 1947 and 1949, the parasite did become established on red scale in California.

These two types are identical in appearance and will hybridise in the laboratory, but maintain their separate identities in the field. In the San Joaquin Valley, wasps reared from yellow scale are always of the Japanese type while those raised from red scale are the Chinese type. It seems that the hybrid is not so well adapted as either of its parents, so natural selection eliminates it, thereby preserving the two distinct types.

== Ecology ==
The larva of C. bifasciata is an endoparasite. The adult female seeks out third instar and fourth instar female scale insects, but is prepared to oviposit in any stage except females that have already produced crawlers. Each egg is laid singly and the developing larva feeds inside its host as it grows. When it pupates, black meconium pellets are deposited and get pushed to one side under the scale. When it emerges, the wasp chews a jagged-edged hole through the scale's body and scale. The mummified corpse of the scale insect, with black meconium deposits inside, usually remains stuck to the host plant.

== Use in biological control ==
In California, the most important parasite of yellow scale is C. bifasciata. The California red scale is most easily controlled by using the ectoparasite Aphytis, with C. bifasciata being unable to compete with Aphytis because the latter consumes the scale larvae including any developing C. bifasciata larvae that happens to be inside. However, in inland climates, such as in the San Joaquin Valley, Aphytis is less suitable for use and C. bifasciata is more effective.
