= Encarsia inaron =

Scientific classification
- Kingdom: Animalia
- Phylum: Arthropoda
- Clade: Pancrustacea
- Class: Insecta
- Order: Hymenoptera
- Family: Aphelinidae
- Subfamily: Coccophaginae
- Genus: Encarsia
- Species: E. inaron

Binomial name
- Encarsia inaron (Walker, 1839)

Synonyms
- Aphelinus inaron Walker, 1839; Aphelinus idaeus Walker, 1839; Encarsia indifferentis Mercet, 1929; Encarsia partenopea Masi, 1909; Trychaporus aleyrodis Mercet, 1930

Species of wasp

Encarsia inaron is a parasitoid wasp used in the control of ash whitefly, Siphoninus phillyreae. The ash whitefly is an insect from Europe that feeds on the sap of plants, and has become a pest in North America. E. inaron was acquired from Italy and Israel and brought to California in 1989.

== Appearance ==
Encarsia inaron are very tiny wasps measuring approximately 0.5 millimetres (0.020 in), thus requiring a magnifying glass for better visibility. Unlike most wasps, they do not have a stinger. Males and females can be distinguished based on their body color patterns. Both adult males and females possess black heads and eyes and clear wings, but females display a yellow abdomen while males display a black one.

== Habitat ==
These wasps are mostly found in woody shrubs and trees.

== Life cycle ==
An adult E. inaron deposits its eggs on the ash whitefly, where it develops inside. Inside the abdomen of the ash whitefly, the larvae begin to grow and have a sickle shape. Before the end of development, the adult E inaron bursts out of the ash whitefly, thereby killing it. Maturation takes roughly three weeks.

== Usefulness ==
Prior to the introduction of E.inaron in California, ash whitefly infestation was pervasive. Ash, pear, and ornamental trees were naked, for leaves have fallen to the ground. Beginning in 1989 when the parasitoid wasps were established, ash whitefly population declined significantly. Within two years, ash whiteflies were virtually eliminated. As a result, it saved cities money from being spent on managing ash whitefly infestation.
