= Delphastus argentinicus =

Scientific classification
- Kingdom: Animalia
- Phylum: Arthropoda
- Class: Insecta
- Order: Coleoptera
- Suborder: Polyphaga
- Infraorder: Cucujiformia
- Family: Coccinellidae
- Genus: Delphastus
- Species: D. argentinicus

Binomial name
- Delphastus argentinicus Nunenmacher, 1937

Species of beetle

Delphastus argentinicus is a species of beetle of the family Coccinellidae. It is found in Argentina, Brazil and Paraguay.

== Description ==
Adults reach a length of about 1.30 mm. Adults are brown. The lateral margins of the pronotum and the legs are yellow.
