= Aleuroplatus =

Scientific classification
- Kingdom: Animalia
- Phylum: Arthropoda
- Class: Insecta
- Order: Hemiptera
- Suborder: Sternorrhyncha
- Family: Aleyrodidae
- Subfamily: Aleyrodinae
- Genus: Aleuroplatus; Quaintance & Baker, 1914

Genus of insects

Aleuroplatus is a genus of whiteflies in the family Aleyrodidae.

== Species ==
- Aleuroplatus acaciae Bink-Moenen, 1983
- Aleuroplatus affinis Takahashi, 1961
- Aleuroplatus agauriae Takahashi, 1955
- Aleuroplatus akeassii Cohic, 1969
- Aleuroplatus alcocki Peal, 1903
- Aleuroplatus alpinus Takahashi, 1955
- Aleuroplatus anapatsae Takahashi, 1951
- Aleuroplatus berbericolus Quaintance & Baker, 1917
- Aleuroplatus bignoniae Russell, 1944
- Aleuroplatus biluminiporus Martin & Malumphy, 2002
- Aleuroplatus bossi Takahashi, 1936
- Aleuroplatus cadabae Priesner & Hosny, 1934
- Aleuroplatus claricephalus Takahashi, 1940
- Aleuroplatus cockerelli von Ihering, 1897
- Aleuroplatus cococolus Quaintance & Baker, 1917
- Aleuroplatus coronata Quaintance, 1900
- Aleuroplatus daitoensis Takahashi, 1940
- Aleuroplatus dentatus Sampson & Drews, 1941
- Aleuroplatus dorsipallidus Martin, 1988
- Aleuroplatus dubius Takahashi, 1955
- Aleuroplatus elmarae Mound & Halsey, 1978
- Aleuroplatus epigaeae Russell, 1944
- Aleuroplatus evodiae Takahashi, 1960
- Aleuroplatus fici Takahashi, 1932
- Aleuroplatus ficifolii Takahashi, 1942
- Aleuroplatus ficusrugosae Quaintance & Baker, 1917
- Aleuroplatus gelatinosus Cockerell, 1898
- Aleuroplatus graphicus Bondar, 1923
- Aleuroplatus hiezi Cohic, 1968
- Aleuroplatus hoyae Peal, 1903
- Aleuroplatus ilicis Russell, 1944
- Aleuroplatus incisus Quaintance & Baker, 1917
- Aleuroplatus incurvatus Takahashi, 1961
- Aleuroplatus insularis Takahashi, 1941
- Aleuroplatus joholensis Corbett, 1935
- Aleuroplatus lateralis Bondar, 1923
- Aleuroplatus latus Takahashi, 1939
- Aleuroplatus liquidambaris Takahashi, 1941
- Aleuroplatus magnoliae Russell, 1944
- Aleuroplatus malayanus Takahashi, 1955
- Aleuroplatus mameti Takahashi, 1937
- Aleuroplatus manjakaensis Takahashi, 1955
- Aleuroplatus multipori Takahashi, 1940
- Aleuroplatus myricae Quaintance & Baker, 1917
- Aleuroplatus mysorensis David & Subramaniam, 1976
- Aleuroplatus neovatus Takahashi, 1961
- Aleuroplatus oculiminutus Quaintance & Baker, 1917
- Aleuroplatus oculireniformis Quaintance & Baker, 1917
- Aleuroplatus ovatus Quaintance & Baker, 1917
- Aleuroplatus panamensis Sampson & Drews, 1941
- Aleuroplatus pauliani Takahashi, 1955
- Aleuroplatus pectiniferus Quaintance & Baker, 1917
- Aleuroplatus ficusgibbosae Corbett, 1926
- Aleuroplatus periplocae Dozier, 1934
- Aleuroplatus perseaphagus Martin, Aguiar & Pita, 1996
- Aleuroplatus pileae Takahashi, 1939
- Aleuroplatus plumosus Quaintance, 1900
- Aleuroplatus polystachyae Takahashi, 1955
- Aleuroplatus premnae Corbett, 1926
- Aleuroplatus quaintancei Peal, 1903
- Aleuroplatus quercusaquaticae Quaintance, 1900
- Aleuroplatus robinsoni Takahashi, 1955
- Aleuroplatus sculpturatus Quaintance & Baker, 1917
- Aleuroplatus semiplumosus Russell, 1944
- Aleuroplatus serratus Takahashi, 1955
- Aleuroplatus sinepecten Singh, 1945
- Aleuroplatus spina Singh, 1931
- Aleuroplatus stellatus Hempel, 1922
- Aleuroplatus subrotundus Takahashi, 1938
- Aleuroplatus translucidus Quaintance & Baker, 1917
- Aleuroplatus tsibabenae Takahashi, 1955
- Aleuroplatus tsimananensis Takahashi, 1955
- Aleuroplatus tuberculatus Takahashi, 1951
- Aleuroplatus vaccinii Russell, 1944
- Aleuroplatus validus Quaintance & Baker, 1917
- Aleuroplatus variegatus Quaintance & Baker, 1917
- Aleuroplatus vinsoniodes Cockerell, 1898
- Aleuroplatus weinmanniae Takahashi, 1951
