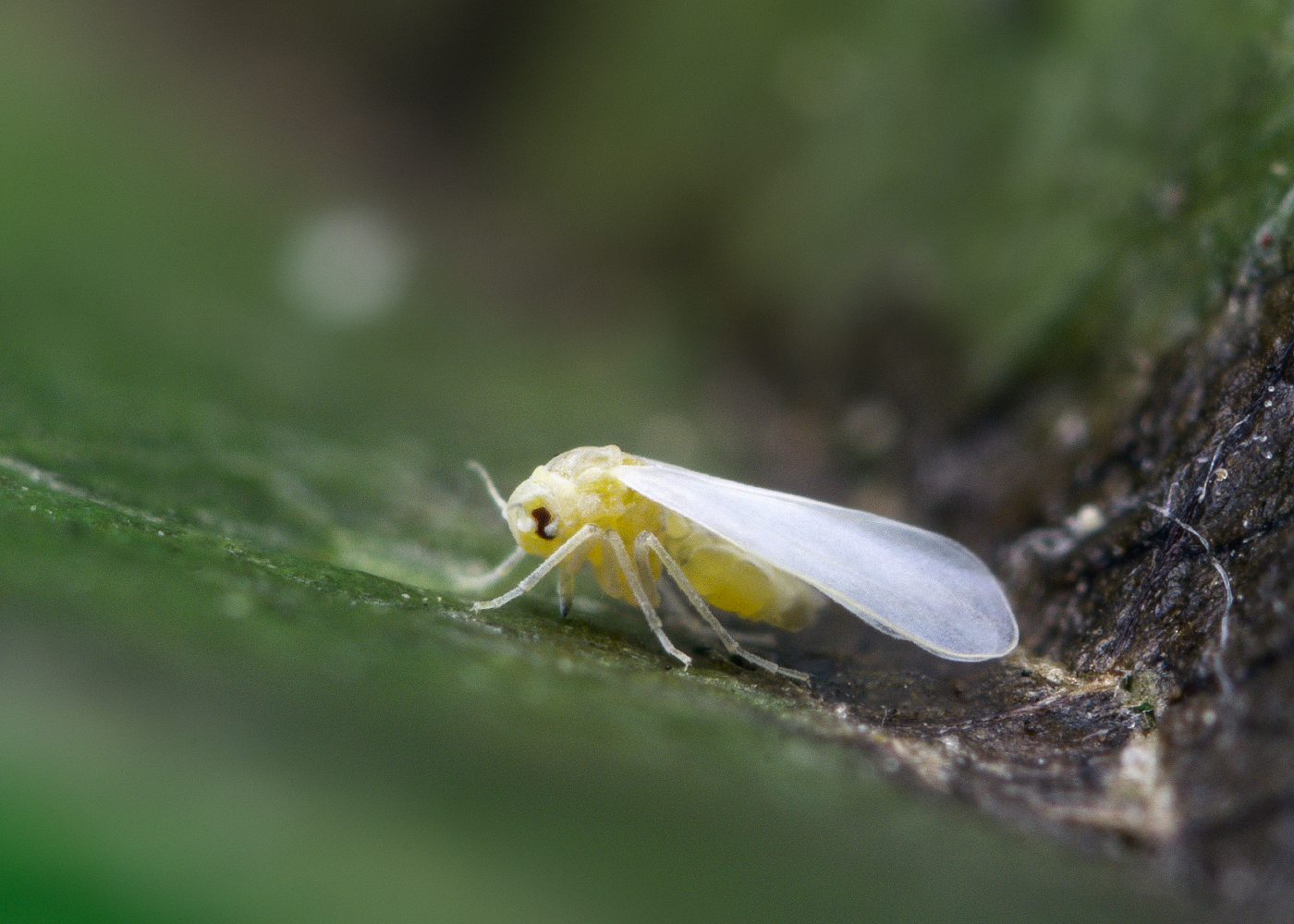
- Siphoninus phillyreae in Oregon

Scientific classification
- Domain: Eukaryota
- Kingdom: Animalia
- Phylum: Arthropoda
- Class: Insecta
- Order: Hemiptera
- Suborder: Sternorrhyncha
- Family: Aleyrodidae
- Subfamily: Aleyrodinae
- Genus: Siphoninus; Silvestri, 1915

= Siphoninus =

Genus of true bugs

Siphoninus is a genus of whiteflies in the family Aleyrodidae.

== Species ==
- Siphoninus gruveli Cohic, 1968
- Siphoninus immaculatus Heeger, 1856
- Siphoninus phillyreae Haliday, 1835
