= Delphastus collaris =

Scientific classification
- Kingdom: Animalia
- Phylum: Arthropoda
- Class: Insecta
- Order: Coleoptera
- Suborder: Polyphaga
- Infraorder: Cucujiformia
- Family: Coccinellidae
- Genus: Delphastus
- Species: D. collaris

Binomial name
- Delphastus collaris Chapin, 1940

Species of beetle

Delphastus collaris is a species of beetle of the family Coccinellidae. It is found in Panama.

== Description ==
Adults reach a length of about 1.20–1.40 mm. Adults are piceous to dark brown. The head, pronotum and legs of the males are yellowish brown, while females have a brown head brown and yellow legs.
