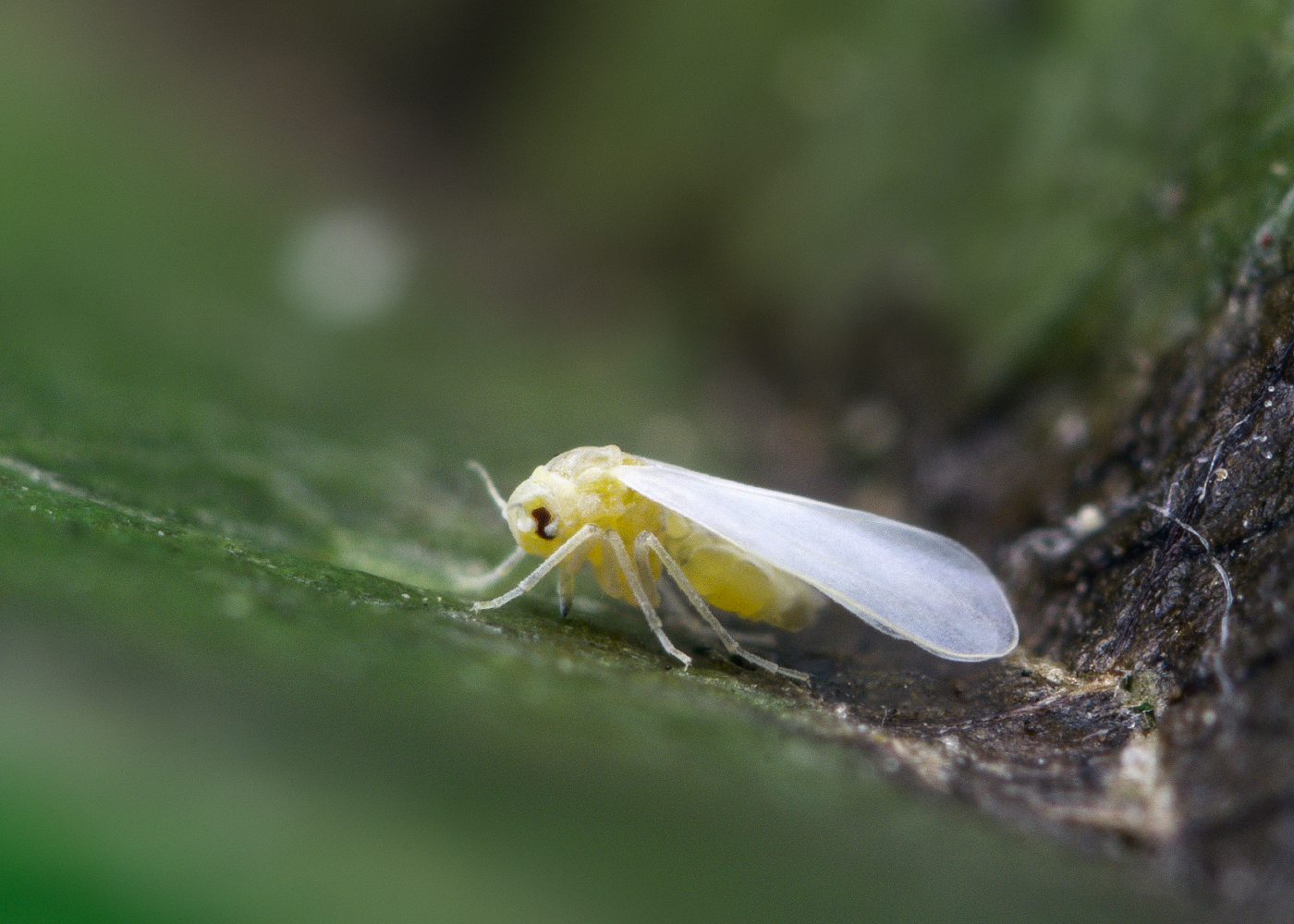
- Ash whitefly in Oregon

Scientific classification
- Kingdom: Animalia
- Phylum: Arthropoda
- Clade: Pancrustacea
- Class: Insecta
- Order: Hemiptera
- Suborder: Sternorrhyncha
- Family: Aleyrodidae
- Genus: Siphoninus
- Species: S. phillyreae

Binomial name
- Siphoninus phillyreae (Haliday, 1835)

= Siphoninus phillyreae =

Species of true bug

Siphoninus phillyreae, the ash whitefly, is a species of whitefly native to western Eurasia, India and North Africa but also introduced to North America. It is known in agriculture as a pest species of fruit trees, including pomegranates, pear and apple trees. It also feeds on ash and ornamental pear trees. Encarsia inaron is used as a biological control for it.
