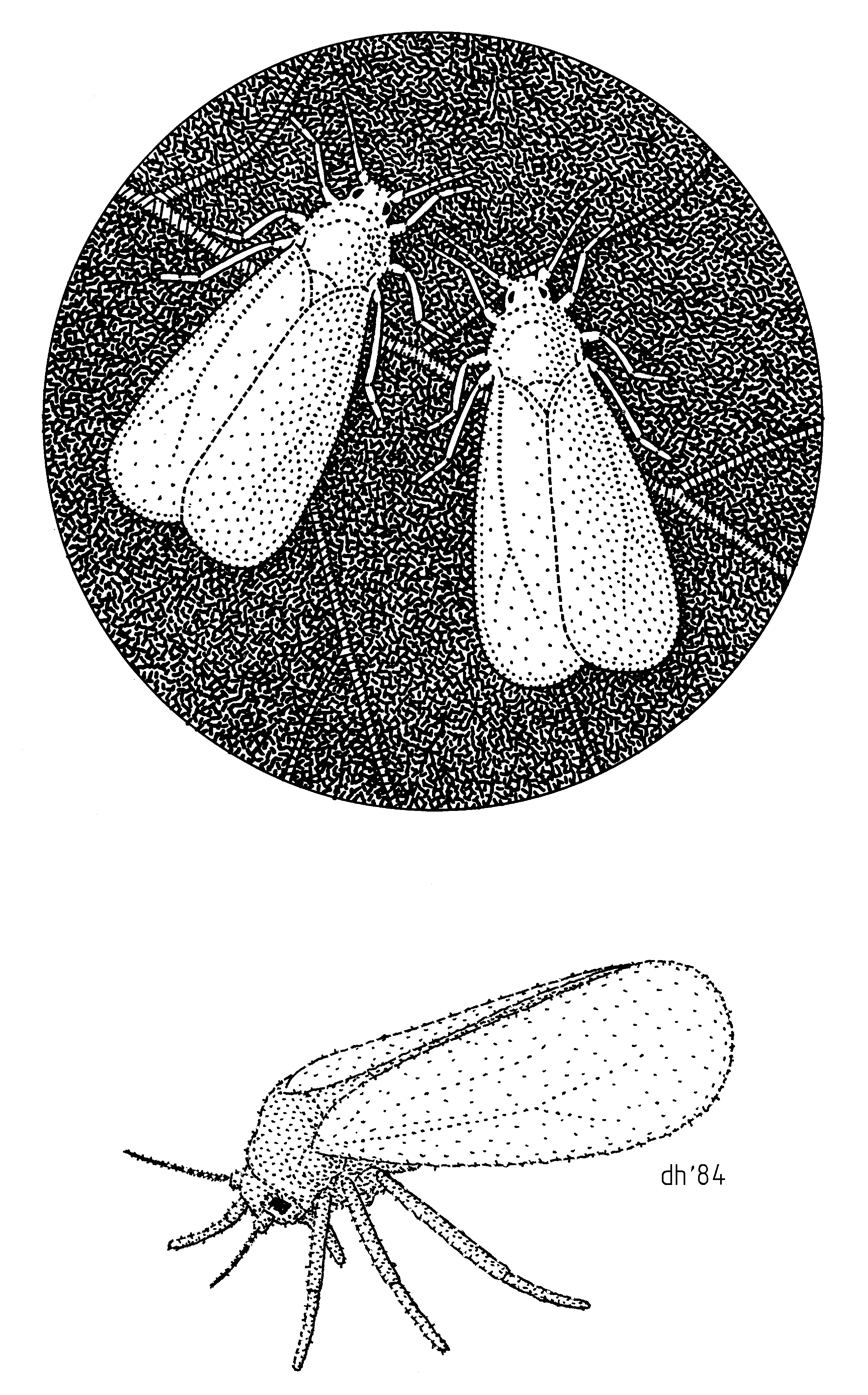
- Trialeurodes vaporariorum by Des Helmore

Scientific classification
- Kingdom: Animalia
- Phylum: Arthropoda
- Class: Insecta
- Order: Hemiptera
- Suborder: Sternorrhyncha
- Family: Aleyrodidae
- Genus: Trialeurodes
- Species: T. vaporariorum

Binomial name
- Trialeurodes vaporariorum (Westwood, 1856)

= Greenhouse whitefly =

Species of true bug

Trialeurodes vaporariorum, commonly known as the glasshouse whitefly or greenhouse whitefly, is an insect that inhabits the world's temperate regions. Like various other whiteflies, it is a primary insect pest of many fruit, vegetable and ornamental crops. It is frequently found in glasshouses (greenhouses), polytunnels, and other protected horticultural environments. Adults are 1–2 mm in length, with yellowish bodies and four wax-coated wings held near parallel to the leaf surface.

== Life cycle ==
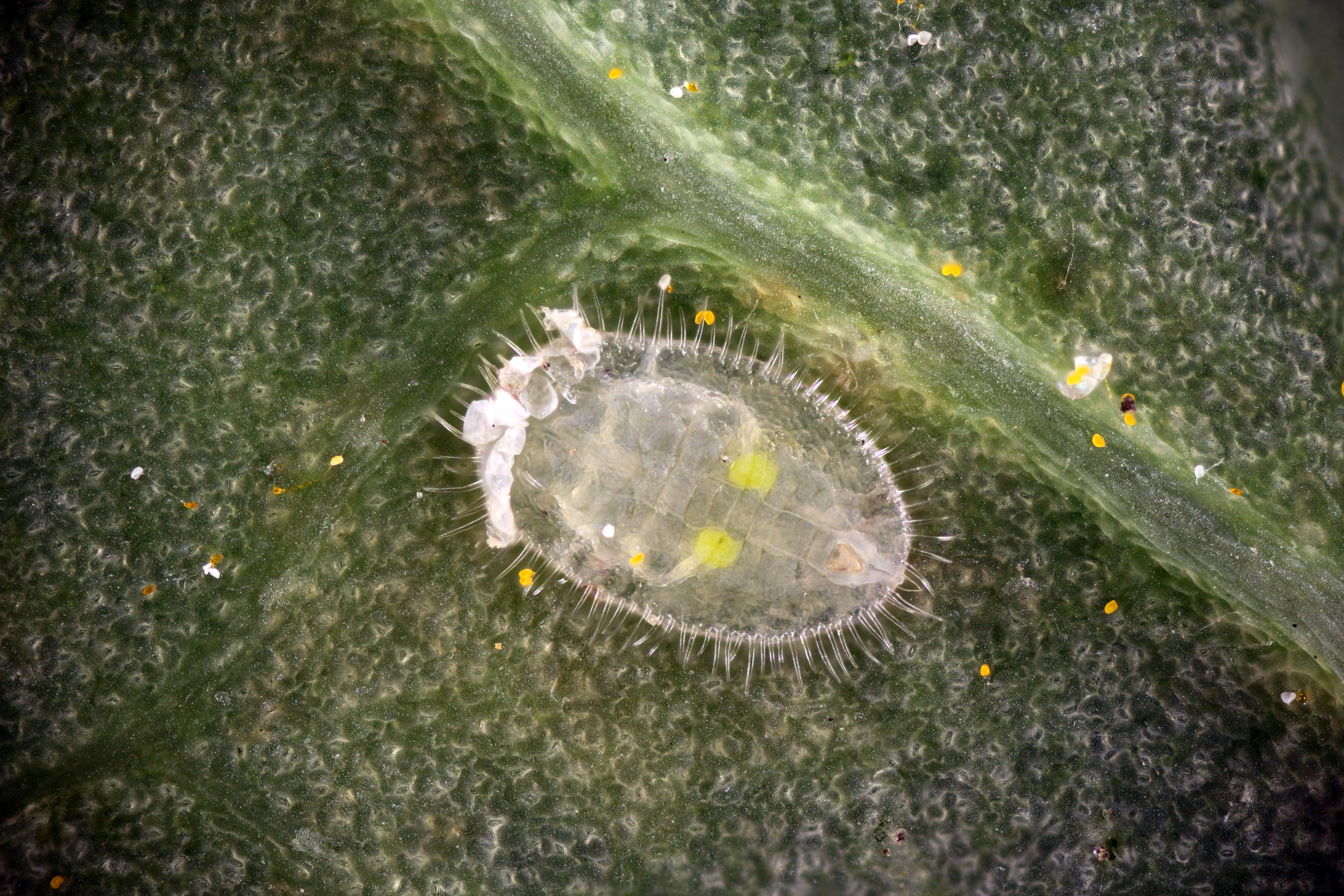
Greenhouse whitefly nymph.

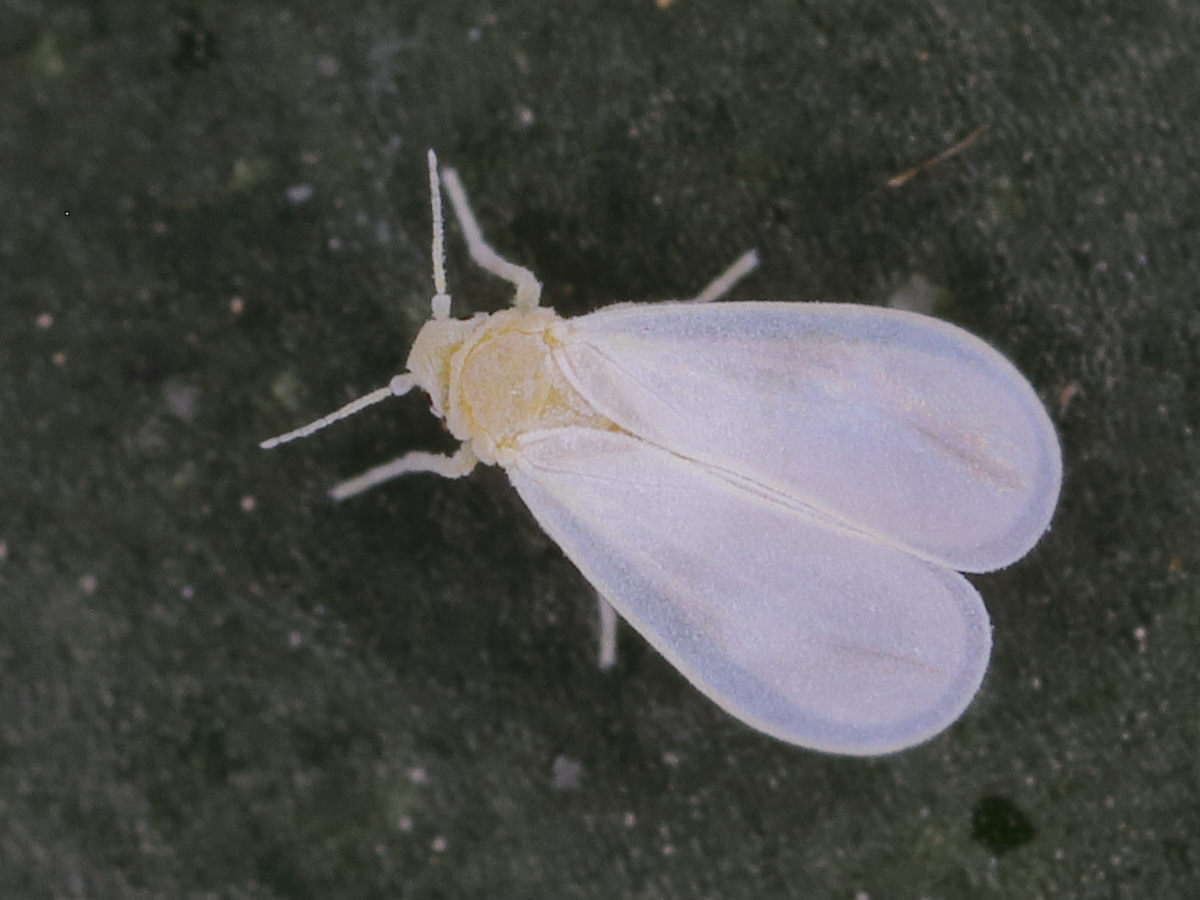
Adult

Females are capable of mating less than 24 hours after emergence and most frequently lay their eggs on the undersides of leaves. Eggs are pale yellow in colour, before turning grey prior to hatching. Newly hatched nymphs, often known as crawlers, are the only mobile immature life-stage. During the first and second nymph instars, the appearance is that of a pale yellow/translucent, flat scale which can be difficult to distinguish with the naked eye. During the fourth and final immature life-stage, referred to as the "pupa", compound eyes and other body tissues become visible as the nymph thickens and rises from the leaf-surface.

== Plant damage ==
All life-stages apart from eggs and "pupae" cause crop damage through direct feeding, inserting their stylet into leaf veins and extracting nourishment from the phloem sap. As a by-product of feeding, honeydew is excreted and that alone can be a second, major source of damage. The third and potentially most harmful characteristic is the ability of adults to transmit several plant viruses. The crop hosts principally affected are vegetables such as cucurbits, potatoes and tomatoes, although a range of other crop and non-crop plants including weed species are susceptible, and can therefore harbour the infection.

== Control ==
Effective control has been provided for many years through the release of beneficial insects, such as the aphelinid parasitoid, Encarsia formosa (Gahan). If required, integrated pest management strategies can incorporate applications of selective chemical insecticides or biopesticides such as Lecanicillium muscarium that complement these natural enemies. For the majority of outdoor crops chemicals are still the most widely used method of control. To study pest resistance management a 787‐Mb high‐quality draft genome has been sequenced and assembled.
