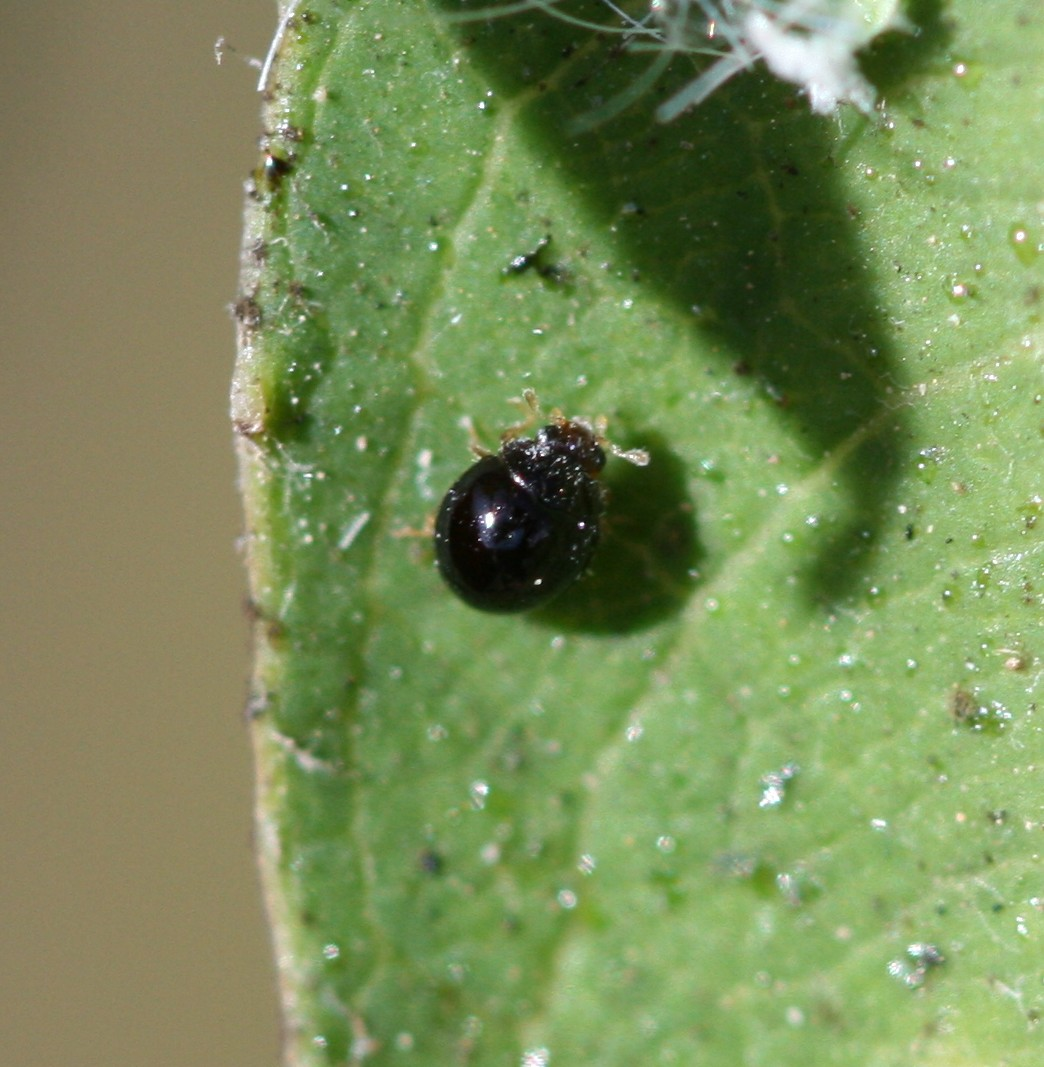
- Delphastus catalinae

Scientific classification
- Kingdom: Animalia
- Phylum: Arthropoda
- Class: Insecta
- Order: Coleoptera
- Suborder: Polyphaga
- Infraorder: Cucujiformia
- Family: Coccinellidae
- Tribe: Serangiini
- Genus: Delphastus; Casey, 1899

Synonyms
- Lioscymnus Champion, 1913

= Delphastus =

Genus of beetles

Delphastus is a genus of lady beetles in the family Coccinellidae. There are more than 20 described species in Delphastus.

== Species ==
These species belong to the genus Delphastus:

- Delphastus abditus Gordon
- Delphastus amazonensis Gordon
- Delphastus anthracinus Gordon
- Delphastus argentinicus Nunenmacher, 1937
- Delphastus barti Duverger, 1986
- Delphastus bechyneorum Gordon, 1994
- Delphastus berryi Gordon
- Delphastus boothi Gordon, 1994
- Delphastus catalinae (Horn, 1895)
- Delphastus celatus Gordon
- Delphastus chapini Gordon
- Delphastus collaris Chapin
- Delphastus davidsoni Gordon, 1994
- Delphastus dejavu Gordon
- Delphastus diversipes (Champion, 1913)
- Delphastus dubitalis Gordon, 1970
- Delphastus ecuadorensis Gordon
- Delphastus flavicollis Gordon
- Delphastus hirtulus Kirsch
- Delphastus huahuai Gordon
- Delphastus mexicanus Gordon, 1994
- Delphastus minutus Gordon
- Delphastus nebulosus Chapin, 1940
- Delphastus pallidus (LeConte, 1878)
- Delphastus punctum Gordon, 1994
- Delphastus pusillus (Leconte, 1852) (whitefly predator)
- Delphastus quinculus Gordon

== Former species ==
- Delphastus sonoricus Casey
- Delphastus subtropicus Casey
- Delphastus violaceus Casey
