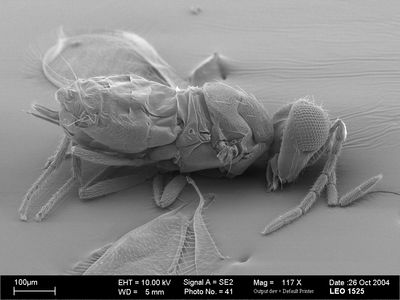

Scientific classification
- Kingdom: Animalia
- Phylum: Arthropoda
- Clade: Pancrustacea
- Class: Insecta
- Order: Hymenoptera
- Family: Aphelinidae
- Subfamily: Coccophaginae
- Genus: Encarsia
- Species: E. formosa

Binomial name
- Encarsia formosa Gahan, 1924

= Encarsia formosa =

Species of wasp

Encarsia formosa is a species of chalcidoid wasp and a well known parasitoid of greenhouse whitefly, one of the first to be used commercially for biological pest control, from the 1920s. Its use fell with commercial pesticides in the 1940s, but rose again from the 1970s.

== Description ==
The tiny females (about 0.6 mm long) are black with a yellow abdomen and opalescent wings. The species reproduces asexually via thelytoky induced by Wolbachia infection. This process occasionally produces males, but these are unable to inseminate the females.

The adults use the clap and fling flight mechanism often seen in sub-mm insects.

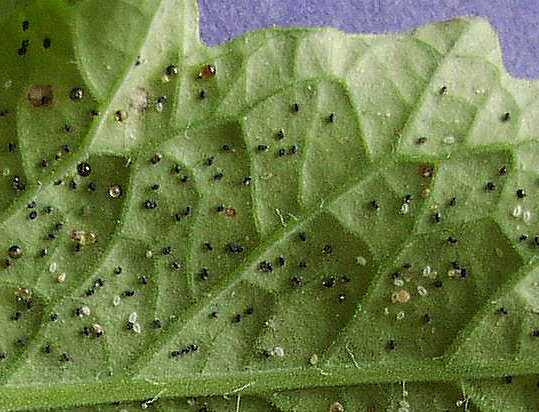
Tomato leaf with whitefly nymphs (white), some of them visibly parasitized by E. formosa (black)

== Life cycle ==
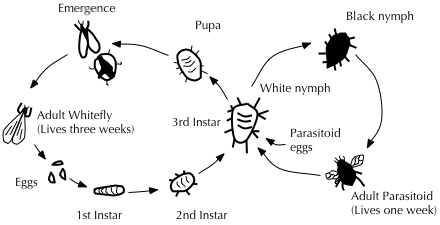
Life cycles of greenhouse whitefly and its parasitoid wasp Encarsia formosa

Females deposit 50-100 eggs individually inside the bodies of nymphs or pupae of the host species. The wasp larvae develop through four instars in about two weeks at optimum temperatures. Parasitised greenhouse whitefly pupae turn black after about 10 days, while parasitised sweet potato whiteflies turn amber-brown — both easily distinguished from unparasitised pupae. Wasp pupation then occurs within the whitefly body, and adult wasps emerge roughly 10 days later. E. formosa can use at least 15 species of whitefly as its host, including Bemisia tabaci and Aleyrodes proletella.

== Use in biological control ==
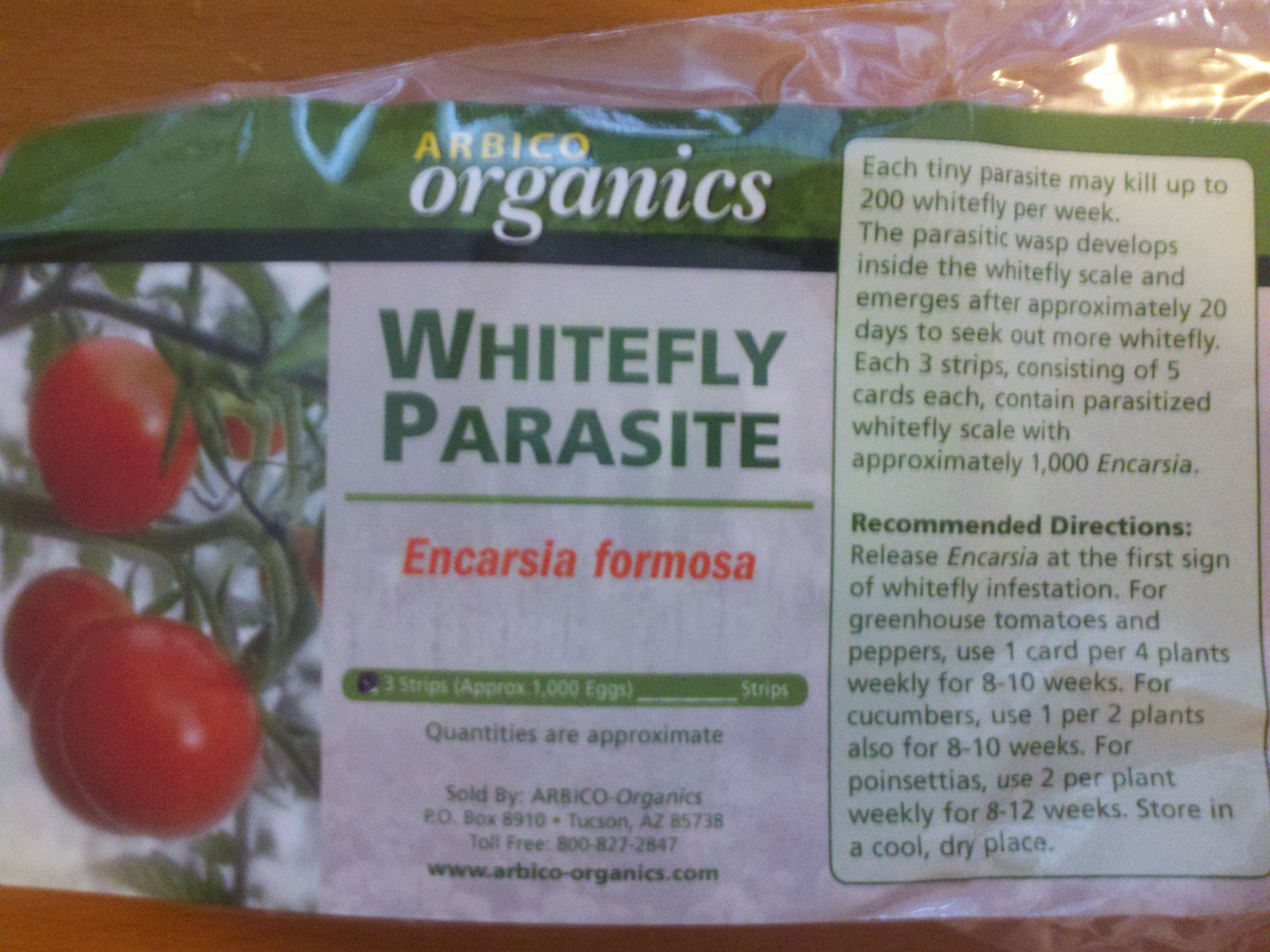
The parasitoid is sold commercially for biological control of whitefly, an insect pest of tomato and other greenhouse crops.

Encarsia formosa has been used as a natural pesticide to control whitefly populations in greenhouses since the 1920s. Use of the insect fell out of fashion due to the increased prevalence of chemical pesticides and was essentially non-existent by the 1940s. Since the 1970s E. formosa has seen something of a revival, with renewed usage in European and Russian greenhouses. In some countries, such as New Zealand, it is the primary biological control agent used to control greenhouse whiteflies, particularly on crops such as tomato which is a difficult plant for predators to establish themselves on.
