= Aphytis (insect) =

Scientific classification
- Kingdom: Animalia
- Phylum: Arthropoda
- Clade: Pancrustacea
- Class: Insecta
- Order: Hymenoptera
- Family: Aphelinidae
- Tribe: Aphytini
- Genus: Aphytis; Howard, 1900

Type species
- Aphytis chilensis Howard, 1900

Species
- See text

Genus of wasps

Aphytis is a genus of chalcid wasps in the family Aphelinidae. There are about 130 species.

== Description ==
Adults of this genus are less than a millimetre in length. They are usually yellowish or grayish in colour, sometimes mottled. In each antenna, the funicle is usually 3-segmented while the clava is 1-segmented. The pronotum is divided. The propodeum is relatively long and bears crenulae. The forewing has a well-defined linea calva.

== Ecology ==
Aphytis are ectoparasitoids of armoured scale insects (Diaspididae). Adult female wasps lay eggs under scale covers onto the bodies of scale insects, which hatch into larvae that feed on the scales until the point of death. Adult wasps also feed on scales directly (host feeding).

== Biological control ==
Various Aphytis species are used for biological control of armoured scales. Of these, the most polyphagous and widespread is A. chrysomphali, which has been reared from over 50 hosts. Other species used in biological control are A. melinus, A. lingnanensis and A. holoxanthus.

Aphytis wasps can be harmed by pollutants in environments where they are used, such as insecticide residues and dust.

== Species ==
- Aphytis aberrans Prinsloo & Neser, 1994
- Aphytis abnormis Howard, 1881
- Aphytis acalcaratus Ren Hui, 1988
- Aphytis acrenulatus DeBach & Rosen, 1976
- Aphytis acutaspidis Rosen & DeBach, 1979
- Aphytis africanus Quednau, 1964
- Aphytis alami Agarwal, 1964
- Aphytis albus Li & Yang, 2004
- Aphytis aligarhensis Hayat, 1998
- Aphytis amazonensis Rosen & DeBach, 1979
- Aphytis angeloni Alec Arsène Girault, 1932
- Aphytis angustus Compere, 1955
- Aphytis anneckei DeBach & Rosen, 1976
- Aphytis anomalus Compere, 1955
- Aphytis antennalis Rosen & DeBach, 1979
- Aphytis aonidiae Mercet, 1911
- Aphytis argenticorpus Rosen & DeBach, 1979
- Aphytis australiensis DeBach & Rosen, 1976
- Aphytis azai Abd-Rabou, 2004
- Aphytis bangalorensis Rosen & DeBach, 1986
- Aphytis bedfordi Rosen & DeBach, 1979
- Aphytis benassyi Fabres, 1978
- Aphytis breviclavatus Huang, 1994
- Aphytis capensis DeBach & Rosen, 1976
- Aphytis capillatus Howard, 1907
- Aphytis caucasicus Chumakova, 1964
- Aphytis cercinus Compere, 1955
- Aphytis chilensis Howard, 1900
- Aphytis chionaspis Ren Hui, 1988
- Aphytis chrysomphali Mercet, 1912
- Aphytis ciliatus Dodd, 1917
- Aphytis cochereaui DeBach & Rosen 1976
- Aphytis coheni DeBach, 1960
- Aphytis columbi Alec Arsène Girault, 1932
- Aphytis comperei DeBach & Rosen, 1976
- Aphytis confusus DeBach & Rosen, 1976
- Aphytis cornuaspis Huang, 1994
- Aphytis costalimai Gomes 1942
- Aphytis cylindratus Compere, 1955
- Aphytis dealbatus Compere, 1955
- Aphytis debachi Azim, 1963
- Aphytis densiciliatus Huang, 1994
- Aphytis desantisi DeBach & Rosen, 1976
- Aphytis diaspidis Howard, 1881
- Aphytis elongatus Huang, 1994
- Aphytis equatorialis Rosen & DeBach, 1979
- Aphytis erythraeus Silvestri, 1915
- Aphytis fabresi DeBach & Rosen, 1976
- Aphytis faurei Annecke, 1964
- Aphytis fioriniae Rosen & Rose, 1989
- Aphytis fisheri DeBach, 1959
- Aphytis funicularis Compere, 1955
- Aphytis gordoni DeBach & Rosen, 1976
- Aphytis griseus Quednau, 1964
- Aphytis haywardi De Santis, 1948
- Aphytis hispanicus Mercet, 1912
- Aphytis holoxanthus DeBach, 1960
- Aphytis huidongensis Huang, 1994
- Aphytis hyalinipennis Rosen & DeBach, 1979
- Aphytis ignotus Compere, 1955
- Aphytis immaculatus Compere, 1955
- Aphytis japonicus DeBach & Azim, 1962
- Aphytis keatsi Alec Arsène Girault, 1919
- Aphytis landii Rosen & DeBach, 1986
- Aphytis lepidosaphes Compere, 1955
- Aphytis liangi Huang, 1994
- Aphytis libanicus Traboulsi, 1969
- Aphytis limonus Rust, 1915
- Aphytis lindingaspis Huang, 1994
- Aphytis lingnanensis Compere, 1955
- Aphytis longicaudus Rosen & DeBach, 1979
- Aphytis luteus Ratzeburg, 1852
- Aphytis maculatipennis Dozier, 1933
- Aphytis maculatipes Alec Arsène Girault, 1917
- Aphytis maculatus Shafee, 1970
- Aphytis maculicornis Masi, 1911
- Aphytis mandalayensis Rosen & DeBach, 1979
- Aphytis manii Hayat, 1998
- Aphytis margaretae DeBach & Rosen, 1976
- Aphytis mashae Myartseva, 2004
- Aphytis matruhi Abd-Rabou, 2004
- Aphytis mazalae DeBach & Rosen, 1976
- Aphytis melanostictus Compere, 1955
- Aphytis melinus DeBach, 1959
- Aphytis merceti Compere, 1955
- Aphytis mimosae DeBach & Rosen, 1976
- Aphytis minutissimus Alec Arsène Girault, 1913
- Aphytis moldavicus Yasnosh, 1966
- Aphytis mytilaspidis Le Baron, 1870
- Aphytis neuter Yasnosh & Myartseva, 1971
- Aphytis newtoni Alec Arsène Girault, 1913
- Aphytis nigripes Compere, 1936
- Aphytis notialis de Santis, 1965
- Aphytis noumeaensis Howard, 1907
- Aphytis obscurus DeBach & Rosen, 1976
- Aphytis opuntiae Mercet, 1912
- Aphytis paramaculicornis DeBach & Rosen, 1976
- Aphytis peculiaris Alec Arsène Girault, 1932
- Aphytis perissoptroides Alec Arsène Girault, 1915
- Aphytis perplexus Rosen & DeBach, 1979
- Aphytis philippinensis DeBach & Rosen, 1976
- Aphytis phoenicis DeBach & Rosen, 1976
- Aphytis pilosus DeBach & Rosen, 1976
- Aphytis pinnaspidis Rosen & DeBach, 1979
- Aphytis proclia Walker, 1839
- Aphytis punctaticorpus Alec Arsène Girault, 1917
- Aphytis quadraspidioti Li, 1996
- Aphytis riyadhi DeBach, 1979
- Aphytis rolaspidis DeBach & Rosen, 1976
- Aphytis roseni DeBach & Gordh, 1974
- Aphytis ruskini Alec Arsène Girault, 1915
- Aphytis salvadorensis Rosen & DeBach, 1979
- Aphytis sankarani Rosen & DeBach, 1986
- Aphytis secundus Compere, 1936
- Aphytis sensorius DeBach & Rosen, 1976
- Aphytis setosus DeBach & Rosen, 1976
- Aphytis simmondsiae DeBach, 1984
- Aphytis simplex Zehntner, 1897
- Aphytis stepanovi Yasnosh, 1995
- Aphytis taylori Quednau, 1964
- Aphytis testaceus Chumakova, 1961
- Aphytis theae Cameron, 1891
- Aphytis transversus Huang, 1994
- Aphytis tucumani Rosen & DeBach, 1979
- Aphytis ulianovi Alec Arsène Girault, 1932
- Aphytis unaspidis Rose & Rosen, 1991
- Aphytis unicus Huang, 1994
- Aphytis vandenboschi DeBach & Rosen, 1976
- Aphytis vastus Prinsloo & Neser, 1994
- Aphytis vittatus Compere, 1925
- Aphytis wallumbillae Alec Arsène Girault, 1924
- Aphytis yanonensis DeBach & Rosen, 1982
- Aphytis yasumatsui Azim, 1963
