= Aphytis melinus =

Scientific classification
- Domain: Eukaryota
- Kingdom: Animalia
- Phylum: Arthropoda
- Class: Insecta
- Order: Hymenoptera
- Family: Aphelinidae
- Genus: Aphytis
- Species: A. melinus

Binomial name
- Aphytis melinus DeBach, 1959

Species of wasp

Aphytis melinus is an internal parasite of the California red scale, Aonidiella aurantii, which is a pest of citrus in California and elsewhere. This wasp drums its antennae against the scale insect to find out if it is healthy, if it is already parasitized, how large it is, etc., to decide how to use this prey. It has four choices (from worst to best): leave the scale to keep searching, feed directly on the scale, use the scale as a host for a male A. melinus, or use the scale for a female A. melinus.

If it accepts the scale as a host, the female will lay an egg in the host. When the egg hatches, the larval wasp consumes the internal organs of the pest. When finished with its host, the larva enters the pupal, or cocoon, stage. From the pupa emerges the adult wasp, smaller than the scale it consumed, which goes off in search of more scale insects.

This beneficial insect has controlled a key pest in citrus, significantly reducing pesticide use on citrus in California.
