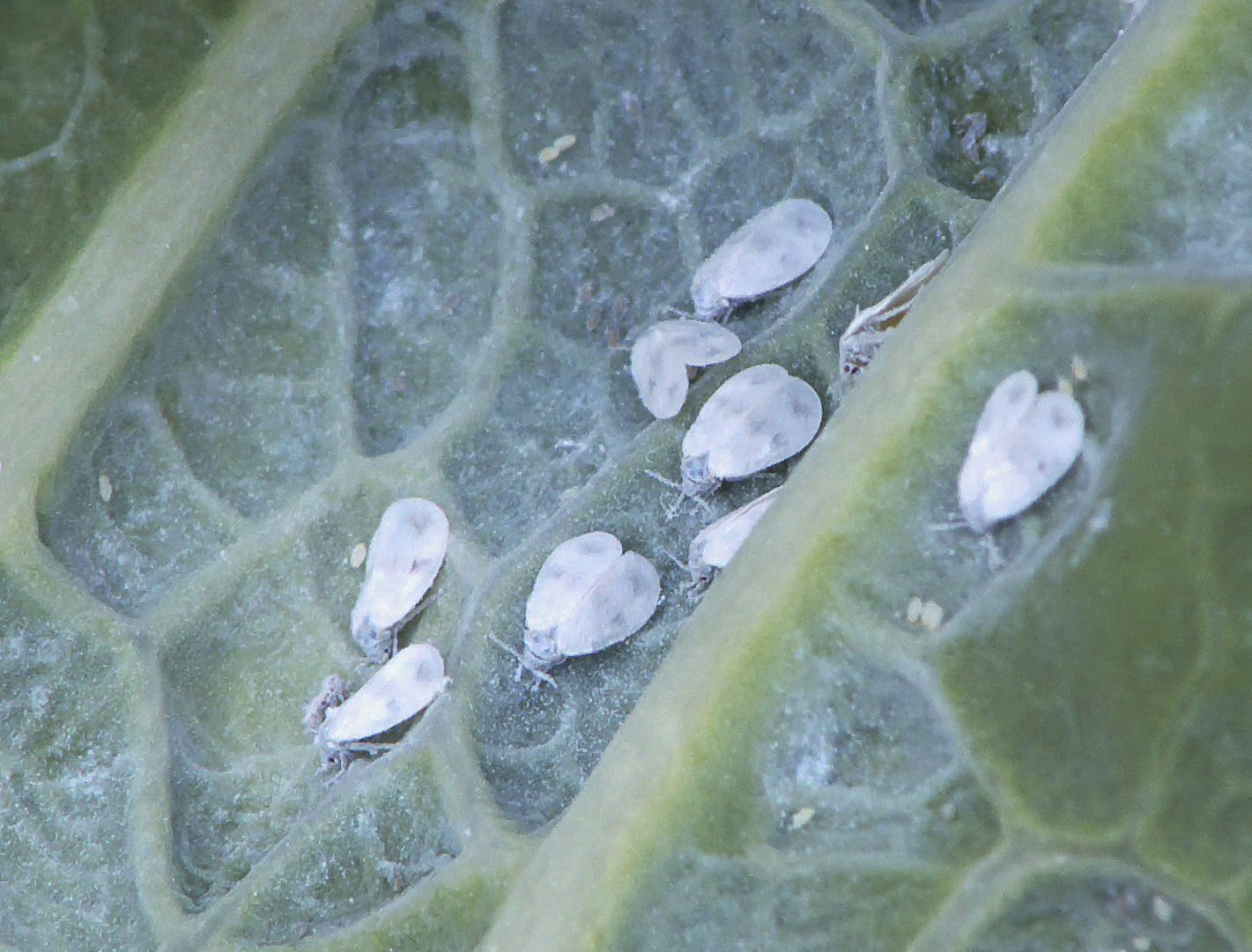
- Aleyrodes proletella with eggs on Kale

Scientific classification
- Kingdom: Animalia
- Phylum: Arthropoda
- Clade: Pancrustacea
- Class: Insecta
- Order: Hemiptera
- Suborder: Sternorrhyncha
- Family: Aleyrodidae
- Genus: Aleyrodes
- Species: A. proletella

Binomial name
- Aleyrodes proletella (Linnaeus, 1758)

Synonyms
- Aleyrodes brassicae Walker

= Aleyrodes proletella =

Species of true bug

Aleyrodes proletella, the cabbage whitefly, is a species of whitefly from the family Aleyrodidae and a major pest of brassica crops. A native of Europe and western Asia, it appeared in North America, Australia, and several other regions around the world by the late 20th and early 21st century.

There are usually four to five generations per year. The development of a generation varies from three to six weeks. A female can lay up to 150 eggs.
